= 2012–13 Glasgow Warriors season =

Glasgow Warriors 2012 / 2013
- Ground: Scotstoun Stadium (Capacity: 10,000 using additional temporary seating)
- Coach: (Scotland) Gregor Townsend
- Captain: (Scotland) Alastair Kellock
- Most caps: (Scotland) Ryan Wilson (27)
- Top scorer: (Scotland) Duncan Weir (82)
- Most tries: (Canada) D. T. H. van der Merwe (Fiji) Nikola Matawalu (10)
- League: Pro12
- 3rd
Team kit

The 2012-13 Glasgow Warriors season saw the team participate in competitions including the RaboDirect Pro12 and the European Rugby Champions Cup.

== Team ==
=== Coaches ===
- (Scotland) Gregor Townsend Head Coach
- (Wales) Gavin Vaughan Head Performance Analyst

=== Squad ===
Hookers (Scotland) Fraser Brown (Scotland) Kevin Bryce (Scotland) Finlay Gillies (Scotland) Dougie Hall (Scotland) Pat MacArthur (Wales) Gerwyn Price Props (Argentina) German Araoz (Scotland) Michael Cusack (Tonga) Ofa Faingaʻanuku (Scotland) Ryan Grant (Scotland) Ed Kalman (Scotland) Moray Low (Scotland) Garry Mountford (Scotland) Luke Pettie (Scotland) Gordon Reid (Scotland) Jon Welsh Locks (Scotland) Nick Campbell (Scotland) Alastair Kellock (Scotland) Tom Ryder (Scotland) Andy Redmayne (Scotland) Tim Swinson	Loose forwards (Scotland) John Barclay (Scotland) Rob Harley (Scotland) James Eddie (Scotland) Chris Fusaro (Tonga) Viliami Maʻafu (New Zealand) Angus Macdonald (Scotland) Josh Strauss (Scotland) Ryan Wilson Scrum halves (Scotland) Chris Cusiter (Scotland) George Graham (Fiji) Nikola Matawalu (Scotland) Henry Pyrgos Fly halves (Scotland) Ruaridh Jackson (Scotland) Finn Russell (Scotland) Duncan Weir (Scotland) Scott Wight	Centres (Scotland) Mark Bennett (Scotland) Alex Dunbar (Scotland) Peter Horne (Scotland) Byron McGuigan (Scotland) Graeme Morrison (Scotland) Peter Murchie (New Zealand) Troy Nathan Back three (Scotland) Stuart Hogg (Scotland) Rory Lamont (Scotland) Sean Lamont (Scotland) Sean Maitland (Canada) Taylor Paris (Scotland) Tommy Seymour (Canada) D. T. H. van der Merwe

==== Academy players ====
- (Scotland) Fergus Scott - Hooker
- (Scotland) George Hunter - Prop
- (Scotland) Jonny Gray - Lock
- (Scotland) Adam Ashe - Flanker
- (Scotland) Callum Templeton - Number Eight
- (Scotland) Murray McConnell - Scrum-half
- (Scotland) Sean Kennedy - Scrum-half
- (Scotland) James Johnstone - Centre
- (Scotland) Bruce Dick - Centre
- (Scotland) Fraser Thomson - Wing

== Player statistics ==
During the 2012–13 season, Glasgow used 51 different players in competitive games. The table below shows the number of appearances and points scored by each player.

Position	Nation	Name	Pro12			Champions Cup			Total	
Position	Nation	Name	Apps (sub)	Tries	Points kicked	Apps (sub)	Tries	Points kicked	Apps (sub)	Total pts
HK	(Scotland)	Fraser Brown	(4)	0	0	0	0	0	(4)	0
HK	(Scotland)	Finlay Gillies	3(5)	0	0	(2)	0	0	3(7)	0
HK	(Scotland)	Dougie Hall	8(9)	0	0	4(2)	0	0	12(11)	0
HK	(Scotland)	Pat MacArthur	11(4)	0	0	2(2)	0	0	13(6)	0
HK	(Wales)	Gerwyn Price	1(1)	0	0	0	0	0	1(1)	0
PR	(Argentina)	German Araoz	(3)	0	0	0	0	0	(3)	0
PR	(Scotland)	Michael Cusack	8(2)	0	0	3	0	0	11(2)	0
PR	(Tonga)	Ofa Faingaʻanuku	2(9)	0	0	(2)	0	0	2(11)	0
PR	(Scotland)	Ryan Grant	11(4)	2	0	4(1)	0	0	15(5)	10
PR	(Scotland)	George Hunter	(2)	0	0	(1)	0	0	(3)	0
PR	(Scotland)	Ed Kalman	2(6)	1	0	0	0	0	2(6)	5
PR	(Scotland)	Moray Low	9(6)	0	0	3(1)	0	0	12(7)	0
PR	(Scotland)	Garry Mountford	(1)	0	0	0	0	0	(1)	0
PR	(Scotland)	Gordon Reid	8(8)	1	0	2(2)	0	0	10(10)	5
PR	(Scotland)	Jon Welsh	6(1)	0	0	0	0	0	6(1)	0
LK	(Scotland)	Nick Campbell	(2)	0	0	(2)	0	0	(4)	0
LK	(Scotland)	Jonny Gray	(2)	0	0	0	0	0	(2)	0
LK	(Scotland)	Alastair Kellock	16	0	0	5	0	0	21	0
LK	(Scotland)	Tom Ryder	15(5)	1	0	3(3)	0	0	18(8)	5
LK	(Scotland)	Tim Swinson	15(4)	4	0	4(2)	0	0	19(6)	20
BR	(Scotland)	Adam Ashe	(1)	0	0	0	0	0	(1)	0
BR	(Scotland)	John Barclay	16(2)	1	0	3(1)	1	0	19(3)	10
BR	(Scotland)	James Eddie	4(14)	1	0	3(1)	0	0	7(15)	5
BR	(Scotland)	Chris Fusaro	6(2)	1	0	1(1)	0	0	7(3)	5
BR	(Scotland)	Rob Harley	11(3)	1	0	2(2)	0	0	13(5)	5
BR	(New Zealand)	Angus Macdonald	1(3)	0	0	0	0	0	1(3)	0
BR	(Scotland)	Josh Strauss	14(3)	1	0	5	2	0	19(3)	15
BR	(Scotland)	Ryan Wilson	17(5)	0	0	4(1)	0	0	21(6)	0
SH	(Scotland)	Chris Cusiter	2(1)	1	0	0	0	0	2(1)	5
SH	(Scotland)	Sean Kennedy	2(3)	0	0	(2)	0	0	2(5)	0
SH	(Fiji)	Nikola Matawalu	11(6)	8	0	2(4)	2	0	13(10)	50
SH	(Scotland)	Henry Pyrgos	10(7)	1	0	4	0	0	14(7)	5
FH	(Scotland)	Ruaridh Jackson	11(4)	2	64	4	0	6	15(4)	80
FH	(Scotland)	Finn Russell	(1)	0	4	0	0	0	(1)	4
FH	(Scotland)	Duncan Weir	7(6)	1	71	1(1)	0	6	8(7)	82
FH	(Scotland)	Scott Wight	3(6)	0	35	1(2)	0	10	4(8)	45
CE	(Scotland)	Mark Bennett	3(2)	3	0	0	0	0	3(2)	15
CE	(Scotland)	Alex Dunbar	16	2	0	3(1)	0	0	19(1)	10
CE	(Scotland)	Peter Horne	14(5)	2	32	5(1)	1	13	19(6)	60
CE	(Scotland)	Graeme Morrison	6(3)	1	0	1(1)	0	0	7(4)	5
CE	(Scotland)	Byron McGuigan	3(3)	2	0	2(1)	0	0	5(4)	10
CE	(New Zealand)	Troy Nathan	1(1)	0	0	0	0	0	1(1)	0
WG	(Scotland)	Rory Lamont	1	0	0	0	0	0	1	0
WG	(Scotland)	Sean Lamont	11(3)	1	0	2	1	0	13(3)	10
WG	(Scotland)	Sean Maitland	6(1)	4	0	3(1)	0	0	9(2)	20
WG	(Canada)	Taylor Paris	1(1)	1	0	0	0	0	1(1)	5
WG	(Scotland)	Tommy Seymour	11	7	0	4	0	0	15	35
WG	(Canada)	D. T. H. van der Merwe	17(1)	10	0	3	0	0	20(1)	50
FB	(Scotland)	Stuart Hogg	8(4)	3	10	4(1)	0	0	12(5)	25
FB	(Scotland)	Peter Murchie	16(1)	4	0	3(1)	0	0	19(2)	20
FB	(Scotland)	Fraser Thomson	1(1)	1	0	0	0	0	1(1)	5

== Staff movements ==
=== Coaches ===
==== Personnel in ====
- Gregor Townsend from Scotland (Asst).
- (Scotland) Gavin Vaughan from (Italy) Aironi Performance Analyst

==== Personnel out ====
(Scotland) Sean Lineen to Scottish Rugby Union (Head of Player Acquisition)

== Player movements ==
=== Player transfers ===
==== Out ====
- (Scotland) Rob McAlpine to (Scotland) Edinburgh Rugby
- Colin Shaw to Scotland 7s

== Competitions ==
=== Pre-season and friendlies ===
==== Match 1 ====
3 August 2012
6pm

Castres Olympique (France)	20 - 17	(Scotland) Glasgow Warriors
	Preview; Report; Report	Try: Taylor Paris; Byron McGuigan; Con: Ruaridh Jackson x 2 Pen: Ruaridh Jackson

Lacaune

Castres:
Glasgow Warriors: 15 Peter Murchie; 14 Tommy Seymour, 13 Byron McGuigan, 12 Troy Nathan, 11 Fraser Thomson; 10 Scott Wight, 9 Murray McConnell; 1 Gordon Reid, 2 Finlay Gillies, 3 Ed Kalman, 4 Nick Campbell, 5 Tim Swinson, 6 Angus Macdonald, 7 Chris Fusaro (CAPTAIN), 8 Adam Ashe
Substitutes: 16 Pat MacArthur, 17 Moray Low, 18 George Hunter, 19 Andrew Redmayne, 20 Ryan Wilson, 21 Henry Pyrgos, 22 Ruaridh Jackson, 23 Alex Dunbar, 24 George Graham, 25 Taylor Paris, 26 Mike Cusack

==== Match 2 ====
18 August 2012
3pm

Sale Sharks (England)	49 - 27	(Scotland) Glasgow Warriors
Try: Richie Vernon; Tom Brady; Tony Buckley; Rob Miller; David Seymour; Corne Uys; Dwayne Peel; Con: Nick Macleod x 3 Rob Miller x 4	Preview; Report; Report; Report	Try: Peter Murchie; Tommy Seymour; Peter Horne; Con: Ruaridh Jackson; Scott Wight x 2 Pen: Ruaridh Jackson x 2

Heywood Road

Sale Sharks: 15 Rob Miller; 14 Charlie Amesbury, 13 Will Addison, 12 Johnny Leota, 11 Tom Brady; 10 Nick MacLeod, 9 Cillian Willis; 1 Eifion Lewis-Roberts, 2 Joe Ward, 3 Tony Buckley, 4 Fraser McKenzie, 5 James Gaskell, 6 Mark Easter, 7 David Seymour (CAPTAIN), 8 Richie Vernon
Replacements: 16 Marc Jones, 17 Vadim Cobilas, Aston Croall, 18 Ross Harrison, 19 Richie Gray, Tom Holmes, 20 James Doyle, 21 Dwayne Peel, 22 Danny Cipriani, 23 Jordan Davies, Corne Uys, Charlie Ingall
Glasgow Warriors: 15 Peter Murchie; 14 Tommy Seymour, 13 Byron McGuigan, 12 Alex Dunbar, 11 Taylor Paris; 10 Ruaridh Jackson, 9 Henry Pyrgos; 1 Gordon Reid, 2 Pat MacArthur, 3 Mike Cusack, 4 Tim Swinson, 5 Nick Campbell, 6 Angus Macdonald, 7 Chris Fusaro (CAPTAIN), 8 Ryan Wilson
Replacements (all used): 16 Finlay Gillies, 17 Moray Low, 18 Ed Kalman, 19 James Eddie, 20 Adam Ashe, 21 Troy Nathan, 22 Scott Wight, 23 Peter Horne, 24 Sean Kennedy, 25 Fraser Thomson, 26 George Hunter

==== Match 3 ====
23 August 2012
7.30pm

Glasgow Warriors (Scotland)	6 - 15	(England) Exeter Chiefs
Pen: Duncan Weir x 2	Preview; Report; Report; Report	Try: Chris Whitehead; James Hanks; Con: Gareth Steenson; Pen: Gareth Steenson

Millbrae
Attendance: 1500
Referee: Andrew McMenemy (SRU)

Glasgow Warriors: Gordon Reid, Finlay Gillies, Moray Low, Tom Ryder, Nick Campbell, Adam Ashe, John Barclay, Ryan Wilson, Henry Pyrgos, Duncan Weir, DTH van der Merwe, Peter Horne, Byron McGuigan, Tommy Seymour, Fraser Thomson
Replacements: (used:) Michael Cusack, George Hunter, James Eddie, Angus Macdonald, Chris Fusaro, Graeme Morrison, Peter Murchie, Scott Wight, Sean Kennedy, (not used:) Ryan Grant
Exeter Chiefs: P Dollman; J Tatupu, I Whitten (L Arscott 57), J Shoemark, M Jess; I Mieres (G Steenson 62), K Barrett (W Chudley h/t); B Sturgess (C Rimmer 65), C Whitehead (S Alcott 74), H Tui; T Hayes (capt, D Welch 71), A Muldowney (J Hanks 62); T Johnson (J Phillips 62), J Scaysbrook, R Baxter (B White 74).

=== European Champions Cup ===
==== Pool 4 ====
Team	P	W	D	L	PF	PA	Diff	TF	TA	TB	LB	Pts
(Ireland) Ulster [5]	6	5	0	1	126	55	+71	12	5	2	1	23
(England) Northampton Saints	6	3	0	3	94	109	−15	9	11	1	2	15
(France) Castres	6	3	0	3	77	98	−21	6	6	0	2	14
(Scotland) Glasgow Warriors	6	1	0	5	70	105	−35	7	12	0	2	6

==== Results ====
===== Round 1 =====
14 October 2012
12:45

(1 BP) Northampton Saints (England)	24–15	(Scotland) Glasgow Warriors
Try: G. Pisi (2) 36' m, 40' c Myler 43' m Artemyev 70' c Con: Myler (1/3); Lamb (1/1)	Report	Try: Strauss 24' c Lamont 28' m Con: Horne (1/1); Pen: Horne (1/1) 18'

Franklin's Gardens, Northampton
Attendance: 12,115
Referee: Romain Poite (France)

===== Round 2 =====
19 October 2012
20:00

Glasgow Warriors (Scotland)	8–19	(Ireland) Ulster
Try: Matawalu 77' m Pen: Horne (1/4) 20'	Report	Try: Henry 60' c Con: Jackson (1/1); Pen: Jackson (4/6) 23', 27', 63', 75'

Scotstoun Stadium, Glasgow
Attendance: 6,194
Referee: Mathieu Raynal (France)

===== Round 3 =====
7 December 2012
19:35

(1 BP) Glasgow Warriors (Scotland)	6–9	(France) Castres Olympique
Pen: Wight (2/3) 12', 22'	Report	Pen: Kockott (3/7) 20', 36', 57'

Scotstoun Stadium, Glasgow
Attendance: 3,348
Referee: Wayne Barnes (England)

===== Round 4 =====
16 December 2012
13:45

Castres Olympique (France)	10–8	(Scotland) Glasgow Warriors (1 BP)
Try: Caballero 73' c Con: Kirkpatrick (1/1); Pen: Teulet (1/3) 5'	Report	Try: Barclay 38' m Pen: Horne (1/2) 1'

Stade Pierre-Antoine, Castres
Attendance: 8,224
Referee: Andrew Small (England)

===== Round 5 =====
11 January 2013
20:00

Ulster (Ireland)	23–6	(Scotland) Glasgow Warriors
Try: Williams 19' c Payne 73' m Cave 78' m Con: Pienaar (1/3); Pen: Pienaar (2/4) 6', 62'	Report	Pen: Weir (2/4) 48', 55'

Ravenhill, Belfast
Attendance: 10,940
Referee: Pascal Gaüzère (France)

===== Round 6 =====
19 January 2013
13:35

Glasgow Warriors (Scotland)	27–20	(England) Northampton Saints (1 BP)
Try: Strauss 46' c Matawalu 66' c Horne 80' c Con: Wight (2/2); Horne (1/1); Pen: Jackson (2/2) 1', 11'	Report	Try: Waldouck 30' c G. Pisi 58' m Foden 71' m Con: Myler (1/1); Pen: Myler (1/1) 13'

Scotstoun Stadium, Glasgow
Attendance: 4,193
Referee: Leighton Hodges (Wales)

=== RaboDirect Pro12 ===
==== League table ====
Pro12 table
	Club	Played	Won	Drawn	Lost	Points For	Points Against	Points Difference	Tries For	Tries Against	Try Bonus	Losing Bonus	Points
1	(Ireland) Ulster (RU)	22	17	1	4	577	348	+229	62	33	8	3	81
2	(Ireland) Leinster (CH)	22	17	0	5	585	386	+199	63	46	9	1	78
3	(Scotland) Glasgow Warriors (SF)	22	16	0	6	541	324	+217	66	30	9	3	76
4	(Wales) Scarlets (SF)	22	15	0	7	436	406	+30	41	37	3	3	66
5	(Wales) Ospreys	22	14	1	7	471	342	+129	48	25	2	2	62
6	(Ireland) Munster	22	11	1	10	442	389	+53	46	34	4	4	54
7	(Italy) Benetton Treviso	22	10	2	10	414	450	–36	45	44	4	2	50
8	(Ireland) Connacht	22	8	1	13	358	422	–64	32	43	1	3	38
9	(Wales) Cardiff Blues	22	8	0	14	348	487	–139	28	51	1	5	38
10	(Scotland) Edinburgh	22	7	0	15	399	504	–105	35	51	1	7	36
11	(Wales) Newport Gwent Dragons	22	6	0	16	358	589	–231	31	72	1	3	28
12	(Italy) Zebre	22	0	0	22	291	573	–282	29	60	1	9	10
If teams are level at any stage, tiebreakers are applied in the following order: 1. number of matches won; 2. the difference between points for and points against; 3. the number of tries scored; 4. the most points scored; 5. the difference between tries for and tries against; 6. the fewest red cards received; 7. the fewest yellow cards received.
Green background (rows 1 to 4) are play-off places. Qualification for the Heineken Cup is based on each country's allocation, i.e. three highest–ranked Irish teams, three highest–ranked Welsh teams, both Italian teams and both Scottish teams. Leinster won the Amlin Challenge Cup, giving Ireland an extra Heineken Cup place that passed to Connacht. Updated 17 May 2013. Source: RaboDirect PRO12

==== Results ====
===== Round 1 =====
31 August 2012
19:05

Ulster (Ireland)	18–10	(Scotland) Glasgow Warriors
Try: Allen 38' m Gilroy 45' c Con: O'Connor (1/2); Pen: O'Connor (2/5) 11', 80'	Report	Try: Seymour 68' c Con: Jackson (1/1); Pen: Weir (1/1) 21'

Ravenhill
Attendance: 8,108
Referee: Marius Mitrea (FIR)

===== Round 2 =====
7 September 2012
19:35

(1 BP) Glasgow Warriors (Scotland)	13–18	(Wales) Scarlets
Try: Cusiter 76' c Con: Weir (1/1); Pen: Jackson (2/4) 6', 39'	Report	Try: Shingler 23' m Fenby 35' m North 57' m Pen: Priestland (1/5) 44'

Scotstoun Stadium
Attendance: 4,348
Referee: Dudley Phillips (IRFU)

===== Round 3 =====
14 September 2012
19:05

Ospreys (Wales)	10–28	(Scotland) Glasgow Warriors
Try: Evans 51' c Con: Biggar (1/1); Pen: Biggar (1/1) 61'	Report	Try: van der Merwe (2) 3' m, 54' c Fusaro 28' c Con: Weir (2/3); Pen: Weir (2/3) 13', 46'; Jackson (1/1) 75'

Liberty Stadium
Attendance: 7,159
Referee: Leo Colgan (IRFU)

===== Round 4 =====
21 September 2012
19:35

(1 BP) Glasgow Warriors (Scotland)	27–17	(Ireland) Connacht
Try: Lamont 18' m Murchie 25' c van der Merwe (2) 46' c, 69' m Con: Wight (2/3); Pen: Wight (1/2) 2'	Report	Try: McCrea 31' c White 49' c Con: Jarvis (2/2); Pen: Jarvis (1/2) 40'

Scotstoun Stadium
Attendance: 3,646
Referee: Alain Rolland (IRFU)

===== Round 5 =====
28 September 2012
19:35

Glasgow Warriors (Scotland)	22–19	(Italy) Zebre (1 BP)
Try: Swinson 21' c van der Merwe 34' m Morrison 40' c Con: Jackson (2/3); Pen: Horne (1/1) 72'	Report	Try: Orquera 12' c Con: Orquera (1/1); Pen: Orquera (3/3) 5', 30', 46'; Garcia (1/2) 10'

Scotstoun Stadium
Attendance: 3,313
Referee: Leighton Hodges (WRU)

===== Round 6 =====
6 October 2012
18:30

Cardiff Blues (Wales)	3–18	(Scotland) Glasgow Warriors
Pen: Halfpenny (1/2) 39'	Report	Pen: Horne (6/7) 17', 25', 28', 34', 46', 58'

Cardiff Arms Park
Attendance: 7,442
Referee: Giuseppe Vivarini (FIR)

===== Round 7 =====
27 October 2012
19:05

Benetton Treviso (Italy)	13–24	(Scotland) Glasgow Warriors
Try: Vosawai 22' c Con: Burton (1/1); Pen: Burton (1/3) 29'; Botes (1/1) 63'	Report	Try: Seymour (2) 65' c, 69' m Con: Wight (1/2); Pen: Jackson (3/4) 12', 16', 43'; Wight (1/1) 57'

Stadio Comunale di Monigo
Attendance: 3,000
Referee: Leo Colgan (IRFU)

===== Round 8 =====
2 November 2012
19:30

(1 BP) Glasgow Warriors (Scotland)	37–6	(Wales) Newport Gwent Dragons
Try: Murchie 14' c Reid 28' c Ryder 43' m Seymour (2) 62' m, 68' c Con: Wight (3/5); Pen: Wight (2/2) 5', 34'	Report	Pen: Prydie (2/3) 31', 37'

Scotstoun Stadium
Attendance: 3,317
Referee: Marius Mitrea (FIR)

===== Round 9 =====
23 November 2012
19:35

(1 BP) Glasgow Warriors (Scotland)	0–6	(Ireland) Leinster
	Report	Pen: Madigan (2/3) 5', 50'

Scotstoun Stadium
Attendance: 3,970
Referee: Neil Hennessy (WRU)

===== Round 10 =====
1 December 2012
19:45

(1 BP) Munster (Ireland)	31–3	(Scotland) Glasgow Warriors
Try: Stander (2) 8' c, 38' c O'Donnell 23' c penalty try 74' c Con: O'Gara (4/4); Pen: O'Gara (1/1) 37'	Report	Pen: Weir (1/1) 3'

Thomond Park
Attendance: 15,138
Referee: Ian Davies (WRU)

===== Round 11: 1872 Cup (1st Leg) =====
21 December 2012
19:35

Glasgow Warriors (Scotland)	23–14	(Scotland) Edinburgh
Try: van der Merwe (2) 7' m, 25' c Harley 14' m Con: Horne (1/3); Pen: Weir (2/3) 67', 72'	Preview; Report; Report; Report	Try: Francis 50' m Pen: Laidlaw (3/3) 32', 45'

Scotstoun Stadium
Attendance: 6,000
Referee: Jérôme Garcès (FFR)

===== Round 12: 1872 Cup (2nd Leg) =====
29 December 2012
16:05

(1 BP) Edinburgh (Scotland)	17–21	(Scotland) Glasgow Warriors
Try: Grant 59' c T. Visser 76' c Con: Laidlaw (2/2); Pen: Laidlaw (1/2) 9'	Report	Try: Maitland 7' m Jackson 29' m Pyrgos 55' m Pen: Horne (2/2) 37', 40'

Murrayfield Stadium
Attendance: 11,225
Referee: Neil Paterson (SRU)

Glasgow Warriors won the 1872 Cup with an aggregate score of 44 - 31.

===== Round 13 =====
4 January 2013
19:30

(1 BP) Glasgow Warriors (Scotland)	41–7	(Italy) Benetton Treviso
Try: van der Merwe 25' c Hogg (2) 28' c, 77' c Seymour 39' c Matawalu 74' c Con: Jackson (3/3); Weir (2/2); Pen: Jackson (2/2) 4', 20'	Report	Try: Minto 52' c Con: Burton (1/1)

Scotstoun Stadium
Attendance: 3,605
Referee: Leo Colgan (IRFU)

===== Round 14 =====
10 February 2013
15:05

Zebre (Italy)	20–36	(Scotland) Glasgow Warriors (1 BP)
Try: van Schalkwyk 4' c Tebaldi 9' c Con: Halangahu (2/2); Pen: Halangahu (2/4) 25', 36'	Report	Try: McGuigan (2) 7' c, 56' m Dunbar 11' c Eddie 61' c Murchie 75' c Con: Wight (2/2); Russell (2/3); Pen: Wight (1/1) 15'

Stadio XXV Aprile
Attendance: 1,000
Referee: Andrew McMenemy (SRU)

===== Round 15 =====
15 February 2013
19:05

Newport Gwent Dragons (Wales)	3–60	(Scotland) Glasgow Warriors (1 BP)
Pen: Prydie (1/2) 2'	Report	Try: Bennett 16' c Matawalu 20' c Dunbar 37' c Paris 60' c Swinson (2) 65' c, 75' m Strauss 68' c Thomson 80' c Con: Weir (5/5); Wight (2/3); Pen: Weir (2/2) 4', 27'

Rodney Parade
Attendance: 4,311
Referee: Claudio Blessano (FIR)

===== Round 16 =====
22 February 2013
19:35

(1 BP) Glasgow Warriors (Scotland)	20–14	(Ireland) Ulster (1 BP)
Try: Swinson 15' m Seymour 28' m Murchie 41' m Matawalu 73' m	Report	Try: Olding 67' m Pen: Pienaar (3/5) 6', 18', 49'

Scotstoun Stadium
Attendance: 5,613
Referee: Nigel Owens (WRU)

===== Round 17 =====
1 March 2013
19:35

(1 BP) Glasgow Warriors (Scotland)	29–13	(Wales) Cardiff Blues
Try: Horne 15' c Matawalu (2) 56' c, 64' m Weir 60' c Con: Weir (3/3); Pen: Weir (1/2) 36'	Report	Try: Navidi 25' c Con: Patchell (1/1); Pen: Patchell (2/2) 34', 39'

Scotstoun Stadium
Attendance: 3,807
Referee: George Clancy (IRFU)

===== Round 18 =====
23 March 2013
19:45

Leinster (Ireland)	22–17	(Scotland) Glasgow Warriors (1 BP)
Try: Madigan 72' c Con: Madigan (1/1); Pen: Madigan (5/5) 13', 24', 36', 40', 77'	Report	Try: Kalman 10' c Horne 32' c Con: Weir (2/2); Pen: Weir (1/1) 19'

Royal Dublin Society
Attendance: 16,156
Referee: Nigel Owens (WRU)

===== Round 19 =====
29 March 2013
20:05

(1 BP) Glasgow Warriors (Scotland)	51–24	(Ireland) Munster
Try: Maitland 1' c Matawalu 28' c Jackson 57' c Bennett 70' c Hogg 74' c Barclay 80' c Con: Jackson (4/4); Weir (2/2); Pen: Jackson (3/3) 34', 38', 65'	Report	Try: Laulala 10' c Kilcoyne 26' c Howlett 77' c Con: O'Gara (2/2); Keatley (1/1); Pen: O'Gara (1/1) 49'

Scotstoun Stadium
Attendance: 5,692
Referee: Leighton Hodges (WRU)

===== Round 20 =====
12 April 2013
19:05

Scarlets (Wales)	29–6	(Scotland) Glasgow Warriors
Try: Owens 18' c L. Williams 46' c Con: O. Williams (2/2); Pen: O. Williams (4/5) 4', 14', 51', 60'; Drop: O. Williams (1/1) 24'	Report	Pen: Jackson (2/2) 21', 27'

Parc y Scarlets
Attendance: 6,901
Referee: George Clancy (IRFU)

===== Round 21 =====
19 April 2013
19:35

(1 BP) Glasgow Warriors (Scotland)	35–17	(Wales) Ospreys
Try: Grant (2) 11' c, 30' c Maitland 17' m Matawalu 56' m van der Merwe 80' m Con: Weir (2/4); Pen: Weir (1/4) 40'; Horne (1/2) 70'	Report	Try: Griffiths 47' c Lewis 61' c Con: Biggar (2/2); Pen: Biggar (1/1) 8'

Scotstoun Stadium
Attendance: 6,642
Referee: Peter Allan (SRU)

===== Round 22 =====
3 May 2013
19:45

Connacht (Ireland)	3–20	(Scotland) Glasgow Warriors
Pen: Parks (1/2) 39'	Report	Try: van der Merwe 16' c Maitland 70' c Con: Jackson (1/1); Hogg (1/1); Pen: Hogg (1/1) 66'; Drop: Jackson (1/1) 12'

Sportsgrounds
Attendance: 6,081
Referee: George Clancy (IRFU)

==== Playoffs ====
===== Semi-finals =====
11 May 2013
19:35

Leinster (Ireland)	17–15	(Scotland) Glasgow Warriors
Try: Heaslip 27' m Pen: J. Sexton (4/6) 12', 32', 63', 70'	Report	Try: Matawalu 15' c Bennett 75' m Con: Hogg (1/2); Pen: Hogg (1/1) 25'

Royal Dublin Society
Attendance: 13,235
Referee: Pascal Gaüzère (FFR)

== End of Season awards ==
Award	Winner
Young Player of the Season	(Scotland) Mark Bennett
Coaches Award	(Scotland) James Eddie
Test Player of the Season	(Scotland) Stuart Hogg
Most Improved Player of the Season	(Scotland) Peter Murchie
Try of the Season	(Scotland) Peter Horne vs. (England) Northampton Saints
Special Award	(Canada) D. T. H. van der Merwe
Player of the Season	(Fiji) Nikola Matawalu

== Competitive debuts this season ==
A player's nationality shown is taken from the nationality at the highest honour for the national side obtained; or if never capped internationally their place of birth. Senior caps take precedence over junior caps or place of birth; junior caps take precedence over place of birth. A player's nationality at debut may be different from the nationality shown. Combination sides like the British and Irish Lions or Pacific Islanders are not national sides, or nationalities.

Players in BOLD font have been capped by their senior international XV side as nationality shown.

Players in Italic font have capped either by their international 7s side; or by the international XV 'A' side as nationality shown.

Players in normal font have not been capped at senior level.

A position in parentheses indicates that the player debuted as a substitute. A player may have made a prior debut for Glasgow Warriors in a non-competitive match, 'A' match or 7s match; these matches are not listed.

Tournaments where competitive debut made:

**Scottish Inter-District Championship**	**Welsh–Scottish League**	**WRU Challenge Cup**	**Celtic League**	**Celtic Cup**	**1872 Cup**	**Pro12**	**Pro14**	**Rainbow Cup**	**United Rugby Championship**	**European Challenge Cup**	**Heineken Cup / European Champions Cup**

Crosshatching indicates a jointly hosted match.

Number	Player nationality	Name	Position	Date of debut	Venue	Stadium	Opposition nationality	Opposition side	Tournament	Match result	Scoring debut
203	(New Zealand)	**Angus Macdonald**	(Flanker)	2012-09-07	Home	Scotstoun Stadium	(Wales)	Scarlets	Pro12	Loss	Nil
204	(The Bahamas)	**George Hunter**	(Prop)	2012-09-14	Away	Liberty Stadium	(Wales)	Ospreys	Pro12	Win	Nil
205	(Scotland)	**Adam Ashe**	(Flanker)	2012-09-14	Away	Liberty Stadium	(Wales)	Ospreys	Pro12	Win	Nil
206	(Scotland)	**Tim Swinson**	Lock	2012-09-21	Home	Scotstoun Stadium	(Ireland)	Connacht	Pro12	Win	Nil
207	(Scotland)	**Josh Strauss**	No. 8	2012-09-28	Home	Scotstoun Stadium	(Italy)	Zebre	Pro12	Win	Nil
208	(Scotland)	Sean Kennedy	Scrum half	2012-09-28	Home	Scotstoun Stadium	(Italy)	Zebre	Pro12	Win	Nil
209	(Scotland)	**Byron McGuigan**	Centre	2012-09-28	Home	Scotstoun Stadium	(Italy)	Zebre	Pro12	Win	Nil
210	(Scotland)	Fraser Thomson	Full back	2012-09-28	Home	Scotstoun Stadium	(Italy)	Zebre	Pro12	Win	Nil
211	(Tonga)	**Ofa Faingaʻanuku**	(Prop)	2012-09-28	Home	Scotstoun Stadium	(Italy)	Zebre	Pro12	Win	Nil
212	(Fiji)	**Nikola Matawalu**	(Scrum half)	2012-10-06	Away	Cardiff Arms Park	(Wales)	Cardiff Blues	Pro12	Win	Nil
213	(Canada)	**Taylor Paris**	Wing	2012-11-02	Home	Scotstoun Stadium	(Wales)	Dragons	Pro12	Win	Nil
214	(Argentina)	**German Araoz**	(Prop)	2012-11-02	Home	Scotstoun Stadium	(Wales)	Dragons	Pro12	Win	Nil
215	(Scotland)	**Sean Maitland**	(Wing)	2012-12-07	Home	Scotstoun Stadium	(France)	Castres Olympique	European Champions Cup	Loss	Nil
216	(Scotland)	**Jonny Gray**	(Lock)	2012-12-21	Home	Scotstoun Stadium	(Scotland)	Edinburgh	1872 Cup	Win	Nil
217	(Wales)	Gerwyn Price	Hooker	2013-02-10	Away	Stadio XXV Aprile	(Italy)	Zebre	Pro12	Win	Nil
218	(Scotland)	**Fraser Brown**	(Hooker)	2013-02-10	Away	Stadio XXV Aprile	(Italy)	Zebre	Pro12	Win	Nil
219	(Scotland)	**Finn Russell**	(Fly half)	2013-02-10	Away	Stadio XXV Aprile	(Italy)	Zebre	Pro12	Win	4 pts
220	(Scotland)	Garry Mountford	(Prop)	2013-02-22	Home	Scotstoun Stadium	(Ireland)	Ulster	Pro12	Win	Nil

== Sponsorship ==
Glasgow Airport - Partner

=== Official kit supplier ===
Canterbury
