= 2014 Pro12 Grand Final =

Rugby union match

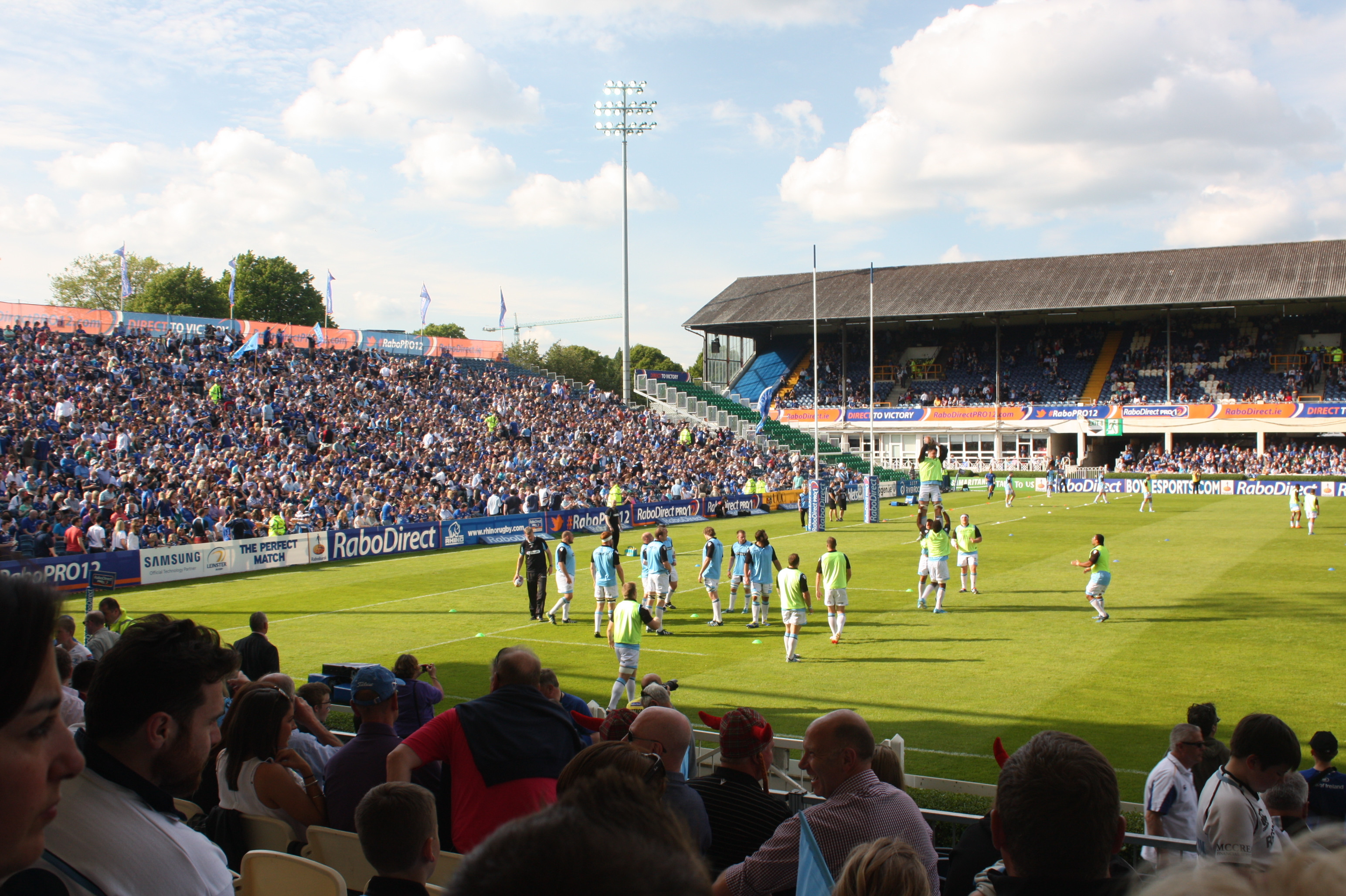
- The Glasgow Warriors warming up in Dublin
- Event: 2013–14 Pro12
| Leinster | Glasgow Warriors |
| (Ireland) | (Scotland) |
| 34 | 12 |
- Date: 31 May 2014
- Venue: RDS Arena, Dublin
- Man of the Match: Seán Cronin
- Referee: Nigel Owens (WRU)
- Attendance: 19,200
- Weather: Sunny

The 2014 Pro12 Grand Final was the final match of the 2013–14 Pro12 season. The 2013–14 season was the third with RaboDirect as title sponsor and the fifth ever League Grand Final. The final was between defending champions Leinster and the Glasgow Warriors. Leinster won the game 34–12.

A hamstring injury forced Brian O'Driscoll off after eight minutes in his 186th and final appearance for Leinster before retiring from rugby.

== Route to the final ==
=== 2014 Playoffs ===
The semi-finals followed a 1 v 4, 2 v 3 system with the games being played at the home ground of the higher placed teams.

16 May 2014
19:35

| Glasgow Warriors (Scotland) | 16–15 | (Ireland) Munster |
| Try: Reid 46' c Con: Russell (1/1); Pen: Russell (3/4) 17', 36', 39' | Report | Try: Varley 9' c Dougall 51' m Con: Keatley (1/2); Pen: Keatley (1/1) 66' |

Scotstoun Stadium
Attendance: 10,000
Referee: Marius Mitrea (FIR)

17 May 2014
19:00

| Leinster (Ireland) | 13–9 | (Ireland) Ulster |
| Try: Madigan 72' c Con: Gopperth (1/1); Pen: Gopperth (2/2) 58', 64' | Report | Pen: Jackson (3/3) 7', 40', 53' |

RDS Arena
Attendance: 18,246
Referee: Leighton Hodges (WRU)

== Build-Up ==
Leinster were favorites to win the game at 4/11 odds with Glasgow at 2/1 at Paddy Power. Glasgow had only won once in 19 games against Leinster. Leinster were appearing in a fifth successive final while this is a first final for Glasgow. Brian O'Driscoll was making his final appearance as a professional rugby player in this game.

The match was shown live on RTÉ Two and TG4 in Ireland, and live on BBC Alba and BBC Scotland in the UK.

== Match ==
=== Details ===
31 May 2014
18:15

| Leinster (Ireland) | 34–12 | (Scotland) Glasgow Warriors |
| Try: Kirchner (2) 17' c, 74' c Jennings 38' c D'Arcy 76' c Con: Gopperth (4/4); Pen: Gopperth (2/3) 60', 65' | Report | Pen: Russell (4/4) 4', 13', 35', 40' |

RDS Arena
Attendance: 19,200
Referee: Nigel Owens (WRU)

| FB | 15 | (Ireland) Rob Kearney | (substituted off) 78' |
| RW | 14 | (Ireland) Fergus McFadden |
| OC | 13 | (Ireland) Brian O'Driscoll | (substituted off) 9' |
| IC | 12 | (Ireland) Gordon D'Arcy |
| LW | 11 | (South Africa) Zane Kirchner |
| FH | 10 | (New Zealand) Jimmy Gopperth |
| SH | 9 | (Ireland) Eoin Reddan | (substituted off) 76' |
| N8 | 8 | (Ireland) Jamie Heaslip (c) |
| OF | 7 | (Ireland) Shane Jennings | (substituted off) 55' |
| BF | 6 | (Ireland) Rhys Ruddock |
| RL | 5 | (Ireland) Mike McCarthy | (substituted off) 60' |
| LL | 4 | (Ireland) Devin Toner |
| TP | 3 | (Ireland) Mike Ross | (substituted off) 50' |
| HK | 2 | (Ireland) Seán Cronin | (substituted off) 78' |
| LP | 1 | (Ireland) Cian Healy | (substituted off) 67' |
Replacements:
| HK | 16 | (Ireland) Aaron Dundon | (substituted on) 78' |
| PR | 17 | (Ireland) Jack McGrath | (substituted on) 67' |
| PR | 18 | (Ireland) Martin Moore | (substituted on) 50' |
| LK | 19 | (Ireland) Leo Cullen | (substituted on) 60' |
| FL | 20 | (Ireland) Seán O'Brien | (substituted on) 55' |
| SH | 21 | (Ireland) Isaac Boss | (substituted on) 76' |
| FH | 22 | (Ireland) Ian Madigan | (substituted on) 9' |
| WG | 23 | (Ireland) Darragh Fanning | (substituted on) 78' |
Coach:
(Australia) Matt O'Connor

| FB | 15 | (Scotland) Peter Murchie |
| RW | 14 | (Scotland) Sean Maitland |
| OC | 13 | (Scotland) Alex Dunbar | (substituted off) 55' |
| IC | 12 | (Scotland) Peter Horne | (substituted off) 39' | (substituted on) 41' |
| LW | 11 | (Scotland) Tommy Seymour |
| FH | 10 | (Scotland) Finn Russell | | | (substituted off) 67' |
| SH | 9 | (Scotland) Chris Cusiter | (substituted off) 44' |
| N8 | 8 | (Scotland) Josh Strauss |
| OF | 7 | (Scotland) Chris Fusaro | (substituted off) 25' |
| BF | 6 | (Scotland) Rob Harley |
| RL | 5 | (Scotland) Alastair Kellock (c) | (substituted off) 50' |
| LL | 4 | (Scotland) Jonny Gray |
| TP | 3 | (Scotland) Jon Welsh | (substituted off) 55' |
| HK | 2 | (Scotland) Dougie Hall | (substituted off) 24' |
| LP | 1 | (Scotland) Gordon Reid | (substituted off) 45' |
Replacements:
| HK | 16 | (Scotland) Pat MacArthur | (substituted on) 24' |
| PR | 17 | (Scotland) Ryan Grant | (substituted on) 45' |
| PR | 18 | (Scotland) Moray Low | (substituted on) 55' |
| LK | 19 | (Scotland) Tim Swinson | (substituted on) 50' |
| FL | 20 | (Fiji) Leone Nakarawa | (substituted on) 25' |
| SH | 21 | (Fiji) Nikola Matawalu | (substituted on) 44' |
| FH | 22 | (Scotland) Ruaridh Jackson | (substituted on) 39' | (substituted off) 41' | (substituted on) 67' |
| WG | 23 | (Scotland) Sean Lamont | (substituted on) 55' |
Coach:
(Scotland) Gregor Townsend

Man of the Match:
(Ireland) Seán Cronin (Leinster)

Touch judges:
Leighton Hodges (WRU)
Ian Davies (WRU)
Television match official:
Derek Bevan (WRU)
