= Garry Mountford =

English rugby union player

- Born: Garry Mountford; 26 November 1983 (age 42) Wakefield, England
- Height: 6 ft 3 in (1.91 m)
- Weight: 120 kg (18 st 13 lb; 265 lb)

Rugby union career
- Position: Tighthead Prop
Amateur team(s)
Years	Team	Apps	(Points)
2000-2016	Stirling County		
Senior career
Years	Team	Apps	(Points)
2012-13	Glasgow Warriors	1	(0)
International career
Years	Team	Apps	(Points)
-	Scotland Club XV	2	

Garry Mountford (born 26 November 1983 in Wakefield, England) is a Scottish rugby union player who plays for Stirling County. He previously played for Glasgow Warriors at the Tighthead Prop position.

== Rugby Union career ==
=== Amateur career ===
He represents Stirling County.

=== Professional career ===
Mountford was called into the Glasgow squad along with Gala's Luke Pettie to help cover the front row in 2012-13 season.

Mountford then played for Glasgow Warriors in the Pro12 match against Ulster rugby.

=== International career ===
He has represented Scotland at Club XV level.
