= Allan Glen's RFC =

Scottish rugby union team

- Full name: Allan Glen's Rugby Football Club
- Union: Scottish Rugby Union
- Location: Bishopbriggs, Scotland
- Ground(s): The Bearyards
- League(s): Scottish National League Division Three
- 2021–22: West Division One, 1st of 10

Allan Glen's RFC is a rugby union side based in Bishopbriggs, East Dunbartonshire, Scotland. There are sections for male and female players and junior rugby. The men's First XV plays in the Scottish National League Division Three [2023/24]

== History ==
Allan Glen's RFC was the rugby club connected with Allan Glen's School. The school closed in 1989 but the rugby club continues, and plays its home games at the Bearyards playing fields in Bishopbriggs, which are owned by the Allan Glen's School Club. The rugby club now runs a 1st and 2nd XV and various youth sides.

== Allan Glen's Sevens ==
The club run the Allan Glen's Sevens. The tournament began in 1975. Sides play for the Sir Andrew McCance Cup.

== Notable former players ==
=== Men ===
==== Glasgow Warriors ====
The following former Allan Glen's players represented Glasgow Warriors.

- (Scotland) Al Kellock
- (Scotland) Nick Campbell

==== Scotland ====
The following former Allan Glen's players represented Scotland.

- (Scotland) Al Kellock

== Honours ==
- Scottish Unofficial Championship
  - Champions: 1938–39
- Glasgow University Sevens
  - Champions: 1963
- Greenock Sevens
  - Champions: 1967
- Bearsden Sevens
  - Champions: 1992
- Kilmarnock Sevens
  - Champions: 1934

West Division 1 2022 Champions

West Reserve Division 2 Champions 2024
