= Bruce Dick =

Scottish rugby union player

- Born: Bruce Dick; 11 July 1990 (age 36) Scotland
- Height: 6 ft 0 in (1.83 m)
- Weight: 89 kg (14 st 0 lb)

Rugby union career
- Position: Fly-half / Centre
Amateur team(s)
Years	Team	Apps	(Points)
- Gala RFC
–	Melrose RFC		
- Correct as of 2 September 2015

Bruce Dick (born 11 July 1990 in Scotland) is a Scottish rugby union player who plays for Melrose RFC. He can play at Fly-half or Centre.

Dick played for Gala before moving to Melrose.

On the back of his performances with Melrose, it was announced on 28 May 2012 that Dick had secured an Elite Development Place with Glasgow Warriors for the upcoming season 2012-13.

As part of his EDP contract with Glasgow Warriors he could still play for Melrose. He helped Melrose beat Doncaster Knights in the British and Irish Cup in October 2012.

He played for Glasgow Warriors as part of their 7s squad in the Melrose Sevens in May 2013. He also played in the Warriors 7s squad that won the Glasgow City Sevens in May 2013. They beat Glasgow Hawks 26-17 in the final.

He was with Glasgow Warriors in the 2012-13 season.

He moved from Glasgow Warriors in 2013 to Edinburgh Rugby for the season 2013-14. Again as an EDP, with Edinburgh he was still allowed to play for Melrose.

Unfortunately for Dick he was out for two years from rugby before returning with Melrose in August 2015. He obtained a degree in Business Management from Heriot-Watt University in Edinburgh and is now the Commercial Manager of Dick Brothers, Timber Harvesting Merchants in Galashiels.
