= Michael Cusack (rugby union) =

Scotland international rugby union player

Mike Cusack
- Born: Michael Cusack; 7 November 1984 (age 42) Doncaster, England
- Height: 1.79 m (5 ft 10 1/2 in)
- Weight: 134 kg (21 st 1 lb)

Rugby union career
- Position: Tighthead Prop
Senior career
| Years | Team | Apps | (Points) |
| 2003–2008 | Yorkshire Carnegie | 29 | (0) |
| 2008–2011 | Doncaster Knights | 22 | (0) |
| 2011–2016 | Glasgow Warriors | 48 | (5) |
| 2016 | Newcastle Falcons | 4 | (0) |
| 2016–2018 | Yorkshire Carnegie | | |
International career
| Years | Team | Apps | (Points) |
- England U19
- England U21
| 2015 | Scotland | 2 | (0) |

Michael Cusack (born 7 November 1984 in Doncaster, England) is a British former international rugby union player who last played for Yorkshire Carnegie. His usual position is at tighthead prop. He has previously played for the Glasgow Warriors, the Newcastle Falcons and the Doncaster Knights.

== Rugby Union career ==
=== Professional career ===
He started his professional career playing for the Leeds Tykes. From Leeds, he signed for the Doncaster Knights at the end of the 2007–08 season.

Cusack moved to Glasgow Warriors in the summer of 2011.

After 48 matches for the Warriors spanning five seasons, Cusack signed for Newcastle Falcons on 1 March 2016 He played 4 matches for the Falcons in the Aviva Premiership, making 2 starts and 2 sub appearances.

On the 10 June 2016 it was announced that Cusack signed with Yorkshire Carnegie on a 2-year deal. He made his final appearance against London Irish in the Championship play off final in May 2017. Cusack missed the 2017-18 season through a neck injury which led to him announcing his retirement from rugby in January 2018.

=== International career ===
He played for England under-19s and under-21s.

After being resident in Scotland for over three-years he became eligible for Scotland internationally. He was called up as part of Scotland's extended training squad for the 2015 Rugby World Cup by head coach Vern Cotter on 2 June 2015

Named on the bench for the Ireland versus Scotland match he replaced Jon Welsh at 46 minutes to earn his first full Scotland cap and thus confirm his Scottish nationality

He then made his first start for Scotland against Italy in Turin on the 22 August 2015.
