= 1998 South Africa rugby union tour of Britain and Ireland =

Summary
P	W	D	L
Total
8	7	0	1
Test match
4	3	0	1
Opponent
P	W	D	L
Wales
1	1	0	0
Ireland
1	1	0	0
Scotland
1	1	0	0
England
1	0	0	1

The 1998 South Africa rugby union tour of Britain and Ireland was a series of rugby matches played by the Springboks in November and December 1998. A potential Grand Slam was lost due to the defeat by England in the final Test match.

== Results ==
Scores and results list South Africa's points tally first.

Opposing Team	For	Against	Date	Venue	Status
Glasgow Caledonians	62	9	10 November 1998	Firhill, Glasgow	Tour match
Wales	28	20	14 November 1998	Wembley, London	Test match
Edinburgh Reivers	49	3	17 November 1998	Easter Road, Edinburgh	Tour match
Scotland	35	10	21 November 1998	Murrayfield, Edinburgh	Test match
Combined Provinces	32	5	24 November 1998	Musgrave Park, Cork	Tour match
Ireland	27	13	28 November 1998	Lansdowne Road, Dublin	Test match
Ireland A	50	19	1 December 1998	Ravenhill, Belfast	Tour match
England	7	13	5 December 1998	Twickenham, London	Test match
