= Nick Campbell =

Scottish rugby union player & boxer

- Born: Nicholas Angus Campbell; 8 December 1989 (age 36) Glasgow, Scotland
- Height: 2.02 m (6 ft 7 1/2 in)
- Weight: 120 kg (18 st 13 lb)
- University: Glasgow Caledonian University

Rugby union career
- Position: Lock
Amateur team(s)
Years	Team	Apps	(Points)
- Allan Glen's
–	Cartha Queens Park		
–	Glasgow Hawks		
Senior career
Years	Team	Apps	(Points)
2010–12	Glasgow Warriors	10	(5)
2013–17	Jersey Reds		
International career
Years	Team	Apps	(Points)
2009	Scotland U20	6	(0)
2011	Scotland Club XV		

Nick Campbell is a Scottish boxer and former Scottish Heavyweight Champion. He is also a former Scotland Club XV international rugby union player. He played rugby union for the Glasgow Warriors and the Jersey Reds.

== Rugby Union career ==
=== Amateur career ===
The position he primarily played is lock.

He played for Allan Glen's and then Cartha Queens Park before moving to Glasgow Hawks in 2008.

He played for Glasgow Hawks for two years before signing for the Warriors in 2010.

=== Professional career ===
He made his Glasgow Warriors debut in 2011. He has the Glasgow Warrior No. 197

He scored his first try for Glasgow Warriors in their historic victory over Leinster at the RDS Arena.

=== International career ===
He represented Scotland U20 in Japan, in the Under 20 World Cup.

He played for Scotland Club XV. He played against the Ireland Club XV side in 2011.

== Boxing career ==
Appropriately given his rugby union career, his boxing nickname is "The Glasgow Warrior". Campbell's grandfather was a professional boxer.

He made his boxing debut as a heavyweight on the undercard of Conor Benn versus Samuel Vargas securing victory in the second round of a scheduled six. After already putting his opponent Petr Frohlich on the canvas, he followed up with sustained pressure leading the referee to stop the fight.

=== Scottish Heavyweight Champion ===
He won the Scottish Heavyweight Championship on 26 February 2022, beating Jay McFarlane in seven rounds; at the Hydro in Glasgow. He had sparred with former New Zealand rugby union international player and now boxer, Sonny Bill Williams in the lead up to the fight.

Before the Campbell - McFarlane bout, the Scottish Heavyweight Championship was last contested between George Stern and Hugh McDonald on 22 June 1951; at the Recreation Ground in Alloa. Stern won that match. In the run-up to the fight Stern's family got in touch with Campbell - and he explained: "They are mad Glasgow Warrior supporters! His daughter got in touch and asked if I'd be up for meeting him after the fight if I win, because they had seen me play for the Warriors at Scotstoun."

== See also ==
- List of Scottish rugby union players
- Rugby union in Scotland
