= Ofa Faingaʻanuku =

Ofa Fainga'anuku
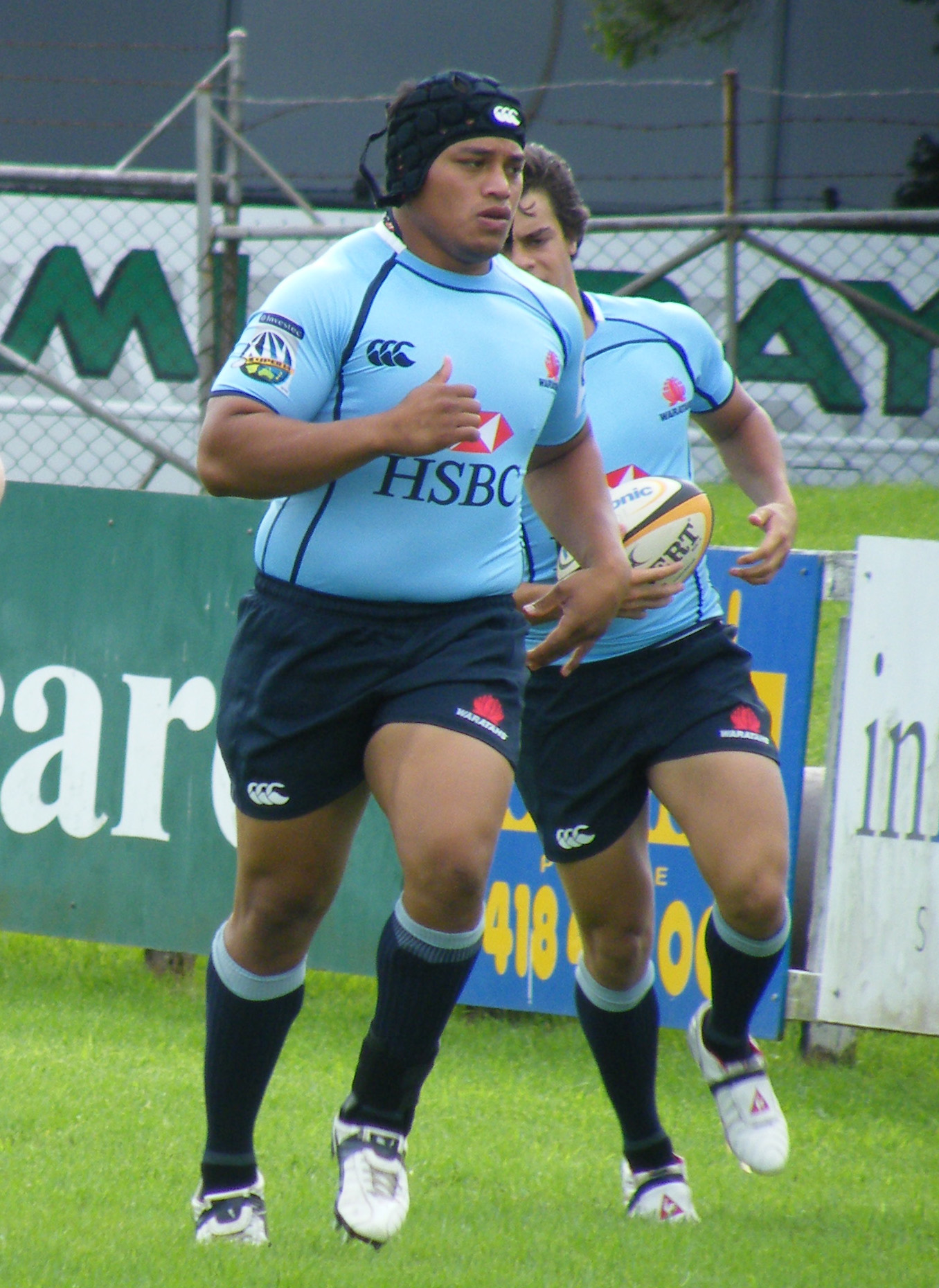
- Born: Ofa H. Fainga'anuku; 5 December 1982 (age 43) Tonga
- Height: 1.83 m (6 ft 0 in)
- Weight: 125 kg (19 st 10 lb)

Rugby union career
- Position: Loosehead Prop
Amateur team(s)
Years	Team	Apps	(Points)
2010-20	Eastern Suburbs		
Senior career
Years	Team	Apps	(Points)
2007	Central Coast Rays	8	(5)
2012–2013	Glasgow Warriors	12	(0)
2013–2015	Worcester Warriors	17	(5)
2015–16	Bayonne		
- Correct as of 30 November 2019
International career
Years	Team	Apps	(Points)
2011	Tonga	3	(0)
- Correct as of 3 December 2012

Ofa Fainga'anuku (born 5 December 1982) is a Tongan rugby union player. He plays as a loosehead prop for Bayonne in the Pro D2.

He has represented Tonga internationally and the Central Coast Rays and Eastern Suburbs in Australian domestic competitions. Ofa has also gone on to coach Eastern Suburbs 2nds Colts reaching a Semi Final in is first year.
