= Ruaridh Jackson =

Scotland international rugby union player

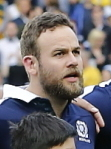
- Jackson in 2017
- Born: Ruaridh James Howard Jackson; 12 February 1988 (age 38) Northampton, England
- Height: 1.83 m (6 ft 0 in)
- Weight: 86 kg (13.5 st; 190 lb)
- School: Robert Gordon's College
- Occupation: Rugby player

Rugby union career
- Position(s): Fly-half, Fullback
Amateur team(s)
Years	Team	Apps	(Points)
2017–18	Currie		
2018-	Glasgow Hawks		
Senior career
Years	Team	Apps	(Points)
2006–2014	Glasgow Warriors	112	(443)
2014–2016	Wasps	19	(78)
2016–2017	Harlequins	18	(77)
2017–20	Glasgow Warriors	50	(47)
- Correct as of 24 March 2018
International career
Years	Team	Apps	(Points)
2010–2019	Scotland	33	(37)
- Correct as of 5 April 2021
National sevens team
Years	Team		Comps
2018–	Scotland 7s		0 (0)
- Correct as of 24 March 2018
Coaching career
- Years: Team
- 2019-: Glasgow Academicals (Asst.)

Ruaridh James Howard Jackson (born 12 February 1988) is a former Scotland international rugby union player. He previously played for Glasgow Warriors in the Pro14. Jackson started his career playing at fly-half, but soon transitioned to playing at full-back, where he usually remained on his return to Glasgow Warriors in 2017.

== Rugby Union career ==
=== Amateur career ===
Jackson was drafted to Currie in the Scottish Premiership for the 2017–18 season.

Jackson has been drafted to Glasgow Hawks in the Scottish Premiership for the 2018–19 season.

=== Professional career ===
Jackson signed for Glasgow Warriors in 2006, making his competitive debut on 27 October 2006; becoming Glasgow Warrior No. 156.

In the 2013–14 season, Jackson was the back-up stand-off for Duncan Weir at both domestic and international levels. In March 2014, it was reported that he would not be offered another contract from Glasgow. From 2014 to 2016, he played for English side Wasps in the Aviva Premiership, though his first season saw little action due to a serious injury.

In May 2016, it was confirmed that Jackson would be joining Premiership rivals Harlequins ahead of the 2016–17 season.

Jackson re-signed for Glasgow Warriors in the summer of 2017, and extended his contract for a further year in 2018. He played mostly at full-back, having mostly played fly- half earlier in his career.

=== International career ===
Jackson made his international debut for Scotland in the autumn of 2010, coming on as a substitute in the test against the All Blacks. He also came off the bench against Samoa two weeks later, kicking the winning penalty goal in the 80th minute in a match played in Aberdeen. Jackson was the starting fly-half for Scotland's 2013 Six Nations campaign, but was dropped from the starting XV halfway through the Championship for Glasgow teammate Duncan Weir. Jackson was selected for Scotland's 2018 tour to Canada, USA and Argentina, and started the first game against Canada. He was called up for the Scotland Sevens squad for the Commonwealth Games in the Gold Coast in 2018.

In March 2019, Jackson returned to the Scotland national squad prior to the Calcutta Cup match of the Six Nations following an injury to fellow Glasgow Warriors full-back Stuart Hogg.

=== Coaching career ===
It was announced on 8 May 2019 that Jackson would be a Backs coach for Glasgow Academicals for the 2019–20 season.

=== Retirement ===
In May 2020 Jackson announced that he would retire from playing professional rugby at the end of the 2019/2020 season.

== Business career ==
Jackson co-owns his own organic gin production company The Garden Shed Drinks Company which he runs with fellow ex-Glasgow Warrior Ryan Grant.

After his rugby union retirement, Jackson became a Brand Development Manager for The Glenturret single malt Scotch whisky.
