= Germán Aráoz =

Argentine rugby union player (born 1985)

- Born: Dario Germán Aráoz; 4 July 1985 (age 41) Tucuman, Argentina
- Height: 6 ft 1 in (1.85 m)
- Weight: 109 kg (17 st 2 lb)

Rugby union career
- Position: Loosehead Prop
Senior career
Years	Team	Apps	(Points)
2012-13	Glasgow Warriors		
–	Viadana		
International career
Years	Team	Apps	(Points)
2012	Argentina	2	(0)

Germán Aráoz (born in Tucuman, Argentina) is an Argentine professional rugby union player. He played for Glasgow Warriors at the Loosehead Prop position.

He has two international caps for Argentina. The first was in Santiago, Chile versus Brazil on 23 May 2012. The second, also in Santiago, was three days later on 26 May 2012 against Chile.

He played for Jockey Club Tucuman in Argentina.

He played for a Pampas XV in the Vodacom Cup in 2011–12.

Aráoz signed a short-term deal with Glasgow Warriors on 16 October 2012. Gregor Townsend signed the player after a spate of injuries to the Warriors' front row.

He played 4 matches for the Warriors, 2 of which were crucially 1872 Cup matches against Edinburgh Rugby. Glasgow won both matches and retained the cup.

On leaving Glasgow, Aráoz signed a deal with Rugby Viadana in Italy.
