= Tim Swinson =

Scotland international rugby union player

- Born: Timothy James Montagu Swinson; 17 February 1987 (age 39) London, England
- Height: 1.93 m (6 ft 4 in)
- Weight: 116 kg (18 st 4 lb; 256 lb)
- School: Oundle School
- University: Newcastle University
- Notable relative: Jo Swinson (cousin)

Rugby union career
- Position(s): Lock, Flanker
- Current team: Saracens
Amateur team(s)
Years	Team	Apps	(Points)
2006-08	Tynedale RFC		
2017-18	Ayr		
2018-	Glasgow Hawks		
Senior career
Years	Team	Apps	(Points)
2007–2012	Newcastle Falcons	120	(65)
2012–2020	Glasgow	137	(75)
2020–2022	Saracens	37	(5)
- Correct as of 18 August 2022
International career
Years	Team	Apps	(Points)
2013–2019	Scotland	38	(5)
- Correct as of 23 June 2018

Tim Swinson (born 17 February 1987 in London, England) is a former Scotland international rugby union player. His preferred position was lock. He recently played for Saracens in Premiership Rugby. He retired from rugby in June 2022.

== Rugby Union career ==
=== Amateur career ===
Swinson was drafted to Ayr in the Scottish Premiership for the 2017-18 season.

=== Professional career ===
Swinson has played for Newcastle Falcons in the English Premiership. He made his Newcastle 1st XV debut against Bath during the 2007–08 season. Swinson ended a disappointing season for the Newcastle Falcons by being named the Falcons Player of the Year. Swinson finished runner up behind Brian McGookin for Falcons player of the year in 2009-10.

Swinson signed a deal with Glasgow Warriors to join them from Newcastle Falcons in the 2012–13 season.

Swinson announced his retirement from the game in May 2020 in order to pursue an apprenticeship in the same garage that his Scotland and Glasgow Warriors team-mate Gordon Reid holds a position in.

Despite having previously announced his retirement, Swinson signed a one-year contract with Saracens ahead of the 2020–21 season. He extended his contract by a further year ahead of Saracens' return to the Premiership the following season.

=== International career ===
He played for Scotland 'A' making his debut in 2013 against England Saxons He won 38 caps for Scotland.
