= Nikola Matawalu =

Fiji international rugby union player

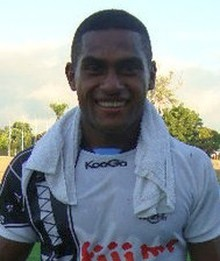
- Matawalu in 2010
- Born: Nikola Matawalu; 8 March 1989 (age 37) Suva, Fiji
- Height: 1.76 m (5 ft 9 1/2 in)
- Weight: 83 kg (13 st 1 lb; 183 lb)
- School: Suva Grammar School

Rugby union career
- Position(s): Scrum-half, Wing
Amateur team(s)
Years	Team	Apps	(Points)
2012-13	Aberdeen GSFP		
2013-14	Ayr		
2014-15	Glasgow Hawks		
2018–19	Stirling County		
2021	2Scots		
2022-24	Pontypridd RFC		
2024-	Caerphilly RFC		
Senior career
Years	Team	Apps	(Points)
2012–15	Glasgow Warriors	74	(130)
2015–16	Bath	13	(5)
2016–17	Exeter Chiefs	0	(0)
2017–21	Glasgow Warriors	47	(90)
2021-22	Montauban		
International career
Years	Team	Apps	(Points)
2010–	Fiji	36	(40)
- Correct as of 7 September 2019
National sevens team
Years	Team		Comps
- Fiji 7s

Nikola Matawalu (born 8 March 1989) is a Fiji international rugby union player. He plays in the scrum-half position but can also cover wing. He previously played for Glasgow Warriors. He had over 100 appearances for the Glasgow club and won the Pro12 title with them in season 2014–15. He also played for US Montauban in the French Rugby Pro D2 and Pontypridd RFC in the Welsh Premier Division.

== Rugby Union career ==
=== Amateur career ===
While at Glasgow Warriors, Matawalu was drafted to various amateur sides within their district to play when not in use by the professional side. In 2012–13 season this was Aberdeen GSFP, in 2013–14 season this was Ayr, in 2014–15 season this was Glasgow Hawks.

Matawalu was drafted to Stirling County in the Scottish Premiership for the 2018–19 season.

He played one game for the 2 Scots in the 2021 Edinburgh City Sevens tournament.

He played for Pontypridd RFC in Wales while studying Rugby Coaching and Analytics at the University of South Wales. He left Pontypridd on 29 March 2024 to embark on a coaching career.

=== Professional career ===
Niko joined Glasgow Warriors for the start of the 2012–13 Pro12 season on a one-year contract. He made his Warriors debut away to Cardiff Blues, coming off the bench to play at scrum-half, becoming Warrior No. 212. He impressed during his first season, scoring 9 tries in 22 appearances, and was awarded with a contract extension to keep him at the Glasgow club until 2015. He was voted Glasgow Warriors player of the season for 2012-13 - and for the 2014–15 season; Glasgow's Pro12 title-winning season. He was also part of the Glasgow Warriors side that won the Melrose Sevens in 2014 and 2015.

In December 2014, it was announced that he would join English Premiership outfit Bath Rugby for the 2015-16 campaign.

In November 2016, it was announced he had signed for Exeter Chiefs. His time in Exeter was disrupted when he was accused of sexually assaulting a woman in December 2016, something he was cleared of in August 2017 - having already been released by the club.

On 31 August 2017 Glasgow Warriors announced that they had re-signed Matawalu on a year's contract with the option of a second year. Kept on, Matawalu would finally leave the club at the end of 2021–21 season, becoming a club centurion along the way. Of his time at the Warriors he said:

When I first joined Glasgow Warriors in 2012 the biggest thing that stood out to me was the culture that the players created. I loved how the club had clans, traditions and customs – all like Fiji. A lot of things have changed over my years here but what makes Glasgow Warriors special hasn’t. Glasgow is my second home and I feel an immense sense of pride to have been part of this wonderful club. Every time I pulled on the Warriors jersey the most important thing for me was to enjoy every moment.

On 31 August 2021 it was announced that he had signed for French Club Montauban.

=== International career ===
In May 2010 he was selected to represent Fiji in their 2010 tour to Australia.
