= Peter Murchie =

Scotland international rugby union player

- Born: Peter Edward Murchie; 7 January 1986 (age 40) Carlisle, England
- Height: 1.91 m (6 ft 3 in)
- Weight: 95 kg (14 st 13 lb)

Rugby union career
- Position: Fullback / Centre
Amateur team(s)
Years	Team	Apps	(Points)
- North Dorset
2006–07	Waterloo		
2007–08	Birmingham & Solihull		
–	Dundee HSFP		
–	Stirling County		
–	Aberdeen GSFP		
Senior career
Years	Team	Apps	(Points)
- Bath
2008–09	London Welsh		
2009–17	Glasgow Warriors	116	(80)
International career
Years	Team	Apps	(Points)
- England U18
2011–12	Scotland A		
2013–2014	Scotland	3	(0)
Coaching career
- Years: Team
- 2017–18: Stade Niçois (asst. coach)
- 2018–19: Ayr (head coach)
- 2019–21: Ayrshire Bulls (head coach)
- 2021-25: Glasgow Warriors (asst. coach)
- 2025-2026: Kobelco Kobe Steelers (defence coach)
- 2026-: Wales (defence coach)

Peter Edward Murchie (born 7 January 1986) is a Scottish professional rugby union coach for Wales and a former Scotland international player. He previously was an assistant coach for Glasgow Warriors, Stade Niçois and Kobelco Kobe Steelers; and head coach for Ayr and then the Ayrshire Bulls. He formerly played for Glasgow Warriors in the Guinness Pro12, making over 100 appearances for the club. His playing position was full-back.

== Rugby union career ==
=== Amateur career ===
He started his career at North Dorset where he came through their mini and youth sides before leaving to join professional side Bath Rugby. He moved to Waterloo then Birmingham & Solihull R.F.C. and then signed for London Welsh RFC just as they turned professional. On moving to Scotland he has played for Dundee HSFP, Stirling County RFC and Aberdeen GSFP RFC as well as professional side Glasgow Warriors.

=== Professional career ===
He first joined Bath Rugby before moving to various lower league English clubs.

Murchie signed for London Welsh in 2008, when the club turned professional.

He signed for Glasgow Warriors in 2009. He made his competitive debut for the club on 4 September 2009, becoming Glasgow Warrior No. 174.

On 21 August 2015 it was announced at a Glasgow Warriors Open Day training session that Murchie would take over the captaincy of the club on a short-term basis while the squad's Scotland players were at the 2015 World Cup.

He played more than 100 times for Glasgow Warriors. On 4 May 2017 it was announced by Glasgow Warriors that Murchie would be leaving the club at the end of the season.

=== International career ===
Murchie's father is from Ayr and used to play rugby for Ardrossan Academicals. Despite having caps for England Under 18 both Murchie and his father were keen on a career in Scotland: ""[My father has] always been keen to get me back north of the border so this move realises an ambition for the two of us".

He represented Scotland A during their unbeaten 2010–11 and 2011–12 campaigns.

On 24 October 2012 he was named in the full Scottish national team for the 2012 end-of-year rugby union tests.

=== Coaching career ===
On 25 July 2017 it was announced that Murchie would be a player/coach at Stade Niçois in France. This was part of a wider tie-up between Scottish Rugby and Stade Nicois.

On 5 January 2018 it was announced that Murchie was retiring on medical advice and took up a coaching position working for Scottish rugby in the academies.

On 21 February 2018 it was announced that Murchie would take over as Ayr RFC head coach, who play in the Scottish Premiership.

On 14 December 2019 Murchie was announced as the head coach for the Ayr Super6 team, after a Scottish Rugby competition restructuring.

Murchie coached Ayr RFC to a league and cup double for the 2018/2019 season after a last minute victory in the cup final played at BT Murrayfield.

On 5 March 2021 it was announced that Peter Murchie would become an assistant coach for Glasgow Warriors, concentrating on Skills coaching. On 10 January 2025 he became a centurion for coaching matches. This made him the first person to play over 100 matches for the club, and also coach 100 matches for the club.

He joined Kobelco Kobe Steelers in 2025, linking up with former Glasgow Warriors head coach Dave Rennie.

On the 22 February 2026 it was announced that Peter Murchie would become the defence coach for Wales ahead of the summer internationals.
