= Ryan Grant (rugby union) =

British Lions & Scotland international rugby union player

- Born: Ryan Grant; 8 October 1985 (age 41) Kirkcaldy, Fife, Scotland
- Height: 1.83 m (6 ft 0 in)
- Weight: 113 kg (17 st 11 lb)
- School: Alice Smith School

Rugby union career
- Position: Loosehead Prop
Amateur team(s)
Years	Team	Apps	(Points)
2005	Army		
2016-17	Currie		
2017-18	Ayr		
Senior career
Years	Team	Apps	(Points)
2005–2007	Border Reivers	6	(0)
2007–2010	Edinburgh Rugby	14	(0)
2010–2017	Glasgow Warriors	109	(40)
2017	Worcester Warriors		
2017	Edinburgh Rugby	0	(0)
2017-2019	Glasgow Warriors	3	(0)
International career
Years	Team	Apps	(Points)
2006	Scotland U21	10	(0)
2007	Scotland A	3	(0)
2012–	Scotland	25	(0)
2013	British & Irish Lions		
- Correct as of 27 September 2015
Coaching career
- Years: Team
- 2019-20: Glasgow Academicals (Asst.)
- 2020-: Glasgow Academicals

Ryan Grant (born 8 October 1985) is a rugby union coach, the co-owner of a gin business and a former Scotland international rugby union player. He became the head coach of Glasgow Academicals in 2020.

Grant was educated at the Alice Smith School in Kuala Lumpur, Malaysia. He was an Area System Operator with the Royal Corps of Signals of the British Army from 2002 to 2005.

== Rugby Union career ==
=== Amateur ===
Grant played rugby for the Army before making the grade at professional level.

In 2016, Grant turned out for Currie in the Scottish Premiership.

In the 2017–18 season, he played with Ayr.

=== Professional ===
Weighing 249 pounds (113 kg) for 6 feet 1 inch (1.85 m) he played prop for the provincial side Glasgow Warriors from 2010, becoming Glasgow Warrior No. 186. He previously played for the Scottish professional sides Border Reivers and Edinburgh Rugby making him one of a few players to have played for three of Scotland's professional teams. He was named in the Pro12 Dream Team at the end of the 2012/13 season.

On 25 January 2017, it was announced that Grant had joined Worcester Warriors with immediate effect.

At the start of the 2017–18 season, Grant was back in Scotland, this time with Edinburgh Rugby again. He trained with Edinburgh and played in their August match against Newcastle Falcons at The Greenyards. Grant was not there long, and joined Edinburgh's 1872 Cup rivals instead. On 28 September 2017, he joined Glasgow Warriors again on a short-term deal.

=== International career ===
Grant made his Scotland debut in the first test of the 2012 summer tour, starting against Australia at the Hunter Stadium in New South Wales. He continued to start in the further two wins over Fiji and Samoa.

On 7 June 2013, Grant was called up for the British & Irish Lions to cover for the injured Gethin Jenkins.

=== Coaching career ===
It was announced on 8 May 2019 that Grant would be a coach for Glasgow Academicals for the 2019–20 season. When the head coach Andy Jackson stood down in 2020, Grant was promoted to head coach of the club.

== Business career ==
Grant co-owns his own organic gin production company, The Garden Shed Drinks Company, which he runs with his fellow ex-Glasgow Warrior, Ruaridh Jackson.
