= Rob Harley =

Scotland international rugby union player

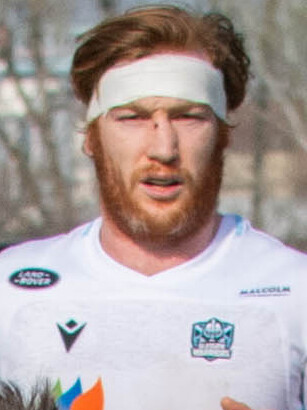
- Harley at Pro14 2020-21
- Born: Robert John Harley; 26 May 1990 (age 36) Crewe, Cheshire, England
- Height: 1.98 m (6 ft 6 in)
- Weight: 112 kg (17 st 9 lb; 247 lb)

Rugby union career
- Position(s): Flanker, Lock
Amateur team(s)
| Years | Team | Apps | (Points) |
- West of Scotland
| 2017–18 | Glasgow Hawks | | |
| 2018-19 | Currie | | |
Senior career
| Years | Team | Apps | (Points) |
| 2010–22 | Glasgow Warriors | 267 | (55) |
| 2022-23 | Carcassonne | 27 | (0) |
| 2023-24 | Colomiers | 11 | (5) |
| 2024- | Old Glory DC | 29 | (0) |
| 2025-26 | Manawatu | 19 | (0) |
- Correct as of 0
International career
| Years | Team | Apps | (Points) |
| 2009–2010 | Scotland U20 | 15 | (5) |
| 2012–2020 | Scotland | 23 | (5) |
- Correct as of 18 November 2021

Robert John Harley (born 26 May 1990) is a Scotland international rugby union player for Old Glory DC in Major League Rugby. He previously played for Glasgow Warriors and is their most capped player. He also played for US Carcassonne. He plays as a flanker but can also cover lock.

== Rugby Union career ==
=== Amateur career ===
Harley was drafted to Glasgow Hawks in the Scottish Premiership for the 2017–18 season.

Harley was drafted to Currie in the Scottish Premiership for the 2018–19 season.

=== Professional career ===
==== Glasgow Warriors ====
He made his Warriors debut on 3 September 2010, winning at home against Leinster. He has the Glasgow Warrior No. 188.

Harley was a back row and lock forward, and also the first player to have played 200 times and 250 times for Glasgow Warriors.

Harley scored the first try of the 2014/15 Pro12 final which Glasgow Warriors went on to win. He gained his 200th cap for the Warriors on Sunday 13 January 2019 against Cardiff Blues in the European Champions Cup which they won 33 -24. He played his 250th game v Edinburgh in May 2021. His final season with the Warriors saw him end his tally on 267 caps, a club record.

==== US Carcassone ====
On 14 June 2022, it was announced that Harley had signed for French side Union Sportive Carcassonnaise in a two-year deal.

==== US Colomiers ====
On 31 July 2023, it was announced that Harley had signed for Colomiers.

==== Old Glory DC ====
On 19 September 2023 Old Glory DC announced that they had signed Harley for MLR 2024.

==== Manawatu Turbos ====
In 2025, Harley played for Manawatu in the New Zealand National Provincial Championship.

=== International career ===
After some good performances for Glasgow in his debut season, he earned a call up to the Scotland senior squad for the 2011 Six Nations Championship. Harley scored a match-winning try on his Scotland debut, against Samoa in June 2012. He was picked throughout the 2015 6 Nations Championship. His most recent cap was against Georgia in 2020.
