= Jon Welsh =

Scotland international rugby union player

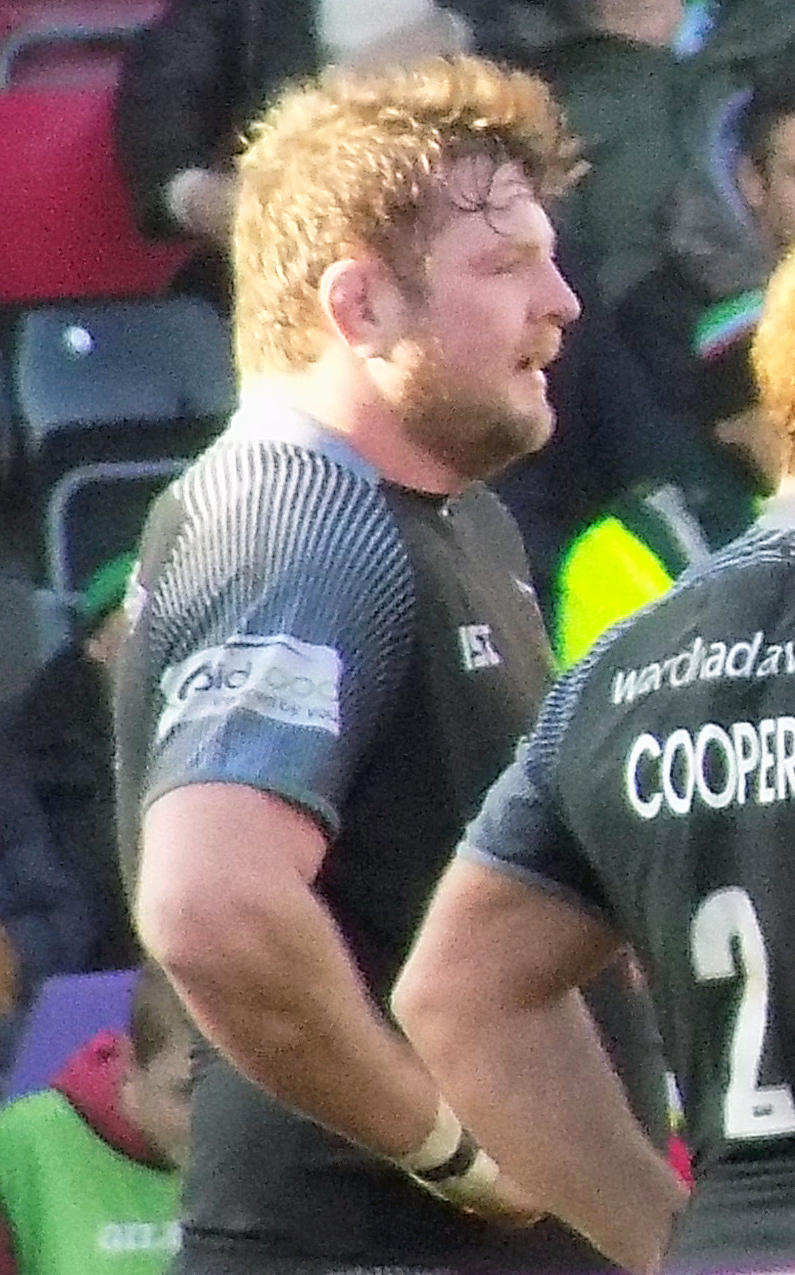
- Welsh playing for Newcastle Falcons, 2018
- Born: Jon Welsh; 13 October 1986 (age 40) Glasgow, Scotland
- Height: 1.88 m (6 ft 2 in)
- Weight: 124 kg (19 st 7 lb)

Rugby union career
- Position: Tighthead Prop
- Current team: Newcastle Falcons
Amateur team(s)
Years	Team	Apps	(Points)
- Whitecraigs RFC
2004–08	GHA		
2008-10	West of Scotland		
2010-11	Glasgow Hawks		
2011-12	Aberdeen GSFP		
2012-13	Ayr		
2013-14	Glasgow Hawks		
2014-15	Ayr		
Senior career
Years	Team	Apps	(Points)
2008–2015	Glasgow Warriors	109	(20)
2015–2019	Newcastle Falcons	56	(10)
2021	Newcastle Falcons	1	
- Correct as of 19 May 2019
International career
Years	Team	Apps	(Points)
- Scotland Club XV
2012–2018	Scotland	12	(5)
- Correct as of 19 May 2019

Jon Welsh (born 13 October 1986) is a Scottish international rugby union player, most recently with Newcastle Falcons. He was previously at Glasgow Warriors. Welsh is a former junior boxing champion, in the end choosing to play rugby professionally.

== Club career ==
Welsh begun playing professionally for Glasgow Warriors around 2008 and was named in the Pro12 Dream Team at the end of the 2011/12 season. One of the high points of Welsh's club rugby career came at Glasgow Warriors. He was a key member of the 2015 Pro12 Grand Final winning squad and played for Glasgow in the playoff final against Irish side Munster. Glasgow had, a year previously, lost the 2014 final against Leinster. Welsh also featured in that final, making it second time lucky in 2015.

Welsh signed for Newcastle Falcons later the same year Although his time at Falcons was frequently disrupted by injury, especially towards the end of his time with the club and after an ACL rupture early in the 2019–20 season as he sought to regain fitness, his contract was terminated in December 2019. After a twelve-month hiatus, in January 2021 Welsh rejoined the Falcons on a short-term deal until the end of the season. Unfortunately, he appeared just once in this period, as another serious injury was sustained against Leicester Tigers when he dislocated his shoulder. At the end of the 2021 season, Welsh was released by the Falcons.

== International career ==
On 1 September 2015, Welsh was named in Vern Cotter's Scotland squad for the 2015 Rugby World Cup. On 18 October 2015, he was involved in a controversial incident in the final minutes of Scotland's quarter-final against Australia. Scotland were defending a 34–32 lead going into the final minutes when a penalty was given by referee Craig Joubert for an apparent offside offence committed by Welsh. The ball had been knocked forward by John Hardie and was also touched by Australian scrum-half Nick Phipps before Welsh picked the ball up. Had Joubert deemed Phipps' touch to be intentional, then the penalty would have been downgraded to an Australian scrum. Bernard Foley kicked the resulting penalty and sent Australia through.
