= Josh Strauss =

Scotland international rugby player

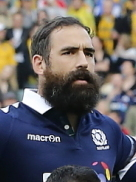
- Strauss in 2017
- Born: Joshua Zac Strauss; 23 October 1986 (age 40) Cape Town, South Africa
- Height: 1.93 m (6 ft 4 in)[2]
- Weight: 116.5 kg (257 lb; 18 st 5 lb)[2]
- School: Paul Roos Gymnasium
- University: Stellenbosch University

Rugby union career
- Position: Flanker/Number 8
Senior career
Years	Team	Apps	(Points)
2007–08	Lons-le-Saunier	13	(10)
2012–17	Glasgow Warriors	104	(50)
2017–19	Sale Sharks	19	(25)
2019–20	Stade Français Paris	6	(0)
2021-	Tel Aviv Heat		
Provincial / State sides
Years	Team	Apps	(Points)
2008–09	Boland Cavaliers	3	(5)
2010–12	Golden Lions	27	(25)
Super Rugby
Years	Team	Apps	(Points)
2011–12	Lions	30	(40)
2020–21	Bulls	6	(0)
International career
Years	Team	Apps	(Points)
2015–	Scotland	15	(0)

Josh Strauss (born 23 October 1986) is a South African-born Scotland international rugby union player who currently plays for Israeli side Tel Aviv Heat. He previously played for Glasgow Warriors and the Bulls. His regular playing position is flanker or number 8.

== Career ==
Strauss played for the Boland Cavaliers and Maties.

He has captained the Lions in Super Rugby and the Golden Lions in the Currie Cup.

On 11 September 2012 Strauss signed for Glasgow Warriors on a three-year deal.

He quickly became a regular in the Warriors' side, captaining them frequently, and was an integral part of their 2014–2015 Pro12 title triumph. He was named in the Pro12 Dream Team at the end of the 2014/15 season.

Strauss - like all professional players in Scotland - was assigned to play for amateur clubs each season when not in use with Glasgow Warriors. After signing for Glasgow in 2012 he was assigned to Dundee HSFP in the Pro-Player draft.

He was assigned to Aberdeen GSFP in the Glasgow Warriors pro-player draft of 2013-14. In 2014-15 he was assigned to Stirling County. In 2016-17 season he was assigned to Currie.

Strauss left Glasgow Warriors in the summer of 2017. On 28 February 2017, Strauss signed a three-year contract with Aviva Premiership club Sale Sharks prior to the 2017-18 season.

He then moved to Stade Français Paris before signing for the Bulls.

He signed for Tel Aviv Heat in 2021.

=== International career ===
Strauss became eligible to play for Scotland in September 2015, and was named in the 31-man squad for the 2015 Rugby World Cup. He made his much-anticipated debut from the bench in the team's opening match victory over Japan.
