= Glasgow Warriors =

Scottish rugby union club, based in Glasgow

- Full name: Glasgow Warriors
- Union: Scottish Rugby Union
- Founded: amateur 1872; 154 years ago professional 1996; 30 years ago
- Location: Glasgow, Scotland
- Ground: Scotstoun Stadium (Capacity: 7,351 using additional temporary seating)
- Chairman: Charles Shaw
- Coach: Franco Smith
- Captain: Kyle Steyn
- Most caps: Rob Harley (267)
- Top scorer: Dan Parks (1530)
- Most tries: George Horne (63)
- League: United Rugby Championship
- 2025–26: League: 1st Playoffs: semi-finals
1st kit	2nd kit

Official website
- glasgowwarriors.org
- Current season

The Glasgow Warriors are a professional rugby union side from Scotland. The team plays in the United Rugby Championship league and in the European Professional Club Rugby tournaments. In the 2014–15 season they won the Pro12 title and became the first Scottish team to win a major trophy in rugby union's professional era. In 2023–24 they became the first Scottish side to win the United Rugby Championship in its current form. The side is known for its fast, dynamic and attacking style of play, using offloads and quick rucks. Defensively the club prides itself on its 'Fortress Scotstoun' where the club play at home. They are noted as 'perennial URC title contenders'.

== History ==
Glasgow Warriors are a continuation of the amateur Glasgow District side founded in 1872.

For the history of Glasgow as an amateur district side see:

Reshaped as a professional club in 1996, Glasgow Warriors were originally known as Glasgow Rugby before rebranding as Glasgow Caledonians in 1998 by a merger with the Caledonian Reds. They dropped the Caledonians to become Glasgow Rugby in 2001 again and finally rebranded as the Glasgow Warriors in 2005.

=== Origins: District Sides ===
Scotland had four District Sides:- North and Midlands; South; Glasgow District and Edinburgh District. Glasgow and Edinburgh were formed in 1872 and played the world's first ever inter-district match on 23 November of that year. This was known as the 'Inter-City' derby; originally a twice a season event until 1876, then became annual thereafter.

The district sides capped the best amateur players from their area's club sides to play inter-district matches and matches against touring sides. The Scottish Inter-District Championship began in 1953–54 (and so encompassed the traditional Inter-City derby). Unlike the Scottish clubs (and Ireland's provincial sides), the Scottish district sides had no settled home and were not members of their Rugby Union. This meant when Scottish rugby embraced professionalism it was not clear if a model based on districts or clubs would be used.

==== Professional model: Club or District debate ====
It was not clear which route professionalism would go in Scotland. This created a turbulent start for professionalism in Scotland and left Scotland far behind fast-embracing Ireland in the set up of its professional structure. The first season of the Heineken Cup in 1995–96 was run without any Scottish teams in European competition.

An EGM was held by the SRU for its member clubs to debate the matter and try and settle the issue on 8 February 1996. The SRU management was in favour of districts and its Vice-president Fred McLeod, and Jim Telfer argued for the proposal. In favour of the clubs to be represented in Europe were former Scotland internationalists Gavin Hastings and Keith Robertson. Critically a speech from the floor from Brian Simmers of Glasgow Academicals – arguing that Hastings and Robertson didn't have the best interests of Scottish rugby at heart and they were arguing only for their own clubs – swung the debate and the District model won by 178 to 24.

The four amateur district teams Glasgow, Edinburgh, South of Scotland and North and Midlands were to become the professional sides Glasgow Warriors, Edinburgh Rugby, Border Reivers and the Caledonia Reds.

=== Professionalisation: Glasgow Warriors ===
Glasgow Rugby was created in 1996 to compete in the Heineken Cup, because the Scottish Rugby Union did not think that Scottish club sides would be able to compete against the best teams from France and England. As the District sides picked the best club players from their respective areas, it was felt that they stood more chance of competing with the other nation's sides.

For a detailed season by season guide of Glasgow Warriors history see:

=== Scottish Inter-District Championship era ===
Glasgow and the other three Scottish districts competed in the Scottish Inter-District Championship to determine their European Qualifying; the leagues positions determining whether they entered the Heineken Cup or the Challenge Cup for the following season.

==== 1996–97 : Kevin Greene in charge ====
Due to Glasgow District's bottom placing in the 1995–96 Scottish Inter-District Championship, Glasgow was entered into the 1996–97 European Challenge Cup where they finished second bottom of their group.

New Zealander Kevin Greene was placed in charge of the professional Glasgow district, however as there was only 8 professional Glasgow planned matches:- 5 in European competition and 3 in the Scottish Inter-District Championship, this was taken on as a part-time role with Greene also coaching the amateur side Glasgow Academicals. This season Glasgow played their home matches at Hughenden Stadium.

Results improved somewhat domestically in 1996–97 with Glasgow securing second place in that season's Inter-District Championship behind Caledonia Reds.

==== 1997–98 : Keith Robertson in charge ====
The season started with Greene still in charge, but it was decided that the Glasgow coach role would be full time; and Greene announced he would shortly be standing down, after discussion with the SRU. This season Glasgow played their home matches at Scotstoun Stadium.

The 1997–98 season saw Glasgow qualified for the Heineken Cup for the first time. In their group stage that season finishing second, they qualified out of the group only to be well beaten in the Quarter Final play-off by Leicester Tigers. That was Kevin Greene's last game in charge and he returned to New Zealand, turning down advances from Ulster Rugby. He remained helpful to the Glasgow District side, organising New Zealand trips for the Glasgow Thistles side, at the time used for Glasgow's up and coming young players.

New Zealander Keith Robertson had been earmarked for the role since May 1997 when the Highlanders toured the UK. In the Scottish Inter-District Championship, Edinburgh, Glasgow and Caledonia Reds all finished the season equal, with the Edinburgh team pipping Glasgow to the title with only a points difference of 3 pts between the two sides.

==== 1998–99 : Merger with Caledonia Reds ====
Because of the SRU's high debt, partly as a result of the redevelopment of Murrayfield Stadium, there was a recognised need for further reorganisation. After two seasons, Glasgow merged with the Caledonia Reds to form a team that would be known as Glasgow Caledonians. As part of the merger, Glasgow played home matches in Glasgow, Stirling, Perth and Aberdeen.

Edinburgh Rugby similarly merged with the Border Reivers. In effect, both the Glasgow and Edinburgh clubs took over the other districts. Glasgow's new 'Caledonian' label was later quietly dropped at the start of the 2001–02 season, with the team name becoming once again Glasgow Rugby. The Glasgow side however became colloquially known as Glasgow Warriors from at least the 2001–02 season onwards.

Only two professional sides remaining meant that the 1998–99 Scottish Inter-District Championship was fought out in a three match 'Tri-Series' battle between Glasgow and Edinburgh.

==== 1999 : Richie Dixon in charge ====
The combined sides did not fare better in Europe. Glasgow finished bottom of their group in the 1998–99 Heineken Cup. Robertson struggled with the newly merged team and the side lost the Tri-Series, and former Glasgow District captain and manager Richie Dixon was brought in to mould the team in January 1999 to finish the season.

The SRU realised that Glasgow and Edinburgh needed more competition domestically than each other and so began a successful dialogue with the Welsh Rugby Union that resulted in both Scottish sides being entered in the WRU Challenge Cup in early 1999.

=== Welsh-Scottish League era ===
==== 1999–2000 : Scottish Inter-District Championship 'Tri-Series' success ====
The WRU Challenge Cup was deemed a success and the SRU and WRU announced a new league system for the 1999–2000 season. The Welsh-Scottish League was essentially the Welsh Premier Division augmented by the Glasgow and Edinburgh sides.

Glasgow played another season with home matches all over Scotland. Glasgow, Stirling, Perth and Aberdeen as before but also Inverness hosted a Tri-Series Inter-District match against Edinburgh.

This meant the end of the traditional Scottish Inter-District Championship although it did continue as before with the amateur district sides. The 1999–2000 season's Tri-Series was run without a sponsor. Glasgow won the title, but at a cost; they had beaten Edinburgh four times that season (including twice in the Tri-Series) and Edinburgh's only win was the 5th match, a dead rubber at the end of the Tri-Series. The fans didn't like the format and it was scrapped.

==== 2000–01 : Coastal Cup success ====
In the pre-season, Dixon took Glasgow off to Canada. There they won 3 matches against Canadian sides to win the Coastal Cup. The side also made progress in the Welsh-Scottish League with a solid 7th place, in front of Edinburgh.

Glasgow made the decision to play their competitive home matches actually in Glasgow, and so played at Hughenden Stadium.

The Welsh-Scottish League lasted three seasons. Although both Glasgow and Edinburgh finished no higher than mid-table for those three seasons, it did provide the Scottish sides with much needed competition. It was looked on as a successful model of co-operation between two rugby unions. The Irish Rugby Football Union began talks with the SRU and WRU about further extending the co-operation in a new Celtic League.

=== Celtic League era ===
==== 2001–02 : Celtic League semi-finalists and the end of the Welsh-Scottish League ====
The Celtic League began in truncated fashion in the autumn of 2001 with the addition of the four Irish provincial teams in two pools; Glasgow reached the semi-finals of the inaugural competition, but struggled thereafter.

In its first year the Celtic League ran concurrently with the 2001–02 Welsh-Scottish League but fixture congestion meant that the Welsh-Scottish tournament was scrapped in favour of the new league.

==== 2002–03 : Kiwi Searancke in charge ====
Dixon became Head of Coach Development for the SRU and once again the SRU looked to New Zealand for a successor. Kiwi Searancke was an outspoken fiery coach, who often criticised the players, and often hit the headlines. He guided the team to the Celtic League quarter-finals but the team struggled in the Scottish Inter-District Championship.

The new Celtic League was an instant success and the SRU took the opportunity to resurrect one of its disbanded districts in 2002. The Border Reivers were thus reborn for 2002–03 season.

The Celtic League remained in its truncated 'pools' form for 2002–03 season before its expansion to a full league set-up the following season. This gave the SRU a one-off chance to revive the 2002–03 Scottish Inter-District Championship as a professional tournament. Glasgow, Edinburgh and the Borders fought in out in what was the final professional Inter-District championship; the Bank of Scotland Pro Cup. Glasgow finished bottom of the table.

==== 2003 : Hugh Campbell in charge ====
Midway through the Scottish Inter-District Championship, on 1 April 2003, the SRU decided Searancke had to go. For a couple of weeks that month, Richie Dixon stepped in, while the SRU looked for a replacement. That replacement was former Glasgow District prop Hugh Campbell. As part of the coaching team Sean Lineen joined as assistant and Shade Munro joined as a development coach.

==== 2003–04 : Glasgow City Sevens success ====
In a poor league season for the Warriors, the club finished second-bottom of the table. It had more success in the short-lived Celtic Cup, reaching the semi-final in its inaugural season. In the European Challenge Cup they were agonisingly dropped out at the second round by Saracens by an aggregate score over the home and away ties going the English club's way by a mere 3 points.

Towards the end of the season Glasgow Warriors entered its academy side into the Glasgow City Sevens, run by Cartha Queens Park rugby club. The young Glasgow side won the event. This was also the first season that the club announced their end of season awards; with Glenn Metcalfe winning their player of the season, and James Eddie winning Young Player of the season.

==== 2004–05 : Best of the Scots ====
In 2004–05 Glasgow had finished sixth in the Celtic League, the best placing of the three Scottish teams that existed at that time. In the league Calvin Howarth and Dan Parks fought it out for the stand off slot, academy prospect Colin Gregor getting a few substitute appearances. Sean Lamont won Player of the Season, scoring 9 tries in competitive matches. The ill-fated Celtic Cup ended this season, Glasgow Warriors beat by Leinster in the Quarter-Finals.

==== 2005–06 : Warriors tag becomes official ====
As noted before, from at least the 2001–02 season, the team was known by the fans as the Glasgow Warriors. The fansite glasgowwarriors.com started in 2003, years before the club officially changed its name. The SRU made this name change official for the start of the new 2005–06 season.

Although the club started the season at Hughenden Stadium around December they made the switch to Firhill Stadium. Firhill Stadium was last used by the Warriors in the 1998–99 season when the side toured Scotland playing their home games.

A drop to 11th place in the league that season sealed Head Coach Hugh Campbell's fate and he left the Warriors before the end of the season in March 2006.

==== 2006–07 : Sean Lineen in charge ====
In his place, the Warriors promoted his assistant Sean Lineen. Under his reign the Warriors became a mid table side. For this season, the club switched back to using Hughenden Stadium for their home matches.

==== 2007–08 : 1872 Cup begins with Glasgow success ====
This season the club again switched base to play back at Firhill Stadium.

Disappointing results for the Border Reivers saw them disband again in 2007. With only two professional sides once again, the SRU took the opportunity to dust down and rename the 1995 Scottish Inter-District Championship trophy and use the two Celtic League fixtures between Glasgow Warriors and Edinburgh Rugby as a mini-cup tournament. The Glasgow-Edinburgh 'inter-city' derby dates back to 1872 and is the oldest provincial match in the world. To mark this, the 1872 Cup thus began in 2007–08.

Glasgow Warriors were the inaugural winners of the 1872 Cup, winning the cup by six points over the two legs of the tie.

==== 2008–09 : Challenge Armand Vaquerin success ====
A pre-season jaunt to France to play Castres Olympique and Béziers saw the Warriors win both matches to win the Challenge Armand Vaquerin, one of the very few non-French teams to win the tournament.

==== 2009–10 : Celtic League semi-final ====
In Lineen's second to last season in 2009–10 the team managed 3rd and secured a semi-final against Ospreys – the club's first Celtic League semi final since 2001–02. Ospreys made the home tie count and ran out 20–15 winners; and went on to win the league that year.

==== 2010–11 : Glasgow City Sevens success ====
The Warriors were looking to push on from that semi-final appearance and become regular play-off contenders for the title. But once again the team slumped to an 11th-place finish in 2010–11. This was the last season of the Celtic League as two Italian sides had joined the league and it was rebranded the next season.

The Warriors did manage to win the Glasgow City Sevens again this season. Joining the usual Scottish sides, the Warriors also competed with Ospreys and Wasps. The Warriors side beat East Renfrewshire sides Whitecraigs and Glasgow Hutchesons Aloysians in the early rounds then Ospreys in the semi-final by 26–17, and then trounced Wasps in the final by 48–0 with Pete Horne grabbing a hat-trick.

=== Pro12 era ===
==== 2011–12 : Pro12 play-offs ====
The Celtic League was rebranded as the Pro12 league in season 2011–12. This was to better reflect the entry of the Italian sides into the Celtic League.

The Pro12 league format had a top four play-off system to decide the champions. The season 2011–12 proved Sean Lineen's last season as Head Coach. Once again, the Warriors finished fourth. That meant an away semi-final in Dublin against Leinster. The Irish side won in a narrow 19 – 15 victory. Lineen moved on to take on the Scotland Under 20 coaching position.

==== 2012–13 : Gregor Townsend in charge ====
Glasgow switched their home base again, back to another old haunt, Scotstoun Stadium.

New coach Gregor Townsend inherited the squad. He solidified Glasgow Warriors position as title challengers in the league. In 2012–13 the team finished 3rd in the league. They were beaten again in Dublin by Leinster in an even narrower score 17 – 15.

==== 2013–14: First Pro12 final and Melrose Sevens success ====
The following season it was no surprise that Leinster and Glasgow were the top two teams in the league. Glasgow's trip to Dublin in 2013–14 ended the same way with an Irish win. Townsend later reflected that he got his team talk wrong in the final, although the then speculation over Stuart Hogg's future couldn't have helped the team either. However the Warriors side, with 7s specialist Carlin Isles starring, did win the Melrose Sevens that year.

==== 2014–15 : Championship and Melrose Sevens success ====
Townsend resolved to go one better the following season. The Warriors finished top of the league and again made the final. Last season that would have ensured a vital home final tie. However this 2014–15 season was the first 'destination' final. So they had to go to Ireland again and face an Irish team. This was Munster and played at Ulster's Kingspan stadium. The Irish were again confident but Glasgow simply blitzed Munster in the final winning 31 – 13 for the Warriors first league title since the 1999–2000 Scottish Inter-District Championship 'Tri-Series'. Glasgow also successfully defended their Melrose Sevens title, beating the German international 7s side in the final.

==== 2015–16 : World Cup decimates squad ====
The following season 2015–16 was a world cup year. With so many Warriors players away with Scotland – and the perennial problem of Scotland only having 2 pro sides – Townsend looked to Europe to make an impact. However Saracens ended their Champions Cup hopes at the quarter final stage. The unfancied Connacht stepped up this year in the Pro12. The Connacht side generally lost the fewest players to the Irish national side and this helped them make a run for the title. They beat Glasgow in Galway in the semi-final, with Finn Russell injured with a serious cheekbone fracture at the start of the match. Connacht then secured the title in a destination final at Murrayfield stadium.

==== 2016–17 : End of an era ====
Townsend's last season was 2016–17. It was announced early that Townsend would be taking over the Scotland international job from Vern Cotter. He had made Glasgow Warriors a fixture in the Pro12 playoffs and made the side champions in 2015. The early announcement this season resulted in a bit of instability and that season Townsend finished in the Warriors lowest position of 6th in his tenure. 2016–17 season was also the last season of the Pro12. 2 South African sides joined the following year and the league was rebranded as the Pro14.

Since the Pro12 started in season 2011–12, Glasgow Warriors were the only team that have made the play-offs in every year, but this record was finally broken at the end of the 2016–17 season on 28 April 2017 when the Warriors lost to Leinster in Dublin ensuring that a top 4 finish for the Glasgow side was unattainable.

Glasgow Warriors hold the Pro12 record of the highest number of consecutive seasons that a team has made the play-offs – with 5 seasons between 2011–12 and 2015–16. Going further back and taking the Celtic League into account, this record is also shared with Leinster who made the play-offs in the last 2 years of the Celtic League and first 3 years of the Pro12.

=== Pro14 era ===
==== 2017–18 : Dave Rennie in charge ====
With the addition of two South African sides, the Pro12 expanded to become the Pro14 for season 2017–18.

The format of the league changed to accommodate the extra teams. It was split into two conferences and matches played in a conference system with the addition of 2 derby fixtures. The play-off system also changed with the winners of the conferences hosting a Semi-Final and each conference runners up and 3rd place teams playing off in Quarter-Final fixtures.

For the Pro14's inaugural season, Glasgow Warriors were placed in a conference with the Ospreys, Blues, Munster, Connacht, Zebre and Cheetahs. After a blistering start with 10 straight wins, the Warriors were the first team to secure a play-off place. The Warriors won top place in Conference A and secured a home semi-final. Inconsistent form in the latter half of the season then cost the Warriors; losing in the semi-final to Scarlets.

==== 2018–19: Pro14 Final in Glasgow ====
Glasgow Warriors' conference did not change for season 2018–19 but home and away fixtures were swapped from the previous year. Other than a blip against the Southern Kings and a notable dip in the Festive period against Edinburgh and Benetton Treviso, by and large Glasgow Warriors seemed to ease through their fixtures. By the end of the regular season Glasgow were top of Conference A again and setting new records:- the final regular season match against Edinburgh Rugby saw the Warriors hit a club record of 7 consecutive try bonus point league wins; their total of 15 try bonus points throughout the season was a new Pro14 record; their 81 points scored was the most ever scored in a league campaign by Glasgow Warriors; and their 83 tries was the most scored in a league campaign by Glasgow Warriors; and their 621 points scored was the most scored in a league campaign by Glasgow Warriors. They narrowly lost to Leinster in the final at Celtic Park following an error by Stuart Hogg in the Warriors try-line. The Celtic Park final attendance, swelled by Glasgow Warriors fans normally unable to watch at a sold-out Scotstoun, remains the highest in the Celtic League/Pro12/Pro14 history.

==== 2019–20 : COVID interrupts ====
In 2019–20, the Warriors started poorly but results picked up as the season progressed. By the end of February 2020, Glasgow Warriors had solidified the play-off 3rd spot and were hopeful of a decent run to overtake Ulster into the 2nd place in their conference. However, the COVID-19 pandemic intervened and Pro14 matches were stopped. The season restarted at the end of August; but it was instead curtailed, now with only two matches to play, meaning it was virtually impossible to catch Ulster in the second spot. Worse for the Warriors was the Pro14 decision to not play any Quarter-Final matches which meant that they would not be involved in the play-offs. Missing out, the final was played between Leinster and Ulster, with Leinster winning.

==== 2020–21 : Danny Wilson in charge ====
Season 2020–21 was still affected with the COVID-19 pandemic; this meant very limited or usually no fans at the matches. The Southern Kings went bankrupt and the Cheetahs were unable to compete due to the pandemic, so the Pro14 ran with 12 European sides, still in two conferences. They did however court some of the South African Super Rugby Unlocked franchises for the following season and organised an end of season tournament – the Rainbow Cup – which because of COVID-19 was run as a mini European league of the Pro14 sides; and a South African league of their 4 biggest franchises that the Pro14 wished to invite – the winners of the two leagues would play off in a final. Glasgow Warriors stuttered in the Pro14 and only improved towards the end of the tournament. They managed to still secure a Champions Cup spot despite their early form. The end of season Rainbow Cup saw Glasgow lose their match against the surprise eventual Rainbow Cup tournament winners Benetton Treviso but then win the rest of their matches, securing the 1872 Cup along the way and beating this season's Pro14 winners Leinster in their last match.

=== United Rugby Championship era ===
==== 2021–22 : Season slump ====
The European sides were again joined by the South African franchises in season 2021–22. The championship was split in four conferences:- a Scottish-Italian conference, a South African conference, a Welsh conference and an Irish conference. The Warriors stuttered through the URC campaign. They seemed to have a bad knack of winning fixtures until the last quarter and then blowing their lead. Still, home results remained a bit better than the away fixtures. By the end of April they were just about managing to cling onto top 4 in the URC. Then the form stopped stuttering, but unfortunately things got worse. They bowed out of the Champions Cup at the hands of La Rochelle (the eventual winners of the European Cup that season), to find themselves in the Challenge Cup. A win against Newcastle Falcons papered over cracks but they were beaten in the quarter-final against Lyon, again losing the match from a winning position. (Lyon went on to win the Challenge Cup.)

Beaten by both European winners may have been understandable but the Glasgow side's league form was much worse and a run of away fixtures hardly helped. Beaten by the Stormers and Bulls, the Warriors lost the 1872 Cup deciding match to Edinburgh. Not only did Edinburgh secure the 1872 Cup, but it meant that Edinburgh leapfrogged Glasgow Warriors in the league and also won the Scottish-Italian conference. Glasgow Warriors finished 8th; their lowest league position since 2010–11. It was the first time that Edinburgh finished higher than Glasgow since that 2010–11 season. Finishing 8th meant that Glasgow failed to qualify for the Champions Cup next season. The last time that happened was the 2005–06 season, causing Hugh Campbell to lose his job; and they played the 2006–07 season in the Challenge Cup under Sean Lineen. Eighth place in 2021–22 did qualify the Warriors for the last quarter-final place of the URC, but they were given the 1st seeds Leinster in Dublin to play. The Warriors failed to regroup for the quarter-final and although they again started brightly the team predictably slumped. It was quite a slump too, a 76–14 defeat: it was the Warriors worst result domestically; and their second-worse result of all time. Only the Leicester Tigers European quarter-final play-off match of 1997–98 season, a 90–19 defeat, was worse. The SRU was quick to act in the face of these poor results and Danny Wilson was stood down as Head Coach.

==== 2022–23 : Franco Smith in charge, European Challenge Cup final ====
Just before the 2022–23 season began, Glasgow hired Franco Smith. It took a few games for the team to settle into the new coach, but they did and results followed. Glasgow went unbeaten at home in the regular URC season, and in European Challenge Cup Glasgow tore through opposition till the final. Winning the 1872 Cup and the Scottish-Italian Shield, they made 4th in the URC, playing Munster at home in the Quarter-Final. A red card to Tom Jordan made it difficult for the Warriors and they lost the match 14–5 to the Irish side. In the European Challenge Cup final, a devastating first half by Toulon scoring 21 points without reply left the Warriors too much to do in the second half and the French side won out 43–19. Nevertheless, it was a very successful first season under Smith, with the side back challenging on all fronts after the slump of the Danny Wilson era. He was named URC coach of the year.

==== 2023–24 : Championship success ====
Scotstoun remained a fortress in the URC and they remained unbeaten at home in the 2023–24 season. Indeed, only the Stormers, the Sharks, Edinburgh and Cardiff managed to prevent Glasgow taking the bonus point win there. Away from home, the Warriors were beaten five times. Once by Connacht, once by Munster, in the 1872 Cup match against Edinburgh – though not enough to stop the 1872 Cup heading to Glasgow again, and crucially at the end of the season an away loss to the Bulls and the Lions. The Warriors lost their 1st place in the league by the two South African losses, and finished the season 4th in the table, but only 3 points behind 1st place.

The play-offs meant that Glasgow faced the Stomers at home. In blustery conditions the Warriors comfortably won the match, helped by the Stomers poor kicking in the wind. The quarter final was against Munster away at Thomond Park. Munster displaying advertising promoting the final between them and the Bulls before the match gave Glasgow extra impetus and they outplayed the Irish side. That meant a final in South Africa at Loftus Versfeld. The Bulls won the match before, but like that match Glasgow knew they could win the second half, if they could keep the first half tight. A score at the end of the first half by Scott Cummings made the half time score 13–7 to the Bulls; and the Warriors stepped on the gas in the second half with tries by George Turner and Huw Jones. Glasgow saw out the match 21 – 16, with the Bulls only scoring 3pts in the second half, to become URC champions.

== Women's team ==
In December 2023, Glasgow launched a women's team to compete in the Celtic Challenge, a cross-border competition that is designed to develop players for the Celtic nations, starting in the 2023–24 season.

== Stadium ==
For the most part, Glasgow Warriors through the years have played their matches in Glasgow either at Hughenden Stadium, Firhill Stadium or Scotstoun Stadium, their current base.

A closer look at the club's history reveals a more nomadic nature. Some of this was planned as the club took over the Caledonia Reds district; or a liberal spreading of the Warriors brand to various grounds for friendlies and smaller ties; and some of this was caused by inclement weather; in particular the Warriors had to play several games at the football ground of Kilmarnock F.C. in 2015/16. The laying of a synthetic pitch at Scotstoun Stadium for the 2016–17 season resolved those weather-related issues, though there have on occasion been complaints from visiting teams about the synthetic surface.

To accommodate their fans and further promote rugby in Glasgow, the Warriors made the decision to play their home 1872 Cup match at Hampden Park in Glasgow in December 2024. That decision was vindicated by almost 28,000 fans turning out at the football stadium, almost four times their Scotstoun capacity.

=== Stadia moves ===
Originally based at Hughenden Stadium in 1996–97, Glasgow moved to Scotstoun Stadium for the 1997–98 season. Rugby at Scotstoun, however, goes back even further, right to the beginning of the 1900s when the likes of Glasgow HSFP and Kelvinside Accies along with others played there on their journeys to Old Anniesland and Balgray respectively.

The merger with the Caledonia Reds for the season caused the Warriors to play their matches not only at Hughenden and Firhill Stadium in Glasgow, but also at Perth's McDiarmid Park and Aberdeen's Rubislaw Playing Fields as it consolidated the traditional North and Midlands district.

The following year saw the Warriors additionally play at Bridgehaugh Park in Stirling. the Caledonian Stadium in Inverness and Millbrae in Ayr.

From the 2000–01 season Glasgow settled in Hughenden through to the middle of 2005–06 season, after which Firhill was used briefly. However the following year Hughenden was used again.

The Warriors moved to Firhill Stadium in 2007–08 season and that was the club's base until the summer of 2012.

In 2012, Glasgow Warriors moved from Firhill back to Scotstoun Stadium, which had previously been the club's training base.

In addition to those grounds above:- Rugby Park in Kilmarnock; Old Anniesland in Glasgow; Braidholm in Giffnock; Whitecraigs in Newton Mearns; London Road in Stranraer; Burnbrae in Milngavie, North Inch in Perth and Murrayfield Stadium in Edinburgh have all hosted home matches for the Glasgow side.

From 2024 Glasgow has taken its home 1872 Cup match against Edinburgh Rugby to the much higher capacity Hampden Stadium to cater for the fan numbers wanting to see the clash.

== Fans ==
Glasgow Warriors fans are collectively known as the Warrior Nation. The official supporters club is The XVIth Warrior, founded in 2012.

=== Home ===
Although the current Scotstoun Stadium capacity has occasionally been increased to 10,000 for selected matches, from the 2016–17 season the standard capacity at home is now 7351, which regularly sells out. There is now a record number of season ticket holders at the club.

Such is the demand for tickets at Glasgow, it had been reported that Mark Dodson, former chief executive of the Scottish Rugby Union, was in talks with Glasgow City Council about building a bigger stand on the railway side of Scotstoun Stadium.

A quirk of such high demand is seen when you compare the 2015–16 standard capacity at Scotstoun (6800) with Glasgow's seasonal average attendance (6950) The seasonal higher than capacity average was made possible when Scotstoun Stadium became unplayable that winter and home games were switched to the higher capacity grounds of Rugby Park and Murrayfield Stadium.

=== Away ===
The away support of the Glasgow Warriors ranges from about 300 fans for a Pro12 match in Italy to around several thousand fans for the 1872 Cup away match against Edinburgh Rugby at Murrayfield Stadium.

The Pro12 Grand Finals of 2013–14 season and 2014–15 season, in Dublin and Belfast respectively, saw around 4 to 5 thousand of the Warrior Nation follow their team to Ireland each time.

The 2016–17 European Champions Cup Quarter Final away to Saracens saw 6000 of the Warrior Nation make their way to Allianz Park and provided the London side with their highest ever home attendance.

=== Fanzones ===
Various public houses around Glasgow have operated as Fanzones for the club. The Grosvenor Cafe in Ashton Lane was announced for the 2015–16 season.

The official Fanzone for the 2016–17 season was The Crafty Pig. This public house in Glasgow's West End is now called The Horn.

For 2018–19 season The Old Schoolhouse in the Woodlands area was the XVIth Warriors fanzone; and this also became the club's official fanzone. For the 2024–25 season, it remained The Old Schoolhouse and additionally The Beechwood Bar in Kings Park was added.

The Platform Bar at the Arches in the city centre hosted a final watchalong for the 2024 Warriors versus Bulls final in South Africa.

The Tiltin Kiltin in the Partick section of Dumbarton Road promotes itself as 'Your Home for Rugby in the Heart of Partick'.

The Raven in Glasgow's city centre at Renfield Street was named as the Official Away Hub for Glasgow Warriors for the 2026–27 season. The XVIth Warrior supporter's group have also made the switch from The Old Schoolhouse to The Raven.

The closest pubs to Scotstoun Stadium are found on Dumbarton Road, around half a mile away. The Scotstoun and Whiteinch area was traditionally a 'dry area' with a history of temperance promoting councillors. The closest, to the south-west of the stadium, is McNabbs; and to the south-east of the stadium, the next closest is The Victoria Park Bowling Club - this is a members club but welcomes fans - and just a bit further along the road there is Granny Gibbs.

== Records and achievements ==
For Amateur era see:

=== Honours ===
- United Rugby Championship
  - Winners: 2 (2014–15), (2023–24)
  - Runners-up: 2 (2013–14, 2018–19)
- United Rugby Championship Scottish/Italian Shield
  - Winners: 4 (2022–23), (2023–24), (2024–25), (2025–26)
  - Runners Up: 1 (2021–22)
- Scottish Inter-District Championship
  - Winners: 1 (1999–2000 Tri-Series)
- 1872 Cup (founded 2007–08)
  - Winners: 12 (2007–08, 2009–10, 2010–11, 2011–12, 2012–13, 2013–14, 2016–17, 2020–21, 2022–23, 2023–24, 2024–25, 2025-26)
- Melrose Sevens
  - Winners: 2 (2013–14, 2014–15)
- Glasgow City Sevens
  - Winners: 3 (2003–04, 2010–11, 2012–13)

=== Season standings ===
Competing as Glasgow Warriors unless stated.
Competing as ᵜ Glasgow Rugby.
Competing as ^{β} Glasgow Caledonian Reds.

==== League competitions ====
Scottish Inter-District Championship	Welsh-Scottish League	Celtic League	Pro12	Pro14	Rainbow Cup	United Rugby Championship

Season	Pos	Pld	W	D	L	F	A	+/-	BP	Pts	Notes
1996–97 ᵜ	2nd	3	2	0	1	63	51	+12	–	4	
1997–98 ᵜ	2nd	3	2	0	1	66	29	+37	–	4	(second on tries scored)
1998–99 ^{β}	2nd	3	1	0	2	32	97	−65	–	2	(Edinburgh won Tri-series 2–1)
1999–2000 ^{β}	1st & CH	3	2	0	1	104	56	+48	–	4	(Glasgow won Tri-series 2–1)
1999–2000 ^{β}	10th	22	8	1	13	488	621	−133	–	25	
2000–01 ^{β}	7th	22	12	0	10	645	608	+37	–	36	
2001–02 ᵜ	8th	20	8	1	11	475	527	−52	–	25	
2001–02 ᵜ	3rd in Pool A	7	4	1	2	204	172	+32	–	13	(lost semi-final to Leinster)
2002–03 ᵜ	3rd	8	2	1	5	144	210	−66	1	11	Bank of Scotland Pro Cup
2002–03 ᵜ	2nd in Pool B	7	5	0	2	216	166	+50	3	23	(lost quarter-final to Ulster)
2003–04 ᵜ	11th	22	6	1	15	442	614	−172	6	32	
2004–05 ᵜ	6th	20	8	1	11	465	466	−1	11	45	
2005–06	11th	22	5	0	15	371	439	−68	9	37	(All deemed + 2 games: 8 pts)
2006–07	7th	20	11	0	9	434	419	+15	5	49	
2007–08	5th	18	10	1	7	340	349	−9	4	46	
2008–09	7th	18	7	0	11	349	375	−26	9	37	
2009–10	3rd	18	11	2	5	390	321	+69	3	51	(lost semi-final to Ospreys)
2010–11	11th	22	6	1	15	401	543	−142	7	33	
2011–12	4th	22	13	4	5	445	321	+124	5	65	(lost semi-final to Leinster)
2012–13	3rd	22	16	0	6	541	324	+217	12	76	(lost semi-final to Leinster)
2013–14	2nd & RU	22	18	0	4	484	309	+175	7	79	(lost final to Leinster)
2014–15	1st & CH	22	16	1	5	540	360	+180	9	75	(defeated Munster in final)
2015–16	3rd	22	13	1	7	557	380	+177	14	72	(lost semi-final to Connacht)
2016–17	6th	22	11	0	11	540	464	+76	14	58	
2017–18	1st in Conf A	21	15	1	5	614	366	+248	14	76	(lost semi-final to Scarlets)
2018–19	1st Cf A & RU	21	16	0	5	621	380	+241	17	81	(lost final to Leinster)
2019–20	3rd in Conf A	15	8	0	7	364	329	+35	6	38	(no quarter-final place as tournament curtailed)
2020–21	4th in Conf A	16	6	0	10	335	377	-42	6	30	
2020–21	3rd in Europ. League	5	4	0	1	121	117	+4	3	19	
2021–22	8th	18	10	0	8	409	376	+33	10	50	(lost quarter-final to Leinster)
2022–23	4th	18	13	0	5	498	403	+95	11	63	(lost quarter-final to Munster)
2023–24	4th & CH	18	13	0	5	519	353	+166	13	65	(defeated Bulls in final)
2024–25	4th	18	11	0	7	468	327	+141	15	59	(lost semi-final to Leinster)
2025–26	1st	18	13	0	5	479	338	+141	13	65	(lost semi-final to Bulls)

==== European competitions ====
European Challenge Cup	Heineken Cup / European Champions Cup

Season	Pos	Pld	W	D	L	F	A	+/-	BP	Pts	Notes
1996–97 ᵜ	5th in Pool A	5	1	0	4	113	202	-89	-	2	
1997–98 ᵜ	2nd in Pool 2	6	3	0	3	132	167	-35	-	6	(lost Qtr-Final play-off to Leicester Tigers)
1998–99 ^{β}	4th in Pool 4	6	2	0	4	121	187	-66	-	4	
1999–00 ^{β}	3rd in Pool 1	6	2	0	4	130	179	-49	-	4	
2000–01 ^{β}	4th in Pool 6	6	1	0	5	137	227	-90	-	2	
2001–02 ᵜ	3rd in Pool 5	6	2	1	3	126	198	-72	-	5	
2002–03 ᵜ	3rd in Pool 3	6	2	0	4	86	185	+74	-	19	
2003–04 ᵜ	2nd round	4	3	0	1	107	66	+41	-	-	(lost to Saracens on aggregate)
2004–05 ᵜ	4th in Pool 3	6	0	0	6	107	186	-79	2	2	
2005–06	4th in Pool 5	6	1	0	5	131	190	-59	2	6	
2006–07	2nd in Pool 2	6	4	1	1	204	72	+132	4	22	(lost to Saracens in Qtr-Final)
2007–08	3rd in Pool 4	6	3	0	3	130	127	+3	4	16	
2008–09	3rd in Pool 5	6	2	0	4	134	150	-16	4	12	
2009–10	3rd in Pool 2	6	2	0	4	120	140	-20	1	9	
2010–11	3rd In Pool 6	6	3	0	3	116	141	-25	0	12	
2011–12	2nd in Pool 3	6	2	1	3	131	190	-59	2	12	
2012–13	4th in Pool 4	6	1	0	5	70	105	-35	2	6	
2013–14	4th in Pool 2	6	2	0	4	98	130	-32	3	11	
2014–15	3rd in Pool 4	6	3	0	3	108	84	+24	3	15	
2015–16	3rd in Pool 3	6	3	0	3	114	96	+18	2	14	
2016–17	2nd in Pool 1	6	4	0	2	160	86	+74	3	19	(lost to Saracens in Qtr-Final)
2017–18	4th in Pool 3	6	1	0	5	128	199	-71	3	7	
2018–19	2nd in Pool 3	6	4	0	2	147	119	+28	3	19	(lost to Saracens in Qtr-Final)
2019–20	2nd in Pool 2	6	3	1	2	141	115	+26	3	17	
2020–21	12th in Pool B	2	0	0	2	0	70	-70	0	0	Glasgow penalised after not fielding a team against Lyon due to covid
2021–22	9th in Pool A	4	1	0	3	82	117	-35	1	5	
2022–23	2nd in Pool A & RU	4	3	1	0	107	82	+25	2	16	(lost to Toulon in Final)
2023–24	3rd in Pool C	4	2	0	2	77	63	+14	2	10	(lost to Harlequins in last 16)
2024–25	2nd in Pool 4	4	2	0	2	103	92	+11	4	12	(lost to Leinster in Qtr-Final)
2025–26	1st in Pool 1	4	4	0	0	115	66	+49	4	20	(lost to Toulon in Qtr-Final)

== Finals results ==
=== Pro12/Pro14/United Rugby Championship ===
Date	Winners	Score	Runners-up	Venue	Spectators
31 May 2014	Leinster Rugby	34–12	Glasgow Warriors	RDS Arena, Dublin	19,200
30 May 2015	Glasgow Warriors	31–13	Munster Rugby	Ravenhill Stadium, Belfast	17,057
25 May 2019	Leinster Rugby	18–15	Glasgow Warriors	Celtic Park, Glasgow	47,128
22 June 2024	Glasgow Warriors	21–16	Bulls	Loftus Versfeld Stadium	50,388

=== European Challenge Cup ===
Date	Winners	Score	Runners-up	Venue	Spectators
19 May 2023	Toulon	43–19	Glasgow Warriors	Aviva Stadium, Dublin	31,514

== List of games played against international opposition ==
For international games in amateur era see: Glasgow District
Competing as Glasgow Warriors unless stated. Scores and results list Glasgow Warrior's points tally first.
Competing as ᵜ Glasgow Rugby. Competing as ^{β} Glasgow Caledonian Reds.

Year	Date	Opponent	Venue	Result	Score	Tour
1998	10 November	South Africa	Firhill Stadium, Glasgow	Loss ^{β}	9–62	1998 South Africa rugby union tour of Britain and Ireland
1998	18 November	(Māori people) Māori All Blacks	McDiarmid Park, Perth	Loss ^{β}	15–53	Preview Report
1998	24 November	Fiji	Firhill Stadium, Glasgow	Win ^{β}	41–22	Preview Report
1999	12 August	Uruguay A	Fletcher's Fields, Markham, Ontario	Win ^{β}	68–8	Report
2003	4 February	Scotland U21	Hallhill, Dunbar	Win ᵜ	34–14	Report
2004	2 February	Scotland U21	Murrayfield Stadium, Edinburgh	Win ᵜ	43–0	Report
2006	13 November	Scotland U20	Meggetland Sports Complex, Edinburgh	Win	33–19	Report
2015	29 August	Canada	Graves-Oakley Memorial Park, Halifax	Loss	12–19	2015 Rugby World Cup warm-up matches
2016	30 August	Canada A	Bridgehaugh Park, Stirling	Win	63–0	Preview Report

== Current standings ==
=== United Rugby Championship ===
Pos	Team	Pld	W	D	L	PF	PA	PD	TF	TA	TB	LB	Pts	Qualification
1	Glasgow Warriors	5	4	1	0	148	112	+36	22	15	5	0	23	Qualification for the Champions Cup and knockout stage
2	Bulls	5	4	0	1	214	106	+108	31	15	4	1	21	Qualification for the Champions Cup and knockout stage
3	Stormers	5	4	0	1	166	101	+65	24	14	4	1	21	Qualification for the Champions Cup and knockout stage
4	Sharks	5	4	0	1	140	107	+33	20	16	3	0	19	Qualification for the Champions Cup and knockout stage
5	Edinburgh	5	4	0	1	123	95	+28	17	12	3	0	19	Qualification for the Champions Cup and knockout stage
6	Leinster	5	3	0	2	149	81	+68	23	11	4	2	18	Qualification for the Champions Cup and knockout stage
7	Cardiff	5	3	0	2	113	107	+6	17	17	2	0	14	Qualification for the Champions Cup and knockout stage
8	Dragons	5	2	1	2	137	128	+9	20	20	3	1	14	Qualification for the Champions Cup and knockout stage
9	Ospreys	5	2	0	3	112	147	−35	18	21	3	0	11	Qualification for the Challenge Cup
10	Benetton	5	1	1	3	115	104	+11	16	17	2	3	11	Qualification for the Challenge Cup
11	Connacht	5	2	0	3	109	161	−52	18	24	2	0	10	Qualification for the Challenge Cup
12	Munster	5	1	1	3	93	113	−20	12	17	2	2	10	Qualification for the Challenge Cup
13	Lions	5	2	0	3	107	162	−55	15	25	1	0	9	Qualification for the Challenge Cup
14	Scarlets	5	1	0	4	134	191	−57	20	29	4	1	9	Qualification for the Challenge Cup
15	Ulster	5	0	2	3	121	160	−39	18	22	4	1	9	Qualification for the Challenge Cup
16	Zebre	5	0	0	5	93	199	−106	14	30	2	0	2	Qualification for the Challenge Cup

Updated to match(es) played on 2nd November 2026. Source: UnitedRugby.com
Rules for classification: Tiebreakers for teams tied on points: 1) Number of matches won 2) The difference between points for and points against 3) The number of tries scored 4) The most points scored 5) The difference between tries for and tries against 6) The fewest red cards received 7) The fewest yellow cards received.

=== European Champions Cup ===
European Rugby Champions Cup Pool 1
Pos	Team	Pld	W	D	L	PF	PA	PD	TF	TA	TB	LB	Pts	Qualification
1	(Ireland) Leinster	1	1	0	0	48	23	+25	7	2	1	0	5	Champions Cup round of 16.
2	(France) Pau	1	1	0	0	41	17	+24	5	2	1	0	5	Champions Cup round of 16.
3	(Scotland) Glasgow Warriors	1	1	0	0	47	27	+20	7	4	1	0	5	Champions Cup round of 16.
4	(England) Sale Sharks	1	0	0	1	27	47	−20	4	7	0	0	0	Champions Cup or Challenge Cup round of 16 based on table points amongst non-top-three teams.
5	(England) Leicester Tigers	1	0	0	1	17	41	−24	2	5	0	0	0	Champions Cup or Challenge Cup round of 16 based on table points amongst non-top-three teams.
6	(France) Clermont	1	0	0	1	23	48	−25	2	7	0	0	0	Champions Cup or Challenge Cup round of 16 based on table points amongst non-top-three teams.

Updated to match(es) played on 18 October 2026. Source: EPCR
Rules for classification: Tiebreakers for teams tied on points: 1) Number of matches won; 2) Difference between points for and against; 3) Total number of points for; 4) Aggregate number of points scored in matches between tied teams; 5) Number of matches won excluding the first match, then the second and so on until the tie is settled.

== Coaches and management ==
=== Coaches ===
Position	Name	Nationality
Head coach	Franco Smith	South Africa
Assistant coach	Nigel Carolan	Ireland
Assistant coach	Scott Forrest	Scotland
Scrum Coach	Alasdair Dickinson	Scotland

=== Management ===
Position	Name	Nationality
Chairman	Charles Shaw	Scotland
Managing director	Kenny Brown	Scotland
Advisory Board Member	Walter Malcolm	Scotland
Advisory Board Member	Paul Taylor	Scotland
Advisory Board Member	Jim Preston	Scotland
Advisory Board Member	Douglas McCrea	Scotland
Advisory Board Member	Alan Lees	Scotland

== Current squad ==
2026-27 Glasgow Warriors squad
**Props**: (Scotland) **Zander Fagerson**; (South Africa) Leon Lyons; (Scotland) **Nathan McBeth**; (Scotland) **Fin Richardson**; (Namibia) Patrick Schickerling; (Scotland) **Rory Sutherland**; (Australia) **Sam Talakai**; (Scotland) **Murphy Walker**; **Hookers**: (Scotland) **Gregor Hiddleston**; (England) **Jack Singleton**; (Scotland) **Seb Stephen**; (Australia) Tavi Tuipulotu *; **Locks**: (Scotland) Ryan Burke; (Scotland) **Alex Craig**; (Scotland) **Scott Cummings**; (Scotland) Jare Oguntibeju; (Scotland) **Alex Samuel**; (Scotland) **Max Williamson**	**Back row**: (Scotland) **Gregor Brown**; (Scotland) **Rory Darge**; (Scotland) Macenzzie Duncan; (Scotland) **Matt Fagerson**; (Scotland) Euan Ferrie; (Scotland) Angus Fraser; (Scotland) Ruaraidh Hart; (Scotland) Ally Miller; (Scotland) **Jamie Ritchie**; (South Africa) Ruwald Van Der Merwe; **Scrum-halves**: (Scotland) Ben Afshar; (Scotland) **Jamie Dobie**; (Scotland) **George Horne**; (Scotland) Jack Oliver; **Fly-halves**: (Scotland) Dan Lancaster; (Scotland) Charlie Savala; (Scotland) Matthew Urwin	**Centres**: (Australia) Bayley Kuenzle; (Scotland) **Stafford McDowall**; (Scotland) Duncan Munn; (Scotland) **Sione Tuipulotu**; (Scotland) Johnny Ventisei; (Scotland) Kerr Yule; **Wings**: (Scotland) Kerr Johnston; (Scotland) **Kyle Rowe**; (Scotland) **Kyle Steyn** **(c)**; (Scotland) Fergus Watson; **Fullbacks**: (New Zealand) Josh McKay; (Scotland) **Ollie Smith**
**(c)** denotes the team captain. **Bold** denotes internationally capped players. * denotes players qualified to play for Scotland on residency or dual nationality. Taking into account signings and departures ahead of 2025–26 season as listed on List of 2025–26 United Rugby Championship transfers. Source:

=== Academy players ===
2026-27 Glasgow Warriors academy squad
**Props**: (Scotland) Ollie McKenna; (Scotland) Max Morrison; (Scotland) Jackson Rennie; (Scotland) Jake Shearer; **Hookers**: (Scotland) Joe Roberts; **Locks**: (Scotland) Dan Halkon	**Back row**: (Scotland) Rory Baxter; (Scotland) Dylan Cockburn; (Scotland) Josh Mackenzie; (Scotland) Lloyd Moncrieff; (Scotland) Harvey Preston; (Scotland) Rory Purvis	**Scrum-halves**: (Scotland) Callum Reidy; **Fly-halves**: (Scotland) Henry Armstrong	**Centres**: (Scotland) Alex Bryden; (Scotland) Campbell Waugh; **Wings**: (Scotland) James Mackenzie; (Scotland) Harry Provan; (Scotland) Guy Rogers; (Scotland) Cameron van Wyk
**(c)** denotes the team captain. **Bold** denotes internationally capped players. * denotes players qualified to play for Scotland on residency or dual nationality. Taking into account signings and departures ahead of 2026-27 season as listed on List of 2026-27 United Rugby Championship transfers. Source:

== Notable former coaches and management ==
=== Former head coaches ===
Coach	Period(s)
(England) Danny Wilson	06/2020 – 06/2022
(New Zealand) Dave Rennie	06/2017 – 05/2020
(Scotland) Gregor Townsend	06/2012 – 05/2017
(Scotland) Sean Lineen	03/2006 – 06/2012
(Scotland) Hugh Campbell	04/2003 – 03/2006
(New Zealand) Kiwi Searancke	06/2002 – 04/2003
(Scotland) Richie Dixon	01/1999 – 06/2002
(New Zealand) Keith Robertson	11/1997 – 01/1999
(New Zealand) Kevin Greene	1996 – 11/1997

=== Former assistant coaches ===
Assistant Coach	Period(s)
(Scotland) Roddy Grant	06/2025 – 10/2026
(Scotland) Peter Murchie	02/2021 – 06/2025
(Scotland) Peter Horne	06/2022 – 11/2023
(Scotland) Kenny Murray	07/2013 – 01/2022
(Scotland) Kelly Brown	08/2020 – 02/2021
(Ireland) Jonny Bell	06/2020 – 06/2021
(South Africa) Petrus du Plessis	06/2019 – 07/2020
(Scotland) John Dalziel	05/2019 – 08/2020
(New Zealand) Jason O'Halloran	05/2017 – 06/2020
(Wales) Jonathan Humphreys	05/2017 – 06/2019
(Scotland) Mike Blair	05/2016 – 06/2019
(England) Dan McFarland	06/2015 – 05/2017
(Scotland) Matt Taylor	06/2012 – 05/2017
(Scotland) Shade Munro	04/2003 – 06/2015
(New Zealand) Gary Mercer	06/2005 – 06/2012
(Scotland) Sean Lineen	04/2003 – 03/2006
(Australia) Steve Anderson	06/2002 – 04/2003
(Scotland) Rob Moffat	01/1999 – 06/2002
(New Zealand) Gordon Macpherson	1996 – 04/2003

=== Former Managing Director / Chief Executive Officers ===
Managing Director / CEO	Period(s)
(Scotland) Al Kellock	4/2021 – 09/2025
(United States) Nathan Bombrys	10/2011 – 03/2021
(Scotland) Kenny Baillie	10/2009 – 09/2011
(Scotland) Ian Riddoch	07/2007 – 07/2009
(Scotland) David Jordan	07/1997 – 01/2005

== Notable former players ==
This section is for FORMER players only. Current players should not be added to this section.

For amateur era see:

For a list of competitive debuts for all professional era players see:

=== Former club captains ===
Club Captain	Period(s)
(New Zealand) Callum Gibbins	2018–2020
(Scotland) Ryan Wilson	2017–2022
(Scotland) Henry Pyrgos	2016–2017
(Scotland) Jonny Gray	2015–2017
(Scotland) Al Kellock	2006–2015
(Scotland) Jon Petrie	2004–2006
(Scotland) Cameron Mather	2003–2004
(Scotland) Andy Nicol	1999–2003
(Scotland) Gordon Bulloch	1996–1999

=== Double centurions ===
Former players who have reached the 200 caps mark for Glasgow Warriors. Competitive matches only.
Players not given a full senior international rugby union cap by their country under World Rugby rules. ♟

- (Scotland) Rob Harley: (2010–22) 267 caps
- (Scotland) Ryan Wilson: (2010–23) 222 caps

=== Centurions ===
Former players who have reached the 100 caps mark for Glasgow Warriors. Competitive matches only.
Players not given a full senior international rugby union cap by their country under World Rugby rules. ♟

- (Scotland) Chris Fusaro: (2010–21) 183 caps
- (Scotland) Peter Horne: (2009–21) 182 caps
- (Scotland) Graeme Morrison: (2003–13) 176 caps
- (Scotland) Pat MacArthur: (2007–18) 165 caps
- (Scotland) Duncan Weir: (2010–16 & 2021–26) 163 caps
- (Scotland) Jon Petrie: (1998–2007) 156 caps
- (Scotland) Alastair Kellock: (2006–15) 156 caps
- (Scotland) Gordon Bulloch: (1996–2005) 151 caps
- (Scotland) Dougie Hall: (1999–2002 & 2007–14) 151 caps
- (Scotland) Moray Low: (2006–14) 150 caps
- (Scotland) Tommy Seymour: (2011–21) 150 caps
- (Scotland) John Barclay: (2005–13) 148 caps
- (Scotland) Graeme Beveridge: (1998–2007) 147 caps
- (Scotland) Henry Pyrgos: (2010–2018) 147 caps
- (Canada) Kevin Tkachuk (2004–2011) 146 caps
- (Scotland) Dan Parks: (2003–2010) 143 caps
- (Scotland) Fraser Brown: (2012–2024) 141 caps
- (Scotland) Andrew Henderson: (2000–2009) 140 caps
- (Fiji) Nikola Matawalu: (2012–15 & 2017–21) 138 caps
- (Scotland) Tim Swinson: (2012–20) 137 caps
- (Scotland) Johnnie Beattie: (2004–12) 137 caps
- (Scotland) Dan Turner♟: (2004–2010) 135 caps
- (Scotland) Donnie Macfadyen: (1999–2008) 132 caps
- (Scotland) Colin Gregor♟: (2003–2011) 130 caps
- (Scotland) Ali Price: (2015–2023) 130 caps
- (Scotland) James Eddie♟: (2004–2016) 126 caps
- (Scotland) Fergus Thomson: (2002–2013) 124 caps
- (Canada) D. T. H. van der Merwe: (2009–15 & 2017–20) 123 caps
- (Scotland) Stuart Hogg: (2010–2019) 121 caps
- (Scotland) Hefin O'Hare♟: (2005–2011) 121 caps
- (Scotland) Tommy Seymour: (2011–2021) 120 caps
- (Scotland) Alex Dunbar: (2009–2019) 119 caps
- (Scotland) Peter Murchie: (2009–2017) 116 caps
- (Cook Islands) Tommy Hayes (1997–2003) 115 caps
- (Scotland) Sean Lamont: (2003–05 & 2012–17) 113 caps
- (Scotland) Gordon Reid: (2010–2017) 113 caps
- (Scotland) Alan Bulloch: (1996–2004) 112 caps
- (Scotland) Ryan Grant: (2010–17 & 2017–18) 112 caps
- (Scotland) Jonny Gray: (2012–2020) 110 caps
- (Scotland) Jon Welsh: (2008–2015) 110 caps
- (Scotland) Alex Allan: (2014–2021) 109 caps
- (Scotland) Sam Pinder: (2003–2009) 106 caps
- (Scotland) Sam Johnson: (2015–2023) 104 caps
- (Scotland) Josh Strauss: (2012–2017) 104 caps
- (Scotland) Oli Kebble: (2017–2024) 104 caps
- (Scotland) Glenn Metcalfe: (1996–2004) 102 caps
- (Scotland) Ed Kalman: (2007–2014) 101 caps
- (Scotland) George Turner: (2017–2024) 101 caps
- (Scotland) Gordon McIlwham: (1996–2002) 100 caps
- (Scotland) Lee Harrison♟ (2000–2006) 100 caps

=== British and Irish Lions from Glasgow Warriors ===
The following former Glasgow players, in addition to representing Scotland, have also represented the British and Irish Lions.

- Mike Blair
- Gordon Bulloch
- Craig Chalmers
- Chris Cusiter
- Allan Dell
- Ross Ford
- Ryan Grant
- Richie Gray
- Stuart Hogg
- Huw Jones
- Sean Maitland
- Euan Murray
- Tommy Seymour
- Andy Nicol
- Ali Price
- Finn Russell
- Tom Smith
- Rob Wainwright
- Jason White

=== Scotland ===
The following (not previously listed above) former Glasgow players have represented Scotland at full international level.

- (Scotland) Willie Anderson
- (Scotland) Adam Ashe
- (Scotland) Mark Bennett
- (Scotland) Simon Berghan
- (Scotland) Hugh Blake
- (Scotland) Kelly Brown
- (Scotland) Kevin Bryce
- (Scotland) Ben Cairns
- (Scotland) Stewart Campbell
- (Scotland) Andy Craig
- (Scotland) James Craig
- (Scotland) Michael Cusack
- (Scotland) Rob Dewey
- (Scotland) Max Evans
- (Scotland) Thom Evans
- (Scotland) Nick Grigg
- (Scotland) Stuart Grimes
- (Scotland) Andrew Hall
- (Scotland) Craig Hamilton
- (Scotland) Grayson Hart
- (Scotland) Dave Hilton
- (Scotland) Tyrone Holmes
- (Scotland) Rory Hughes
- (Scotland) Gary Isaac
- (Scotland) Ian Jardine
- (Scotland) Lee Jones
- (Scotland) Tom Jordan
- (Scotland) Rory Kerr
- (Scotland) Rory Lamont
- (Scotland) Scott Lawson
- (Scotland) John Leslie
- (Scotland) Shaun Longstaff
- (Scotland) Kenny Logan
- (Scotland) Kieran Low
- (Scotland) John Manson
- (Scotland) Cameron Mather
- (Scotland) Murray McCallum
- (Scotland) Byron McGuigan
- (Scotland) Kevin McKenzie
- (Scotland) James McLaren
- (Scotland) Rufus McLean
- (Scotland) Stuart Moffat
- (Scotland) Shade Munro
- (Scotland) Chris Paterson
- (Scotland) Derrick Patterson
- (Scotland) Matt Proudfoot
- (Scotland) D'Arcy Rae
- (Scotland) Roland Reid
- (Scotland) Tom Ryder
- (Scotland) Javan Sebastian
- (Scotland) Rowen Shepherd
- (Scotland) Gordon Simpson
- (Scotland) Robbie Smith
- (Scotland) Derek Stark
- (Scotland) Jon Steel
- (Scotland) Grant Stewart
- (Scotland) Ross Thompson
- (Scotland) Richie Vernon
- (Scotland) Murray Wallace
- (Scotland) Alan Watt
- (Scotland) Andrew Wilson

=== Notable non-Scottish players ===
The following is a list of notable non-Scottish (not previously listed above) international representative former Glasgow players:

Argentina

- (Argentina) Federico Aramburú
- (Argentina) Gabriel Ascárate
- (Argentina) German Araoz
- (Argentina) Sebastián Cancelliere
- (Argentina) Facundo Cordero
- (Argentina) Francisco Leonelli
- (Argentina) Domingo Miotti
- (Argentina) Enrique Pieretto
- (Argentina) José María Núñez Piossek
- (Argentina) Lucio Sordoni
- (Argentina) Bernardo Stortoni

Australia

- (Australia) Cameron Blades
- (Australia) Nick Frisby
- (Australia) Taqele Naiyaravoro

Bahamas

- (The Bahamas) George Hunter

Canada

- (Canada) Connor Braid
- (Canada) Chauncey O'Toole
- (Canada) Taylor Paris
- (Canada) Djustice Sears-Duru

Cook Islands

- (Cook Islands) Mike Beckham

Croatia

- (Croatia) Jordan Lenac

Fiji

- (Fiji) Mesu Dolokoto
- (Fiji) Nemia Kenatale
- (Fiji) Leone Nakarawa
- (Fiji) Jerry Yanuyanutawa

Georgia

- (Georgia (country)) Shalva Mamukashvili

Germany

- (Germany) Hagen Schulte

Hong Kong

- (Hong Kong) Ally Maclay
- (Hong Kong) Callum McFeat Smith
- (Hong Kong) Dave Whiteford

Ireland

- (Ireland) James Downey
- (Ireland) Ian Keatley

Italy

- (Italy) Simone Favaro
- (Italy) Leonardo Sarto
- (Italy) Samuela Vunisa

Namibia

- (Namibia) Tjiuee Uanivi

Netherlands

- (Netherlands) Caleb Korteweg
- (Netherlands) Rob Verbakel

New Zealand

- (New Zealand) Corey Flynn
- (New Zealand) Daryl Gibson
- (New Zealand) Angus Macdonald
- (New Zealand) Lelia Masaga

Samoa

- (Samoa) Brian Alainu'uese
- (Samoa) Lome Fa'atau
- (Samoa) TJ Ioane
- (Samoa) David Lemi
- (Samoa) Opeta Palepoi
- (Samoa) Aki Seiuli
- (Samoa) Justin Va'a

Tonga

- (Tonga) Ofa Faingaʻanuku
- (Tonga) Walter Fifita
- (Tonga) Siua Halanukonuka
- (Tonga) Fotu Lokotui
- (Tonga) Viliami Maʻafu
- (Tonga) Sila Puafisi

UAE

- (United Arab Emirates) Euan McLaren

Uganda

- (Uganda) Tony Nyangweso

USA

- (United States) Langilangi Haupeakui
- (United States) Folau Niua
- (United States) David Tameilau

Zimbabwe

- (Zimbabwe) Denford Mutamangira
- (Zimbabwe) Nico Nyemba

=== Notable also outside rugby ===
The following is a list of notable (not previously listed above) former Glasgow players who have achieved notability in fields outwith rugby:

- (Scotland) Danny Ablett – Royal Navy surgeon, Operational Service Medal for Afghanistan
- (Scotland) Nick Campbell – Scottish heavyweight boxing champion
- (New Zealand) Joe Naufahu – Actor, Game of Thrones season 6
- (Wales) Gerwyn Price – Professional darts player, Professional Darts Corporation, former world number one and 2021 world champion.

== Personnel honours and records ==
=== Celtic League Team of the Year ===
- 2006–07: (Scotland) Euan Murray (1)
- 2007–08: no Glasgow Warriors represented (0)
- 2008–09: no Glasgow Warriors represented (0)
- 2009–10: (Scotland) Al Kellock, (Scotland) John Barclay, (Scotland) Dan Parks (3)
- 2010–11: (Scotland) Richie Gray (1)

=== Pro12 Team of the Year ===
- 2011–12: (Scotland) Jon Welsh, (Scotland) Tom Ryder, (Scotland) Duncan Weir (3)
- 2012–13: (Scotland) Ryan Grant, (Scotland) Al Kellock, (Fiji) Nikola Matawalu, (Scotland) Stuart Hogg Glasgow Warriors players top representations (4)
- 2013–14: (Scotland) Alex Dunbar (1)
- 2014–15: (Scotland) Josh Strauss, (Scotland) Peter Horne, (Scotland) Tommy Seymour (3)
- 2015–16: (Fiji) Leone Nakarawa (1)
- 2016–17: (Scotland) Tommy Seymour (1)

=== Pro14 Team of the Year ===
- 2017–18: (New Zealand) Callum Gibbins (capt), (Scotland) Nick Grigg (2)
- 2018–19: (Scotland) Zander Fagerson (1)
- 2019–20: no Glasgow Warriors represented (0)
- 2020–21: (Scotland) Huw Jones (1)

=== United Rugby Championship Team of the Year ===
- 2021–22: no Glasgow Warriors represented (0)
- 2022–23: (Scotland) Sione Tuipulotu (1)
- 2023–24: (Scotland) Sione Tuipulotu (1)
- 2024–25: (Scotland) Rory Darge (1)
- 2025–26: (Scotland) Stafford McDowall, (Scotland) Kyle Rowe (2)
