= Harris Academicals RFC =

Scottish rugby union club, based in Dundee

(Scotland) Harris Academy FPRFC
- Full name: Harris Academy Former Pupils Rugby Football Club
- Union: Scottish Rugby Union
- Founded: 1926; 100 years ago
- Location: Dundee, Scotland
- Ground: Elliot Road
- President: Marc Wilson
- Coach: Ryan Beattie
- Captain: Graham Hopkins
- League: Caledonia Midlands Non-League
- 2024–25: Caledonia Midlands Two, 3rd of 9
Team kit

Official website
- www.harrisrugby.com

Harris Academy FPRFC is a rugby union club based in Dundee, Scotland, that was founded for the former pupils of Harris Academy on 5 November 1926. The club ceased to exist throughout the latter part of the 1990s and the early 2000s due to dwindling numbers. However, the club was reformed in August 2007 by former players combined with a large senior squad of players who had left the school the previous season. Those places had had a successful tour to Latvia in which they beat a local club side before beinvolved beaten by a Latvian under 19 select squad.

The club plays its home games at Elliot Road and a new partnership with the Hillcrest Bowling Club who provide a club house offering post-match food and beverages.

Harris FP's currently compete in Caledonia Midlands Non-League.

The club are currently going through a rebuilding phase during a difficult time for rugby in Dundee with player numbers dwindling across the city. Despite this, the club committee, under the leadership of current President Mr Marc Wilson have worked tirelessly to develop the club and alongside the coaching team have increased player number to 40 registered players for the current season.

The club is coached by Ryan Beattie (head coach) and club stalwart Kenny Clarkson (assistant coach) with training sessions held on Tuesday and Thursday evenings at Elliot Road.

== 2008/09 season ==
In this season, Harris made its first real promotion fight. The club began the season by making Bruce "Brucee" Beckett Head Coach; he far exceeded their coaching expectations having been with the much better Dundee HSFP. Under his direction Harris narrowly missed out on promotion to Alloa RFC, and reached the 3rd round of the Scottish Cup competition where they were narrowly defeated by Hillfoots RFC (a club 3 leagues above Harris).

== 2007/08 season ==
Pre-season training began in late June for the club's first season back at competitive level. Numbers were constantly increasing in the buildup to the season, with Harris playing "friendly" warm up matches in the form of Madras RFC and an inner squad match. Coaching for this season came largely in the form of sessions taken by Kenneth Clarkson at both Elliot Road when weather permitted it and in the Harris Academy boys gym. On match day Bruce Dyer (club treasurer) acted largely as the club manager. In this season the club qualified for the top half of the split, as they finished in the top half of the league after round 1 of games eventually finishing 5th in the Caledonia 2 proving that they were a more than adequate addition to the roster. The club reached the quarter-finals of the Scottish Plate competition who were they eliminated by eventual winners Aberdeen University RFC. The club went on to tour to Whitley Bay and Newcastle where they competed in a 10-a-side tournament.

== Honours ==
- Midlands District Sevens
  - Champions: 1951
- Howe of Fife Sevens
  - Champions: 1979
