= Jonny Gray =

Scotland international rugby union player

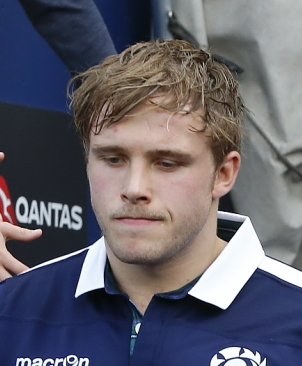
- Gray with Scotland in 2017
- Born: Jonathan Douglas Gray; 14 March 1994 (age 32) Rutherglen, Scotland
- Height: 1.98 m (6 ft 6 in)
- Weight: 121 kg (19.1 st; 267 lb)
- Notable relative: Richie Gray (brother)

Rugby union career
- Position: Lock
- Current team: Bordeaux
Amateur team(s)
Years	Team	Apps	(Points)
2017–2020	Currie		
Senior career
Years	Team	Apps	(Points)
2012–2020	Glasgow Warriors	110	(60)
2020–2024	Exeter Chiefs	33	(45)
2024–	Bordeaux	0	(0)
- Correct as of 14 September 2022
International career
Years	Team	Apps	(Points)
- Scotland U18
2012–13	Scotland U20	9	(0)
2014–	Scotland 'A'	2	(0)
2013–	Scotland	83	(25)
- Correct as of 22 July 2026

15th Sir Willie Purves Quaich
- In office 2014–2014
- Preceded by: Sean Kennedy
- Succeeded by: Finn Russell

Jonathan Douglas Gray (born 14 March 1994) is a Scotland international rugby union player. He plays at lock for Bordeaux in Top 14.

== Rugby union career ==
=== Amateur career ===
Gray started playing rugby at Cambuslang RFC where he progressed from the mini section (at 7 years old) through to first XV regular at the age of 16. He also played for Calderglen High School in East Kilbride.

Gray is the younger brother of Scottish and British and Irish Lion international Richie Gray.

Gray was drafted to Currie in the Scottish Premiership for the 2017–18 season.

=== Professional career ===
In 2013, Gray was offered a full-time contract for three years by Glasgow Warriors Domestically, the 2014–15 season saw Gray play a prominent role in Glasgow Warriors' maiden Pro12 title triumph.

At just 21 years of age, Gray was named captain of Glasgow Warriors in November 2015, taking over from recently retired mentor Alastair Kellock. He became a co-captain with Henry Pyrgos for the 2016–17 season but following the arrival of Dave Rennie as Warriors' head coach, the club reverted to a sole captaincy. For the 2017–18 season Rennie named Ryan Wilson as captain though Gray remained in the leadership group.

In December 2017, it was announced that Gray had extended his contract at the Warriors until May 2020, after rejecting an offer from Bristol Rugby. It was announced in January 2020 that Gray would join Exeter Chiefs on a two-year contract ahead of the 2020–21 season, joining up with his Scotland teammates Stuart Hogg, Sam Skinner and Sam Hidalgo-Clyne.

On 4 July 2024, Gray signed for French side Bordeaux, competing in the Top 14 competition for the 2024–25 season, after his early departure from Exeter. Transferred from Bordeaux to Perpignan (USAP) in March 2026.

=== International career ===
In 2012, Gray was announced in the Scotland national under-20 rugby union team for the 2012 Six Nations Under-20s Championship and retained his position for the 2013 season where he was named captain.

In 2013 Gray was included in a 41-man squad for Scotland's senior side in the 2013 end-of-year rugby union tests.

Gray played in every match for Scotland during the 2015 6 Nations, attempting an astonishing 85 tackles in total and missing only one. Subsequently, he was selected in Scotland's 31-man squad for the 2015 Rugby World Cup, playing four of their five matches in the run to the Quarter-Finals.

As of November 2017, Gray has scored four tries for Scotland, including scores in consecutive weeks against the All Blacks and Australia during the Autumn Internationals

After playing in the first two games of the 2020 Six Nations, Gray sustained a hand injury ruling him out of the rest of the tournament.

He played for Scotland 'A' on 6 February 2026 in their match against Italy XV.

Appearances and tries by national team and year
National team	Year	Apps	Tries
Scotland	2013	2	0
Scotland	2014	6	1
Scotland	2015	11	0
Scotland	2016	9	1
Scotland	2017	10	2
Scotland	2018	9	0
Scotland	2019	8	0
Scotland	2020	6	0
Scotland	2021	3	0
Scotland	2022	8	0
Scotland	2023	5	0
Total		77	4

== Honours ==
Glasgow Warriors:

1x United Rugby Championship; (2014/15)

Exeter Chiefs:

1x Investec Champions Cup; (2019/20)

1x Gallagher Premiership; (2019/20)

Union Bordeaux Begles;

2x Investec Champions Cup; (2024/25),(2025/26)

== Supplement ==
Sporting positions
Preceded by Grant Gilchrist, Harry Leonard, George Turner	John Macphail Scholarship; Jonny Gray, Gregor Hunter; 2012	Succeeded by Finn Russell, Sam Hidalgo-Clyne
