= Kevin Bryce =

Scotland international rugby union player

Kevin Tuckerman Bryce
- Born: Kevin Tuckerman Bryce; 7 September 1988 (age 38) Alloa, Scotland
- Height: 1.85 m (6 ft 1 in)
- Weight: 106 kg (16 st 10 lb; 234 lb)
- Notable relative(s): Glenn Bryce, Layton Bryce (son)

Rugby union career
- Position(s): Hooker, Prop
- Current team: Glasgow Warriors
Amateur team(s)
Years	Team	Apps	(Points)
- Alloa
- Heriots
- Stirling County
2019-	Glasgow High Kelvinside		
- Correct as of 23 June 2019
Senior career
Years	Team	Apps	(Points)
2013–2016	Glasgow Warriors	10	(5)
2013–2014	→London Irish	0	(0)
2016–2018	Edinburgh Rugby	12	(0)
2018	→Yorkshire Carnegie	6	(0)
2018–2019	Glasgow Warriors	13	(0)
- Correct as of 23 June 2019
International career
Years	Team	Apps	(Points)
2006	Scotland U18		
2007	Scotland U19	6	(0)
2013	Scotland Club XV	2	(0)
2014	Scotland A	1	(0)
2013–2015	Scotland	3	(0)
- Correct as of 22 March 2018
Coaching career
- Years: Team
- 2019–: Glasgow High Kelvinside (Asst.)

Kevin Bryce (born 7 September 1988) is a former Scotland international rugby union player who played as a Hooker for United Rugby Championship side Glasgow Warriors. He has also played at Tighthead Prop and Flanker and previously played for Edinburgh and Yorkshire Carnegie.

== Rugby Union career ==
=== Amateur career ===
He started in the Alloa RFC youth set-up.

Before professional club rugby union, Bryce played for Heriot's Rugby Club in the Scottish Premiership, still representing them between the odd cap for Glasgow.

Following the 2007 U19 international championship, Bryce was named the recipient for the John Macphail Scholarship for the 2007 season. The Scholarship will allow Bryce to develop his skills and play club rugby in Auckland, New Zealand, alongside experienced All Black players. Former plays to gain the scholarship include, John Barclay and Sevens player Graham Hogg.

It was announced that from the 2019–20 season, Bryce would be taking up a player-coach role at Glasgow High Kelvinside.

=== Professional career ===
Bryce has only been playing professional rugby since February 2014, but has been involved in a professional set-up since the beginning of the 2013–14 season. He did initially join the Warriors on a short-term basis in February 2013 due to the loss of frontline hookers to international duty and injury, but was unable to earn a cap.

In May 2013, Bryce signed a one-year contract with Glasgow Warriors, for the 2013–14 season. However, in December 2013, Bryce joined English club London Irish on loan to cover the international capped player, David Paice. However, Bryce did not play any games for London Irish.

He made his professional début for Glasgow Warriors on 23 February 2014 against the Newport Gwent Dragons during the 62nd minute.

In March 2014, after earning his first professional cap, Bryce signed a new contract with Glasgow Warriors, extending his stay at the Scotstoun until May 2016.

Bryce moved to Edinburgh in 2016. Edinburgh saw Bryce as a Tighthead Prop and he retrained in that role for the club.

He went on loan to Yorkshire Carnegie in 2018.

On 9 July 2018 it was announced that Glasgow Warriors had re-signed Bryce. In their statement, the club's forward coach Jonathan Humphreys stated:

"I always preferred Kev as a hooker and he has a chance with us now to see if he can reach the high standards he achieved a few years ago when he was playing international rugby."

=== International career ===
Kevin had played for Scotland at various age grade level. In 2006, he represented Scotland under-18's, before representing Scotland under-19's in 2007. During 2007, Bryce was part of the Scotland Under 19's team that went to the 2007 Under-19 Rugby World Championship in Ireland, in which Bryce played every match.

In a warm-up match against Italy under-19 for the Under-19 Championship, Bryce captained the side from the Openside, in which Scotland under-19's lost 19–13.

In 2013, while playing for Heriot's, Bryce was selected for the winning Scotland Club XV side that beat an Ireland Club XV side 30–18 to reclaim the Dalriada Cup for the first time since 2009. He was one of 17 uncapped players in the squad, with Bryce making his appearance of the bench. Bryce was benched for the match against the France Club XV side, in which the Scottish side lost 44–10.

In January 2014, Bryce played for the Scotland A side against the England Saxons at Scotstoun Stadium. Bryce came off the bench in the 73rd minute, to play for his fourth Scottish national team - Scotland A drew 16–16 with the Saxons.

On 20 May 2014, Bryce was one of six uncapped players named in the 43-man dual-squad, for the Scottish national side's summer tour to the United States, Canada, Argentina and South Africa. He was called up to Scotland's 2015 Rugby World Cup squad to replace the injured Stuart McInally.

=== Coaching career ===
It was announced that from the 2019–20 season, Bryce would be taking up a player-coach role at Glasgow High Kelvinside.

Sporting positions
Preceded by Graham Hogg	John Macphail Scholarship; Kevin Bryce; 2007	Succeeded by Roddy Grant
