= Callum Hunter-Hill =

Scottish rugby union player (born 1997)

- Born: Callum Hunter-Hill; 27 February 1997 (age 29) Melrose, Scotland
- Height: 6 ft 7 in (2.01 m)
- Weight: 255 lb 116 kg (18 st 4 lb)
- School: Stewart's Melville College

Rugby union career
- Position: Lock
Amateur team(s)
Years	Team	Apps	(Points)
- Stirling County
Senior career
Years	Team	Apps	(Points)
2015–17	Glasgow Warriors	1	(0)
2016–17	→ London Scottish	7	(0)
2017–19	Edinburgh Rugby	19	(0)
2018–19	→ Newcastle Falcons	1	(0)
2019–24	Saracens	68	(0)
2024-25	Northampton Saints	7	(0)
2025-	Edinburgh Rugby		
International career
Years	Team	Apps	(Points)
	Scotland U18	10	(0)
2016–	Scotland U20	19	(10)

Callum Hunter-Hill (born 27 February 1997 in Melrose, Scotland) is a Scottish rugby union player who plays for Edinburgh. He typically plays second-row. He previously played for Glasgow Warriors, London Scottish, Newcastle Falcons, Saracens and Northampton Saints.

== Rugby Union career ==
=== Amateur career ===
Whilst in Gullane Primary School, Hunter-Hill first played mini rugby for North Berwick Rugby Club. His rugby talent was spotted while at Stewart's Melville College. He won the Brewin Dolphin Shield with Stewart's Melville.

He later won a place to be coached in New Zealand in the summer of 2015 winning the prestigious John Macphail Scholarship. He spent 15 weeks there. He played for Stirling County, captaining the side, when not involved in Warriors duty.

=== Professional career ===
He was named as part of the new Glasgow district Rugby Academy founded by the Scottish Rugby Union in 2015.

He made his debut for Glasgow Warriors coming off the bench in a friendly against the Army Rugby Union side in September 2015. The Warriors won the match 71–0.

Hunter-Hill again turned out for the Warriors in the pre-season match against Harlequins on 20 August 2016.

He made his competitive debut for the Warriors on 8 October 2016 when he replaced Rob McAlpine in the away match against Zebre in the Pro12.

On 16 November 2016 it was announced that Hunter-Hill had joined London Scottish in a short-term loan move.

On 15 May 2017 it was announced that he had secured a professional contract and signed for Edinburgh Rugby.

On 13 September 2019 it was announced that he was joining Saracens on academy loan. He has since signed a long term permanent contract to remain at Saracens until 2023.

He helped Saracens win the Premiership title in 2023, featuring as a replacement in the final as Saracens defeated Sale Sharks.

On the 28th June, 2024, it was announced Hunter-Hill had signed for the former Premiership champions of the previous season Northampton Saints.

He re-signed for Edinburgh Rugby on 30 June 2025.

=== International career ===
He played for Scotland for the under-18s and captained the side. He captained Scotland U20s.

Sporting positions
Preceded by Ewan McQuillin, Adam Ashe	John Macphail Scholarship; Ben Robbins, Callum Hunter-Hill; 2015	Succeeded by Patrick Kelly, Ross McCann
