= 2016–17 National League 1 =

Rugby union competition in England

- Countries: England
- Date: 3 September 2016 – 29 April 2017
- Champions: Hartpury College (1st title)
- Runners-up: Plymouth Albion
- Relegated: Macclesfield, Blaydon
- Matches played: 240
- Attendance: 140,695 (average 586 per match)
- Highest attendance: 2,712; Coventry v Birmingham Moseley (18 December 2016)
- Lowest attendance: 113; Loughborough Students v Blaydon (7 January 2017); Loughborough Students v Old Albanian (4 February 2017)
- Tries scored: 1802 (average 7.5 per match)
- Top point scorer: (Scotland) Harry Leonard (Rosslyn Park) (265 points)
- Top try scorer: (Lithuania) Jonas Mikalcius (Hartpury College) (34 tries)

The 2016–17 National League 1, known for sponsorship reasons as the SSE National League 1 was the eighth season of the third tier of the English rugby union system, since the professionalised format of the second tier RFU Championship was introduced; and was the 30th season since league rugby began in 1987.

Hartpury College were crowned the champions on 11 March 2017 after winning their 25th match and maintaining their 100% record. The college side went on break more National League 1 records by winning all 30 games and gaining promotion to the highest level in the club's history. Other records by Hartpury included most league points in a season (143), most points scored (1,455), as well as tying with Ealing Trailfinders (2014–15) for most bonus points gained in a season (28).

Due to London Welsh going into liquidation in January 2017 and being expelled from the RFU Championship, only two teams were relegated from National League 1. On 1 April 2017 newly promoted Macclesfield were the first team to be relegated after they lost 18–21 at home to Plymouth Albion. The second relegation spot was keenly contested and went to the last game of the season with 14th placed Hull Ionians 3 points ahead of 15th placed Blaydon. In the end Blaydon lost their final game while Hull Ionians won theirs to finish 6 points clear. It ended a run of 10 years in the 3rd tier for Blaydon.

== Structure ==
The league consisted of sixteen teams with all the teams playing each other on a home and away basis to make a total of thirty matches each. There was one promotion place with the champions promoted to the Greene King IPA Championship. There are usually three relegation places with the bottom three teams relegated to either National League 2 North or National League 2 South depending on the geographical location of the team. Due to the expulsion of the championship team London Welsh in January 2017, there was no relegation from the championship and subsequently only two teams relegated from this league.

== Participating teams and locations ==
National 1 teams in England

Twelve of the sixteen teams participated in the preceding season's competition. The 2015–16 champions, Richmond, were promoted to the 2016–17 RFU Championship and replaced by Birmingham Moseley (who changed their name from Moseley prior to the season) and were relegated from the 2015–16 RFU Championship. The three teams relegated last season, were Henley Hawks and Cinderford (both to the 2016–17 National League 2 South) and Wharfedale (2016–17 National League 2 North) – with Wharfedale dropping from the third tier for the first time in 20 years. The promoted teams are Cambridge and Macclesfield champions of the 2015–16 National League 2 South and 2015–16 National League 2 North respectively, and Old Albanian who won the promotion play-off against Sedgley Park.

Team	Ground	Capacity	City/Area	Previous season
Ampthill	Dillingham Park	3,000	Ampthill, Bedfordshire	4th
Birmingham Moseley	Billesley Common	5,000 (1,300 seated)	Birmingham, West Midlands	Relegated from RFU Championship
Blackheath	Well Hall	1,650 (550 seats) (Note: Blackheath moved from the Rectory Field to Well Hall for the 2016–17 season.)	Eltham, Greenwich, Greater London	3rd
Blaydon	Crow Trees	2,000 (400 seats)	Swalwell, Tyne and Wear	11th
Cambridge	Grantchester Road	2,200 (200 seats)	Cambridge, Cambridgeshire	Promoted from National League 2 South (champions)
Coventry	Butts Park Arena	4,000 (3,000 seats)	Coventry, West Midlands	9th
Darlington Mowden Park	Northern Echo Arena	25,000	Darlington, County Durham	6th
Esher	Molesey Road	3,500 (1,200 seats)	Hersham, Surrey	7th
Fylde	Woodlands Memorial Ground	7,500 (500 seats)	Lytham St. Annes, Lancashire	10th
Hartpury College	College Stadium	2,000	Hartpury, Gloucestershire	2nd
Hull Ionians	Brantingham Park	1,500 (240 seats)	Brantingham, East Riding of Yorkshire	12th
Loughborough Students	Loughborough University Stadium	3,000	Loughborough, Leicestershire	13th
Macclesfield	Priory Park	1,250 (250 seats)	Macclesfield, Cheshire	Promoted from National League 2 North (champions)
Old Albanian	Woollam Playing Fields	1,000	St Albans, Hertfordshire	Promoted from National League 2 South (play-off)
Plymouth Albion	The Brickfields	8,500	Plymouth, Devon	8th
Rosslyn Park	The Rock	2,000 (630 seats)	Roehampton, London	5th

== League table ==
2016–17 National League 1 table
Pos	Team	Pld	W	D	L	PF	PA	PD	TB	LB	Pts	Qualification
1	Hartpury College (P)	30	30	0	0	1455	532	+923	28	0	148	Promoted
2	Plymouth Albion	30	24	0	6	879	523	+356	17	5	118	
3	Ampthill	30	22	0	8	844	584	+260	17	3	108	
4	Coventry	30	20	1	9	974	733	+241	17	2	101	
5	Birmingham Moseley	30	20	0	10	854	682	+172	15	3	98	
6	Rosslyn Park	30	16	1	13	867	682	+185	13	7	86	
7	Blackheath	30	14	1	15	692	724	−32	13	4	75	
8	Esher	30	13	0	17	828	854	−26	16	6	74	
9	Old Albanian	30	13	0	17	749	926	−177	14	5	71	
10	Darlington Mowden Park	30	13	1	16	695	791	−96	10	5	69	
11	Loughborough Students	30	10	1	19	905	966	−61	16	8	66	
12	Fylde	30	10	0	20	691	1050	−359	15	4	59	
13	Hull Ionians	30	10	1	19	679	944	−265	9	7	58	
14	Cambridge	30	8	1	21	779	994	−215	18	6	58	
15	Blaydon (R)	30	8	2	20	642	1010	−368	10	6	52	Relegated
16	Macclesfield (R)	30	4	1	25	579	1117	−538	8	5	31	Relegated

Updated to match(es) played on 29 April 2017. Source: "National League 1". NCA Rugby.
Rules for classification: Points system: 4 points for a win; 2 points for a draw; 1 point if a team loses by seven points or less (losing bonus); 1 point if the team scores four or more tries in a match (try bonus)
- If teams are level at any stage, tiebreakers are applied in the following order:
1. Number of matches won
2. Difference between points for and against
3. Total number of points for
4. Aggregate number of points scored in matches between tied teams
5. Number of matches won excluding the first match, then the second and so on until the tie is settled
  (P) Promoted; (R) Relegated

== Fixtures ==
=== Round 1 ===
3 September 2016
14:30

Blaydon	3 – 35	Old Albanian (BP)

Crow Trees
Attendance: 210
Referee: Jack Makepeace

3 September 2016
14:30

(BP) Hartpury College	34 – 0	Blackheath

College Stadium
Attendance: 317
Referee: Veryan Boscawen

3 September 2016
15:00

Ampthill	24 – 15	Rosslyn Park

Dillingham Park
Attendance: 478
Referee: Ben Blain

3 September 2016
15:00

(BP) Coventry	54 – 14	Loughborough Students

Butts Park Arena
Attendance: 983
Referee: Adam Leal

3 September 2016
15:00

Esher	21 – 19	Macclesfield (BP)

Molesey Road
Attendance: 453
Referee: Tim Baker

3 September 2016
15:00

(BP) Fylde	20 – 25	Birmingham Moseley

Woodlands Memorial Ground
Attendance: 575
Referee: Matt Turvey

3 September 2016
15:00

Hull Ionians	16 – 10	Darlington Mowden Park (BP)

Brantingham Park
Attendance: 262
Referee: Jamie Leahy

3 September 2016
15:00

Plymouth Albion	23 – 18	Cambridge (BP)

Brickfields
Attendance: 688
Referee: Fergus Kirby

=== Round 2 ===
10 September 2016
14:00

Loughborough Students	13 – 6	Hull Ionians (BP)

Loughborough University Stadium
Attendance: 123
Referee: Shane Lewis

10 September 2016
14:30

(BP) Hartpury College	37 – 14	Plymouth Albion

College Stadium
Attendance: 372
Referee: James Leahy

10 September 2016
15:00

Birmingham Moseley	14 – 7	Coventry (BP)

Billesley Common
Attendance: 1,232
Referee: Veryan Boscawen

10 September 2016
15:00

Blackheath	13 – 6	Esher (BP)

Well Hall
Attendance: 527
Referee: James Philip Clarke

10 September 2016
15:00

Darlington Mowden Park	15 – 14	Blaydon (BP)

Northern Echo Arena
Attendance: 940
Referee: Neil Chivers

10 September 2016
15:00

(BP) Macclesfield	44 – 22	Fylde

Priory Park
Attendance: 300
Referee: Simon Harding

10 September 2016
15:00

(BP) Old Albanian	17 – 18	Ampthill

Woollam Playing Fields
Attendance: 325
Referee: Fergus Kirby

10 September 2016
15:00

(BP) Rosslyn Park	19 – 22	Cambridge

The Rock
Attendance: 768
Referee: Gareth Holsgrove

=== Round 3 ===
17 September 2016
14:30

(BP) Blaydon	38 – 66	Loughborough Students (BP)

Crow Trees
Attendance: 250
Referee: Ben Blain

17 September 2016
15:00

Ampthill	20 – 39	Darlington Mowden Park (BP)

Dillingham Park
Attendance: 319
Referee: Veryan Boscawen

17 September 2016
15:00

(2BP) Cambridge	34 – 36	Old Albanian (BP)

Grantshester Road
Attendance: 410
Referee: James Sullivan

17 September 2016
15:00

(BP) Coventry	61 – 14	Macclesfield

Butts Park Arena
Attendance: 1,089
Referee: Darren Gamage

17 September 2016
15:00

Esher	13 – 32	Hartpury College (BP)

Molesey Road
Attendance: 479
Referee: Fergus Kirby

17 September 2016
15:00

(2BP) Fylde	24 – 25	Blackheath

Woodlands Memorial Ground
Attendance: 615
Referee: Jamie Leahy

17 September 2016
15:00

(BP) Hull Ionians	22 – 24	Birmingham Moseley (BP)

Brantingham Park
Attendance: 203
Referee: Matt Turvey

17 September 2016
15:00

(BP) Plymouth Albion	26 – 20	Rosslyn Park (BP)

Brickfields
Attendance: 917
Referee: Daniel Parrott

=== Round 4 ===
24 September 2016
14:00

(BP) Loughborough Students	29 – 37	Ampthill (BP)

Loughborough University Stadium
Attendance: 543
Referee: Jack Makepeace

24 September 2016
14:30

(BP) Hartpury College	57 – 14	Fylde

College Stadium
Attendance: 200
Referee: Gareth Holsgrove

24 September 2016
15:00

(BP) Birmingham Moseley	41 – 13	Blaydon

Billesley Common
Attendance: 772
Referee: Daniel Parrott

24 September 2016
15:00

(BP) Blackheath	42 – 5	Coventry

Well Hall
Attendance: 914
Referee: Matt Turvey

24 September 2016
15:00

(BP) Darlington Mowden Park	37 – 12	Cambridge

Northern Echo Arena
Attendance: 777
Referee: James Clark

24 September 2016
15:00

(BP) Esher	19 – 21	Plymouth Albion

Molesey Road
Attendance: 475
Referee: James Sullivan

24 September 2016
15:00

Macclesfield	19 – 29	Hull Ionians (BP)

Priory Park
Attendance: 292
Referee: Jamie Leahy

24 September 2016
15:00

Old Albanian	18 – 13	Rosslyn Park (BP)

Woollam Playing Fields
Attendance: 350
Referee: Adam Leal

=== Round 5 ===
1 October 2016
14:30

(BP) Blaydon	24 – 24	Macclesfield (BP)

Crow Trees
Attendance: 250
Referee: Llyr ApGeraint Roberts

1 October 2016
15:00

(BP) Ampthill	26 – 8	Birmingham Moseley

Dillingham Park
Attendance: 472
Referee: Phillip Davies

1 October 2016
15:00

(BP) Cambridge	35 – 34	Loughborough Students (2BP)

Grantchester Road
Attendance: 380
Referee: Adam Leal

1 October 2016
15:00

(BP) Coventry	23 – 27	Hartpury College (BP)

Butts Park Arena
Attendance: 955
Referee: Ben Blain

1 October 2016
15:00

(BP) Fylde	26 – 20	Esher

Woodlands Memorial Ground
Attendance: 547
Referee: Matt Turvey

1 October 216
15:00

(BP) Hull Ionians	30 – 32	Blackheath (BP)

Brantingham Park
Attendance: 223
Referee: Christophe Ridley

1 October 2016
15:00

(BP) Plymouth Albion	40 – 13	Old Albanian

Brickfields
Attendance: 850
Referee: Veryan Boscawen

1 October 2016
15:00

Rosslyn Park	36 – 16	Darlington Mowden Park

The Rock
Attendance: 736
Referee: James Sullivan

=== Round 6 ===
8 October 2016
14:00

Loughborough Students	26 – 26	Rosslyn Park

Loughborough University Stadium
Attendance: 458
Referee: Hamish Smales

8 October 2016
14:30

(BP) Hartpury College	43 – 14	Hull Ionians

College Stadium
Attendance: 363
Referee: James Sullivan

8 October 2016
15:00

(BP) Birmingham Moseley	72 – 14	Cambridge

Billesley Common
Attendance: 1,011
Referee: Jamie Leahy

8 October 2016
15:00

(BP) Blackheath	59 – 17	Blaydon

Well Hall
Attendance: 820
Referee: Veryan Boscawen

8 October 2016
15:00

Darlington Mowden Park	22 – 9	Old Albanian

Northern Echo Arena
Attendance: 1,074
Referee: Matt Tuvey

8 October 2016
15:00

(BP) Esher	31 – 13	Coventry

Molesey Road
Attendance: 598
Referee: Gareth Holsgrove

8 October 2016
15:00

(BP) Fylde	39 – 37	Plymouth Albion (BP)

Woodlands Memorial Ground
Attendance: 685
Referee: Ben Blain

8 October 2016
15:00

Macclesfield	12 – 28	Ampthill (BP)

Priory Park
Attendance: 423
Referee: Michael Hudson

=== Round 7 ===
15 October 2016
14:30

Blaydon	5 – 47	Hartpury College (BP)

Crow Trees
Attendance: 205
Referee: Jamie Leahy

15 October 2016
15:00

Ampthill	17 – 31	Blackheath (BP)

Dillingham Park
Attendance: 512
Referee: Gareth Holsgrove

15 October 2016
15:00

(BP) Cambridge	26 – 20	Macclesfield (BP)

Grantchester Road
Attendance: 410
Referee: Phillip Davies

15 October 2016
15:00

(BP) Coventry	53 – 24	Fylde

Butts Park Arena
Attendance: 975
Referee: Hamish Smales

15 October 2016
15:00

Hull Ionians	32 – 29	Esher (2BP)

Brantingham Park
Attendance: 221
Referee: Adam Leal

15 October 2016
15:00

(BP) Old Albanian	26 – 35	Loughborough Students (BP)

Woollam Playing Fields
Attendance: 342
Referee: Karl Dickson

15 October 2016
15:00

(BP) Plymouth Albion	39 – 3	Darlington Mowden Park

Brickfields
Attendance: 759
Referee: James Clarke

15 October 2016
15:00

(BP) Rosslyn Park	24 – 31	Birmingham Moseley (BP)

The Rock
Attendance: 572
Referee: James Sullivan

=== Round 8 ===
22 October 2016
14:00

(BP) Loughborough Students	29 – 14	Darlington Mowden Park

Loughborough University Stadium
Attendance: 207
Referee: James Leahy

22 October 2016
14:30

(BP) Hartpury College	49 – 14	Ampthill

College Stadium
Attendance: 291
Referee: Matthew O'Grady

22 October 2016
15:00

(BP) Birmingham Moseley	56 – 33	Old Albanian (BP)

Billesley Common
Attendance: 864
Referee: Neil Chivers

22 October 2016
15:00

(BP) Blackheath	34 – 24	Cambridge (BP)

Well Hall
Attendance: 869
Referee: Shane Lewis

22 October 2016
15:00

Coventry	34 – 33	Plymouth Albion (2BP)

Butts Park Arena
Attendance: 1,175
Referee: Llyr ApGeraint-Roberts

22 October 2016
15:00

(BP) Esher	71 – 24	Blaydon (BP)

Molesey Road
Attendance: 520
Referee: Thomas Davis

22 October 2016
15:00

(BP) Fylde	38 – 17	Hull Ionians

Woodlands Memorial Ground
Attendance: 565
Referee: Greg Macdonald

22 October 2016
15:00

Macclesfield	18 – 36	Rosslyn Park (BP)

Priory Park
Attendance: 321
Referee: Steve lee

=== Round 9 ===
29 October 2016
14:30

(BP) Blaydon	30 – 24	Fylde (2BP)

Crow Trees
Attendance: 180
Referee: Neil Chivers

29 October 2016
15:00

(BP) Ampthill	29 – 24	Esher (BP)

Dillingham Park
Attendance: 318
Referee: Llyr ApGeraint Roberts

29 October 2016
15:00

(BP) Cambridge	32 – 54	Hartpury College (BP)

Grantchester Road
Attendance: 430
Referee: Veryan Boscawen

29 October 2016
15:00

Darlington Mowden Park	7 – 15	Birmingham Moseley

Northern Echo Arena
Attendance: 1,079
Referee: Matt Turvey

29 October 2016
15:00

Hull Ionians	21 – 40	Coventry (BP)

Brantingham Park
Attendance: 312
Referee: Thomas Davis

29 October 2016
15:00

(BP) Old Albanian	49 – 15	Macclesfield

Woollam Playing Fields
Attendance: 320
Referee: Darren Gamage

29 October 2016
15:00

(BP) Plymouth Albion	53 – 15	Loughborough Students

Brickfields
Attendance: 1,042
Referee: Daniel Parrott

29 October 2016
15:00

Rosslyn Park	28 – 3	Blackheath

The Rock
Attendance: 860
Referee: Phillip Davies

=== Round 10 ===
5 November 2016
14:00

(BP) Hull Ionians	18 – 24	Plymouth Albion

Brantingham Park
Attendance: 228
Referee: Matt Turvey

5 November 2016
14:30

(BP) Hartpury College	37 – 27	Rosslyn Park

College Stadium
Attendance: 300
Referee: Adam Leal

5 November 2016
15:00

(BP) Birmingham Moseley	47 – 19	Loughborough Students

Billesley Common
Attendance: 751
Referee: Ben Blain

5 November 2016
15:00

Blackheath	13 – 7	Old Albanian (BP)

Well Hall
Attendance: 641
Referee: James Philip Clarke

5 November 2016
15:00

Coventry	19 – 17	Blaydon (BP)

Butts Park Arena
Attendance: 994
Referee: Daniel Parrott

5 November 2016
15:00

(BP) Esher	40 – 32	Cambridge (BP)

Molesey Road
Attendance: 468
Referee: Angus Gardner

5 November 2016
15:00

Fylde	13 – 11	Ampthill (BP)

Woodlands Memorial Ground
Attendance: 585
Referee: Hamish Smales

5 November 2016
15:00

(BP) Macclesfield	43 – 16	Darlington Mowden Park

Priory Park
Attendance: 342
Referee: Anthony Woodthorpe

=== Round 11 ===
11 November 2016
19:45

(BP) Rosslyn Park	33 – 0	Esher

The Rock
Attendance: 1,347
Referee: Phillip Davies

12 November 2016
14:00

(BP) Blaydon	66 – 14	Hull Ionians

Crow Trees
Attendance: 213
Referee: Jamie Leahy

12 November 2016
14:00

(BP) Cambridge	36 – 0	Fylde

Grantchester Road
Attendance: 380
Referee: James Phillip Clarke

12 November 2016
14:00

(BP) Loughborough Students	76 – 30	Macclesfield (BP)

Loughborough University Stadium
Attendance: 127
Referee: Dean Richards

12 November 2016
14:15

Ampthill	22 – 8	Coventry

Dillingham Park
Attendance: 358
Referee: Veryan Boscawen

12 November 2016
15:00

Darlington Mowden Park	5 – 31	Blackheath (BP)

Northern Echo Arena
Attendance: 670
Referee: Christoper Karl Walker

12 November 2016
15:00

Old Albanian	0 – 32	Hartpury College (BP)

Woollam Playing Fields
Attendance: 225
Referee: Gareth Holsgrove

* Hartpury is the first team (in the top three divisions) to win a bonus point in eleven consecutive matches.

12 November 2016
15:00

(BP) Plymouth Albion	27 – 20	Birmingham Moseley (BP)

Brickfields
Attendance: 1,162
Referee: Karl Dickson

=== Round 12 ===
19 November 2016
14:00

Hull Ionians	13 – 49	Ampthill (BP)

Brantingham Park
Attendance: 226
Referee: Philip Clarke

19 November 2016
14:30

(BP) Hartpury College	74 – 0	Darlington Mowden Park

College Stadium
Attendance: 150
Referee: Thomas Davis

19 November 2016
15:00

(BP) Blackheath	26 – 32	Loughborough Students

Well Hall
Attendance: 551
Referee: Veryan Boscawem

19 November 2016
15:00

Blaydon	17 – 38	Plymouth Albion (BP)

Crow Trees
Attendance: 178
Referee: Hamish Smales

19 November 2016
15:00

(BP) Coventry	55 – 12	Cambridge

Butts Park Arena
Attendance: 1,187
Referee: Neil Chivers

19 November 2016
15:00

(BP) Esher	34 – 43	Old Albanian (BP)

Molesey Road
Attendance: 355
Referee: Adam Leal

19 November 2016
15:00

(BP) Fylde	34 – 45	Rosslyn Park (BP)

Woodlands Memorial Ground
Attendance: 517
Referee: Ben Blain

19 November 2016
15:00

(BP) Macclesfield	15 – 17	Birmingham Moseley

Priory Park
Attendance: 398
Referee: Gareth Holsgrave

=== Round 13 ===
26 November 2016
14:00

(BP) Cambridge	57 – 31	Hull Ionians (BP)

Grantchester Road
Attendance: 433
Referee: Shane Lewis

26 November 2016
14:00

Loughborough Students	25 – 47	Hartpury College (BP)

Loughborough University Stadium
Attendance: 423
Referee: Llyr ApGeraint Roberts

26 November 2016
14:15

(BP) Ampthill	50 – 14	Blaydon

Dillingham Park
Attendance: 346
Referee: Jamie Leahy

26 November 2016
15:00

Birmingham Moseley	22 – 12	Blackheath

Billesley Common
Attendance: 776
Referee: Adam Leal

26 November 2016
15:00

(BP) Darlington Mowden Park	48 – 31	Esher

Northern Echo Arena
Attendance: 625
Referee: Ben Blain

26 November 2016
15:00

(BP) Old Albanian	32 – 17	Fylde

Woollam Playing Fields
Attendance: 331
Referee: Thomas Davies

26 November 2016
15:00

(BP) Plymouth Albion	33 – 10	Macclesfield

Brickfields
Attendance: 828
Referee: Veryan Boscawen

26 November 2016
15:00

(BP) Rosslyn Park	33 – 15	Coventry

The Rock
Attendance: 578
Referee: Gareth Holsgrove

=== Round 14 ===
3 December 2016
14:00

(BP) Blaydon	14 – 17	Cambridge

Crow Trees
Attendance: 220
Referee: Matt Turvey

3 December 2016
14:00

Hull Ionians	16 – 14	Rosslyn Park (BP)

Brantingham Park
Attendance: 156
Referee: Neil Chivers

3 December 2016
14:15

Ampthill	24 – 22	Plymouth Albion (BP)

Dillingham Park
Attendance: 322
Referee: Jack Lewars

3 December 2016
14:30

(BP) Hartpury College	64 – 5	Birmingham Moseley

College Stadium
Attendance: 505
Referee: Veryan Boscawen

3 December 2016
15:00

(BP) Blackheath	55 – 10	Macclesfield

Well Hall
Attendance: 431
Referee: Phillip Davies

3 December 2016
15:00

(BP) Coventry	43 – 42	Old Albanian (2BP)

Butts Park Arena
Attendance: 939
Referee: Calum Howard

3 December 2016
15:00

(BP) Esher	34 – 22	Loughborough Students

Molesey Road
Attendance: 438
Referee: Shane Lewis

3 December 2016
15:00

(BP) Fylde	31 – 25	Darlington Mowden Park (BP)

Woodlands Memorial Ground
Attendance: 521
Referee: Llyr ApGeraint-Roberts

=== Round 15 ===
10 December 2016
14:00

Cambridge	10 – 20	Ampthill

Grantchester Road
Attendance: 480
Referee: Thomas Davis

10 December 2016
14:00

(BP) Loughborough Students	46 – 17	Fylde

Loughborough University Stadium
Attendance: 217
Referee: James Clarke

10 December 2016
15:00

Birmingham Moseley	24 – 6	Esher

Billesley Common
Attendance: 670
Referee: Neil Chivers

10 December 2016
15:00

Darlington Mowden Park	20 – 20	Coventry

Northern Echo Arena
Attendance: 948
Referee: Jamie Leahy

10 December 2016
15:00

Macclesfield	12 – 62	Hartpury College (BP)

Priory Park
Attendance: 382
Referee: Matt Turvey

10 December 2016
15:00

Old Albanian	15 – 13	Hull Ionians (BP)

Woollam Playing Fields
Attendance: 307
Referee: Mike Hudson

10 December 2016
15:00

Plymouth Albion	20 – 5	Blackheath

Brickfields
Attendance: 926
Referee: Simon Harding

10 December 2016
15:00

(BP) Rosslyn Park	51 – 14	Blaydon

The Rock
Attendance: 650
Referee: Anthony Woodthorpe

=== Round 16 ===
17 December 2016
14:00

(BP) Ampthill	43 – 19	Old Albanian

Dillingham Park
Attendance: 460
Referee: Anthony Woodthorpe

17 December 2016
14:00

(BP) Blaydon	17 – 24	Darlington Mowden Park

Crow Trees
Attendance: 620
Referee: Veryan Boscawen

17 December 2016
14:00

Cambridge	14 – 32	Rosslyn Park (BP)

Grantchester Road
Attendance: 400
Referee: Michael Hudson

17 December 2016
14:00

Hull Ionians	18 – 16	Loughborough Students (BP)

Brantingham Park
Attendance: 355
Referee: Matthew O'Grady

17 December 2016
15:00

Coventry	26 – 23	Birmingham Moseley (BP)

Butts Park Arena
Attendance: 2,712
Referee: James Clarke

17 December 2016
15:00

Esher	11 – 30	Blackheath (BP)

Molesey Road
Attendance: 650
Referee: Calum Howard

17 December 2016
15:00

Fylde	21 – 12	Macclesfield

Woodlands Memorial Park
Attendance: 710
Referee: James Leahy

17 December 2016
15:00

(2BP) Plymouth Albion	24 – 27	Hartpury College

Brickfields
Attendance: 1,222
Referee: Gareth Holsgrove

- Hartpury failed to gain a bonus point for the first time this season.

=== Round 17 ===
7 January 2017
14:00

(BP) Loughborough Students	52 – 34	Blaydon (BP)

Loughborough University Stadium
Attendance: 113
Referee: Simon Harding

7 January 2017
14:30

(BP) Hartpury College	66 – 24	Esher (BP)

College Stadium
Attendance: 327
Referee: Michael Hudson

7 January 2017
15:00

(BP) Birmingham Moseley	38 – 19	Hull Ionians

Billesley Common
Attendance: 796
Referee: Ben Blain

7 January 2017
15:00

(BP) Blackheath	47 – 14	Fylde

Well Hall
Attendance: 552
Referee: Gareth Holsgrove

7 January 2017
15:00

Darlington Mowden Park	14 – 12	Ampthill (BP)

Northern Echo Arena
Attendance: 777
Referee: Neil Chivers

7 January 2017
15:00

Macclesfield	14 – 37	Coventry (BP)

Priory Park
Attendance: 434
Referee: Llyr Apgeraint Roberts

7 January 2017
15:00

Old Albanian	26 – 24	Cambridge (2BP)

Woollam Playing Fields
Attendance: 419
Referee: Calum Howard

7 January 2017
15:00

Rosslyn Park	17 – 10	Plymouth Albion (BP)

The Rock
Attendance: 940
Referee: Veryan Boscawen

=== Round 18 ===
14 January 2017
14:00

Blaydon	P – P	Birmingham Moseley

Crow Trees

14 January 2017
14:00

(2BP) Cambridge	20 – 25	Darlington Mowden Park (BP)

Grantchester Road
Attendance: 380
Referee: Veryan Boscawen

14 January 2017
14:00

Hull Ionians	P – P	Macclesfield

Brantingham Park

14 January 2017
14:15

(BP) Ampthill	25 – 3	Loughborough Students

Dillingham Park
Attendance: 303
Referee: Matthew O'Grady

14 January 2017
15:00

(BP) Coventry	39 – 3	Blackheath

Butts Park Arena
Attendance: 1,178
Referee: Jamie Leahy

14 January 2017
15:00

(BP) Fylde	31 – 57	Hartpury College (BP)

Woodlands Memorial Ground
Attendance: 765
Referee: Matt Turvey

14 January 2017
15:00

(BP) Plymouth Albion	29 – 7	Esher

Brickfields
Attendance: 1,107
Referee: Shane Lewis

14 January 2017
15:00

(BP) Rosslyn Park	35 – 17	Old Albanian

The Rock
Attendance: 150
Referee: Phillip Davies

=== Round 19 ===
21 January 2017
14:00

(BP) Loughborough Students	42 – 27	Cambridge (BP)

Loughborough University Stadium
Attendance: 214
Referee: Tim Wigglesworth

21 January 2017
14:30

(BP) Hartpury College	50 – 19	Coventry

College Stadium
Attendance: 677
Referee: Dean Richards

21 January 2017
15:00

Birmingham Moseley	18 – 35	Ampthill (BP)

Billesley Common
Attendance: 864
Referee: Jamie Leahy

21 January 2017
15:00

(BP) Blackheath	31 – 29	Hull Ionians (2BP)

Well Hall
Attendance: 712
Referee: Thomas Davis

21 January 2017
15:00

(BP) Darlington Mowden Park	19 – 20	Rosslyn Park

Northern Echo Arena
Attendance: 1,085
Referee: Llyr ApGeraint-Roberts

21 January 2017
15:00

(BP) Esher	42 – 29	Fylde (BP)

Molesey Road
Attendance: 752
Referee: Adam Leal

21 January 2017
15:00

Macclesfield	7 – 15	Blaydon

Priory Park
Attendance: 323
Referee: James Clarke

21 January 2017
15:00

(BP) Old Albanian	13 – 18	Plymouth Albion

Woollam Playing Fields
Attendance: 270
Referee: Anthony Woodthorpe

=== Round 20 ===
28 January 2017
14:00

(BP) Blaydon	28 – 11	Blackheath

Crow Trees
Attendance: 306
Referee: Ben Blain

28 January 2017
14:00

(BP) Cambridge	30 – 39	Birmingham Moseley (BP)

Grantchester Road
Attendance: 420
Referee: Philip Davies

28 January 2017
14:00

Hull Ionians	7 – 49	Hartpury College (BP)

Brantingham Park
Attendance: 172
Referee: Jamie Leahy

28 January 2017
14:15

(BP) Ampthill	36 – 10	Macclesfield

Dillingham Park
Attendance: 323
Referee: Thomas Davis

28 January 2017
15:00

(BP) Coventry	35 – 27	Esher (BP)

Butts Park Arena
Attendance: 1,397
Referee: Finlay Brown

28 January 2017
15:00

(2BP) Old Albanian	29 – 35	Darlington Mowden Park (BP)

Woollam Playing Fields
Attendance: 327
Referee: Matthew O'Grady

28 January 2017
15:00

(BP) Plymouth Albion	29 – 21	Fylde

Brickfields
Attendance: 1,067
Referee: Calum Howard

28 January 2017
15:00

(BP) Rosslyn Park	39 – 37	Loughborough Students (2BP)

The Rock
Attendance: 510
Referee: Angus Gardner

=== Round 21 ===
4 February 2017
14:00

(2BP) Loughborough Students	39 – 46	Old Albanian (BP)

Loughborough University Stadium
Attendance: 113
Referee: James Philip Clarke

4 February 2017
14:30

(BP) Hartpury College	80 – 19	Blaydon

College Stadium
Attendance: 250
Referee: Shane Lewis

4 February 2017
15:00

(BP) Birmingham Moseley	36 – 20	Rosslyn Park

Billesley Common
Attendance: 656
Referee: Veryan Boscawen

4 February 2017
15:00

(BP) Blackheath	17 – 24	Ampthill

Well Hall
Attendance: 404
Referee: Phil Davies

4 February 2017
15:00

(BP) Darlington Mowden Park	17 – 20	Plymouth Albion

Northern Echo Arena
Attendance: 888
Referee: Jamie Leahy

4 February 2017
15:00

(BP) Esher	47 – 19	Hull Ionians

Molesey Road
Attendance: 380
Referee: Michael Hudson

4 February 2017
15:00

(BP) Fylde	33 – 24	Coventry (BP)

Woodlands Memorial Ground
Attendance: 585
Referee: Llyr Apgeriant-Roberts

4 February 2017
15:00

(BP) Macclesfield	24 – 36	Cambridge (BP)

Priory Park
Attendance: 347
Referee: Matt Turvey

=== Round 22 ===
11 February 2017
14:00

Blaydon	17 – 7	Esher

Crow Trees
Attendance: 120
Referee: Jamie Leahy

11 February 2017
14:00

Cambridge	23 – 23	Blackheath

Grantchester Road
Attendance: 592
Referee: Thomas Davis

11 February 2017
14:00

(2 BP) Hull Ionians	29 – 31	Fylde (BP)

Brantingham Park
Attendance: 167
Referee: Matt Turvey

11 February 2017
14:15

(BP) Ampthill	25 – 51	Hartpury College (BP)

Dillingham Park
Attendance: 374
Referee: Veryan Boscawen

11 February 2017
15:00

(BP) Darlington Mowden Park	27 – 13	Loughborough Students

Northern Echo Arena
Attendance: 622
Referee: Ben Blaine

11 February 2017
15:00

Old Albanian	7 – 33	Birmingham Moseley (BP)

Woollam Playing Fields
Attendance: 329
Referee: Fergus Kirby

11 February 2017
15:00

(BP) Plymouth Albion	33 – 24	Coventry

Brickfields
Attendance: 889
Referee: Daniel Parrott

11 February 2017
15:00

(BP) Rosslyn Park	59 – 28	Macclesfield (BP)

The Rock
Attendance: 325
Referee: Anthony Woodthorpe

=== Round 23 ===
18 February 2017
14:00

(BP) Loughborough Students	18 – 20	Plymouth Albion

Loughborough University Stadium
Attendance: 207
Referee: Sara Cox

18 February 2017
14:30

(BP) Hartpury College	45 – 36	Cambridge (BP)

College Stadium
Attendance: 324
Referee: Michael Hudson

18 February 2017
15:00

(BP) Birmingham Moseley	19 – 21	Darlington Mowden Park

Billesley Common
Attendance: 678
Referee: Anthony Woodthorpe

18 February 2017
15:00

Blackheath	15 – 36	Rosslyn Park (BP)

Well Hall
Attendance: 1,187
Referee: Gareth Holsgrove

18 February 2017
15:00

(BP) Coventry	50 – 38	Hull Ionians (BP)

Butts Park Arena
Attendance: 1,286
Referee: Adam Leal

18 February 2017
15:00

Esher	15 – 46	Ampthill (BP)

Molesey Road
Attendance: 434
Referee: James Clarke

18 February 2017
15:00

(BP) Fylde	26 – 17	Blaydon

Woodlands Memorial Park
Attendance: 635
Referee: Neil Chivers

18 February 2017
15:00

Macclesfield	19 – 50	Old Albanian (BP)

Priory Park
Attendance: 296
Referee: Mick Harris

=== Rescheduled matches (from 14 January) ===
25 February 2017
14:00

(BP) Blaydon	25 – 12	Birmingham Moseley

Crow Trees
Attendance: 210
Referee: Calum Howard

25 February 2017
14:00

(BP) Hull Ionians	45 – 21	Macclesfield

Brantingham Park
Attendance: 151
Referee: John Meredith

=== Round 24 ===
4 March 2017
14:00

Loughborough Students	20 – 29	Birmingham Moseley (BP)

Loughborough University Stadium
Attendance: 250
Referee: Daniel Collins

4 March 2017
14:00

(BP) Old Albanian	36 – 10	Blackheath

Woollam Playing Fields
Attendance: 340
Referee: Phillip Davies

4 March 2017
14:30

(BP) Blaydon	19 – 25	Coventry

Crow Trees
Attendance: 305
Referee: Ben Plain

4 March 2017
15:00

(BP) Ampthill	43 – 24	Fylde (BP)

Dillingham Park
Attendance: 482
Referee: Neil Chivers

4 March 2017
15:00

Cambridge	22 – 36	Esher (BP)

Grantchester Road
Attendance: 620
Referee: Anthony Woodthorpe

4 March 2017
15:00

(BP) Darlington Mowden Park	48 – 12	Macclesfield

Northern Echo Arena
Attendance: 711
Referee: Hamish Smales

4 March 2017
15:00

(BP) Plymouth Albion	26 – 7	Hull Ionians

Brickfields
Attendance: 1,169
Referee: Fergus Kirby

4 March 2017
15:00

Rosslyn Park	28 – 36	Hartpury College

The Rock
Attendance: 320
Referee: Matt Turvey

=== Round 25 ===
10 March 2017
19:45

(BP) Esher	18 – 24	Rosslyn Park

Molesey Road
Attendance: 1,400
Referee: Veryan Boscawen

11 March 2017
14:00

(BP) Birmingham Moseley	26 – 47	Plymouth Albion (BP)

Billesley Common
Attendance: 720
Referee: Neil Chivers

11 March 2017
14:00

(BP) Blackheath	26 – 21	Darlington Mowden Park (BP)

Well Hall
Attendance: 401
Referee: Matthew Grady

11 March 2017
14:00

(BP) Hartpury College	57 – 21	Old Albanian

College Stadium
Attendance: 486
Referee: Daniel Collins

- With victory Hartpury College are champions.

11 March 2017
14:00

(BP) Macclesfield	42 – 38	Loughborough Students (2BP)

Priory Park
Attendance: 198
Referee: Alexander Thomas

11 March 2017
14:15

(BP) Coventry	29 – 19	Ampthill

Butts Park Arena
Attendance: 1,057
Referee: James Clarke

11 March 2017
15:00

(BP) Fylde	28 – 46	Cambridge (BP)

Woodlands Memorial Ground
Attendance: 525
Referee: John Meredith

11 March 2017
15:00

Hull Ionians	17 – 17	Blaydon

Brantingham Park
Attendance: 164
Referee: Llyr ApGeraint Roberts

=== Round 26 ===
25 March 2017
14:00

(BP) Loughborough Students	35 – 32	Blackheath (2BP)

Loughborough University Stadium
Attendance: 412
Referee: Matt Turvey

25 March 2017
15:00

(BP) Ampthill	31 – 11	Hull Ionians

Dillingham Park
Attendance: 331
Referee: Gareth Holsgrove

25 March 2017
15:00

(BP) Birmingham Moseley	28 – 24	Macclesfield (2BP)

Billesley Common
Attendance: 885
Referee: Jamie Leahy

25 March 2017
15:00

(BP) Cambridge	27 – 36	Coventry (BP)

Grantchester Road
Attendance: 650
Referee: Veryan Boscawen

25 March 2017
15:00

(BP) Darlington Mowden Park	26 – 34	Hartpury College (BP)

Northern Echo Arena
Attendance: 844
Referee: Ben Blain

25 March 2017
15:00

Old Albanian	19 – 65	Esher (BP)

Woollam Playing Fields
Attendance: 310
Referee: Simon Harding

25 March 2017
15:00

(BP) Plymouth Albion	45 – 0	Blaydon

Brickfields
Attendance: 1,821
Referee: Ian Bibey

25 March 2017
15:00

(BP) Rosslyn Park	36 – 19	Fylde

The Rock
Attendance: 730
Referee: Daniel Parrott

=== Round 27 ===
1 April 2017
14:30

Blaydon	17 – 40	Ampthill (BP)

Crow Trees
Attendance: 179
Referee: Veryan Boscawen

1 April 2017
14:30

(BP) Hartpury College	40 – 31	Loughborough Students (BP)

College Stadium
Attendance: 803
Referee: Adam Leal

1 April 2017
15:00

(BP) Blackheath	25 – 32	Birmingham Moseley (BP)

Well Hall
Attendance: 1,015
Referee: Daniel Collins

1 April 2017
15:00

(BP) Coventry	36 – 27	Rosslyn Park

Butts Park Arena
Attendance: 1,266
Referee: Anthony Woodhope

1 April 2017
15:00

(BP) Esher	50 – 33	Darlington Mowden Park (BP)

Molesey Road
Attendance: 330
Referee: Calum Howard

1 April 2017
15:00

(BP) Fylde	17 – 21	Old Albanian

Woodlands Memorial Ground
Attendance: 675
Referee: Jamie Leahy

1 April 2017
15:00

(BP) Hull Ionians	31 – 26	Cambridge (2BP)

Brantingham Park
Attendance: 255
Referee: Neil Chivers

1 April 2017
15:00

(BP) Macclesfield	18 – 21	Plymouth Albion

Priory Park
Attendance: 268
Referee: Ben Blain

- Macclesfield are relegated.

=== Round 28 ===
8 April 2017
14:00

(2BP) Loughborough Students	37 – 38	Esher

Loughborough University Stadium
Attendance: 213
Referee: Andrew MacNeaney

8 April 2017
15:00

Birmingham Moseley	14 – 32	Hartpury College (BP)

Billesley Common
Attendance: 927
Referee: Ben Blain

8 April 2017
15:00

(2BP) Cambridge	40 – 43	Blaydon (BP)

Grantchester Road
Attendance: 585
Referee: Llyr Apgeraint-Roberts

8 April 2017
15:00

(BP) Darlington Mowden Park	66 – 22	Fylde

Northern Echo Arena
Attendance: 823
Referee: Matt Turvey

8 April 2017
15:00

Macclesfield	24 – 12	Blackheath

Priory Park
Attendance: 302
Referee: Jonathan Cook

8 April 2017
15:00

Old Albanian	8 – 73	Coventry (BP)

Woollam Playing Fields
Attendance: 350
Referee: Neil Chivers

8 April 2017
15:00

Plymouth Albion	19 – 14	Ampthill (BP)

Brickfields
Attendance: 1,638
Referee: Calum Howard

8 April 2017
15:00

(2BP) Rosslyn Park	29 – 30	Hull Ionians

The Rock
Attendance: 448
Referee: Karl Dickson

=== Round 29 ===
22 April 2017
14:30

(BP) Blaydon	40 – 24	Rosslyn Park (BP)

Crow Trees
Attendance: 302
Referee: Ben Blain

22 April 2017
14:30

(BP) Hartpury College	92 – 7	Macclesfield

College Stadium
Attendance: 473
Referee: Neil Chivers

22 April 2017
15:00

(BP) Ampthill	35 – 12	Cambridge

Dillingham Park
Attendance: 823
Referee: Benjamin Davies

22 April 2017
15:00

Blackheath	7 – 48	Plymouth Albion (BP)

Well Hall
Attendance: 1,097
Referee: Gareth Holsgrove

22 April 2017
15:00

(BP) Coventry	36 – 16	Darlington Mowden Park

Butts Park Arena
Attendance: 1,770
Referee: Karl Dickson

22 April 2017
15:00

(BP) Esher	35 – 24	Birmingham Moseley

Moseley Park
Attendance: 1,358
Referee: Luis Caviglia

22 April 2017
15:00

(BP) Fylde	32 – 21	Loughborough Students

Woodlands Memorial Park
Attendance: 735
Referee: Alexander Thomas

15 April 2017
15:00

(BP) Hull Ionians	46 – 33	Old Albanian (BP)

Brantingham Park
Attendance: 355
Referee: Llyr ApGeraint-Roberts

=== Round 30 ===
29 April 2017
14:30

(BP) Old Albanian	29 – 24	Blaydon (BP)

Woollam Playing Fields
Attendance: 329
Referee: Veryan Boscawen

- Blaydon are relegated.

29 April 2017
15:00

(BP) Birmingham Moseley	57 – 0	Fylde

Billesley Common
Attendance: 848
Referee: Jamie Leahy

29 April 2017
15:00

Blackheath	22 – 43	Hartpury College (BP)

Well Hall
Attendance: 954
Referee: Calum Howard

29 April 2017
15:00

Cambridge	15 – 40	Plymouth Albion (BP)

Grantchester Road
Attendance: 750
Referee: Robert Bourke

29 April 2017
15:00

(BP) Darlington Mowden Park	26 – 41	Hull Ionians (BP)

Northern Echo Arena
Attendance: 1,407
Referee: Gareth Holsgrove

29 April 2017
15:00

(BP) Loughborough Students	22 – 27	Coventry (BP)

Loughborough University Stadium
Attendance: 450
Referee: James Clarke

29 April 2017
15:00

Macclesfield	12 – 24	Esher (BP)

Priory Park
Attendance: 478
Referee: Matt Turvey

29 April 2017
15:00

(BP) Rosslyn Park	21 – 27	Ampthill (BP)

The Rock
Attendance: 963
Referee: Daniel Collins

== Attendances ==
Club	Home Games	Total	Average	Highest	Lowest	% Capacity
Ampthill	15	6,221	415	823	303	14%
Birmingham Moseley	15	12,450	830	1,232	656	17%
Blackheath	15	11,075	738	1,187	401	45%
Blaydon	15	3,748	250	620	120	12%
Cambridge	15	7,320	488	750	380	22%
Coventry	15	18,963	1,264	2,712	939	32%
Darlington Mowden Park	15	13,270	885	1,407	622	4%
Esher	15	9,090	606	1,400	330	17%
Fylde	15	9,240	616	765	517	8%
Hartpury College	15	5,838	389	803	150	19%
Hull Ionians	15	3,450	230	355	151	15%
Loughborough Students	15	4,070	271	543	113	9%
Old Albanian	15	4,874	325	419	225	32%
Macclesfield	15	5,104	340	478	198	27%
Plymouth Albion	15	16,085	1,072	1,821	688	13%
Rosslyn Park	15	9,897	660	1,347	150	33%

== Individual statistics ==
=== Top points scorers ===
Rank	Player	Team	Points
1	(Scotland) Harry Leonard	Rosslyn Park	265
2	(England) Will Maisey	Coventry	245
3	(Ireland) James (Matt) Williams	Birmingham Moseley	242
4	(England) Jacob Perry	Hartpury College	231
5	(England) Joseph Tarrant	Ampthill	200
6	(England) Leo Fielding	Blackheath	194
7	(England) Greg Smith	Fylde	193

=== Top try scorers ===
Rank	Player	Team	Tries
1	(Lithuania) Jonas Mikalcius	Hartpury College	36
2	(England) Sam Baker	Ampthill	21
3	(England) Ed Sheldon	Birmingham-Moseley	19
3	(England) Luke Eves	Hartpury College	19
5	(Scotland) Gair Currie	Loughborough Students	16
5	(Italy) Jake Polledri	Hartpury College	16
5	(England) Adam Radwan	Darlington Mowden Park	16
5	(England) Robin Wedlake-Millecham	Plymouth Albion	16

- Jonas Mikalcius scored two tries on 10 December (attributed to Jonas) against Macclesfield but they have not been added to the published tables (officially 34 tries)

- Updated to matches played on 29 April 2017

== Season records ==
- Updated to matches played on 29 April 2017

=== Team ===
Largest home win — 85 pts

92 – 7 Hartpury College at home to Macclesfield on 22 April 2017

Largest away win — 65 pts

8 – 73 Coventry away to Old Albanian on 8 April 2017

Most points scored — 92 pts

92 – 7 Hartpury College at home to Macclesfield on 22 April 2017

Most points scored away from home — 73 pts

8 – 73 Coventry away to Old Albanian on 8 April 2017

Most tries in a match — 15

92 – 7 Hartpury College at home to Macclesfield on 22 April 2017

Most conversions in a match — 12

Hartpury College at home to Macclesfield on 22 April 2017

Most penalties in a match — 6

Plymouth Albion at Fylde on 8 October 2016

Most drop goals in a match — 1 (6)

Hull Ionians at home to Darlington Mowden Park on 3 September 2016
Cambridge away to Plymouth Albion, both on 3 September 2016
Cambridge away to Rosslyn Park on 10 September 2016
Blaydon away to Birmingham Moseley on 24 September 2016
Rosslyn Park away to Loughborough Students on 8 October 2016
Blaydon at home to Hull Ionians on 12 November 2016

=== Attendances ===
Highest — 2,712

Coventry at home to Birmingham Moseley on 17 December 2016

Lowest — 113 (2)

Loughborough Students v Blaydon (7 January 2017)
Loughborough Students v Old Albanian (4 February 2017)

Highest average attendance — 1,264

Coventry

Lowest average attendance — 230

Hull Ionians

=== Player ===
Most points in a match — 29 (2)

Protheroe for Hartpury College at Cambridge on 28 October 2016
Law for Darlington Mowden Park at home to Fylde on 8 April 2017

Most tries in a match — 3 (25)

Gair Currie for Loughborough Students away to Cambridge on 1 October 2016
Dan George for Blackheath at home to Blaydon on 8 August 2016
Luke Eves for Harpury College at home to Hull Ionians on 8 October 2016
Ed Sheldon for Birmingham Moseley at home to Old Albanian on 22 October 2016
Joe Brown for Esher at home to Blaydon on 22 October 2016
Scott Armstrong for Fylde at home to Hull Ionians on 22 October 2016
Jonas Mikacius for Hartpury College at home to Ampthill on 22 October 2016
Jonas Mikacius for Hartpury College at home to Rosslyn Park on 5 November 2016
Matt Thompson for Blaydon at home to Hull Ionians on 12 November 2016
Caven for Hartpury College at home to Darlingham Mowden Park on 19 November 2016
Ali Thomson for Hull Ionians away to Cambridge on 26 November 2016
Dan Williams for Plymouth Albion home to Hartpury College on 17 December 2016
Matt Thompson for Blaydon at home to Blackheath on 28 January 2017
Andy Radwan for Darlington Mowden Park at Old Albanian on 28 January 2017
Liebeneberg for Cambridge at Macclesfield on 4 February 2017
Peter White for Coventry at home to Hull Ionians on 18 February 2017
Chris Briers for Fylde at Ampthill on 4 March 2017
Andy Radwan for Darlington Mowden Park home to Macclesfield on 4 March 2017
Protheroe for Hartpury College home to Old Albanian on 11 March 2017
Nigel Baker for Ampthill away to Blaydon on 1 April 2017
Garry Law for Darlington Mowden Park at home to Fylde on 8 April 2017
Max Trimble for Coventry at Old Albanian on 8 April 2017
Jonas Mikacius for Hartpury College at home to Macclesfield on 22 April 2017
Callum Irvine for Hull Ionians at home to Old Albanian on 22 April 2017
Jonas Mikacius for Hartpury College away to Blackheath on 29 April 2017

Most conversions in a match — 11

Adam Hastings for Hartpury College at home to Macclesfield on 22 April 2017

Most penalties in a match — 6

Kieran Hallett for Plymouth Albion away to Fylde on 8 October 2016

Most drop goals in a match — 1 (7)

Lee Millar for Hull Ionians at home to Darlington Mowden Park on 3 September 2016
Jack Green for Cambridge away to Plymouth Albion on 3 September 2016
Dan Lewis for Cambridge at Rosslyn Park on 10 September 2016
Nathan Horsfall for Blaydon at Birmingham Moseley on 24 September 2016
Scott Sneddon for Rosslyn Park away to Loughborough Students on 8 October 2016
Ryan Foreman for Blaydon at home to Hull Ionians on 12 November 2016
Callum Irvine for Hull Ionians at home to Cambridge on 1 April 2017

== See also ==
- English rugby union system
- Rugby union in England
