= Ross McCann =

Scottish rugby union player

- Born: 30 October 1997 (age 29) Edinburgh, Scotland
- Height: 1.81 m (5 ft 11 in)
- Weight: 91 kg (201 lb; 14 st 5 lb)

Rugby union career
- Position: Winger
Senior career
Years	Team	Apps	(Points)
2023–present	Edinburgh Rugby	2	(0)
International career
Years	Team	Apps	(Points)
2024–present	Scotland	1	(0)
2024–present	Scotland A	1	(0)
National sevens teams
Years	Team		Comps
2017–2022	Scotland 7s		
2021–2024	Great Britain		
- Correct as of 26 July 2021
Medal record
Men's rugby sevens
Representing Great Britain
European Games
Silver medal – second place	2023 Kraków–Małopolska	Team competition

Ross McCann (born 30 October 1997) is a Scotland international rugby union player who plays on the wing.

From a sporting family, he and his brothers Ali McCann, who is a footballer who plays for Preston North End F.C., and Lewis McCann who plays for Dunfermline F.C., are all from Edinburgh, born to an English mother and a Northern Irish father.

Ross McCann went to school in Cramond and then the Royal High School, Edinburgh. He played for the Royal High Corstorphine RFC and represented the under-20s for Scotland in the 2017 World Cup in Georgia where he played in every minute of the tournament helping Scotland to 5th Place, their best ever finish. McCann went on then to play for Stewart's Melville RFC and Melrose RFC. He signed a full-time contract to play in Scotland's sevens squad in 2018.

In March 2021 he was named in the Great Britain Rugby Sevens training squad ahead of the 2020 Summer Games. On 18 June 2021 McCann was confirmed in the official Britain squad to travel to Tokyo. He also represented Scotland at the Birmingham 2022 Commonwealth Games.

In October 2023 McCann made his debut for Edinburgh against Dragons RFC. He went on to sign a two-year contract with Edinburgh starting in summer 2024.

In January 2024 he was named in the Scotland squad for the Six Nations on 16 January 2024.

In June 2024 McCann was added to the Scotland squad for the summer tour to the Americas. He made his Scotland debut against Canada on 6 July 2024, coming on as a replacement.

Sporting positions
Preceded by Ben Robbins, Callum Hunter-Hill	John Macphail Scholarship; Patrick Kelly, Ross McCann; 2016	Succeeded by Angus Fraser, Andrew Jardine, Guy Kelly
