= George Turner (rugby union) =

Scotland international rugby union player

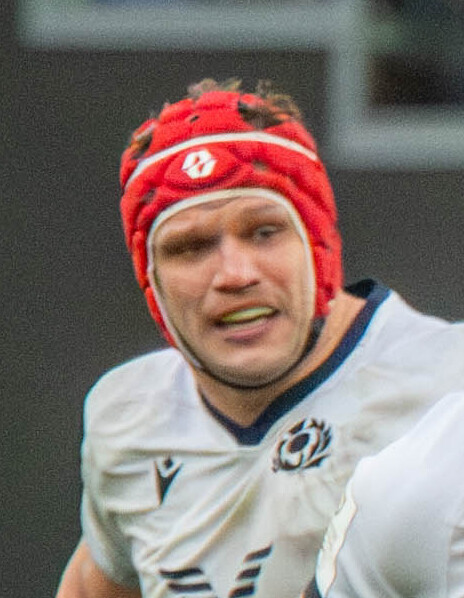
- Turner in March 2024
- Full name: George Edward Turner
- Born: 8 October 1992 (age 34) Edinburgh, Scotland
- Height: 1.80 m (5 ft 11 in)
- Weight: 106 kg (234 lb; 16 st 10 lb)
- School: Stewart's Melville College

Rugby union career
- Position: Hooker
- Current team: Harlequins
Senior career
Years	Team	Apps	(Points)
2013–2018	Edinburgh	12	(0)
2016–2017	→ London Scottish (loan)	6	(5)
2017–2018	→ Glasgow Warriors (loan)	18	(20)
2018–2024	Glasgow Warriors	71	(55)
2024–2025	Kobelco Kobe Steelers	13	(25)
2025–	Harlequins	5	(5)
- Correct as of 24 November 2025
International career
Years	Team	Apps	(Points)
2011–2012	Scotland U20	10	(0)
2017–	Scotland	50	(60)
- Correct as of 24 November 2025

George Edward Turner (born 8 October 1992) is a Scottish professional rugby union player who plays as a hooker for Prem Rugby club Harlequins, and for the Scotland national team.

== Club career ==
Turner was drafted to Currie in the Scottish Premiership for the 2017-18 season.

Turner was drafted to Ayr in the Scottish Premiership for the 2018-19 season.

Turner made his Edinburgh Rugby debut off the bench in October 2014.

On 27 July 2017 it was announced that Turner would be joining Glasgow Warriors on loan for the season 2017-18.

Turner played his first match for the Warriors on 25 August 2017 coming on as a substitute against Dragons in a 40-23 away win.

On 11 June 2024, after several seasons at Glasgow, Turner would depart the club to move to Japan to join Kobelco Kobe Steelers in the Japan Rugby League One competition for the 2024-25 season.

On 23 May 2025, Turner would return to the UK to sign for English club Harlequins in the Premiership Rugby from the 2025–26 season. In September 2025, he made his debut for the club as a replacement against Leicester Tigers in the Premiership Rugby Cup. In October 2025, he scored his first try for the club during a 52–14 victory in the league against Newcastle Red Bulls.

== International career ==
Turner received his first call up to the senior Scotland squad on 22 February 2016 for the 2016 Six Nations Championship. However he was replaced in the squad by Fraser Brown on 7 March 2016.

Turner made his international debut from the bench in November 2017 as Scotland opened their Autumn International series with a 44-38 victory over Samoa.

In June 2018 Turner was selected for Scotland's summer tour of the Americas, and achieved the unusual feat for a hooker of scoring a hat-trick in the victory over Canada. In 2023 Turner was selected in the 33 player squad for the 2023 Rugby World Cup in France.

In October 2025, he was selected for the 2025 Autumn Nations Series. In November 2025, he scored a try on his 50th cap during a 56–0 victory against Tonga.

=== International statistics ===
Appearances and tries by national team and year
National team	Year	Apps	Tries
Scotland	2017	2	0
Scotland	2018	3	4
Scotland	2019	4	1
Scotland	2020	3	1
Scotland	2021	8	1
Scotland	2022	10	1
Scotland	2023	10	2
Scotland	2024	5	0
Scotland	2025	5	2
Total		50	12

Sporting positions
Preceded by Finlay Gillies	John Macphail Scholarship; Grant Gilchrist, Harry Leonard, George Turner; 2011	Succeeded by Jonny Gray, Gregor Hunter
