= Lewis Niven =

Scottish rugby union player

- Born: Lewis Alexander Paul Niven; 3 May 1988 (age 38)
- Height: 1.85 m (6 ft 1 in)
- Weight: 111 kg (245 lb)
- School: Trinity Academy, Edinburgh

Rugby union career
- Position: Loosehead prop
- Current team: Edinburgh Rugby
Amateur team(s)
Years	Team	Apps	(Points)
- Trinity Academy
–	Edinburgh Accies		
Senior career
Years	Team	Apps	(Points)
2010–2014	Edinburgh	25	(0)
- Correct as of 3 June 2013
International career
Years	Team	Apps	(Points)
- Scotland 'A'
–	Scotland U21		
–	Scotland U19		
–	Scotland U18		

Lewis Alexander Paul Niven (born 3 May 1988) is a former Scottish rugby union player who played for Edinburgh Rugby in the Pro12.

== Background ==
He made his first start against Cardiff Blues at Murrayfield in the Heineken Cup in January 2011, and his first Magners League start on the visit to Scarlets the following month. The prop, who was part of the Scotland 'A' squad at the IRB Nations Cup in June 2010, has long been tipped for a career at the top and received the prestigious John Macphail scholarship in 2009. The award, which enabled Niven to spend a summer playing club rugby in Auckland, has traditionally been a stepping stone to further honours and Niven's arrival at Edinburgh is the first step in that process.

Niven, who was in the Trinity Academy first XV for three seasons before progressing to Edinburgh Accies, played at tighthead in all of Scotland's matches in the 2008 under-20 Six Nations Championship. He made his debut in the France game at Falkirk, and scored a try against England at the same venue. In June 2008, he played in three games in the IRB Junior World Championship in Wales. He represented Edinburgh at under-18 level before winning national recognition at that level in the Home Unions' 2006 under-18 tournament, staged in Gloucestershire. In 2007, he played for Scotland in the IRB under-19 world championship in Belfast and was a member of Accies' squad for the Scottish Hydro Electric Cup Final against Glasgow Hawks.

Sporting positions
Preceded by Roddy Grant	John Macphail Scholarship; Lewis Niven; 2009	Succeeded by Finlay Gillies
