= Graham Hogg (rugby union, born 1987) =

Scottish rugby union player

- Born: 29 August 1987 (age 39)
- Height: 181 cm (5 ft 11 in)
- Weight: 78 kg (172 lb; 12 st 4 lb)
- Notable relative(s): Stuart Hogg, brother

Rugby union career
- Position: Fly half / Centre
Amateur team(s)
Years	Team	Apps	(Points)
-	Hawick		
2013-15	Biella Rugby		
2015-16	East Grinstead		
2016-17	Scarborough RUFC		
2017-19	Greenock Wanderers		
Senior career
Years	Team	Apps	(Points)
2007	Border Reivers	0	(0)
Provincial / State sides
Years	Team	Apps	(Points)
-	Borders U16		
-	Borders U18		
International career
Years	Team	Apps	(Points)
-	Scotland U18		
–	Scotland U19		
–	Scotland U20		
National sevens team
Years	Team		Comps
2008	Scotland 7s		8
Coaching career
- Years: Team
- West of Scotland
- 2015-16: East Grinstead (Development)
- 2016-17: English Rugby Union (Development)
- 2017-19: Greenock Wanderers (Development)
- 2021-2024: Hawick "Development"
- 2024-: Hawick (Head Coach)

Graham Hogg is a Scottish rugby union coach and former player. He played for Scotland 7s. He is a founder of Make Minds Move, a mental health charity.

== Rugby union career ==
=== Amateur career ===
He played for Hawick.

He was awarded the John MacPhail scholarship in 2006 and played club rugby in New Zealand.

He played for Biella rugby club in Italy.

He played for the 'G-Force' team of East Grinstead.

He later played for Greenock Wanderers when he was also a development officer at the club. He took the team to the Shield final at Murrayfield in 2019. He retired at the end of that season.

=== Provincial and professional career ===
He played for Borders U16 and Borders U18 grades.

He was with the Border Reivers shortly before the club folded in 2007.

=== International career ===
He was capped at age-grades for Scotland at Under 18, Under 19 and Under 20s.

He then went on to secure Scotland 7s caps, and represented Scotland in the Hong Kong Sevens event twice.

=== Coaching career ===
He coached at West of Scotland.

He was a development officer at East Grinstead when he played there.

He was a development coach for the English Rugby Union in 2016-17.

He then became a development officer at Greenock Wanderers.

Hogg became a development coach for his hometown club Hawick in the 2021/22 season. Following the departure of Matty Douglas in 2023/24, Hogg then became head coach of the club in March 2024. Winning the Scottish cup and finishing runners up in the Premiership in his first season in charge.

== Charity career ==
Hogg set up the charity Make Minds Move to try and remove stigma around mental health issues, with his friend Adam Clayton from Sussex.

Hogg explained that he set-up the charity to do a cycling challenge to raise monies for mental health:

Adam was my captain when I played down south at G-Force in East Grinstead and I gave him a call because I knew he was involved in events and could help me perhaps get the cycling challenge off the ground.

He was keen to help and we also got chatting about mental health issues that we had both faced in our careers. We both played at good levels, but went through a lot of different things and we are really passionate about trying to help guys who are transitioning out of rugby and the younger generation coming through.

We don't want them to get as low as we were at one stage and we hope that Make Minds Move can get more guys talking with their team mates and their former team mates as well as opening up in general with the physical challenges thrown in to really get people focused on something away from the rugby field, but something that is testing and fun.

Hogg and Clayton completed a 24 hour cycling marathon in June 2020.

== Business career ==
He was a Sports Agent for TDB Sports in 2020.

He now works as a Sales Executive for Borders Motor Group.

== Family ==
His brother is the former Scotland international player Stuart Hogg.

His father John Hogg won the league with Hawick and is now a rugby union referee.

== Honours ==
=== As a Coach ===
==== Hawick ====
- Scottish Premiership
  - Runners up (1) 2023/24
- Scottish Cup
  - Winners (1) 2023/24

Sporting positions
Preceded by John Barclay	John Macphail Scholarship; Graham Hogg; 2006	Succeeded by Kevin Bryce
