= Harry Leonard (rugby union) =

Scottish rugby union player

- Born: Harry William Leonard; 28 April 1992 (age 34) Brighton, England
- Height: 185 cm (6 ft 1 in)
- Weight: 88 kg (13 st 12 lb)
- School: Brighton College

Rugby union career
- Position: Fly-half / Centre
Amateur team(s)
Years	Team	Apps	(Points)
- Brighton Blues
–	Boroughmuir RFC	2011–2012	
Senior career
Years	Team	Apps	(Points)
2011–2014	Edinburgh Rugby	43	(130)
2014–2016	Yorkshire Carnegie	46	(315)
2016–	Rosslyn Park	53	(453)
- Correct as of 12 May 2018
International career
Years	Team	Apps	(Points)
2010	Scotland U18		
2012	Scotland U20	10	(39)
- Correct as of 15 May 2017

Harry William Leonard (born 28 April 1992) is a Scottish professional rugby union player.

== International career ==
Leonard impressed in the first half of his debut season before refocusing on the 2012 Under-20 6 Nations championship. He was named as captain of the Under-20 Squad for the Junior World Championships in South Africa. He has represented Scotland at under-18 level and Scotland under-20, 2011 under-20 6 Nations.

== Club career ==
Leonard joined Edinburgh as an elite development player in the summer of 2011 shortly before travelling to New Zealand as one of the 3 players selected for the McPhail Scholarship. Despite still being eligible for under-20 rugby, Leonard showed clear composure from stand-off in the RaboDirect Pro 12 and Heineken cup.

For the 2013–14 season, Leonard was drafted to Melrose and played a key role in their win over defending club champions Ayr. He kicked a conversion and a penalty in the important early season game played in Ayr.

On 2 April 2014, Leonard signed a contract to join Yorkshire Carnegie who compete in the RFU Championship from the 2014–15 season.

After two seasons with Yorkshire Carnegie, and despite a decent scoring record for the side, Harry signed for ambitious Rosslyn Park playing in National League 1. His debut season with Rosslyn Park was very successful for Harry on a personal note as he finished as the divisions top scorer for 2016-17 with 265 points.

== Rugby union season-by-season playing stats ==
=== Club ===
Season	Club	Competition	Appearances	Tries	Drop Goals	Conversions	Penalties	Total Points
2011-12	Edinburgh	Pro 12	7	1	0	2	12	45
2011-12	Edinburgh	Heineken Cup	3	0	0	2	1	7
2012-13	Edinburgh	Pro 12	8	0	0	4	10	38
2012-13	Edinburgh	Heineken Cup	1	0	0	0	0	0
2012-13	Melrose	Scottish Premiership	?	?	?	?	?	?
2012-13	Melrose	British & Irish Cup	1	0	0	0	0	0
2013-14	Edinburgh	Pro 12	18	0	0	6	10	42
2013-14	Edinburgh	Heineken Cup	3	0	0	0	0	0
2013-14	Gala	Scottish Premiership	?	?	?	?	?	?
2013-14	Gala	British & Irish Cup	1	0	0	1	0	2
2014-15	Yorkshire Carnegie	RFU Championship	22	2	0	29	34	170
2014-15	Yorkshire Carnegie	British & Irish Cup	3	1	0	15	1	38
2015-16	Yorkshire Carnegie	RFU Championship	17	0	0	34	11	101
2015-16	Yorkshire Carnegie	British & Irish Cup	4	0	0	3	0	6
2016-17	Rosslyn Park	National League 1	27	3	0	71	36	265
2017-18	Rosslyn Park	National League 1	26	2	0	53	24	188

=== International/Representative ===
Season	Side	Competition	Appearances	Tries	Drop Goals	Conversions	Penalties	Total Points
2011-12	Scotland Under 20	Under 20s Six Nations	5	0	0	1	1	5
2012-13	Scotland Under 20	Under 20s Six Nations	5	1	0	4	7	34

== Honours & records ==
Rosslyn Park

- National League 1 top points scorer: 2016-17 (265 points)

== Notes ==
Sporting positions
Preceded by Finlay Gillies	John Macphail Scholarship; Grant Gilchrist, Harry Leonard, George Turner; 2011	Succeeded by Jonny Gray, Gregor Hunter
