= Sam Hidalgo-Clyne =

Scotland international rugby union player

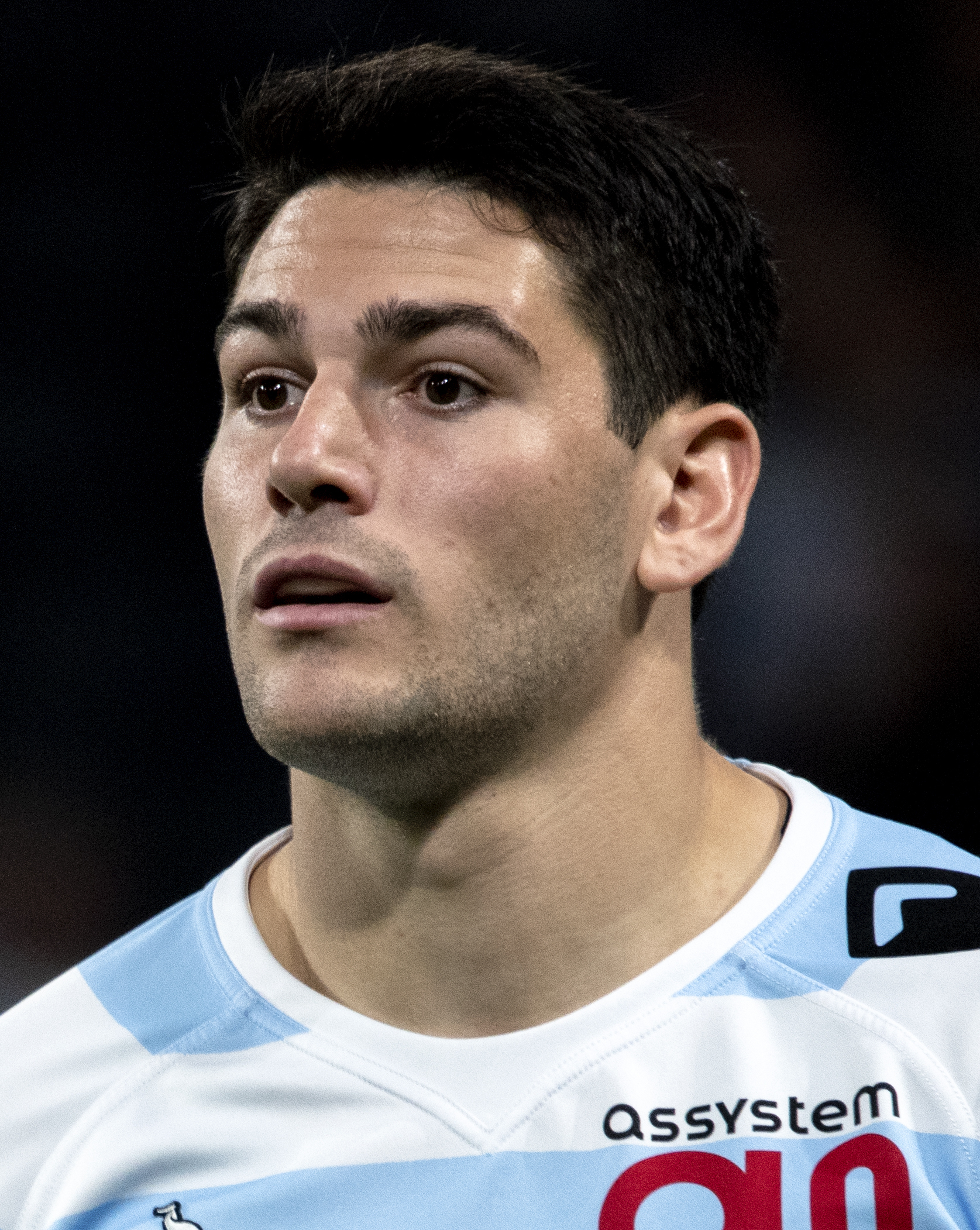
- Born: Samuel Peter Hidalgo-Clyne; 4 August 1993 (age 33) Granada, Spain
- Height: 1.75 m (5 ft 9 in)
- Weight: 84.2 kg (13 st 4 lb)
- School: Corstorphine Primary, The Royal High School, Merchiston Castle School
- University: Edinburgh University

Rugby union career
- Position: Scrum half
Amateur team(s)
Years	Team	Apps	(Points)
- Forrester RFC
Senior career
Years	Team	Apps	(Points)
2011–2018	Edinburgh Rugby	107	(470)
2018–2019	Scarlets	16	(7)
2019	→Harlequins	6	(5)
2019	Racing 92	6	(15)
2019–2020	Lyon	7	(0)
2020–2022	Exeter Chiefs	32	(20)
2022−2024	Benetton	11	(5)
- Correct as of 14 Jan 2023
International career
Years	Team	Apps	(Points)
2011–2013	Scotland U20	12	(5)
2015–2020	Scotland	14	(7)
- Correct as of 1 February 2022
National sevens team
Years	Team		Comps
2011–2012	Scotland 7s		5 (9)

Samuel Hidalgo-Clyne (born 4 August 1993) is a Scottish rugby union player who most recently played for Benetton Rugby in the United Rugby Championship. His primary position is as a scrum-half.

== Early life ==
Born in Jayena, Granada, Spain, Hidalgo-Clyne moved to Edinburgh at the age of three. He began playing rugby at primary school for Forrester RFC and continued there when he started his secondary schooling at the Royal High School. Having gained a scholarship, he attended Merchiston Castle School where he played as a stand-off before being selected as a scrum-half.

== Club career ==
Hidalgo-Clyne specialised in international sevens for the 2011–12 season and joined Edinburgh's elite development roster in the summer of 2012.

Hidalgo-Clyne was awarded a place on the 2013 Macphail Scholarship to New Zealand.

Upon his return, Hidalgo-Clyne put himself in contention for a place in the senior squad and made his debut against Munster in September 2013. His first try for the club came in the opening minute of Edinburgh's 48–0 defeat of Benetton Treviso in December 2014. At the end of the 2014–15 season, Hidalgo-Clyne was named the Pro12 Young Player of the Year.

After seven seasons with Edinburgh, Hidalgo-Clyne left the club to join Welsh region Scarlets from the 2018-19 season. He left Scarlets early to join French giants Racing 92 in the Top 14 as cover during the 2019 Rugby World Cup Afterwards, Hidalgo-Clyne signed a short-term contract with Lyon until the end of the 2018-19 season.

On 17 February 2020, Hidalgo-Clyne agreed to move to Exeter Chiefs in the English Gallagher Premiership on a two-year deal from 2020-21 season.

On 3 February 2022, Hidalgo-Clyne would leave Exeter as he signs for Italy region Benetton on a three-year deal in the United Rugby Championship ahead of the 2022-23 season. He played for Benetton until 2023–24 United Rugby Championship season.

== International career ==
Hidalgo-Clyne made his full Scotland debut on Saturday 7 February 2015, coming off the replacements' bench in a 15–8 defeat to France in the 2015 Six Nations Championship, and did so again in each of the remaining four matches.

Hidalgo-Clyne has also represented Scotland under-17, under-18, under-20 and Scotland Sevens.

== Coaching career ==
On 5 August 2025, Italian club Mogliano Rugby announced Hidalgo-Clyne as new head coach of their reserve team, which plays in the domestic "Serie B" second-tier league.

Sporting positions
Preceded by Jonny Gray, Gregor Hunter	John Macphail Scholarship; Finn Russell, Sam Hidalgo-Clyne; 2013	Succeeded by Ewan McQuillin, Adam Ashe
