= Adam Ashe =

Scottish rugby union player

- Born: 24 July 1993 (age 33) Livingston, West Lothian, Scotland
- Height: 6 ft 4 in (193 cm)
- Weight: 110 kg (17 st 5 lb; 240 lb)
- School: Alva Academy

Rugby union career
- Position: Number Eight / Loose forward
Amateur team(s)
Years	Team	Apps	(Points)
- Hillfoots
- Stirling County
2014	University of Canterbury RFC		
2016–2017	Ayr		
2017–2019	Stirling County		
Senior career
Years	Team	Apps	(Points)
2011–2020	Glasgow Warriors	73	(65)
2020–2022	LA Giltinis	17	
Super Rugby
Years	Team	Apps	(Points)
2019–2020	Stirling Wolves	3	(5)
International career
Years	Team	Apps	(Points)
2010	Scotland U17		
2011	Scotland U18		
2010–2013	Scotland U20	10	(20)
2014–2020	Scotland	6	(0)
- Correct as of 6 February 2016
National sevens team
Years	Team		Comps
2011–2012	Scotland 7s		9 (10)
Coaching career
- Years: Team
- 2020–22: UCLA Bruins RFC (Defence Coach)
- 2022–24: Stirling Wolves (Asst. coach)
- 2025–: Glasgow Hawks (Forwards Coach)

Adam Ashe (born 24 July 1993 in Glasgow) is a Scotland international rugby union coach and former player. He is the Forwards Coach for the Glasgow Hawks. He previously played for the LA Giltinis of Major League Rugby in the MLR; and for Glasgow Warriors in the URC; and Stirling Wolves in the Super 6.

He played at the either Number 8 or Flanker.

== Rugby Union career ==
=== Amateur career ===
Ashe, a product of Alva Academy, has played rugby for Hillfooots and Stirling County

In 2016, he turned out for Ayr in the Scottish Premiership.

Ashe has been drafted to Stirling County in the Scottish Premiership for the 2017–18 season.

=== Professional career ===
Ashe was named as an Elite Development Player in 2011, being attached to Glasgow Warriors.

He earned his first cap for Glasgow, coming off the bench in the 78th minute against the Ospreys on 14 September 2012. He is Glasgow Warrior No. 205. He was also named on the bench a week later, but was not used in the 27–10 victory over Connacht.

In addition to playing for Glasgow Warriors, Ashe played in the Super 6 tournament for Stirling Wolves.

After leaving the Warriors he played 17 times for the LA Giltinis. He announced his retirement from playing in July 2022 after a neck injury.

=== International career ===
Ashe played for the Scotland under-17's team at the Wellington International Festival in 2010, as well as travelling to Valladolid, Spain as a member in a development training squad.

He also featured in the Scottish national sevens team for the 2011–12 season, playing in all nine tournament on the Sevens circuit.

The following year, Ashe was named in the Scotland under-18's squad for the 2011 European Under-18 Rugby Union Championship.

In 2013, he played for the Scotland under-20's team in every Six Nations Under 20s Championship match, which included a man of the match performance against Ireland under-20's. Ashe gained a further five caps for the U20s side in the 2013 IRB Junior World Championship, where Scotland under-20s finished 10th.

On 3 April 2014, Ashe was named the recipient for the John McPhail scholarship in 2014. However, midway through his scholarship, Ashe was called up by new Scotland Head Coach Vern Cotter, for the Scottish national side's test match with South Africa. He started that match at Number 8, playing the full 80 minutes.

=== Coaching career ===
He was a defence coach with the UCLA Bruins rugby union side in his time in Los Angeles.

Just three days after Ashe announced his playing career ended, he was announced as the Super 6 side Stirling Wolves assistant coach.

He moved to be the Forwards Coach of Glasgow Hawks in 2025.

== Business career ==
He is now the Business Club Manager at Glasgow Warriors, taking over from Jim Taylor MBE.

Sporting positions
Preceded by Finn Russell, Sam Hidalgo-Clyne	John Macphail Scholarship; Ewan McQuillin, Adam Ashe; 2014	Succeeded by Ben Robbins, Callum Hunter-Hill
