= Finlay Gillies =

Scottish rugby union player

- Born: Finlay Gillies; 13 February 1989 (age 37)
- Height: 1.73 m (5 ft 8 in)
- Weight: 95 kg (14 st 13 lb)
- School: Dunbar Grammar School

Rugby union career
- Position: Hooker
Amateur team(s)
| Years | Team | Apps | (Points) |
- Glasgow Hawks
Senior career
| Years | Team | Apps | (Points) |
| 2010 | Edinburgh | 1 | (0) |
| 2011–2014 | Glasgow Warriors | 23 | (0) |
- Correct as of 19 May 2013
International career
| Years | Team | Apps | (Points) |
| 2009 | Scotland U20 | | |
| – | Scotland Club XV | | |
National sevens team
| Years | Team | | Comps |
| 2010- | Scotland 7s | | 6 |
Coaching career
- Years: Team
- 2015-: Glasgow Hawks (player-coach)

Finlay Gillies (born 13 February 1989) is a Scottish rugby union player. He played as a hooker for Glasgow Warriors in the PRO12.

Gillies has represented both Scotland under 20 and Scotland Sevens and has made more than 20 appearances for his club since joining in 2010.

Gillies left Glasgow at the end of the 2013–14 season. In January 2015 Gillies was named as player-coach of Glasgow Hawks.

Sporting positions
| Preceded by Lewis Niven | John Macphail Scholarship; Finlay Gillies; 2010 | Succeeded by Grant Gilchrist, Harry Leonard, George Turner |
