= Grant Gilchrist =

Scotland international rugby union player

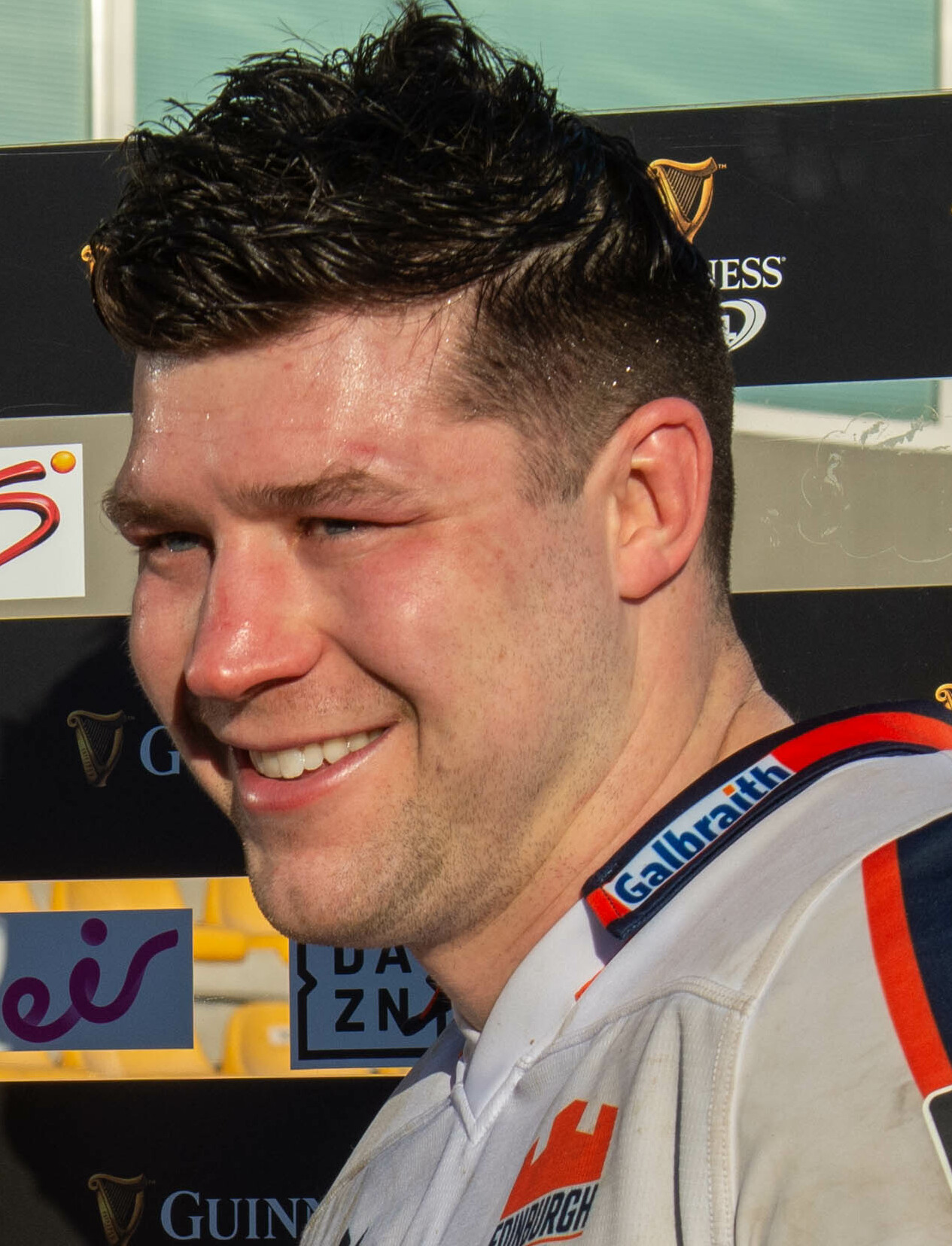
- Gilchrist in 2021
- Full name: Grant Stuart Gilchrist
- Born: 9 August 1990 (age 36) Stirling, Scotland
- Height: 2.00 m (6 ft 7 in)
- Weight: 118 kg (260 lb; 18 st 8 lb)
- School: Lornshill Academy

Rugby union career
- Position: Lock
- Current team: Edinburgh Rugby
Senior career
Years	Team	Apps	(Points)
2011–	Edinburgh Rugby	214	(20)
- Correct as of 25 February 2025
International career
Years	Team	Apps	(Points)
2008–2009	Scotland U19	8	(0)
2009–2010	Scotland U20	8	(0)
2013–	Scotland	78	(5)
- Correct as of 25 February 2025

Grant Stuart Gilchrist (born 9 August 1990) is a Scottish professional rugby union player who plays as a lock for United Rugby Championship club Edinburgh and the Scotland national team.

== Early life ==
Gilchrist was schooled at Lornshill Academy, and played with Alloa RFC before moving on to Stirling County RFC.

Initially an Elite Development player at Edinburgh Rugby and following a stint in New Zealand as part of the John Macphail Scholarship, he made his first senior appearance in a 34–13 win over Cardiff Blues in September 2011. In 2015 he was made the club's vice-captain. In August 2016, Edinburgh Rugby named him and Stuart McInally as their co-captains for the coming season.

== International career ==
Gilchrist represented Scotland at under-18, under-19, under-20 levels. He received his first full cap for Scotland against France in the 2013 Six Nations Championship at the Stade de France, aged 22. He was not selected to play in any of Scotland's 2014 Six Nations matches under Scott Johnson. Vern Cotter selected him for the 2014 Scotland rugby union tour of the Americas and South Africa. He captained Scotland for the first time on 20 June 2014 against Argentina, having scored his first international try against Canada the previous week.

Gilchrist was named as captain for Scotland's 2014 Autumn Test campaign, but was forced to withdraw the same week of that announcement when he broke his arm while playing for Edinburgh against Lyon. Complications with this injury also led him to miss the 2015 Six Nations Championship and the rest of the 2014–15 Pro12 season.

In 2023, Gilchrist was selected in Scotland's 33 player squad for the 2023 Rugby World Cup in France.

== Career statistics ==
=== International analysis by opposition ===
Opposition	Played	Win	Loss	Draw	Tries	Points	Win %
Argentina	7	6	1	0	0	0	.857
Australia	5	2	3	0	0	0	.400
Canada	2	2	0	0	1	5	1.000
England	4	3	0	1	0	0	.875
Fiji	2	2	0	0	0	0	1.000
France	11	5	6	0	0	0	.455
Georgia	3	3	0	0	0	0	1.000
Ireland	6	0	6	0	0	0	.000
Italy	7	7	0	0	0	0	1.000
Japan	3	2	1	0	0	0	.667
New Zealand	2	0	2	0	0	0	.000
Romania	3	2	1	0	0	0	.667
Russia	1	1	0	0	0	0	1.000
Samoa	2	1	1	0	0	0	.500
South Africa	2	0	2	0	0	0	.000
United States	3	2	1	0	0	0	.667
Wales	5	1	4	0	0	0	.200
Career	64	36	27	1	1	5	.570

as of 26 August 2023

Sporting positions
Preceded by Finlay Gillies	John Macphail Scholarship; Grant Gilchrist, Harry Leonard, George Turner; 2011	Succeeded by Jonny Gray, Gregor Hunter
