= John Macphail (rugby union) =

Scotland international rugby union player

- Born: John Alexander Rose Macphail; 14 October 1923 Singapore
- Died: 10 June 2004 (aged 80) Pitlochry, Scotland

Rugby union career
- Position: Hooker
Amateur team(s)
Years	Team	Apps	(Points)
- Edinburgh Academicals
Provincial / State sides
Years	Team	Apps	(Points)
- Edinburgh District
International career
Years	Team	Apps	(Points)
1949-51	Scotland	2	(0)

John Macphail (14 October 1923 – 10 June 2004) was a Scottish international rugby union player. The John Macphail Scholarship for Scottish rugby union players is named in the memory of the player.

== Rugby Union career ==
=== Amateur career ===
Macphail was born in the Amber Mansions of Singapore; but brought up in first in South Africa and then in Scotland. He attended Edinburgh Academy, and played rugby union for Edinburgh Academicals.

=== Provincial career ===
He was capped for Edinburgh District. He played in the 1949 inter-city match against Glasgow District.

=== International career ===
He was capped for Scotland twice, playing first against England at Twickenham in 1949, and then against South Africa at Murrayfield in 1951.

== Business career ==
He became the Chairman of the Scottish Whisky Association; and of the Edrington Group in Glasgow. He was awarded the CBE medal.

== Family ==
His father Lachlan Rose Macphail was a Scottish stockbroker. He died in 1937, when John Macphail was just 13.

Macphail married Edith Crabbie in Edinburgh in 1947.

They had 2 children: Copper and Michael.

== Death ==
He was buried in Logierait Churchyard.

== Scholarship ==
The John Macphail Scholarship is a rugby union scholarship for up and coming Scottish players, and is made by the Robertson Trust in memory of John Macphail. The scholarship began for season 2005-06 and is awarded annually.
