= Roddy Grant (rugby union) =

Scottish rugby union player

- Born: Roderick Robert Grant; 31 January 1987 (age 39) Botswana
- Height: 1.81 m (5 ft 11 in)
- Weight: 102 kg (16 st 1 lb)
- School: Hilton College
- Occupation: Rugby coach

Rugby union career
- Position: Flanker
Senior career
Years	Team	Apps	(Points)
2006–2007	Borders	1	(0)
2009–2015	Edinburgh	138	(55)
- Correct as of 12 May 2017
International career
Years	Team	Apps	(Points)
2009–2015	Scotland A	9	
National sevens team
Years	Team		Comps
2006–2015	Scotland 7s		12
Coaching career
- Years: Team
- 2016–17: Scottish Rugby Academy (asst. coach)
- 2017-18: Edinburgh Rugby (Forwards coach)
- 2019–24: Ulster(Forwards coach)
- 2024–25: Georgia (asst. coach)
- 2025-26: Glasgow Warriors (asst. coach)

Roderick Robert Grant is a Scottish rugby union coach and former Scotland 7s international player. He was previously an Assistant Coach at Glasgow Warriors. He played as a flanker for Border Reivers, Edinburgh and Scotland sevens between 2006 and 2015, and has coached at the Scottish Rugby Academy and Edinburgh. From 2019-2024, he was forwards coach for Ulster.

== Early life ==
Grant was born in Jwaneng, Botswana to Scottish parents and soon after moved to Cape Town, South Africa. He attended Western Province Prep School where he started playing rugby at the age of 11. From there he moved on to Bishops where he continued his sporting career. It was here that Grant was selected to play for the South African under-15 and under-16 waterpolo sides. Halfway through his high school career he moved out of the Western Cape to the Midlands of Natal to attend Hilton College.

It was here that his rugby career really started to take shape moving from the centres to the back row. Grant played for the school's first XV as well as the Natal Schools side. Upon completing high school, Grant moved to Scotland where he began his professional career.

Rugby runs in Roddy's family: his grandfather (Bob) and great-uncle (George) were international referees, the latter was also Scotland full back in 1950 and 1951 and manager of the 1977 Lions in New Zealand, and Grant's father played for British Universities.

== Career ==
He joined Border Reivers in summer 2006 as an apprentice, and the following January he made his debut for the professional team as a substitute in the Magners League match against Newport Gwent Dragons at Rodney Parade. He was awarded the 2008 John Macphail Scholarship, allowing him to have a summer playing for Auckland University club in New Zealand.

Grant started as open-side flanker in all five of Scotland's matches in the 2006 Under 19 Rugby World Championship in Dubai in April 2006. Later that year he made his international sevens debut for Scotland in the Dubai tournament which opened the IRB's 2006–07 series. He played in six of the tournaments in that series. That season, too, he had his Scotland Under-20 debut in the February 2007 match against England in Bath, and he continued in that team for the game against France in Bourg-en-Bresse.

In November 2008 he was the Scottish Thistles’ joint-top scorer with 45 points (nine tries) in the Singapore international sevens, and he went on to play in the Scotland squad in the 2008–09 IRB tournaments in Wellington (New Zealand), San Diego (USA), Hong Kong, Adelaide, Twickenham and Murrayfield as well as the RWC Sevens in Dubai, where he scored four tries in helping Scotland to win the Plate competition. Over the 2008–09 sevens season he scored 23 tries, and his points tally of 115 was second only to Colin Gregor’s 171.

Grant also played two games for Scotland A in the IRB Nations Cup success in Bucharest in June 2009. His debut was as a replacement in the win against Russia, and his first start followed four days later in the victory against Uruguay. That same month he signed a professional contract with Edinburgh, and his Scotland A career continued with a replacement appearance in the 38–7 win against Tonga at Netherdale, Galashiels, in November 2009. Grant was subsequently nominated for Young Player of the Season in the Celtic League for season 2009–10. Grant trained with the senior Scotland squad during the 2010 Six Nations Championship.

On 26 December 2013, Grant made his 100th appearance for Edinburgh, leading the team out onto the Murrayfield pitch for the Boxing Day Pro12 derby clash with Glasgow Warriors.

In March 2015, Grant signed a new contract with Edinburgh until 2016. In August 2015, he scored a hat-trick of tries against Romania's Rugby World Cup side. Edinburgh won the match 31–16. In December 2015 he was forced to retire following an injury.

== Coaching career ==
After retiring as a player, Grant joined the Scottish Rugby Academy and in May 2017 was promoted to Edinburgh forwards' coach. Since 2024 he was forwards coach for Ulster, until he left his post in July 2024.

He joined Glasgow Warriors in June 2025 as an assistant coach but left after an internal review on 27 October 2026.

Sporting positions
Preceded by Kevin Bryce	John Macphail Scholarship; Roddy Grant; 2008	Succeeded by Lewis Niven
