= John Macphail Scholarship =

Rugby union award

- Sport: Rugby Union
- Awarded for: Aspiring players and coaches
- Sponsored by: The Robertson Trust and Scottish Rugby Union
- Country: Scotland

History
- First award: 2005
- First winner: John Barclay

The John Macphail Scholarship is an annual rugby union scholarship award in Scotland. It was first given to talented young players; and was later the scholarship also extended to coaches seeking development. The scholarship is named after the former Scotland international rugby union player John Macphail, who died in 2004. The scholarship is a 5 month immersive rugby union programme abroad. Previously award winners have gone to New Zealand, recent award winners now go to South Africa for the programme.

Due to the coronavirus pandemic, the scholarship was not awarded in 2020 or 2021.

== John Macphail ==
John Macphail was a Scottish rugby union player who played for Edinburgh Academicals, Edinburgh District and the Scotland international side. He was capped twice in the period 1949 to 1951.

He became Chairman of the Edrington Group in Drumchapel, Glasgow; and was awarded a CBE. The Edrington Group is a private company, known for its whiskies like The Famous Grouse, Cutty Sark and The Macallan, and is owned by the Robertson Trust.

The scholarship was awarded in his memory.

== The Robertson Trust ==
The Robertson Trust was established in 1961 when 3 Robertson sisters - owners of the then family run Edrington Group - donated their shares for charitable causes. The trust today is a charity in Scotland that gives grants to alleviate poverty and trauma. In addition, the Robertson Trust also provide monies for young people to help them progress in their career, and to mitigate financial barriers.

The trust, together with the Scottish Rugby Union, in this award thus provides financial backing for these players and coaches to develop in their rugby union career.

In 2023, Jim Robertson, CEO of the Robertson Trust stated:

The John Macphail Scholarship has proved to be instrumental in the development of some of the brightest player and coach prospects in Scotland and The Robertson Trust is incredibly proud to have been part of that journey.

== List of awardees ==
Year No.	Year	Player 1	Player 2	Player 3	Coach 1	Coach 2
1	2005	John Barclay				
2	2006	Graham Hogg				
3	2007	Kevin Bryce				
4	2008	Roddy Grant				
5	2009	Lewis Niven				
6	2010	Finlay Gillies				
7	2011	Grant Gilchrist	Harry Leonard	George Turner		
8	2012	Jonny Gray	Gregor Hunter		Chris Paterson	Ben Fisher
9	2013	Sam Hidalgo-Clyne	Finn Russell		Shade Munro	Alex Duncan
10	2014	Adam Ashe	Ewan McQuillin		Don Caskie	Kenny Murray
11	2015	Callum Hunter-Hill	Ben Robbins		Ben Cairns	Duncan Hodge
12	2016	Paddy Kelly	Ross McCann		Mike Blair	Calum Forrester
13	2017	Angus Fraser	Andrew Jardine	Guy Kelly		
14	2018	Thomas Jeffrey	Jacob Henry	Kristian Kay		
15	2019	Mikey Heron	Cole Lamberton	Adam Scott		
16	2020	No awards - coronavirus				
17	2021	No awards - coronavirus				
18	2022	No awards - coronavirus				
19	2023	Guy Kirkpatrick	Monroe Job	Callum Smyth		
20	2024	Ben White	Joss Arnold	Jack Craig		
21	2025	Angus Wright	Oliver Furness	Sandy Renwick		
