= Hillfoots RFC =

Scottish rugby union club, based in Tillicoultry

(Scotland) Hillfoots RFC
- Full name: Hillfoots Rugby Football Club
- Union: Scottish Rugby Union
- Founded: 1971; 55 years ago
- Ground: Tillicoultry Public Park
- President: Peter Norman
- Coach(es): Eric Urquhart (men), Ross McNeil (women), Barry Munro (youths & juniors)
- Captain(s): Ian Lightley (men), Christina Swinton (women)
- League(s): Caledonia Division 1 (men), Midlands/East Division 1 (women)
Team kit

Hillfoots RFC is a Scottish rugby union club based in Tillicoultry, Clackmannanshire. The club plays its home games at the Public Park in Tillicoultry.

The club runs two senior men's XVs (a 1st XV and an occasional 2nd XV (the Rams)), a senior women's team (the Vixens), and a veterans men's team (the Cast Tups). The club also run youths and junior squads from P1 to U18 age-groups, working closely with the local primary schools and the high school, Alva Academy.

Hillfoots men's 1st XV currently play in the Caledonia League Division 1 and the Vixens play in Caledonia Midlands/East League Division 1.

== History ==
After a public meeting in the Congregational Church Hall in Tillicoultry on Monday 7 December 1970, Hillfoots Rugby Football Club was founded. The club's first game was against an Alloa RFC 4th XV in the public park on 6 March 1971. Hillfoots were victorious by 18 points to 11.

After a season of non-league friendly fixtures in 1971-72, the club entered the Midlands District League the following season. Promotion to National League Division VII was achieved in 1975, to Division VI in 1982 and to Division V in 1984 where the club remained for over a decade.

Three of its most famous players John Manson, Danny Herrington and Bob Cairney formed a front row in the 1990s called the 'Tillicoultry Troglodytes'. All three went on to play for Dundee HSFP.

The club's most sustained period of success began in 2000 when Sandy Penman and Brian Ireland, as captain and player-coach, led the club to successive promotions to National League Division I, then the third tier of Scottish club rugby.

An unsuccessful and short-lived merger with Alloa RFC coincided with a slide back down the divisions as the core of a very successful team began to retire. By 2010, due to relegations and league reconstruction, the club found itself back in the regional divisions. The club was awarded the Scottish Rugby Union's club of the month award in October 2011.

Since the early 2010s, most seasons have been spent in Caledonia Division 1, with brief spells one level lower. The club was promoted to Caledonia Division 1 for season 2025-26, finishing third in the ten team division - their highest placing since 2011-12.

On 15 February 2025, Hillfoots defeated Alloa in the final of the Caledonia Midlands Bowl. The game, dubbed 'El Clacksico' was played at Tilly Park. The final score was 24-17. Hillfoots' try scorers were Danny Cockroft and Duncan Arthur. Man of the match Aidan Kerr contributed a drop goal, a penalty and a conversion and Andy Fraser scored two penalties.

As part of the club's 50th anniversary celebrations in 2021, a history of the club was published and made available for sale. The book, entitled 'Fifty Years Together - An Incomplete History of Hillfoots RFC', was authored by Gerry Docherty with assistance from Peter Norman, Alistair Spowage and Gavin Spowage.

The club started a women's team in September 2023, nicknamed the Vixens. After a successful first season of friendly fixtures, the Vixens were accepted into the national league set-up and played in Caledonia Midlands/East League 2 in 2024-25, finishing in mid-table. The following season they finished third in the same division and made it to the final of the National Shield, losing to Lenzie at the Hive stadium at Murrayfield. League reconstruction has resulted in the Vixens playing in Caledonia Midlands/East League Division 1 in 2026-27.

== Notable former players ==
=== Scotland internationalists ===
The following former Hillfoots players have represented Scotland at full international level.

- (Scotland) John Manson
- (Scotland) Jamie Bhatti
- (Scotland) Adam Ashe

=== North and Midlands ===
The following former Hillfoots players have represented North and Midlands at provincial level.

- (Scotland) Danny Herrington

=== Caledonia Reds players ===
The following former Hillfoots players have represented Caledonia Reds at professional level.

- (Scotland) Danny Herrington
- (Scotland) John Manson

== Honours ==
Men's League competition:

- National League Division 3
  - Runners-up: 2001-02
- National League Division 4
  - Runners-up: 2000-01
- National League Division 5
  - Winners: 1999-00
- National League Division 6
  - Runners-up: 1983-84
- Midlands District League
  - Winners: 1974-75; 1978-79
- Caledonia Division 1
  - Runners-up: 2010-11; 2011-12
- Caledonia Division 2 Midlands
  - Winners: 2013-14; 2017-18

Men's Cup competition:

- Caledonia Midlands Bowl
  - Winners: 2024-25

Women's Cup competition:

- National Shield
  - Runners-up: 2025-26

== Presidents, Club Captains and Coaches ==
The following table lists all presidents, men's club captains and men's 1st XV coaches of the club since its first season in 1971/72.

Season	President	Club Captain	1st XV Coach(es)	Players' Player of the Year
1971-72	Rev. Morgan Philips	Billy Lyons		
1972-73	John Murray	Fraser Mason	Bob Dewar	
1973-74	John Murray	Bob Dewar	Bob Dewar	
1974-75	John Murray	John Perry	Colin Davies	
1975-76	John A Scott	Tommy Walker	Colin Davies	
1976-77	John A Scott	Dave Kenyon	Colin Davies	
1977-78	John A Scott	John Perry	Colin Davies	
1978-79	John A Scott	Peter Norman	Alan Aaron	Ray Inglis
1979-80	John A Scott	Peter Norman	Alan Aaron	Duncan Findlay
1980-81	John A Scott	Alistair Spowage	Tommy Watters	Kevin Manson
1981-82	Alan Aaron	Kevin Manson	Davy Prentice	Gregor Kennedy
1982-83	Alan Aaron	Kevin Manson	Dave Kenyon, Bill Kinross & Davy Prentice	Jim Bell
1983-84	I G Gourlay	Peter Norman	Bill Kinross	Alan Gray
1984-85	T I Scott	Peter Norman	Bill Kinross	Kevin Manson
1985-86	T I Scott	Dougie Whitehead	Bill Kinross	Danny Herrington
1986-87	T I Scott	Dougie Whitehead	Bill Young	Alan Manson
1987-88	T I Scott	Dougie Whitehead	Bill Young	John Manson & Danny Herrington
1988-89	Alan Aaron	Kevin Manson	Brian Jamieson & Charlie Forbes	Simon Bowyer
1989-90	Alan Aaron	Andy Grinly	Dave Kenyon & Bill Young	Alan Manson
1990-91	Alan Aaron	Alan Manson	Alan Prentice	Mark Carberry
1991-92	Alan Aaron	Gregor Kennedy		Mark Carberry
1992-93	Alan Aaron	Alistair Spowage	Alec McCulloch	A Baker
1993-94	Alan Aaron	Peter Norman	Alan Prentice	Callum Hamilton
1994-95	John Pritchard	Peter Norman	Dougie Whitehead	P Horne
1995-96	Martin Ross	Dougie Whitehead		Willie McCune
1996-97	Martin Ross	Jim Bell	Tony Howard	Jim Bell
1997-98	Peter Norman	Jim Bell	Tony Howard	Callum Hamilton & Mike Wynd
1998-99	Peter Norman	Davie Stirratt	Brian Ireland	Brian Ireland
1999-00	Peter Norman	Brian Ireland	Brian Ireland	Mike Wynd
2000-01	Peter Norman	Brian Ireland	Brian Ireland	Jim Dawson
2001-02	Peter Norman	Brian Ireland	Brian Ireland	Sandy Penman
2002-03	Peter Norman	Sandy Penman	Brian Ireland	Mike Slade
2003-04	Peter Norman	Sandy Penman	Brian Ireland	Iain Nicolson
2004-05	Peter Norman	Sandy Penman	Brian Ireland	Iain Nicolson
2005-06	Peter Norman	Sandy Penman	Brian Ireland	Andrew Hamilton
2006-07	Peter Norman	Mike Slade	Brian Ireland	Mike Slade
2007-08	Peter Norman	Mike Slade	Brian Ireland	A Pudney
2008-09	Peter Norman	Andrew Hamilton	Brian Ireland	Calum McGee
2009-10	Peter Norman	Ian Kelley	Brian Ireland	Gavin Spowage
2010-11	Peter Norman	Gavin Spowage	Iain Nicolson	Iain Nicolson
2011-12	Peter Norman	Gavin Spowage	Kevin Manson	Craig Scott
2012-13	Peter Norman	Gavin Spowage	Iain Nicolson	Jamie Murchie
2013-14	Peter Norman	Campbell Calder	Iain Nicolson	David McCulloch
2014-15	Eddie Inglis	Campbell Calder	Stuart McGee	Mark Hunter
2015-16	Eddie Inglis	Gavin Spowage	Murray McKenzie	Duncan Arthur
2016-17	Eddie Inglis	Gregor Manson	Rudi Urbach, Ian Hamilton & Ritchie Bruce	Danny Ross
2017-18	Paddy Sherrard	Iain Nicolson	Ian Hamilton, Ritchie Bruce & Mark Hunter	Greig Anderson
2018-19	Gavin Spowage	Alan Steele	Mark Hunter	Davie Cree & John McMurdo
2019-20	Gavin Spowage	Keith Slade	Murray Brown, Brad Bell	Fraser Christie
2020-21	Peter Norman	Keith Slade	Murray Brown	n/a
2021-22	Peter Norman	Keith Slade	Murray Brown, Murray McKenzie	Iain Anderson
2022-23	Paddy Sherrard	Keith Slade	Murray McKenzie	Robert Hodge
2023-24	Paddy Sherrard	Paul Slade	Graeme Simpson, Kris Illingworth	Ryan Butterworth
2024-25	Kris Illingworth	Paul Slade	Graeme Simpson, Kris Illingworth, Gregor Manson	Danny Cockroft
2025-26	Kris Illingworth	Paul Slade	Eric Urquhart, Iain Nicolson	Connor Clark
2026-27	Peter Norman	Ian Lightley	Eric Urquhart, Aiden Kerr, Alex Maxwell	

The Hillfoots Vixens' captains, coaches and players' player of the year since their founding in 2023 are listed in the table below.

Season	Captain	Coach(es)	Players' Player of the Year
2023-24	Christina Swinton	Jordan Usher, Ross McNeil	
2024-25	Christina Swinton	Jordan Usher, Ross McNeil	
2025-26	Christina Swinton	Jordan Usher, Ross McNeil	
2026-27	Christina Swinton	Ross McNeil	

== The Bobby McGill Cup ==
Since 2018, Hillfoots RFC and Alloa RFC have competed for the Bobby McGill Cup, donated by the family of the former leader of Clackmannanshire Council. The two rugby clubs have long enjoyed a competitive rivalry although have rarely competed in the same division over the years. Since 2018, the cup has been awarded to the victorious team, as shown in bold in the table below. The cup is not played for in any pre-season or 'friendly' fixtures. Hillfoots are currently slightly ahead with five victories to Alloa's four.

Date	Competition	Venue	Score
15 September 2018	Caledonia Division 1	Earlsfield	**Alloa** 29-12 Hillfoots
1 December 2018	Caledonia Division 1	Tilly Park	**Hillfoots** 35-15 Alloa
31 August 2019	Caledonia Division 1	Tilly Park	**Hillfoots** 29-13 Alloa
18 January 2020	Caledonia Division 1	Earlsfield	Alloa 7-24 **Hillfoots**
12 October 2024	Caledonia Division 2 Midlands	Tilly Park	Hillfoots 10-19 **Alloa**
8 February 2025	Caledonia Division 2 Midlands	Earlsfield	Alloa 3-16 **Hillfoots**
15 February 2025	Caledonia Midlands Bowl Final	Tilly Park	**Hillfoots** 24-17 Alloa
4 October 2025	Caledonia Division 1	Earlsfield	**Alloa** 28-22 Hillfoots
17 January 2026	Caledonia Division 1	Tilly Park	Hillfoots 10-12 **Alloa**
19 September 2026	Caledonia Division 1	Earlsfield	
12 December 2026	Caledonia Division 1	Tilly Park	
