= Ewan McQuillin =

Scottish rugby union player

- Born: Ewan McQuillin; 12 November 1991 (age 35) Melrose, Scotland
- Height: 1.80 m (5 ft 11 in)
- Weight: 120 kg (18 st 13 lb)

Rugby union career
- Position: Tighthead Prop
Amateur team(s)
Years	Team	Apps	(Points)
- Gala
–	Melrose		
–	Blackheath		
Senior career
Years	Team	Apps	(Points)
2013-17	Edinburgh	4	(0)
2016-18	London Scottish		
2018-19	Yorkshire Carnegie		
2020-22	Glasgow Warriors	4	(0)
Super Rugby
Years	Team	Apps	(Points)
2019–21	Southern Knights		

Ewan McQuillin (born 12 November 1991) is a Scottish rugby union player. He previously played for Glasgow Warriors, Southern Knights, Yorkshire Carnegie, London Scottish and Edinburgh at the tighthead prop position.

== Rugby Union career ==
=== Amateur career ===
McQuillin started with Gala.

McQuillin then moved to Melrose.

McQuillin played for Blackheath in January 2018.

=== Professional career ===
McQuillin was a Scottish Rugby Academy player with Edinburgh Rugby.

McQuillin played for London Scottish.

McQuillin has also played for Yorkshire Carnegie.

McQuillin played for Super 6 side the Southern Knights in the 2019-20 season.

On 10 February 2020 it was announced that McQuillin had signed for Glasgow Warriors on a short term deal. He made his debut for the club on the 22 February 2020 when the Warriors hosted the Dragons in the Pro14. Glasgow won the match 34-19. He has the Glasgow Warrior No. 310.

He was released by Glasgow Warriors at the end of the 2021-22 season.

Sporting positions
Preceded by Finn Russell, Sam Hidalgo-Clyne	John Macphail Scholarship; Ewan McQuillin, Adam Ashe; 2014	Succeeded by Ben Robbins, Callum Hunter-Hill
