= Stuart Hogg =

British Lions & Scotland international rugby union player

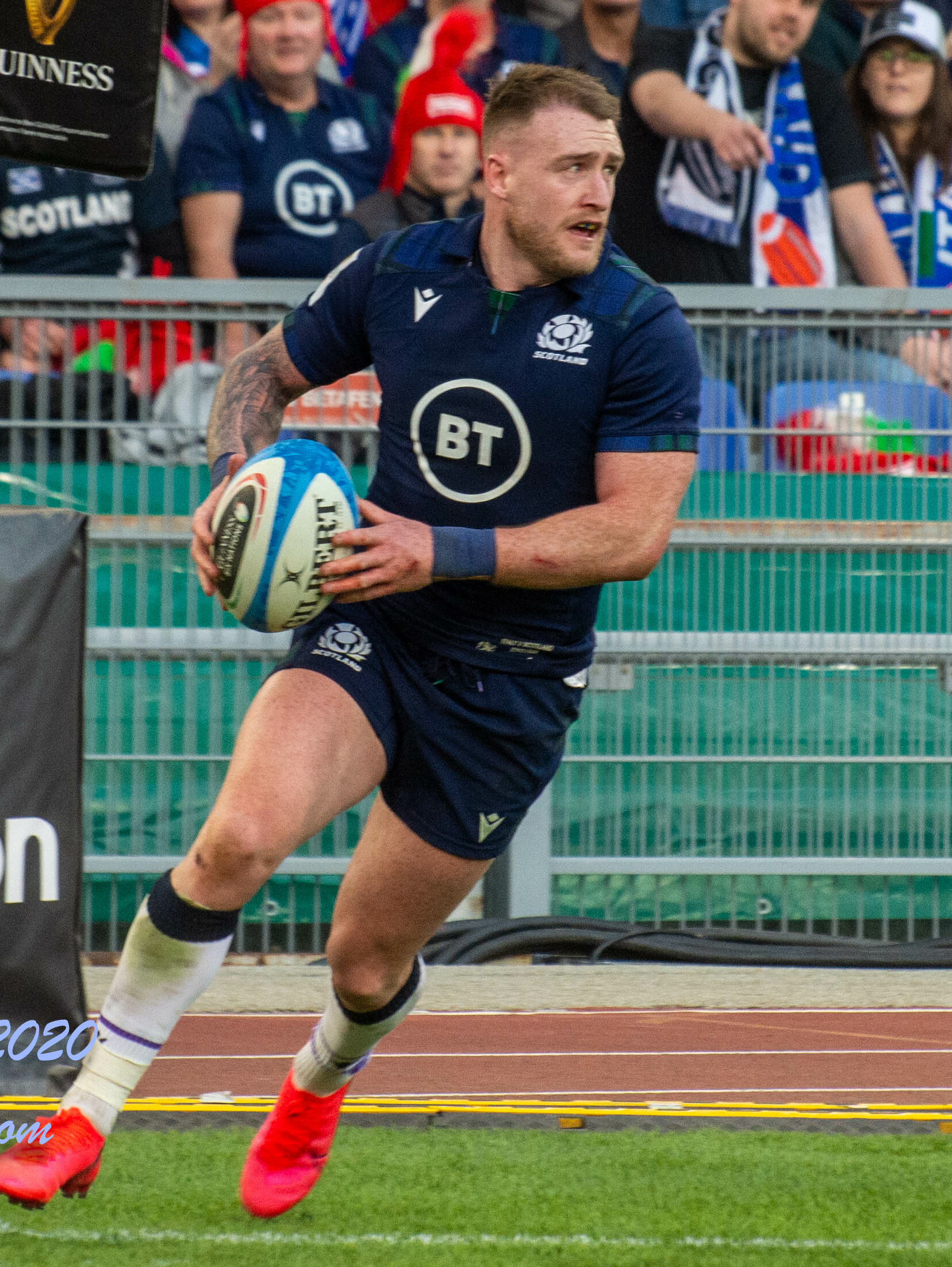
- Hogg in 2020
- Born: Stuart William Hogg; 24 June 1992 (age 34) Melrose, Scotland
- Height: 180 cm (5 ft 11 in)
- Weight: 92 kg (14 st 7 lb)
- School: Hawick High School
- Notable relative: Graham Hogg (brother)

Rugby union career
- Position(s): Fullback, Fly-half
Amateur team(s)
Years	Team	Apps	(Points)
2007–2008	Ayr RFC		
2008–2009	Stirling County RFC		
2010	Hawick RFC		
Senior career
Years	Team	Apps	(Points)
2010–2019	Glasgow Warriors	121	(228)
2019–2023	Exeter Chiefs	69	(104)
2024–	Montpellier	9	(58)
- Correct as of 11 January 2025
International career
Years	Team	Apps	(Points)
2011	Scotland U20	5	(10)
2012–2023	Scotland	100	(171)
2013, 2017, 2021	British & Irish Lions	2	(0)
- Correct as of 19 March 2023
National sevens team
Years	Team		Comps
2014	Scotland		1
- Correct as of 19 March 2023

Stuart William Hogg (born 24 June 1992) is a Scottish professional rugby union player, who plays for Montpellier of the French Top 14.

Hogg played for Glasgow Warriors from 2010 to 2019, joining Exeter Chiefs in 2019 and retiring in 2023. He then joined Montpellier in 2024.

He has represented Scotland at international level, earning 100 caps after making his debut against Wales during the 2012 Six Nations Championship. He was Scotland's all-time leading try-scorer, and was named Six Nations Player of the Tournament in 2016 and 2017. He was selected to tour with the British & Irish Lions three times, in 2013, 2017 and 2021, and won two caps against South Africa in 2021.

In November 2024, Hogg pleaded guilty to domestic abuse of his estranged wife over five years. In 2026, it was announced that he would be stripped of his MBE, awarded in 2024, due to his criminal conviction.

== Early life and education ==
Hogg comes from Hawick in the Scottish Borders. His father John played rugby at full-back for Hawick and refereed. His brother Graham Hogg played for Scotland in the IRB Sevens World Series and at under-18, under-19 and under-20. Hogg is a distant relative of football player George Best.

Hogg was a pupil at Trinity Primary School and Hawick High School.

== Rugby Union career ==
=== Amateur career ===
Hogg played for Hawick Wanderers, Hawick and Heriot's.

Hogg was drafted to Stirling County in the Scottish Premiership for the 2008–09 season.

Hogg was linked to Glasgow Warriors for 18 months as part of the Elite Development Programme run by Scottish Rugby, and signed his first professional contract at the end of 2011.

=== Professional career ===
Hogg first came to prominence when he was named Player of the Year with Scotland under-17s. He later captained Scotland under-18 against Wales having been named man-of-the-match against France in 2010.

==== Glasgow Warriors ====
Hogg made his debut for Glasgow Warriors in the Magners League in February 2011 and that same month was part of the Scotland under-20 team. He went on to earn five caps competing in the under-20 6 Nations and the IRB Junior World Championship in the summer of 2011.

Hogg made two Warriors appearances in season 2010–11 and began the 2011–12 RaboDirect PRO12 campaign as the club's starting full-back. He was named in the Pro12 Dream team at the end of the 2012–13 season. It was announced in November 2014 that Stuart Hogg had signed a two-year contract extension with the Glasgow Warriors, keeping him at the club until at least May 2017. He signed a further contract in 2016 taking him to the end of the 2018/19 season with me. In 2017 Hogg became the youngest player to reach 100 appearances at the age of just 24.

==== Exeter Chiefs ====
In November 2018 it was announced Hogg would be leaving Glasgow Warriors after nine years, and joining Exeter Chiefs after the 2019 RWC.

Hogg become a European and English premiership champion with Exeter Chiefs in 2020, playing an important role in their triumphs over Racing 92 in the European Champions Cup Final and Wasps in the Gallagher Premiership Final.

==== Montpellier ====
Following his announcement in July 2023 of an immediate retirement from the sport, Hogg joined Montpellier in July 2024 signing a two-year contract, and made his competitive debut for the club on September 7, 2024.

=== Scotland national team ===
Hogg has represented Scotland at under-17, under-18, and under-20 level before he went on to gain full international honours.

==== 2012–2014 ====
Hogg gained his first cap for the Scotland national rugby union team after earning a call up to Andy Robinson's 36-man squad for the 2012 Six Nations following a series of impressive performances for Glasgow. Hogg impressed on his debut against Wales in Cardiff, coming on as a substitute following injury to Max Evans. Hogg was subsequently named in the starting line-up for the first time for the match versus France. He scored his first try for Scotland in the 8th minute against France.

In the 2013 Six Nations Hogg scored his second and third international tries against England in round one and in round two he scored against the Italians an intercept try from his 5-metre line and ran 95 metres to score his third international try.

On 8 March 2014, Hogg scored his 4th international try against France at Murrayfield. On 15 March, he was sent off in a Six Nations game against Wales for a late and dangerous hit on Dan Biggar, although originally shown a yellow card by referee Jérôme Garcès the referee then looked at the replays on one of the big screens in the stadium and upgraded his decision to a red card. On 8 June 2014, during Scotland's Summer tour he made his first appearance against the US after his red card against Wales and he marked that game with his 5th International try. On 14 June 2014, he slotted a crucial 43-metre kick to secure a win against Canada at BMO Stadium the final score was 17–19 to Scotland during the Scotland Summer tour. On 20 June 2014, he scored his sixth try for Scotland against Argentina during the Scotland summer tour. Scotland won the game 21–18.

Hogg played a role in Scotland 7s team in the Commonwealth Games in Glasgow at Ibrox Stadium. He scored one try in the competition. During Scotland's Autumn internationals in 2014 he scored two tries, one against Argentina at Murrayfield and one against Tonga at Rugby Park, Kilmarnock.

==== 2015–2019 ====
In a struggling Scotland side in the 2015 Six Nations Championship, Hogg made the most metres (442); beat the most defenders (18); and made the second most carries (63). Defensively, he also made a significant contribution as a cover tackler, particularly against England where he made four last-ditch tackles in the opening quarter of the game.

Domestically it was a successful season for Hogg, with Glasgow Warriors winning their first ever Pro 12 title at Ravenhill in Belfast.

Hogg played in all five of Scotland's matches at the 2015 Rugby World Cup, in which Scotland were eliminated at the quarterfinal stage by Australia.

The 2016 Six Nations Championship again saw Hogg in the thick of the action, scoring tries against France and Ireland, the latter an inspired 55-metre individual effort after collecting a high ball. He was also widely praised for his creativity throughout the tournament, setting up tries against the French and Italy. Following a public vote, Hogg was named as the Six Nations Player of the Championship, the first Scottish player to receive the award.

Hogg had a great 2017 Six Nations Championship scoring two tries against Ireland, he then continued this good form by scoring against France. In the last game of the 2017 Six Nations Championship against Italy he added 3 points with the boot in the 29–0 victory. He received a second successive Player of the Championship award, becoming the second person to achieve this. Stuart Hogg received man of the match against New Zealand 18 November 2017. He is now recognised as one of the best full backs in international rugby. On 25 November 2017, Hogg was injured in the warm up before the game against Australia.

In the 2019 Six Nations Championship, Hogg started Scotland's opening game against Italy and their second round clash with Ireland, however he was taken out just after kicking the ball by Irish flanker Peter O'Mahony. This controversial no arms tackle resulted in a shoulder injury for Hogg and Referee Jerome Garces was widely criticised for not stopping play nor checking the TMO. Hogg subsequently sat out the rest of the championship, adding to Scotland's injury woes.

==== 2020–2023: Team captaincy ====
Hogg was named captain for the 2020 Six Nations Championship, starting against Ireland, England, Italy and France and being set to start against Wales before the worldwide pandemic of COVID-19 halted that match. He scored Scotland's first try of the tournament in the 17–0 victory over Italy, running in from his own half to score in the corner. He also crossed the line against Ireland, but dropped the ball as he went to ground it with his right hand. Upon the resumption of the tournament in the autumn, he led Scotland to their first away victory in Wales for 18 years, kicking a penalty during his side's 14–10 triumph.

Hogg was an ever-present in Scotland's 2021 Six Nations Championship, captaining the side to memorable away victories over England (for the first time since 1983) and France (for the first time since 1999). The campaign also saw Hogg score two tries against Wales and numerous points with the boot against Ireland and Italy.

Hogg's form during the championship saw him heavily tipped to be selected for the British & Irish Lions for a third time, with the 2021 tour to South Africa imminent.

During Scotland's match against Japan at Murrayfield on 20 November 2021, Hogg scored his 25th international try, becoming Scotland's all-time record try scorer.

Hogg captained Scotland for their first back to back win against England in four decades, during the first game of the 2022 6 nations.

On 27 March 2023, Hogg unexpectedly announced his intention to retire from professional rugby after the upcoming Rugby World Cup. He later revised this and announced on 9 July 2023 his immediate retirement from the sport, two month prior to the start of the tournament. In his retirement announcement, he referenced his ambition to take up a new career path beyond retirement.

=== British & Irish Lions ===
Hogg was one of four Scotland players called up for the Lions squad for their 2013 tour to Australia and was the youngest player on the tour.

Hogg was named as one of two Scottish players in the initial squad selected for the 2017 tour to New Zealand in June and July. Hogg was injured after being caught by the elbow of team-mate Conor Murray in an accidental collision during his third appearance of the tour, and left the tour before the start of the Test Matches.

In May 2021 Hogg was selected for a third time on the Lions' 2021 tour to South Africa. After missing three tour matches due to enforced COVID-19 isolation, he was selected at full-back for the first Test match, playing the full 80 minutes as the Lions won 17–22. He also played for the full 80 minutes of the second Test the following week.

=== International tries ===
As of 19 November 2022.

Try	Opposing team	Venue	Competition	Date	Result
1	France	Murrayfield Stadium, Edinburgh	2012 Six Nations	26 February 2012	17 – 23
2	England	Twickenham Stadium, London	2013 Six Nations	2 February 2013	38 – 18
3	Italy	Murrayfield Stadium, Edinburgh	2013 Six Nations	9 February 2013	34 – 10
4	France	Murrayfield Stadium, Edinburgh	2014 Six Nations	8 March 2014	17 – 19
5	United States	BBVA Compass Stadium, Houston		7 June 2014	6 – 24
6	Argentina	Estadio Mario Alberto Kempes, Córdoba		20 June 2014	19 – 21
7	Argentina	Murrayfield Stadium, Edinburgh		8 November 2014	41 – 31
8	Tonga	Rugby Park, Kilmarnock		22 November 2014	37 – 12
9	Wales	Murrayfield Stadium, Edinburgh	2015 Six Nations	15 February 2015	23 – 26
10	France	Murrayfield Stadium, Edinburgh	2016 Six Nations	13 March 2016	29 – 18
11	Ireland	Aviva Stadium, Dublin	2016 Six Nations	19 March 2016	35 – 25
12	Georgia	Rugby Park, Kilmarnock		26 November 2016	43 – 16
13	Georgia	Rugby Park, Kilmarnock		26 November 2016	43 – 16
14	Ireland	Murrayfield Stadium, Edinburgh	2017 Six Nations	4 February 2017	27 – 22
15	Ireland	Murrayfield Stadium, Edinburgh	2017 Six Nations	4 February 2017	27 – 22
16	France	Stade de France, Paris	2017 Six Nations	12 February 2017	22 – 16
17	Samoa	Murrayfield Stadium, Edinburgh		11 November 2017	44 – 38
18	Italy	Stadio Olimpico, Rome	2018 Six Nations	17 March 2018	27 – 29
19	Italy	Murrayfield Stadium, Edinburgh	2019 Six Nations	2 February 2019	33 – 20
20	Italy	Stadio Olimpico, Rome	2020 Six Nations	22 February 2020	0 – 17
21	Wales	Murrayfield Stadium, Edinburgh	2021 Six Nations	13 February 2021	24 – 25
22	Wales	Murrayfield Stadium, Edinburgh	2021 Six Nations	13 February 2021	24 – 25
23	South Africa	Murrayfield Stadium, Edinburgh		13 November 2021	15 – 30
24	South Africa	Murrayfield Stadium, Edinburgh		13 November 2021	15 – 30
25	Japan	Murrayfield Stadium, Edinburgh		20 November 2021	29 – 20
26	Italy	Stadio Olimpico, Rome	2022 Six Nations	12 March 2022	22 – 33
27	Argentina	Murrayfield Stadium, Edinburgh		19 November 2022	52 – 29

== Personal life ==
Hogg was appointed Member of the Order of the British Empire (MBE) in the 2024 New Year Honours for services to rugby union football. In 2026, it was announced that he would be stripped of his MBE due to his criminal conviction.

Hogg's first child was born in late 2015. Hogg married Gillian Smith in August 2016, and became a father for a second time in 2017. In November 2023, Hogg revealed his new relationship to commentator Leonna Mayor, after the birth of his fourth child.

Hogg was arrested outside his estranged wife's Hawick residence on 25 February 2024 for acting in a threatening or abusive manner. After this, he attended a rehabilitation centre. On 4 November 2024, Hogg pleaded guilty to domestic abuse that went on for five years.

In October 2025, Hogg and his ex-wife Gillian were officially divorced. In January 2026, Hogg's relationship with Leonna Mayor also came to an end.

== In popular culture ==
Hogg is briefly mentioned on Pottermore, in an excerpt written by J. K. Rowling for the website, suggesting that he and fellow players Jim Hamilton and Kelly Brown are in fact squibs – wizard-born with no magical powers – masquerading as muggles. In a tweet, J. K. Rowling later insinuated that Hogg was, in fact, a full-fledged Wizard.

== Honours ==
Glasgow Warriors

- Guinness Pro12 Champions: 2014–15

Exeter Chiefs

- Gallagher Premiership Champions: 2019–20
- European Champions Cup Champions: 2019–20

Individual

- RBS Six Nations Player of the Championship: 2016, 2017
