= John Barclay (rugby union) =

Scotland international rugby union player

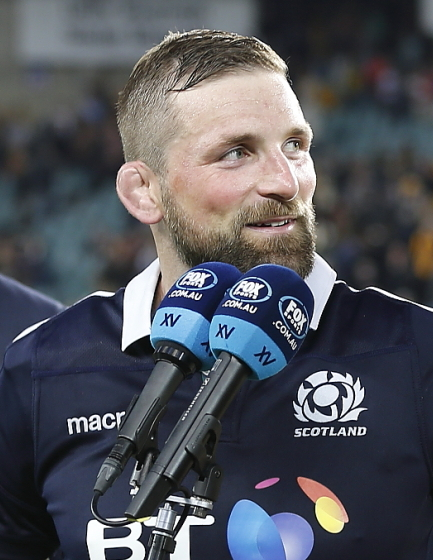
- Barclay in 2017
- Born: John Adam Barclay; 25 September 1986 (age 40) Hong Kong
- Height: 1.90 m (6 ft 3 in)
- Weight: 106 kg (16 st 10 lb; 234 lb)
- School: Dollar Academy

Rugby union career
- Position: Flanker / Number 8
Senior career
Years	Team	Apps	(Points)
2005–2013	Glasgow Warriors	148	(65)
2013–2018	Scarlets	108	(50)
2018–2020	Edinburgh Rugby	5	(5)
- Correct as of 1 October 2023
International career
Years	Team	Apps	(Points)
2007–2019	Scotland	76	(35)
- Correct as of 15 August 2020

John Adam Barclay (born 25 September 1986) is a Scottish former rugby union player, who played as a flanker and number 8. He made 76 international appearances for the Scotland national team 2007–2019, playing at three World Cups. He played club rugby for Glasgow Warriors, Scarlets and Edinburgh Rugby.

== Early life ==
Barclay was born in Hong Kong, where he went to Bradbury School, discovering mini rugby at Stanley Fort RFC.

Barclay later attended Dollar Academy in Scotland, where he captained the school's 1st XV to victory against the High School of Dundee in the Scottish Schools Cup final at Murrayfield in 2004.

== Career ==
Barclay joined Glasgow Warriors as an apprentice in 2004.

After leaving school, while still only 17, he was invited to train with the Scotland squad by then-coach Matt Williams. After Williams' departure Barclay was not picked for the Scotland squad again until the 2007 World Cup after a run of strong performances for club side Glasgow Warriors. He made his debut against New Zealand in the pool stages in a weakened team, losing 40–0.

After the 2007 World Cup Barclay started to become involved with the Scotland squad more and became a permanent starter until the end of the 2011 World Cup.

Barclay was man of the match in Scotland's win over South Africa at Murrayfield in 2010, and became recognised for his skills at the breakdown, and his role in the "Killer Bs" back row (Barclay, Johnnie Beattie and Kelly Brown). He was also selected in the Pro12 Dream Team at the end of the 2009/10 season.

After Scotland's exit at the pool stages of the 2011 World Cup Barclay was dropped for the 2012 6 Nations Championship.

Barclay was picked for Scotland's summer tour to Australia and the Pacific Islands by then Scotland coach Andy Robinson. He played in Scotland's victory over Australia in Newcastle but then returned home for personal reasons, missing out on the following victory over Samoa.

In March 2012 Barclay signed a one-year contract extension, with an option to agree a further year. After overcoming a series of injuries at the start of the 2012–13 season Barclay started most games whilst Chris Fusaro suffered with injury. It was announced in the second half of the season that Glasgow had withdrawn a contract offer and that Barclay would join the Scarlets on a three-year contract for the next season. He helped Glasgow to a third-place finish in the Pro12 and a play-off spot away to Leinster, a game which the Warriors narrowly lost.

Barclay missed Scotland's 2013 summer tour to South Africa due to requiring surgery. He started the 2013–14 season with the Scarlets and was part of the Scotland squad for the 2013 Autumn Internationals, winning a cap against South Africa at Murrayfield on 17 November 2013, when he came on as a substitute on 64 minutes.

Barclay missed inclusion for the 2014 Six Nations squad. Following the appointment of Vern Cotter as Scotland coach, Barclay was not included in any of his squads. However, he was picked in the wider 2015 World Cup training squad and earned his first cap since 2013 in the second warm-up match against Italy in August 2015. Although omitted from the final World Cup squad, Barclay was once again included in the Scotland squad for the 2016 Six Nations Championship and started the first four games at blindside flanker, scoring a try in the win over Italy.

In the opening match of the 2017 Six Nations Championship, Barclay was a second-half substitute in Scotland's victory over Ireland at Murrayfield. He started the following week against France, in a game that saw captain Greig Laidlaw get injured. Barclay assumed the captaincy for the final three games of the championship, which included a win over Wales for the first time in ten years. Scotland ended the campaign with three wins from five.

On 17 November 2017, it was announced that he had signed a two-year contract with Edinburgh Rugby from the start of the 2018–19 season; however, a ruptured Achilles tendon delayed his debut until March 2019.

On 4 December 2019, Barclay announced his retirement from international rugby, after winning 76 caps and playing in 3 World Cups.

On 22 April 2020, Edinburgh's coach confirmed that Barclay's contract would not be renewed. Barclay had played only fourteen matches for Edinburgh due to a combination of injuries and international duties. In June, he spoke of having a desire to continue playing rugby, despite the shutdown from the coronavirus pandemic reducing any prospects of recruitment within club rugby. On 15 August 2020, Barclay announced his retirement from professional rugby. After retiring he is now a pundit.

Sporting positions	John Macphail Scholarship; John Barclay; 2005	Succeeded by Graham Hogg
