= Alloa RFC =

Scottish rugby union club

(Scotland) Alloa RFC
- Full name: Alloa Rugby Football Club
- Union: Scottish Rugby Union
- Founded: 1931; 95 years ago
- Location: Alloa, Scotland
- Ground: Earlsfield
- League: Caledonia Midlands Conference
- 2019–20: Caledonia Midlands Non-League
Team kit

Alloa RFC is a rugby union side based in Alloa, Clackmannanshire, Scotland. The club was founded in 1931 as an offshoot of two other clubs:- Clackmannan County RFC and Alloa Academy F.P.

== History ==
The club is Positive Coaching Scotland accredited.

Their new clubhouse was opened in 2019.

== Notable former players ==
=== Scotland ===
The following former Alloa players went on to represent Scotland.

- (Scotland) Kevin Bryce
- (Scotland) Grant Gilchrist

=== Scotland 7s ===
The following former Alloa players went on to represent Scotland 7s.

- (Scotland) Sean Kennedy

=== North and Midlands ===
The following former Alloa players have represented North and Midlands at provincial level.

- (Scotland) B. Edwards
- (Scotland) J. G. Bryce
- (Scotland) H. J. Edwards

== Alloa Sevens ==
Alloa play host to the Alloa Sevens tournament.

== Honours ==
- Alloa Sevens
  - Champions: 1981
- Stirling University Sevens
  - Champions: 1976
- Cambuslang Sevens
  - Champions: 1983
- Lanarkshire Sevens
  - Champions: 1973
- Waid Academy F.P. Sevens
  - Champions: 1971
- Howe of Fife Sevens
  - Champions: 1985
- Midlands Bowl
  - Champions: 2014-15
- BT National Bowl
  - Champions: 2014-15
- Caledonia Division 2
  - Champions: 2015-16
