= 2021–22 Glasgow Warriors season =

Glasgow Warriors 2021–2022
- Ground: Scotstoun Stadium (Capacity: 7,351)
- Coach: (England) Danny Wilson
- Captain(s): (Scotland) Ryan Wilson (Scotland) Fraser Brown
- Most caps: (Scotland) Ross Thompson (23)
- Top scorer: (Scotland) Ross Thompson (157)
- Most tries: (Scotland) Johnny Matthews (9)
- League: United Rugby Championship
- 8th
| 1st kit | 2nd kit |

The 2021–22 season will see Glasgow Warriors compete in the competitions: the United Rugby Championship and the European Rugby Champions Cup.

== Season overview ==
A new league structure was announced on 15 June 2021. With the addition of the 4 Super Rugby Unlocked franchises of the Bulls, Sharks, Stormers and the Lions, the Pro14 rebranded itself as the United Rugby Championship.

There will be 4 regional conferences with teams playing their regional rivals home and away; and teams from the other conferences either home or away.

With 16 teams in total, this means 18 normal matches in the season before the play-offs.

As Scotland and Italy only have 2 teams each in the United Rugby Championship, they were placed in one regional conference; the Irish sides, Welsh sides and South African sides had their own regional conferences respectively.

== Team ==
=== Coaches ===
- Head coach: (England) Danny Wilson
- Assistant coach: (Scotland) Kenny Murray (to January 2022)
- Assistant coach: (Scotland) Peter Murchie
- Assistant coach: (Ireland) Nigel Carolan
- Scrum Coach: (Scotland) Alasdair Dickinson
- Head Strength and Conditioning Coach: (Ireland) Cillian Reardon
- Senior Athletic Performance Coach: Damien O'Donoghue
- Sport Scientist: Robin Reidy
- Lead Performance Analyst: Greg Woolard
- Asst. Performance Analyst: Graham O'Riordan
- Asst. Performance Analyst: Eilidh Wright

=== Staff ===
- Managing Director: Alastair Kellock
- Chairman: Charles Shaw
- Advisory Group: Walter Malcolm, Douglas McCrea, Alan Lees, Jim Preston, Paul Taylor
- Rugby Operations Manager: Kenny Brown (to November 2021); John Manson (from November 2021)
- Assistant Operations Manager: Martin Malone
- Kit & Equipment Manager: Dougie Mills
- Head groundsman: Colin Mackinnon
- Team Doctor: Dr. Jonathan Hanson
- Clinical Manager and Lead Physiotherapist: Andrew Boag
- Senior Team Physiotherapist: Francesco Fronzoni
- Senior Team Physiotherapist: Michael Clark
- Junior Physiotherapist: Christina Finlay
- Communications and Marketing Manager: Cameron MacAllister
- Marketing manager: Claire Scott
- Media manager: Duncan Seller
- Content Producer: Cameron Avery
- Communications Manager: Craig Wright
- Commercial Manager: Jamie Robertson
- Partnership Account Manager: Catherine Bunch
- Partnership Account Manager: Jim Taylor
- Community Manager: Stuart Lewis

=== Squad ===
| Hookers (Scotland) Ewan Ashman (Scotland) Fraser Brown (Scotland) Johnny Matthews (Scotland) Grant Stewart (Scotland) George Turner Props (Scotland) Simon Berghan (Scotland) Jamie Bhatti (Scotland) Zander Fagerson (Scotland) Oli Kebble (Scotland) Tom Lambert (South Africa) Nathan McBeth (Scotland) Murray McCallum (Scotland) Ewan McQuillin (Argentina) Enrique Pieretto (Wales) Brad Thyer (Scotland) Murphy Walker Locks (Scotland) Hamish Bain (England) Lewis Bean (Scotland) Scott Cummings (Scotland) Richie Gray (Scotland) Kiran McDonald | Loose forwards (Scotland) Rory Darge (Australia) Jack Dempsey (Scotland) Matt Fagerson (Scotland) Thomas Gordon (Scotland) Rob Harley (Scotland) Ally Miller (Scotland) Ryan Wilson Scrum halves (Scotland) Jamie Dobie (Scotland) George Horne (Scotland) Sean Kennedy (Scotland) Ali Price Fly halves (Argentina) Domingo Miotti (Scotland) Ross Thompson (Scotland) Duncan Weir | Centres (Scotland) Robbie Fergusson (Scotland) Nick Grigg (Scotland) Peter Horne (New Zealand) Tom Jordan (Scotland) Sam Johnson (Scotland) Stafford McDowall (Scotland) Ollie Smith (Scotland) Kyle Steyn (Scotland) Sione Tuipulotu Back Three (Argentina) Sebastián Cancelliere (Tonga) Walter Fifita (New Zealand) Cole Forbes (New Zealand) Josh McKay (Scotland) Rufus McLean (Australia) Ratu Tagive |

==== Scottish Rugby Academy Stage 3 players ====
These players are given a professional contract by the Scottish Rugby Academy. Although given placements they are not contracted by Glasgow Warriors. Players graduate from the academy when a professional club contract is offered.

These players are assigned to Glasgow Warriors for the season 2021–22.

Academy players promoted in the course of the season are listed with the main squad.

- (Scotland) Jamie Drummond – Hooker
- (Scotland) Angus Fraser – Hooker
- (Scotland) Euan Ferrie – Lock
- (Scotland) Alex Samuel – Lock
- (Scotland) Max Williamson – Lock
- (Scotland) Gregor Brown – Flanker
- (Scotland) Rory Jackson – Flanker
- (Scotland) Rhys Tait – Flanker
- (Scotland) Euan Cunningham – Fly-half
- (Scotland) Christian Townsend – Fly-half
- (Scotland) Michael Gray – Centre
- (Scotland) Robbie McCallum – Centre
- (Scotland) Finlay Callaghan – Wing
- (Scotland) Ross McKnight – Wing

==== Back up players ====
Other players used by Glasgow Warriors over the course of the season.

- (Scotland) Calvin Henderson (Ayrshire Bulls) – Prop
- (Scotland) Michael Scott (Ayrshire Bulls) – Prop
- (Scotland) George Thornton (Ayrshire Bulls) – Prop
- (Ireland) Lewis McNamara (Ayrshire Bulls) – Flanker
- (Australia) Jordan Lenac (Ayrshire Bulls) – Scrum half
- (Scotland) Euan McAra (Ayrshire Bulls) – Scrum half
- (Scotland) Robert Beattie (Ayrshire Bulls) – Centre
- (England) Eli Caven (Ayrshire Bulls) – Wing
- (Scotland) Aaron Tait (Ayrshire Bulls) – Wing
- (Australia) Liam McNamara (Ayrshire Bulls) – Full back
- (Scotland) Jerry Blyth-Lafferty (Boroughmuir Bears) – Hooker
- (Scotland) Callum Smith (Boroughmuir Bears) – Prop
- (Scotland) Jack Fisher (Boroughmuir Bears) – Lock
- (Scotland) Trystan Andrews (Boroughmuir Bears) – No. 8
- (New Zealand) Ruairidh Swan (Boroughmuir Bears) – Scrum half
- (Scotland) George Breese (Stirling County) – Prop
- (Scotland) Adam Sinclair (Stirling County) – Lock
- (Scotland) Connor Gordon (Stirling County) – Flanker
- (New Zealand) Benedict Grant (Stirling County) – No. 8
- (Cyprus) Marcus Holden (Stirling County) – Fly half
- (Scotland) Logan Trotter (Stirling County) – Wing
- (Scotland) Stevie Hamilton (Stirling County) – Full back

== Player statistics ==
During the 2021–22 season, Glasgow have used 47 different players in competitive games. The table below shows the number of appearances and points scored by each player.

| Pos. | Nation | Name | United Rugby Championship | | | Champions Cup | | | Challenge Cup | | | Total | |
| Pos. | Nation | Name | Apps (sub) | Tries | Points kicked | Apps (sub) | Tries | Points kicked | Apps (sub) | Tries | Points kicked | Apps (sub) | Total Pts |
|---|---|---|---|---|---|---|---|---|---|---|---|---|---|
| HK | (Scotland) | Fraser Brown | 6(6) | 3 | 0 | 1(1) | 0 | 0 | 0 | 0 | 0 | 7(7) | 15 |
| HK | (Scotland) | Johnny Matthews | 7(8) | 7 | 0 | (2) | 1 | 0 | 2 | 1 | 0 | 9(10) | 45 |
| HK | (Scotland) | Grant Stewart | (2) | 0 | 0 | 0 | 0 | 0 | 0 | 0 | 0 | (2) | 0 |
| HK | (Scotland) | George Turner | 6(3) | 0 | 0 | 3(1) | 0 | 0 | (2) | 0 | 0 | 9(6) | 0 |
| PR | (Scotland) | Simon Berghan | 5(5) | 0 | 0 | (1) | 0 | 0 | 1(1) | 0 | 0 | 6(7) | 0 |
| PR | (Scotland) | Jamie Bhatti | 10(4) | 2 | 0 | 2(2) | 0 | 0 | 1(1) | 0 | 0 | 13(7) | 10 |
| PR | (Scotland) | Zander Fagerson | 8 | 1 | 0 | 4 | 0 | 0 | 1(1) | 0 | 0 | 13(1) | 5 |
| PR | (Scotland) | Oli Kebble | 9(5) | 1 | 0 | 2(2) | 0 | 0 | 1 | 0 | 0 | 12(7) | 5 |
| PR | (South Africa) | Nathan McBeth | (5) | 0 | 0 | 0 | 0 | 0 | (1) | 0 | 0 | (6) | 0 |
| PR | (Scotland) | Murray McCallum | 2(2) | 0 | 0 | 0 | 0 | 0 | 0 | 0 | 0 | 2(2) | 0 |
| PR | (Scotland) | Ewan McQuillin | (2) | 0 | 0 | 0 | 0 | 0 | 0 | 0 | 0 | (2) | 0 |
| PR | (Argentina) | Enrique Pieretto | 1(7) | 0 | 0 | (3) | 0 | 0 | 0 | 0 | 0 | 1(10) | 0 |
| PR | (Wales) | Brad Thyer | 1(3) | 0 | 0 | 0 | 0 | 0 | 0 | 0 | 0 | 1(3) | 0 |
| PR | (Scotland) | Murphy Walker | 2(4) | 0 | 0 | 0 | 0 | 0 | 0 | 0 | 0 | 2(4) | 0 |
| LK | (England) | Lewis Bean | 2(8) | 2 | 0 | (2) | 0 | 0 | (1) | 0 | 0 | 2(11) | 10 |
| LK | (Scotland) | Scott Cummings | 7 | 1 | 0 | 4 | 0 | 0 | 1 | 0 | 0 | 12 | 5 |
| LK | (Scotland) | Richie Gray | 16(1) | 0 | 0 | 3 | 0 | 0 | 2 | 0 | 0 | 21(1) | 0 |
| LK | (Scotland) | Kiran McDonald | 5(9) | 0 | 0 | 1(2) | 1 | 0 | (1) | 0 | 0 | 6(12) | 5 |
| BR | (Scotland) | Gregor Brown | 1(1) | 0 | 0 | 0 | 0 | 0 | (1) | 0 | 0 | 1(2) | 0 |
| BR | (Scotland) | Rory Darge | 11 | 1 | 0 | 4 | 0 | 0 | 1 | 0 | 0 | 16 | 5 |
| BR | (Australia) | Jack Dempsey | 17 | 5 | 0 | 4 | 0 | 0 | 1 | 0 | 0 | 22 | 25 |
| BR | (Scotland) | Matt Fagerson | 2(2) | 0 | 0 | 4 | 1 | 0 | 0 | 0 | 0 | 6(2) | 5 |
| BR | (Scotland) | Thomas Gordon | 6(7) | 2 | 0 | (1) | 0 | 0 | 1 | 0 | 0 | 7(8) | 10 |
| BR | (Scotland) | Rob Harley | 8(3) | 0 | 0 | (2) | 0 | 0 | 1(1) | 0 | 0 | 9(3) | 0 |
| BR | (Scotland) | Ally Miller | 3(7) | 0 | 0 | (1) | 0 | 0 | 1(1) | 0 | 0 | 4(9) | 0 |
| BR | (Scotland) | Ryan Wilson | 17 | 2 | 0 | (2) | 0 | 0 | 2 | 0 | 0 | 19(2) | 10 |
| SH | (Scotland) | Jamie Dobie | 4(12) | 2 | 0 | 0 | 0 | 0 | (1) | 0 | 0 | 4(13) | 10 |
| SH | (Scotland) | George Horne | 7(3) | 2 | 0 | (4) | 0 | 0 | 0 | 0 | 0 | 7(7) | 10 |
| SH | (Scotland) | Sean Kennedy | (2) | 0 | 0 | 0 | 0 | 0 | 0 | 0 | 0 | (2) | 0 |
| SH | (Australia) | Jordan Lenac | (2) | 0 | 0 | 0 | 0 | 0 | 0 | 0 | 0 | (2) | 0 |
| SH | (Scotland) | Ali Price | 8 | 1 | 0 | 4 | 0 | 0 | 2 | 0 | 0 | 14 | 5 |
| FH | (Argentina) | Domingo Miotti | 2(3) | 0 | 3 | 0 | 0 | 0 | (1) | 0 | 0 | 2(4) | 3 |
| FH | (Scotland) | Ross Thompson | 11(6) | 1 | 94 | 4 | 0 | 41 | 2 | 0 | 17 | 17(6) | 157 |
| FH | (Scotland) | Duncan Weir | 8(6) | 0 | 47 | (3) | 0 | 4 | 0 | 0 | 0 | 8(9) | 51 |
| CE | (Scotland) | Robbie Fergusson | 2(1) | 0 | 0 | 0 | 0 | 0 | 0 | 0 | 0 | 2(1) | 0 |
| CE | (Scotland) | Nick Grigg | 2(2) | 0 | 0 | 0 | 0 | 0 | 0 | 0 | 0 | 2(2) | 0 |
| CE | (Scotland) | Peter Horne | (1) | 0 | 0 | 0 | 0 | 0 | 0 | 0 | 0 | (1) | 0 |
| CE | (Scotland) | Sam Johnson | 13(1) | 1 | 0 | 4 | 0 | 0 | 2 | 0 | 0 | 19(1) | 5 |
| CE | (Scotland) | Stafford McDowall | 3(7) | 0 | 0 | 0 | 0 | 0 | 0 | 0 | 0 | 3(7) | 0 |
| CE | (Scotland) | Sione Tuipulotu | 12(2) | 4 | 0 | 4 | 0 | 0 | 2 | 0 | 0 | 18(2) | 20 |
| WG | (Argentina) | Sebastián Cancelliere | 7 | 1 | 0 | (1) | 0 | 0 | 1 | 0 | 0 | 8(1) | 5 |
| WG | (Tonga) | Walter Fifita | 1(1) | 0 | 0 | 0 | 0 | 0 | 0 | 0 | 0 | 1(1) | 0 |
| WG | (New Zealand) | Cole Forbes | 12(2) | 3 | 0 | 3 | 0 | 0 | 1 | 1 | 0 | 16(2) | 20 |
| WG | (Scotland) | Rufus McLean | 11 | 2 | 0 | 1 | 0 | 0 | 0 | 0 | 0 | 12 | 10 |
| WG | (Scotland) | Kyle Steyn | 13 | 3 | 0 | 4 | 1 | 0 | 1 | 2 | 0 | 18 | 30 |
| FB | (New Zealand) | Josh McKay | 9 | 2 | 0 | 4 | 1 | 0 | 2 | 2 | 0 | 15 | 25 |
| FB | (Scotland) | Ollie Smith | 8(2) | 3 | 0 | (1) | 2 | 2 | 1 | 0 | 0 | 9(3) | 27 |

== Staff movements ==
=== Coaches ===
==== Personnel in ====
- (Scotland) Alasdair Dickinson from (England) Bristol Bears
- (Ireland) Nigel Carolan from (Ireland) Connacht

==== Personnel out ====
- (Ireland) Jonny Bell to (England) Worcester Warriors
- Kenny Murray to Scotland U20s

=== Staff ===
==== Personnel in ====
- (Scotland) John Manson from (United States) Old Glory DC

== Player movements ==
=== Academy promotions ===
- (Scotland) Murphy Walker from Scottish Rugby Academy

=== Player transfers ===
==== In ====
- (Scotland) Duncan Weir from (England) Worcester Warriors
- (Scotland) Jamie Bhatti from (England) Bath
- (Scotland) Simon Berghan from (Scotland) Edinburgh
- (England) Lewis Bean from (England) Northampton Saints
- (Australia) Jack Dempsey from (Australia) Waratahs
- (New Zealand) Josh McKay from (New Zealand) Crusaders
- (Scotland) Sione Tuipulotu from (Japan) Yamaha Júbilo
- (Scotland) Ally Miller from (Scotland) Edinburgh
- (Argentina) Domingo Miotti from (Australia) Western Force
- (Argentina) Sebastián Cancelliere from (Argentina) Jaguares
- (Scotland) Murray McCallum from (Scotland) Edinburgh
- (Wales) Brad Thyer from (Wales) Cardiff Rugby (loan)
- (Scotland) Robbie Fergusson from (United Kingdom) GB 7s
- (Tonga) Walter Fifita from (New Zealand) North Harbour
- (South Africa) Nathan McBeth from (South Africa) Lions
- (New Zealand) Tom Jordan from (Scotland) Ayrshire Bulls
- (Scotland) Ewan Ashman from (England) Sale Sharks (loan)

==== Out ====
- (Scotland) Adam Hastings to (England) Gloucester
- (Scotland) Huw Jones to (England) Harlequins
- (Scotland) Chris Fusaro retired
- (Scotland) Alex Allan to Hong Kong Scottish
- (Fiji) Nikola Matawalu to (France) Montauban
- (Scotland) D'Arcy Rae to (England) Bath
- (Tonga) Fotu Lokotui to (France) Agen
- (Fiji) Mesu Dolokoto to (Fiji) Fijian Drua
- (Samoa) TJ Ioane to (France) Union Sportive Bressane
- (Scotland) Lee Jones released
- (Ireland) Ian Keatley released
- (Scotland) Paddy Kelly released
- (Scotland) Robbie Nairn to (Scotland) Ayrshire Bulls
- (New Zealand) Aki Seiuli to (Wales) Dragons
- (Scotland) George Thornton to (Scotland) Ayrshire Bulls
- (Wales) Brad Thyer to (Wales) Cardiff Rugby (loan ends)
- (Scotland) Ewan Ashman to (England) Sale Sharks (loan ends)
- (Scotland) Murray McCallum to (England) Worcester Warriors
- (Scotland) Peter Horne to (Scotland) Ayrshire Bulls (as Head Coach)
- (Scotland) Nick Grigg to (Japan) Red Hurricanes Osaka
- (Scotland) Jamie Dobie to (Scotland) Bay of Plenty Steamers (loan)

== Competitions ==
=== Pre-season and friendlies ===
The first of two friendlies was confirmed to be against Worcester Warriors. A second friendly, to be played a week before the Worcester match, was confirmed to be against the Newcastle Falcons at Scotstoun Stadium.

The side named to play against Newcastle Falcons was affected by several of the Glasgow players being in isolation due to the coronavirus pandemic; and Super 6 players and academy players were drafted into the Warriors line-up.

In the match against Newcastle Falcons, both Ratu Tagive and Kiran McDonald received injuries which will keep them out of action for months. After a collision with Newcastle fullback Mike Brown, Tagive broke his cheekbone, requiring surgery. McDonald took a blow to his kidney in the match.

A 'Clash of the Warriors' cup was specially produced for the match with Worcester Warriors. It is intended that a return match at Scotstoun will also play for the cup in the following pre-season.

Head Coach Danny Wilson was pleased with the two friendly outings; and especially the Worcester win. He stated after the 'Clash of the Warriors':

Last week wasn’t about winning, it was about the first hit out and getting the lads playing some rugby, but tonight was about coming here to get an away win because our next game will be about winning away so we came here to do that. There were a couple of sticky moments in the first half when they were attacking well and the whole game was very physical, but in the second half in particular some guys took their opportunities so we have some headaches ahead of the first selection. It is a case of small stepping stones in pre-season, but getting everybody out there playing and no major injuries is good – but we won’t read too much into it. Still, when you set out your stall to play hard and get a win, not just giving people a game, then it is good to get a win and the players will get some confidence because of that.

A Super6 pro-alignment fixture was announced for 18 June 2022. Players from Ayrshire Bulls, Stirling County and Boroughmuir Bears will represent Glasgow Warriors. Players from Watsonians, Heriot's Rugby and Southern Knights will represent Edinburgh. The Warriors team was mixed with current Academy prospects like Jamie Drummond, Rory Jackson and Michael Gray, alongside ex-Warriors like Robert Beattie and the previous Academy player Logan Trotter; the Australian 7s international player Liam McNamara and the Cyprus international player Marcus Holden. The Edinburgh side had breakthrough Edinburgh players Kwagga van Niekerk and Harrison Courtney, ex-Edinburgh players like Jason Baggott and Cameron Fenton (Fenton has also played for Glasgow Warriors); alongside the Wales international 7s player Joe Jenkins and the Scotland international 7s player Nyle Godsmark; and former London Irish player Rory Brand.

==== Match 1 ====
3 September 2021
7pm

| Glasgow Warriors (Scotland) | 7–12 | (England) Newcastle Falcons |
| Try: Duncan Weir; Con: Duncan Weir | Preview; Report; Report; Report | Try: Callum Chick; George Wacokecoke; Con: Will Haydon-Wood |

Scotstoun Stadium
Attendance: 3464
Referee: Hollie Davidson (SRU)

Glasgow Warriors: Ollie Smith (Cole Forbes 51); Rufus McLean (Finlay Callaghan 61), Sione Tuipulotu (Nick Grigg 61), Stafford McDowall (Pete Horne 51), Ratu Tagive (Logan Trotter 41); Duncan Weir (Ross Thompson 51), Sean Kennedy (Jamie Dobie 51); Tom Lambert (George Thornton 51), Johnny Matthews (Grant Stewart 51), Murray McCallum (Murphy Walker 51), Lewis Bean (Max Williamson 51), Richie Gray (Rob Harley 51), Kiran McDonald (Scott Cummings 51), Rory Darge (Tom Gordon 51), Ryan Wilson (Rory Jackson 51)
Newcastle Falcons: 15 Mike Brown, 14 Ollie Lindsay-Hague, 13 George Wacokecoke, 12 Pete Lucock, 11 Iwan Stephens, 10 Brett Connon, 9 Sam Stuart; 1 Adam Brocklebank, 2 George McGuigan, 3 Mark Tampin, 4 Marco Fuser, 5 Philip van der Walt, 6 Josh Basham, 7 Will Welch, 8 Callum Chick
Replacements: 16 Robbie Smith, 17 Kyle Cooper, 18 Conor Kenny, 19 Matthew Dalton, 20 Carl Fearns, 21 James Blackett, 22 Will Haydon-Wood, 23 Ben Stevenson, [blank shirts]: Mark Dormer, Oscar Caudle, George Merrick, Freddie Lockwood, Marcus Tiffen, Ewan Greenlaw, Louie Johnson (all used)

==== Match 2 - Warriors Cup ====
10 September 2021
7pm

| Worcester Warriors (England) | 22–27 | (Scotland) Glasgow Warriors |
| Try: Willi Heinz; Ollie Lawrence; Melani Nanai; Con: Owen Williams x 2 Pen: Billy Searle | Preview; Report; Report; Report | Try: Rufus McLean x 2 Lewis Bean; Con: Ross Thompson x 2 Duncan Weir; Pen: Ross Thompson; Duncan Weir |

Sixways Stadium
Attendance: 3,751
Referee: Adam Leal (RFU)

Worcester Warriors: 1 Ethan Waller, 2 Scott Baldwin, 3 Christian Judge, 4 Matt Garvey, 5 Justin Clegg, 6 Ted Hill (CC), 7 Sam Lewis, 8 Kyle Hatherell, 9 Willi Heinz (CC), 10 Owen Williams, 11 Harri Doel, 12 Francois Venter, 13 Ollie Lawrence, 14 Noah Heward, 15 Melani Nanai
Replacements: Niall Annett, Lewis Holsey, Jay Tyack, Graham Kitchener, James Scott, Morgan Monks, Caleb Montgomery, Matt Kvesic, Will Chudley, Billy Searle, Tom Howe, Ashley Beck, Oli Morris, Perry Humphreys, Jamie Shillcock [all used – except James Scott & Tom Howe]
Glasgow Warriors: 1. Tom Lambert, 2. Johnny Matthews, 3. Simon Berghan, 4. Lewis Bean, 5. Richie Gray,6. Scott Cummings, 7. Rory Darge, 8. Ryan Wilson (Captain), 9. George Horne, 10. Ross Thompson, 11. Cole Forbes, 12. Sam Johnson, 13. Sione Tuipulotu, 14. Rufus McLean, 15. Stafford McDowall
Replacements: Grant Stewart, Brad Thyer, Murray McCallum, Murphy Walker, Rob Harley, Max Williamson, Rory Jackson, Thomas Gordon, Jack Dempsey, Jamie Dobie, Duncan Weir, Pete Horne, Nick Grigg, Ollie Smith, Finlay Callaghan

==== Match 3 ====
18 June 2022
1.30pm

| Glasgow Warriors (Scotland) | 24 - 26 | (Scotland) Edinburgh |
| Try: Marcus Holden; Jerry Blyth-Lafferty; Ruairidh Swan; Logan Trotter; Con: Marcus Holden x 2 | Preview; Report; Report | Try: Wallace Nelson; Billy Wara; Nyle Godsmark; Jason Baggott; Con: Jason Baggott x 3 |

Millbrae
Referee: Hollie Davidson

Glasgow Warriors: 1. George Bresse, 2. Jerry Blyth-Lafferty, 3. Michael Scott, 4. Rory Jackson, 5. Adam Sinclair, 6. Lewis McNamara, 7. Connor Gordon [Co-captain], 8. Benedict Grant, 9. Ruairidh Swan, 10. Marcus Holden [Co-captain], 11. Aaron Tait, 12. Robert Beattie, 13. Michael Gray, 14. Elias Caven, 15. Logan Trotter
Replacements: 16. Jamie Drummond, 17. Callum Smith, 18. Calvin Henderson, 19. Jack Fisher, 20. Trystan Andrews, 21. Euan McAra, 22. Liam McNamara, 23. Stevie Hamilton
Edinburgh: 1. Harrison Courtney, 2. Michael Liness [Captain], 3. A. P. McWilliam, 4. Josh King, 5. Fraser Hastie, 6. Kwagga Van Niekerk, 7. Wallace Nelson, 8. Karl Main, 9. Rory Brand, 10. Jason Baggott, 11. Aiden Cross, 12. Dom Croetzer [Vice-Captain], 13. Nyle Godsmark, 14. Bill Wara, 15. Joe Jenkins
Replacements: 16. Cameron Fenton, 17. Chris Keen, 18. Martin McGinley 19. Scott McGinley, 20. Gregor Nelson, 21. Jed Gelderbloom, 22. Greg Cannie, 23. Robbie Chalmers

=== United Rugby Championship ===
The season's opener was away to Ulster. It was a match the Warriors could have won scoring 4 tries – but unfortunately they conceded 5 tries. There were some positives; 2 bonus points were earned and Rory Darge secured the man of the match. Darge's performance prompted Jack Dempsey to compare his work-rate with that of Australian captain Michael Hooper. The home match against Sharks saw the Warriors quickly secure a bonus point in the first half. Scoring a quick try in the second half, the Warriors game seemed to lose a gear after Sione Tuipulotu ran in for what would have been a sixth try, but the referee Ben Whitehouse chalked it off for obstruction. This let the South African side regroup somewhat and at the end of the match the Sharks had scored 3 tries; which was an otherwise comfortable game for the Glasgow giants. Glasgow Assistant Coach Peter Murchie was delighted with Glasgow's play up until the Warriors eased off: "I thought we were excellent for the first 50 minutes – we scored some fantastic tries and that’s probably some of the best rugby we’ve played since I’ve been here as a coach." Darge received another man of the match award against the Lions. The Lions proved toothless with no clean breaks in the match but the kicking of EW Viljoen kept the South African side in contention. Danny Wilson said: "We played so well in the first half and created so much, but it was a little bit forced with the offloads. We were trying to force the issue when we should have been more patient. In the second half, the weather came in and there were more scrums. We didn’t want that, because we knew the scrum was a really powerful weapon for them."

==== League table ====
2021–22 United Rugby Championship Table
| | Team | P | W | D | L | PF | PA | PD | TF | TA | Try bonus | Losing bonus | Pts |
| 1 | (Ireland) Leinster | 18 | 13 | 0 | 5 | 546 | 276 | +270 | 73 | 31 | 11 | 4 | 67 |
| 2 | (South Africa) Stormers (CH) | 18 | 12 | 2 | 4 | 464 | 311 | +153 | 60 | 36 | 7 | 2 | 61 |
| 3 | (Ireland) Ulster | 18 | 12 | 0 | 6 | 412 | 297 | +115 | 52 | 34 | 7 | 4 | 59 |
| 4 | (South Africa) Bulls (RU) | 18 | 11 | 0 | 7 | 518 | 388 | +130 | 67 | 42 | 10 | 4 | 58 |
| 5 | (South Africa) Sharks | 18 | 11 | 1 | 6 | 510 | 365 | +145 | 60 | 43 | 9 | 2 | 57 |
| 6 | (Ireland) Munster | 18 | 11 | 0 | 7 | 524 | 341 | +183 | 66 | 34 | 8 | 4 | 56 |
| 7 | (Scotland) Edinburgh | 18 | 10 | 1 | 7 | 421 | 318 | +103 | 56 | 37 | 8 | 4 | 54 |
| 8 | (Scotland) Glasgow Warriors | 18 | 10 | 0 | 8 | 409 | 376 | +33 | 53 | 44 | 7 | 3 | 50 |
| 9 | (Wales) Ospreys | 18 | 10 | 0 | 8 | 422 | 474 | –52 | 46 | 62 | 4 | 2 | 46 |
| 10 | (Wales) Scarlets | 18 | 8 | 0 | 10 | 494 | 534 | –40 | 65 | 73 | 10 | 3 | 45 |
| 11 | (Ireland) Connacht | 18 | 9 | 0 | 9 | 399 | 502 | –103 | 51 | 67 | 4 | 1 | 41 |
| 12 | (South Africa) Lions | 18 | 8 | 0 | 10 | 408 | 450 | –42 | 48 | 55 | 7 | 2 | 41 |
| 13 | (Italy) Benetton | 18 | 6 | 1 | 11 | 425 | 501 | –76 | 53 | 67 | 6 | 3 | 35 |
| 14 | (Wales) Cardiff | 18 | 7 | 0 | 11 | 369 | 577 | –208 | 41 | 72 | 3 | 1 | 32 |
| 15 | (Wales) Dragons | 18 | 2 | 1 | 15 | 305 | 547 | –242 | 36 | 71 | 3 | 6 | 19 |
| 16 | (Italy) Zebre Parma | 18 | 1 | 0 | 17 | 261 | 630 | –369 | 32 | 90 | 2 | 3 | 9 |
If teams are level at any stage, tiebreakers are applied in the following order: 1. number of matches won; 2. number of matches drawn; 3. the difference between points for and points against; 4. the number of tries scored; 5. the most points scored; 6. the difference between tries for and tries against; 7. the fewest red cards received; 8. the fewest yellow cards received.
Green background indicates teams that are playoff places that top their regional pools and earn a place in the 2022–23 European Champions Cup Blue background indicates teams that did not top their regional pool but are in play-off places and earn a place in the 2022–23 European Champions Cup; Pink background indicates teams that did not top their regional pool or earn a place in the 2022–23 European Champions Cup, but are in play-off places. Yellow background indicates teams that top their regional pool and earn a place in the 2022–23 European Champions Cup, but are not in a play-off place Plain background indicates teams that earn a place in the 2022–23 European Challenge Cup. (q) : qualified for the play-offs; (S) : winner of the Regional Shield and qualified for the 2022–23 European Rugby Champions Cup; (e) : qualified for the 2022–23 European Challenge Cup

==== Results ====
===== Round 1 =====
24 September 2021
7.35pm

| (1BP) Ulster (Ireland) | 35–29 | (Scotland) Glasgow Warriors (2BP) |
| Try: Penalty try Bradley Roberts; Marty Moore; Nick Timoney; Nathan Doak; Con: John Cooney; Nathan Doak x 3 | Preview; Report; Report; Report | Try: George Horne; Johnny Matthews; Penalty try Jamie Dobie; Con: Ross Thompson x 2 Pen: Duncan Weir |

Kingspan Stadium
Attendance: 10,000
Referee: Ben Whitehouse (WRU)

===== Round 2 =====
2 October 2021
3.05pm

| (1BP) Glasgow Warriors (Scotland) | 35–24 | (South Africa) Sharks |
| Try: Ross Thompson; Ryan Wilson; Jamie Bhatti; Cole Forbes x 2 Con: Ross Thompson x 5 | Preview; Report; Report; Report | Try: Le Roux Roets; Thomas du Toit; Khutha Mchunu; Con: Curwin Bosch x 2 Ruan Pienaar; Pen: Curwin Bosch |

Scotstoun Stadium
Attendance: 6,449
Referee: Ben Whitehouse (WRU)

===== Round 3 =====
9 October 2021
3.05pm

| Glasgow Warriors (Scotland) | 13–9 | (South Africa) Lions |
| Try: Jamie Bhatti; Con: Ross Thompson; Pen: Ross Thompson x 2 | Preview; Report; Report; Report | Pen: EW Viljoen x 3 |

Scotstoun Stadium
Attendance: 6,096
Referee: Gianluca Gnecchi (FIR)

===== Round 4 =====
16 October 2021
1pm

| Zebre (Italy) | 6–17 | (Scotland) Glasgow Warriors |
| Pen: Carlo Canna x 2 | Preview; Report; Report; Report | Try: Lewis Bean; Sione Tuipulotu; Con: Duncan Weir x 2 Pen: Duncan Weir |

Stadio Lanfranchi
Attendance: 1,300
Referee: Andrew Brace (IRFU)

===== Round 5 =====
22 October 2021
7.35pm

| Glasgow Warriors (Scotland) | 15–31 | (Ireland) Leinster (1 BP) |
| Try: Jack Dempsey; Lewis Bean; Con: Ross Thompson; Pen: Ross Thompson | Preview; Report; Report; Report | Try: Rónan Kelleher; Hugo Keenan; Adam Byrne; Dan Sheehan; Con: Ross Byrne x 4 Pen: Ross Byrne |

Scotstoun Stadium
Attendance: 7,246
Referee: Craig Evans

===== Round 6 =====
27 November 2021
1pm

| Benetton (Italy) | 19–18 | (Scotland) Glasgow Warriors (1 BP) |
| Try: Rhyno Smith; Giovanni Pettinelli; Pen: Leonardo Marin x 3 | Preview; Report; Report; Report | Try: Jack Dempsey; Rory Darge; Con: Ross Thompson; Pen: Ross Thompson x 2 |

Stadio Comunale di Monigo
Referee: Marius van der Westhuizen

===== Round 7 =====
4 December 2021
7.35pm

| (1 BP) Glasgow Warriors (Scotland) | 33–14 | (Wales) Dragons |
| Try: Sione Tuipulotu; Kyle Steyn; Jack Dempsey; Ali Price; Johnny Matthews; Con: Ross Thompson x 4 | Preview; Report; Report; Report | Try: Ellis Shipp; Mesake Doge; Con: Sam Davies x 2 |

Scotstoun Stadium
Attendance: 6,453
Referee: Frank Murphy

===== Round 8 =====
11 February 2022
8.15pm

| Glasgow Warriors (Scotland) | 13–11 | (Ireland) Munster (1 BP) |
| Try: Cummings 39' c Con: Weir 40+1'; Pen: Weir (2) 16', 61' | Preview; Report; Report; Report | Try: Kleyn 72' m Pen: Healy (2) 38', 64' |

Scotstoun Stadium
Attendance: 6,238
Referee: Gianluca Gnecchi

===== Round 9 – 1872 Cup 1st leg =====
18 March 2022
7.35pm

| Glasgow Warriors (Scotland) | 30–17 | (Scotland) Edinburgh |
| Try: Gordon (2) 9' c, 30' c McKay 55' c Con: Weir (2) 10', 30'; Thompson 57'; Pen: Weir 40'; Thompson (2) 65', 72' | Preview; Report; Report; Report | Try: Young 14' c Venter 48' c Con: Boffelli (2) 15', 49'; Pen: Boffelli 35' |

Scotstoun Stadium
Attendance: 7,351
Referee: Hollie Davidson

===== Round 10 =====
8 January 2022
5.15pm

| (1 BP) Glasgow Warriors (Scotland) | 38–19 | (Wales) Ospreys |
| Try: Forbes 22' c Tuipulotu (2) 27' c, 62' c McKay 48' c Brown 73' c Con: Thompson (4) 24', 29', 50', 63'; Weir 74'; Pen: Thompson 8' | Preview; Report; Report; Report | Try: D. Evans 71' c Con: Anscombe 71'; Pen: Anscombe (4) 3', 11', 26', 31' |

Scotstoun Stadium
Attendance: Behind closed doors
Referee: Chris Busby

===== Round 11 =====
29 January 2022
2.55pm

| Connacht (Ireland) | 20–42 | (Scotland) Glasgow Warriors (1 BP) |
| Try: Arnold 13' c Boyle 43' c Con: Forde (2) 14', 44'; Pen: Forde (2) 42', 51' | Preview; Report; Report; Report | Try: McLean (2) 3' m, 60' m Steyn (2) 19' c, 63' c Brown 36' m Matthews 80+1' c Con: Weir (3) 21', 64', 80+2'; Pen: Weir (2) 46', 74' |

Galway Sportsgrounds
Attendance: 4,527
Referee: Nic Berry

===== Round 12 =====
19 February 2022
7.35pm

| Glasgow Warriors (Scotland) | 13–3 | (Italy) Benetton |
| Try: Smith 21' m Dempsey 58' m Pen: Miotti 4' | Preview; Report; Report; Report | Pen: Albornoz 7' |

Scotstoun Stadium
Referee: Frank Murphy

===== Round 13 =====
5 March 2022
5.15pm

| (1 BP) Scarlets (Wales) | 35–10 | (Scotland) Glasgow Warriors |
| Try: St. Evans 39' c S. Williams 43' c G. Davies 58' c Kalamafoni 66' c Conbeer 73' c Con: Patchell (3) 40', 43', 59'; St. Evans 65'; Costelow 74' | Preview; Report; Report; Report | Try: Matthews 4' c Con: Weir 6'; Pen: Weir 21' |

Parc y Scarlets
Attendance: 6,006
Referee: Chris Busby

===== Round 14 =====
26 March 2022
5.15pm

| (1 BP) Cardiff (Wales) | 32–28 | (Scotland) Glasgow Warriors (2 BP) |
| Try: Harries 4' m Cabango (2) 34' c, 69' c Halaholo 58' c Con: Evans (3) 35', 58', 69'; Pen: Evans (2) 11', 79' | Preview; Report; Report; Report | Try: Cancelliere (2) 15' c, 42' c Johnson 24' c Brown 29' c Con: Thompson (4) 16', 24', 30', 43' |

Cardiff Arms Park
Attendance: 6,275
Referee: AJ Jacobs

===== Round 15 =====
1 April 2022
7.35pm

| (1 BP) Glasgow Warriors (Scotland) | 40–12 | (Italy) Zebre Parma |
| Try: Matthews (3) 4' c, 43' m, 63' c Kebble 10' c Wilson 24' c Dobie 34' c Con: Thompson (5) 5', 11', 26', 34', 64' | Preview; Report; Report; Report | Try: Fusco 40+1' m Andreani 79' c Con: Rizzi 79' |

Scotstoun Stadium
Attendance: 6,927
Referee: Adam Jones

===== Round 16 =====
22 April 2022
5.15pm

| (1 BP) Stormers (South Africa) | 32–7 | (Scotland) Glasgow Warriors |
| Try: Pretorius 35' c Jantjies 53' m Zas 56' c Roos 80' c Con: Libbok (3) 36', 57', 80+2'; Pen: Libbok (2) 31', 39' | Preview; Report; Report; Report | Try: Dempsey 19' c Con: Thompson 20' |

Cape Town Stadium
Attendance: 4,762
Referee: Andrew Brace

===== Round 17 =====
29 April 2022
6pm

| (1 BP) Bulls (South Africa) | 29–17 | (Scotland) Glasgow Warriors |
| Try: Burger 10' c Tambwe 40+3' c Wa. Steenkamp 59' c Brink 62' m Con: Steyn (3) 10', 40+4', 59'; Pen: Steyn 29' | Preview; Report; Report; Report | Try: Penalty try 6'; Smith 74' c Con: Thompson 75'; Pen: Weir 21' |

Loftus Versfeld Stadium
Referee: Nika Amashukeli

===== Round 18 - 1872 Cup 2nd leg =====
21 May 2022
6.30pm

| Edinburgh (Scotland) | 28–11 | (Scotland) Glasgow Warriors |
| Try: Kinghorn 30' c Bradbury 45' m Hoyland 63' m Con: Boffelli (2) 31', 65'; Pen: Boffelli (3) 15', 40', 54' | Preview; Report; Report; Report | Try: Smith 68' m Pen: Thompson (2) 21', 37' |

Murrayfield Stadium
Attendance: 24,187
Referee: Andrew Brace

===== Play-offs =====
====== Quarter-final ======
4 June 2022
3.15pm

| Leinster (Ireland) | 76–14 | (Scotland) Glasgow Warriors |
| Try: Sheehan (2) 16' c, 39' m Larmour (2) 20' c, 64' m N. McCarthy 24' c Doris 43' c Alaalatoa 48' c Gibson-Park 54' c Ringrose 57' m Frawley 69' c McGrath 71' c J. O'Brien 77' m Con: R. Byrne (8) 17', 20', 26', 44', 49', 55', 70', 71' | Preview; Report; Report; Report | Try: Z. Fagerson 5' c Horne 60' c Con: Thompson (2) 5', 60' |

RDS Arena
Attendance: 9,346
Referee: Andrea Piardi

=== European Champions Cup ===
In a re-run of last season and the season before, Glasgow Warriors were again paired with Exeter Chiefs in the Champions Cup. The French opposition were La Rochelle, whom Glasgow had also faced in the 2019–20 season.

==== Pool ====
Pool A Standings
| Team | P | W | D | L | PF | PA | Diff | TF | TA | TB | LB | Pts |
|---|---|---|---|---|---|---|---|---|---|---|---|---|
| (France) Racing 92 | 4 | 4 | 0 | 0 | 126 | 24 | +102 | 16 | 3 | 3 | 0 | 19 |
| (Ireland) Ulster | 4 | 4 | 0 | 0 | 114 | 96 | +18 | 15 | 9 | 3 | 0 | 19 |
| (France) La Rochelle | 4 | 3 | 1 | 0 | 97 | 64 | +33 | 11 | 7 | 2 | 0 | 16 |
| (Ireland) Leinster | 4 | 3 | 0 | 1 | 198 | 62 | +136 | 30 | 8 | 3 | 0 | 15 |
| (England) Sale Sharks | 4 | 2 | 1 | 1 | 89 | 48 | +41 | 13 | 5 | 1 | 1 | 12 |
| (England) Exeter Chiefs | 4 | 2 | 0 | 2 | 127 | 82 | +45 | 19 | 7 | 3 | 0 | 11 |
| (France) Montpellier | 4 | 2 | 0 | 2 | 78 | 157 | –79 | 9 | 23 | 2 | 0 | 10 |
| (France) Clermont | 4 | 1 | 1 | 2 | 79 | 82 | –3 | 8 | 10 | 0 | 2 | 8 |
| (Scotland) Glasgow Warriors | 4 | 1 | 0 | 3 | 82 | 117 | –35 | 7 | 15 | 0 | 1 | 5 |
| (England) Northampton Saints | 4 | 0 | 0 | 4 | 56 | 124 | –68 | 6 | 17 | 0 | 2 | 2 |
| (England) Bath | 4 | 0 | 1 | 3 | 48 | 148 | –100 | 6 | 22 | 0 | 0 | 2 |
| (Wales) Ospreys | 4 | 0 | 0 | 4 | 33 | 123 | –90 | 3 | 17 | 0 | 0 | 0 |

==== Results ====
===== Round 1 =====
12 December 2021
4.15pm

| La Rochelle (France) | 20–13 | (Scotland) Glasgow Warriors (1 BP) |
| Try: Reda Wardi; Eneriko Buliruarua; Con: Ihaia West x 2 Pen: West x 2 | Preview; Report; Report; Report | Try: Kyle Steyn; Con: Ross Thompson; Pen: Ross Thompson x 2 |

Stade Marcel-Deflandre
Referee: Matthew Carley (England)

===== Round 2 =====
18 December 2021
5.30pm

| Glasgow Warriors (Scotland) | 22–7 | (England) Exeter Chiefs |
| Try: Johnny Matthews; Con: Duncan Weir; Pen: Ross Thompson x 5 | Preview; Report; Report; Report | Try: Sam Simmonds; Con: Joe Simmonds |

Scotstoun Stadium
Referee: Pierre Brousset (France)

===== Round 3 =====
15 January 2022
5.30pm

| Exeter Chiefs (England) | 52–17 | (Scotland) Glasgow Warriors |
| Try: O'Flaherty (3) 18' c, 56' c, 65' m S. Simmonds (2) 24' c, 51' c Cowan-Dickie 59' m Nowell 74' c Ewers 77' c Con: Simmonds (4/6) 19', 25', 52', 57'; Slade (2/2) 75', 78' | Preview; Report; Report; Report | Try: McDonald 31' c M. Fagerson 44' c Con: Thompson (2/2) 32', 46'; Pen: Thompson (1/1) 7' |

Sandy Park
Attendance: 11,841
Referee: Romain Poite (France)

===== Round 4 =====
22 January 2022
8pm

| Glasgow Warriors (Scotland) | 30–38 | (France) La Rochelle (1 BP) |
| Try: McKay 41' c Smith (2) 74' c, 80' c Con: Thompson (1/1) 41'; Weir (2/2) 75', 80+1'; Pen: Thompson (3/3) 9', 25', 33' | Preview; Report; Report; Report | Try: Rhule 19' c P.A. Boudehent 40+2' m Bourgarit 45' c P.I. Boudehent 50' c Con: Popelin (3/4) 21', 46', 50'; Pen: Popelin (3/4) 10', 49', 50'; West (1/1) 77' |

Scotstoun Stadium
Attendance: 6,723
Referee: Karl Dickson (England)

=== European Challenge Cup ===
==== Round of 16 ====
15 April 2022
8pm

| Newcastle Falcons (England) | 17–27 | (Scotland) Glasgow Warriors |
| Try: Montgomery 51' c Hodgson 65' c Con: Connon (1/1) 52'; Hodgson (1/1) 66'; Pen: Connon (1/1) 27' | Preview; Report; Report; Report | Try: Matthews 3' c Steyn (2) 6' m, 57' m McKay 31' c Con: Thompson (2/4) 4', 32'; Pen: Thompson (1/2) 62' |

Kingston Park
Attendance: 4,121
Referee: Tual Trainini (France)

==== Quarter-final ====
7 May 2022
9pm

| Lyon (France) | 35–27 | (Scotland) Glasgow Warriors |
| Try: Couilloud 35' c R. Taofifénua 55' c Niniashvili (2) 61' m, 75' c Con: Berdeu (2/3) 36', 76'; Doussain (1/1) 57'; Pen: Berdeu (3/4) 1', 12', 70' | Preview; Report; Report; Report | Try: McKay 5' c Forbes 39' c Penalty try 49'; Con: Thompson (2/2) 6', 40'; Pen: Thompson (2/2) 23', 27' |

Stade de Gerland
Attendance: 28,000
Referee: Matthew Carley (England)

== Warrior of the month awards ==
| Award | Winner |
|---|---|
| September | (Scotland) Johnny Matthews |
| October | (Scotland) Rory Darge |
| November | No announcement - only 1 match played |
| December | (Scotland) Sione Tuipulotu |
| January | (Scotland) Rory Darge |
| February | (Scotland) Ollie Smith |
| March | (Argentina) Sebastián Cancelliere |
| April | (Scotland) Johnny Matthews |
| May | (Scotland) Ollie Smith |

== End of Season awards ==
| Award | Winner |
|---|---|
| Young Player of the Season | (Scotland) Ollie Smith |
| Coaches Award | (Scotland) Rob Harley |
| Test Player of the Season | (Scotland) Rory Darge |
| Most Improved Player of the Season | (Scotland) Johnny Matthews |
| Al Kellock Leadership Award | (Scotland) Richie Gray |
| Community Hero of the Year | (Scotland) Cammy Little of Moffat RFC |
| Try of the Season | (New Zealand) Josh McKay vs. (Scotland) Edinburgh Rugby |
| Players' Player of the Season | (Scotland) Rory Darge |
| Player of the Season | (Scotland) Rory Darge |

== Competitive debuts this season ==
A player's nationality shown is taken from the nationality at the highest honour for the national side obtained; or if never capped internationally their place of birth. Senior caps take precedence over junior caps or place of birth; junior caps take precedence over place of birth. A player's nationality at debut may be different from the nationality shown. Combination sides like the British and Irish Lions or Pacific Islanders are not national sides, or nationalities.

Players in BOLD font have been capped by their senior international XV side as nationality shown.

Players in Italic font have capped either by their international 7s side; or by the international XV 'A' side as nationality shown.

Players in normal font have not been capped at senior level.

A position in parentheses indicates that the player debuted as a substitute. A player may have made a prior debut for Glasgow Warriors in a non-competitive match, 'A' match or 7s match; these matches are not listed.

Tournaments where competitive debut made:

| **Scottish Inter-District Championship** | **Welsh–Scottish League** | **WRU Challenge Cup** | **Celtic League** | **Celtic Cup** | **1872 Cup** | **Pro12** | **Pro14** | **Rainbow Cup** | **United Rugby Championship** | **European Challenge Cup** | **Heineken Cup / European Champions Cup** |

Crosshatching indicates a jointly hosted match.

| Number | Player nationality | Name | Position | Date of debut | Venue | Stadium | Opposition nationality | Opposition side | Tournament | Match result | Scoring debut |
|---|---|---|---|---|---|---|---|---|---|---|---|
| 329 | (Wales) | Brad Thyer | Prop | 2021-09-24 | Away | Ravenhill Stadium | (Ireland) | Ulster | United Rugby Championship | Loss | Nil |
| 330 | (Scotland) | **Simon Berghan** | Prop | 2021-09-24 | Away | Ravenhill Stadium | (Ireland) | Ulster | United Rugby Championship | Loss | Nil |
| 331 | (Australia) | **Jack Dempsey** | No. 8 | 2021-09-24 | Away | Ravenhill Stadium | (Ireland) | Ulster | United Rugby Championship | Loss | Nil |
| 332 | (Scotland) | **Sione Tuipulotu** | Centre | 2021-09-24 | Away | Ravenhill Stadium | (Ireland) | Ulster | United Rugby Championship | Loss | Nil |
| 333 | (Scotland) | **Murray McCallum** | (Prop) | 2021-09-24 | Away | Ravenhill Stadium | (Ireland) | Ulster | United Rugby Championship | Loss | Nil |
| 334 | (Scotland) | Murphy Walker | (Prop) | 2021-10-02 | Home | Scotstoun Stadium | (South Africa) | Sharks | United Rugby Championship | Win | Nil |
| 335 | (Scotland) | Ally Miller | (Flanker) | 2021-10-02 | Home | Scotstoun Stadium | (South Africa) | Sharks | United Rugby Championship | Win | Nil |
| 336 | (Argentina) | **Sebastián Cancelliere** | Wing | 2021-10-16 | Away | Stadio Sergio Lanfranchi | (Italy) | Zebre | United Rugby Championship | Win | Nil |
| 337 | (South Africa) | Nathan McBeth | (Prop) | 2021-11-27 | Away | Stadio Comunale di Monigo | (Italy) | Benetton Treviso | United Rugby Championship | Loss | Nil |
| 338 | (New Zealand) | Josh McKay | Full back | 2021-12-04 | Home | Scotstoun Stadium | (Wales) | Dragons | United Rugby Championship | Win | Nil |
| 339 | (Argentina) | **Domingo Miotti** | (Fly-half) | 2021-12-04 | Home | Scotstoun Stadium | (Wales) | Dragons | United Rugby Championship | Win | Nil |
| 340 | (Tonga) | **Walter Fifita** | (Wing) | 2022-01-08 | Home | Scotstoun Stadium | (Wales) | Ospreys | United Rugby Championship | Win | Nil |

== Sponsorship ==
- SP Energy Networks – Title Sponsor and Community Sponsor
- Scottish Power – Official Kit

=== Official kit supplier ===
- Macron

=== Official kit sponsors ===
- Malcolm Group
- McCrea Financial Services
- Denholm Oilfield
- Ross Hall Hospital
- Story Contracting
- Leidos

=== Official sponsors ===
- The Famous Grouse
- Clyde Travel Management
- Harper Macleod
- Caledonia Best
- Eden Mill Brewery and Distillery
- David Lloyd Leisure
- Crabbie's
- Cala Homes
- Capital Solutions
- Martha's Restaurant
- Sterling Furniture

=== Official partners ===
- A.G. Barr
- Benchmarx
- Black & Lizars
- Cameron House
- Glasgow Airport
- Healthspan Elite
- KubeNet
- Mentholatum
- MSC Nutrition
- Smile Plus
- Lenco Utilities
- Scot JCB News Scotland
- HF Group
- Primestaff
- Village Hotel Club
- The Crafty Pig
- Kooltech
- Savills
- iPro Sports
- RHA
