= 2020–21 Glasgow Warriors season =

Glasgow Warriors 2020–2021
- Ground: Scotstoun Stadium (Capacity: 7,351)
- Coach: (England) Danny Wilson
- Captain(s): (Scotland) Ryan Wilson (Scotland) Fraser Brown
- Most caps: (Scotland) Ryan Wilson (22)
- Top scorer: (Scotland) Ross Thompson (103)
- Most tries: (Scotland) Nick Grigg (4) (Scotland) Huw Jones (4) (Scotland) George Turner (4)
- League: Pro14
- 4th in Conference A
1st kit	2nd kit

The 2020–21 season will see Glasgow Warriors compete in the competitions: the Guinness Pro14 and the European Rugby Champions Cup. The Pro14 had been reduced to 12 sides this season due to the COVID-19 pandemic, as the South African sides could not take part.

After being unable to fulfil their fixture against Lyon in the Champions Cup, after a number of their players contracted COVID-19 and others had to isolate after playing against a covid-hosted Exeter Chiefs side (also in the European Rugby Champions Cup), the Glasgow side were then placed in the European Rugby Challenge Cup.

A further tournament was later announced. The Rainbow Cup was an end of season tournament intended as a precursor to 4 South African Super Rugby Unlocked franchises joining the Pro14 in the following season.

== Season overview ==
The season was dominated by COVID-19 pandemic concerns. Due to the pandemic matches were played without fans; and there were strict penalties should a club have to miss a match. For rugby union in Scotland, only the international sides and the two Pro14 sides remained operational. For this to work, the squads had to remain in their own 'bubble' to limit interaction with others and so curtail the spread of COVID-19.

The 'bubble' approach largely worked. Glasgow Warriors had one serious outbreak of coronavirus; and that was purely through contact with an English side on the pitch, Exeter Chiefs as they played them in the Champions Cup. However the consequence of the 'bubble' approach was felt more keenly by the Glasgow Warriors when their international players left to play in the international windows of the Autumn Internationals and the Six Nations. The Scotland international squad had its own 'bubble'. That meant the Glasgow Warriors played called up for Scotland could not easily return to the Warriors, if for example, they were not selected for an international match in that window; as was the case in previous seasons.

The pandemic had hindered recruitment for the new head coach Danny Wilson; and the impact of the coronavirus mitigation in place of no fans and the 'bubble' approach with the secondment of players, lowered expectations of what the Warriors could achieve this season, especially as most expected this to be a rebuilding season without the pandemic in the background. However this was still Glasgow Warriors, and even on lower seasonal expectations there was still a demand that the club be competitive and provide a challenge to other top sides.

Player discipline during matches turned out to be a key factor in the Glasgow Warriors season. This meant that the Warriors did not challenge for the top honours in the Pro14 but had to be content in securing Champions Cup qualification for the following season. After the Warriors were dumped out of this season's coronavirus hit Champions Cup and instead placed in the Challenge Cup's last 16, discipline remained a problem; a red card to TJ Ioane, who was subsequent given a five-match ban, saw the 14-man Warriors edged out by Montpellier.

By the end of the season; and with 18 players leaving the side, including club legends Chris Fusaro (183 caps), Tommy Seymour (150 caps), Leone Nakarawa (80 caps) and Niko Matuwalu (138 caps) among stalwarts like Alex Allan (109 caps), Lee Jones (92 caps) and D'Arcy Rae (86 caps) and stars like Huw Jones (49 caps) and Adam Hastings (52 caps), the rebuilding that many predicted proved accurate.

Some new signings to replace the departures have been announced but in the promotion of academy prospects like Ross Thompson, Rufus McLean, Ollie Smith and Tom Lambert, the appearance of Gregor Brown, and the arrival and impact of other new boys Cole Forbes and Rory Darge have gave the season end a much better report than would otherwise been the case. In the end of season tournament, the Rainbow Cup, although initially stung by the Northern Hemisphere's eventual finalist Benetton Treviso in a surprise upsurge in their form, the Warriors won the next four matches in a row, securing the 1872 Cup in the process and beating this season's Pro14 winners Leinster in their last match of the tournament.

Forbes, Darge, McLean and Thompson were subsequently called up by Scotland for their summer international matches, alongside other Warriors like Kiran Macdonald, Jamie Dobie, George Horne and Kyle Steyn. Incoming signings for next season like Jamie Bhatti and Sione Tuipoluto were also selected. Ross Thompson secured the Warriors Young Player of the Season award; in a season where he made his competitive debut in January 2021 he broke the 100 points milestone the same season. He became only the fourth Glasgow Warrior in history to do so in his debut season; and the third fastest, behind only Tommy Hayes and Dan Parks and ahead of Calvin Howarth.

A season which started poorly ended with good progress in the end; and optimism for the coming season is apparent.

== Team ==
=== Coaches ===
- Head coach: (England) Danny Wilson
- Assistant coach: (Scotland) Kenny Murray
- Assistant coach: (Scotland) Peter Murchie (from March 2021)
- Assistant coach: (Scotland) Kelly Brown (to February 2021)
- Scrum coach: (South Africa) Petrus du Plessis (to October 2020)
- Attack coach: (Ireland) Jonny Bell
- Head strength and conditioning coach: (New Zealand) Brad Mayo (to Jan 2021)
- Head strength and conditioning coach: (Ireland) Cillian Reardon (from Feb 2021)
- Assistant strength and conditioning coach: (Ireland) Liam Walshe
- Assistant strength and conditioning coach: (England) Jonathan Harris-Wright
- Assistant strength and conditioning coach: (England) Tom Savage
- Lead performance analyst: Greg Woolard
- Assistant performance analyst: Graham O'Riordan

=== Squad ===
Hookers (Scotland) Fraser Brown (Fiji) Mesu Dolokoto (Scotland) Johnny Matthews (Scotland) Grant Stewart (Scotland) George Turner Props (Scotland) Alex Allan (Australia) Dylan Evans (Scotland) Zander Fagerson (Scotland) Oli Kebble (Scotland) Tom Lambert (Scotland) Adam Nicol (Argentina) Enrique Pieretto (Scotland) D'Arcy Rae (New Zealand) Aki Seiuli (Scotland) George Thornton Locks (Scotland) Hamish Bain (England) Lewis Bean (Scotland) Scott Cummings (Scotland) Richie Gray (Scotland) Kiran McDonald (Fiji) Leone Nakarawa (England) James Scott	Loose forwards (Scotland) Rory Darge (Scotland) Matt Fagerson (Scotland) Bruce Flockhart (Scotland) Chris Fusaro (Scotland) Thomas Gordon (Scotland) Rob Harley (Samoa) TJ Ioane (Tonga) Fotu Lokotui (Scotland) Ryan Wilson Scrum halves (Scotland) Jamie Dobie (Scotland) George Horne (Scotland) Sean Kennedy (Scotland) Ali Price Fly halves (Scotland) Adam Hastings (Ireland) Ian Keatley (Scotland) Ross Thompson (South Africa) Brandon Thomson	Centres (Scotland) Nick Grigg (Scotland) Peter Horne (Scotland) Sam Johnson (Scotland) Huw Jones (Scotland) Patrick Kelly (Scotland) Stafford McDowall (Scotland) Ollie Smith (Scotland) Kyle Steyn Back Three (Scotland) Glenn Bryce (Scotland) Lee Jones (Fiji) Nikola Matawalu (Scotland) Robbie Nairn (Scotland) Rufus McLean (Scotland) Tommy Seymour (Australia) Ratu Tagive (New Zealand) Cole Forbes

==== Scottish Rugby Academy Stage 3 players ====
These players are given a professional contract by the Scottish Rugby Academy. Although given placements they are not contracted by Glasgow Warriors. Players graduate from the academy when a professional club contract is offered.

These players are assigned to Glasgow Warriors for the season 2020–21.

Academy players promoted in the course of the season are listed with the main squad.

- (Scotland) Murphy Walker – Prop
- (Scotland) Angus Fraser – Hooker
- (Scotland) Alex Samuel – Lock
- (Scotland) Max Williamson – Lock
- (Scotland) Gregor Brown – Flanker
- (Scotland) Rory Jackson – Flanker
- (Scotland) Euan Cunningham – Fly-half
- (Scotland) Michael Gray – Centre
- (Scotland) Robbie McCallum – Centre
- (Scotland) Connor de Bruyn – Centre
- (Scotland) Finlay Callaghan – Wing
- (Scotland) Ollie Melville – Full-back

==== Back up players ====
Other players used by Glasgow Warriors over the course of the season.

- Robbie Fergusson (Scotland 7s) – Centre
- (New Zealand) Caleb Korteweg (Stirling County) – Scrum-half
- (Australia) Jordan Lenac (Ayrshire Bulls) – Scrum-half
- (Scotland) Will Hurd – Prop
- Tom Brown (Scotland 7s) – Full back
- Harvey Elms (Scotland 7s) – Full back

== Player statistics ==
During the 2020–21 season, Glasgow have used 55 different players in competitive games. The table below shows the number of appearances and points scored by each player.

Pos.	Nation	Name	Pro14			Champions Cup			Challenge Cup			Rainbow Cup			Total	
Pos.	Nation	Name	Apps (sub)	Tries	Points kicked	Apps (sub)	Tries	Points kicked	Apps (sub)	Tries	Points kicked	Apps (sub)	Tries	Points kicked	Apps (sub)	Total pts
HK	(Scotland)	Fraser Brown	4	1	0	0	0	0	1	0	0	3(1)	1	0	8(1)	10
HK	(Scotland)	Johnny Matthews	1(8)	2	0	0	0	0	0	0	0	0	0	0	1(8)	10
HK	(Scotland)	Grant Stewart	8(3)	2	0	(1)	0	0	0	0	0	(2)	0	0	8(6)	10
HK	(Scotland)	George Turner	3(3)	2	0	1	0	0	(1)	0	0	3(2)	2	0	7(6)	20
PR	(Scotland)	Alex Allan	(6)	0	0	0	0	0	0	0	0	0	0	0	(6)	0
PR	(Australia)	Dylan Evans	(4)	0	0	0	0	0	(1)	0	0	(1)	0	0	(6)	0
PR	(Scotland)	Zander Fagerson	3	0	0	1	0	0	1	0	0	3	0	0	8	0
PR	(Scotland)	Oli Kebble	5	1	0	1	0	0	1	0	0	2	0	0	9	5
PR	(Scotland)	Tom Lambert	0	0	0	0	0	0	0	0	0	1(4)	0	0	1(4)	0
PR	(Argentina)	Enrique Pieretto	10(3)	0	0	(1)	0	0	(1)	0	0	2(2)	0	0	12(7)	0
PR	(Scotland)	D'Arcy Rae	3(9)	1	0	0	0	0	0	0	0	(3)	0	0	3(12)	5
PR	(New Zealand)	Aki Seiuli	11(4)	2	0	(1)	0	0	0	0	0	2	0	0	13(5)	10
PR	(Scotland)	George Thornton	(1)	0	0	0	0	0	0	0	0	0	0	0	(1)	0
LK	(Scotland)	Hamish Bain	3(3)	0	0	(1)	0	0	0	0	0	0	0	0	3(4)	0
LK	(England)	Lewis Bean	3(2)	1	0	0	0	0	0	0	0	0	0	0	3(2)	5
LK	(Scotland)	Scott Cummings	4	0	0	1	0	0	0	0	0	3	0	0	8	0
LK	(Scotland)	Richie Gray	7(2)	0	0	0	0	0	1	0	0	2(1)	0	0	10(3)	0
LK	(Scotland)	Kiran McDonald	5(1)	0	0	1	0	0	0	0	0	(4)	1	0	6(5)	5
LK	(Fiji)	Leone Nakarawa	3(3)	0	0	0	0	0	(1)	0	0	(1)	0	0	3(5)	0
LK	(England)	James Scott	2(2)	0	0	0	0	0	0	0	0	0	0	0	2(2)	0
BR	(Scotland)	Gregor Brown	1(1)	0	0	0	0	0	0	0	0	0	0	0	1(1)	0
BR	(Scotland)	Rory Darge	0	0	0	0	0	0	0	0	0	3(1)	0	0	3(1)	0
BR	(Scotland)	Matt Fagerson	4	1	0	1	0	0	0	0	0	3	2	0	8	15
BR	(Scotland)	Chris Fusaro	1(3)	0	0	0	0	0	0	0	0	0	0	0	1(3)	0
BR	(Scotland)	Thomas Gordon	13(1)	3	0	0	0	0	1	0	0	1(2)	0	0	15(3)	15
BR	(Scotland)	Rob Harley	12(1)	0	0	1	0	0	1	0	0	5	0	0	19(1)	0
BR	(Samoa)	TJ Ioane	5(6)	2	0	(1)	0	0	(1)	0	0	0	0	0	5(8)	10
BR	(Tonga)	Fotu Lokotui	2(7)	2	0	0	0	0	1	0	0	2	1	0	5(7)	15
BR	(Scotland)	Ryan Wilson	15	1	0	1	0	0	1	0	0	5	0	0	22	5
SH	(Scotland)	Jamie Dobie	4(6)	1	0	(1)	0	0	0	0	0	(1)	0	0	4(8)	5
SH	(Scotland)	Sean Kennedy	6(4)	1	0	0	0	0	0	0	0	1(4)	0	0	6(4)	5
SH	(New Zealand)	Caleb Korteweg	(1)	0	0	0	0	0	0	0	0	0	0	0	(1)	0
SH	(Australia)	Jordan Lenac	(1)	0	0	0	0	0	0	0	0	0	0	0	(1)	0
SH	(Scotland)	George Horne	2(2)	2	0	0	0	0	(1)	0	0	3(1)	1	0	5(4)	15
SH	(Scotland)	Ali Price	4	0	0	1	0	0	1	0	0	2(1)	0	0	8(1)	0
FH	(Scotland)	Adam Hastings	5	0	34	0	0	0	1	0	15	3	1	0	9	54
FH	(Ireland)	Ian Keatley	(3)	0	8	0	0	0	0	0	0	(1)	1	4	(4)	17
FH	(Scotland)	Ross Thompson	5(3)	1	55	0	0	0	(1)	0	6	5	1	32	10(4)	103
FH	(South Africa)	Brandon Thomson	1(5)	0	8	(1)	0	0	0	0	0	0	0	0	1(6)	8
CE	(Scotland)	Robbie Fergusson	9(1)	0	0	0	0	0	0	0	0	0	0	0	9(1)	0
CE	(Scotland)	Nick Grigg	12(1)	3	0	1	0	0	1	0	0	5	1	0	19(1)	20
CE	(Scotland)	Peter Horne	6(2)	0	30	1	0	0	0	0	0	(1)	0	0	7(3)	30
CE	(Scotland)	Sam Johnson	6	0	0	1	0	0	1	0	0	3	0	0	11	0
CE	(Scotland)	Huw Jones	9(1)	4	0	(1)	0	0	1	0	0	0	0	0	10(2)	20
CE	(Scotland)	Stafford McDowall	3	0	0	0	0	0	0	0	0	2(3)	0	0	5(3)	0
CE	(Scotland)	Ollie Smith	4(2)	0	0	0	0	0	0	0	0	(1)	0	0	4(3)	0
CE	(Scotland)	Kyle Steyn	0	0	0	0	0	0	0	0	0	5	3	0	5	15
WG	(Scotland)	Lee Jones	7	1	0	1	0	0	1	0	0	(1)	0	0	9(1)	5
WG	(Fiji)	Nikola Matawalu	3(4)	1	0	0	0	0	(1)	0	0	(2)	0	0	3(7)	5
WG	(Scotland)	Rufus McLean	6	3	0	0	0	0	1	0	0	1(1)	0	0	8(1)	15
WG	(Scotland)	Robbie Nairn	2	0	0	0	0	0	0	0	0	0	0	0	2	0
WG	(Scotland)	Tommy Seymour	5	1	0	1	0	0	0	0	0	0	0	0	6	5
WG	(Australia)	Ratu Tagive	7(3)	0	0	0	0	0	0	0	0	2	0	0	9(3)	0
FB	(Scotland)	Glenn Bryce	4(1)	1	0	1	0	0	0	0	0	0	0	0	5(1)	5
FB	(New Zealand)	Cole Forbes	2	0	0	0	0	0	0	0	0	4	2	0	6	10

== Staff movements ==
=== Coaches ===
==== Personnel in ====
- (England) Danny Wilson from Scotland
- (Ireland) Jonny Bell from (England) Gloucester
- (Scotland) Kelly Brown from (England) Saracens
- (Ireland) Cillian Reardon from (Ireland) Leinster
- (Scotland) Peter Murchie from (Scotland) Ayrshire Bulls

==== Personnel out ====
- (New Zealand) Dave Rennie to Australia
- (New Zealand) Jason O'Halloran to (Japan) Suntory Sungoliath (assistant coach)
- John Dalziel to Scotland (forwards coach)
- (South Africa) Petrus du Plessis to Australia (scrum coach)
- (New Zealand) Brad Mayo to (Australia) ACT Brumbies (performance manager)
- (Scotland) Kelly Brown released

Some coaches from the various Scotland set-ups were helping at the club during the covid pandemic:

- (Scotland) Shade Munro – forwards
- (Scotland) Gary Strain – scrum

== Player movements ==
=== Academy promotions ===
- (Scotland) Rufus McLean from Scottish Rugby Academy
- (Scotland) Ross Thompson from Scottish Rugby Academy
- (Scotland) Ollie Smith from Scottish Rugby Academy
- (Scotland) Tom Lambert from Scottish Rugby Academy

=== Player transfers ===
==== In ====
- (Scotland) Richie Gray from (France) Toulouse
- (Argentina) Enrique Pieretto from (England) Exeter Chiefs
- (Scotland) Hamish Bain from (France) Stade Niçois
- (Tonga) Fotu Lokotui from (England) Doncaster Knights
- (Samoa) TJ Ioane from (England) London Irish (loan)
- (England) Lewis Bean from (England) Northampton Saints (loan)
- (Ireland) Ian Keatley from (Italy) Benetton Treviso
- (England) James Scott from (England) Worcester Warriors (loan)
- (New Zealand) Cole Forbes from (New Zealand) Bay of Plenty
- (Scotland) Rory Darge from (Scotland) Edinburgh Rugby

==== Out ====
- (Scotland) Jonny Gray to (England) Exeter Chiefs
- (Scotland) Cameron Henderson to (England) Leicester Tigers
- (Australia) Nick Frisby released
- (Tonga) Siua Halanukonuka to (France) Perpignan
- (Canada) D. T. H. van der Merwe released
- (Scotland) Rory Hughes released
- (Scotland) Matt Smith retired'
- (Scotland) Ruaridh Jackson retired'
- (New Zealand) Callum Gibbins released
- (Scotland) Tim Swinson to (England) Saracens
- (Scotland) Andrew Davidson to (Scotland) Edinburgh Rugby
- (Scotland) Marshall Sykes to (Scotland) Edinburgh Rugby
- (Scotland) Adam Ashe released
- (Scotland) Charlie Capps released
- (Scotland) Bruce Flockhart sabbatical
- (Fiji) Jale Vakaloloma released
- (South Africa) Brandon Thomson to (South Africa) Cheetahs
- (England) Lewis Bean to (England) Northampton Saints (loan ends)
- (Scotland) Will Hurd to (England) Leicester Tigers
- (England) James Scott to (England) Worcester Warriors (loan ends)
- (Scotland) Adam Nicol to Jersey Reds
- (Scotland) Tommy Seymour retired'

== Competitions ==
=== Pre-season and friendlies ===
There was no friendly matches this season; however Glasgow Warriors and Edinburgh did play a closed doors 'A' match. Edinburgh released a squad 23, however Glasgow Warriors did not release player information. The Offside Line stated that Glasgow planned to treat the match purely as training match and rotate a large squad throughout the game. There were however limited video highlights which meant that Warriors fans could determine the probable squad used, listed below. Some player numbers were duplicated by the Glasgow side.

==== Match 1 ====
4 February 2021

Glasgow Warriors 'A' (Scotland)	19-22	(Scotland) Edinburgh 'A'

Scotstoun Stadium
Attendance: 0
Referee: Hollie Davidson

Glasgow Warriors: 1 Tom Lambert, 2 Mesu Dolokoto, 3 D'Arcy Rae, 4 Hamish Bain, 5 Max Williamson, 6 Fotu Lokotui, 7 Chris Fusaro, 8 Rory Jackson, 9 Jordan Lenac, 10 Tom Jordan, 11 Robbie Nairn, 12 Stafford McDowall, 13 Harvey Elms, 14 Ollie Melville, 15 Tom Brown
Replacements: 16 Angus Fraser, 17 George Thornton, 18 Adam Nicol, 18 Will Hurd, 19 Harrison Courtney, 20 Gregor Brown, 20 Connor De Bruyn, 21 Kaleem Barreto, 21 Michael Gray, 22 Brandon Thomson, 22 Lomond MacPherson, 23 Robbie McCallum, 23 Finlay Callaghan, Euan Cunningham
Edinburgh: 15. Damien Hoyland, 14. Nathan Sweeney, 13. Matthew Currie, 12. Matt Gordon, 11. Alec Coombes, 10. Nathan Chamberlain, 9. Roan Frostwick, 1. Sam Grahamslaw, 2. Sam Kitchen, 3. Murray McCallum, 4. Mesulame Kunavula, 5. Marshall Sykes, 6. Ally Miller, 7. Connor Boyle CAPTAIN, 8. Ben Muncaster
Replacements: Patrick Harrison, Shaun Gunn, Cole Lamberton, Angus Williams, Rory Darge, Charlie Shiel, Charlie Savala, Cameron Scott, Scott King, Sam Pecqueur

=== Pro14 ===
This season's Pro14 campaign began with a near traditional away trip to Connacht. The Irish side edged the match; and for the Warriors Tommy Seymour became the first player to score tries in 10 consecutive seasons; and his try in Galway was his 5th opening fixture try. The loss left Warriors Assistant Coach Kenny Murray rueing the Warriors discipline. Better was to follow with Glasgow's home opener with the Scarlets; a dominant first hour of the match enough to secure the win. Danny Wilson said: "Our work at the breakdown and collisions was a lot better than theirs I thought, and our discipline was much improved from last week for the first hour or so. We let our foot off the gas a bit and we’ll look at that, but tonight was all about the win." The Warriors again started well against the Ospreys with tries from Huw Jones and George Turner but failed to convert line-breaks by Nick Grigg and Grant Stewart and a poor second half saw the Welsh side capitalise on Glasgow's missed opportunities to run out winners; the Ospreys first home win in the Pro14 since February 2020.

A tough match was expected against last season's champions Leinster at Scotstoun Stadium. They gave Glasgow Warriors their last league defeat at Scotstoun back in November 2019 and had a better start this season. A young Glasgow side gave a battling performance but lost out to the Irish province; though D'Arcy Rae scored his first try for the Scotstoun side. Wilson took positives from the match: "There’ll be some lessons to learn along the way, but ultimately the fact that we’ve got these young Scottish-qualified players coming through and developing with us can only be a good thing in the long run." Another Irish province with a good start this season was Ulster and the away match was next up. Glasgow were without 18 players; and in the warm-up scrum-half Jamie Dobie suffered a shoulder injury. The Glasgow side was filled with Super 6, Scotland 7s and other players with limited training time. A clinical Ulster side was praised by Wilson but in Glasgow colours he singled out Sean Kennedy and Caleb Korteweg who both filled in at scrum-half. The match against Munster was the third Irish province fixture in a row in the Pro14. The Warriors had 22 players unavailable; indeed they only had 23 full time players available to them for the match, so positionally they called in loan signings TJ Ioane and Lewis Bean, Scotland 7s international Robbie Fergusson and Super 6 Caleb Korteweg to make up the playing squad. However again it was the lack of discipline that let Glasgow down and Munster secured the full points in the last quarter.

Next up was a Welsh double header. The match against Cardiff Blues gave the Warriors their first away win of the season. Peter Horne and Ryan Wilson pulled on the Warriors shirt putting them 3rd equal with Graeme Morrison for the highest Warriors appearances. Danny Wilson said: "We talk a lot about the fight, passion and energy we expect to see when someone pulls on a Warriors jersey and we definitely saw that from the whole team tonight." The match against the Dragons proved more stuffy. The Warriors fielded their oldest starting XV in four years with an average age of 29.0. Brandon Thomson missed the final kick of the match in front of the posts to secure a Warriors victory; Wilson reflected and spread the blame: "We’re not going to put anything on Brandon’s shoulders. We didn’t perform well enough and didn’t put enough points on the board. That’s the story and that’s what we have to focus on."

The Pro14 rescheduled the Round 9 fixtures; as a result the Round 10 match became the first leg of the 1872 Cup. For 8 of the Warriors players, this would be their 1872 Cup debut. This Scottish derby was packed full of Scottish-qualified players; 26 of the 30 players starting were Scottish Qualified; and of the remaining few Edinburgh's Pierre Schoeman would attain his Scottish qualification later that year. Edinburgh won a tight first leg; Wilson stating: "Obviously it’s disappointing to lose, but I thought we looked a bit more like ourselves today. We were adventurous and tried to play some rugby by moving the ball, and we caused Edinburgh problems. It was a game that came down to fine margins and we were on the wrong end of those margins in the end. Our discipline again wasn’t good enough for me, but I’ve got to give credit to our defence tonight. You’ve got to remember that’s a pretty much fully loaded Edinburgh side that went out there today, and they’re a dangerous team. Our defensive effort was excellent today." The Warriors reversed that marginal outcome in the 1872 Cup 2nd leg at home, this time running out victors in another tight match. Wilson noted the performance by young stars Ross Thompson and Rufus McLean; with Thompson in a man of the match performance in his first start for the club. "To come out of the academy and make your first start in a derby is pressure enough as it is, and I thought Ross was outstanding tonight. You need your goal-kicker to step up in tight games like tonight, and he was nearly flawless. The way he played generally was also really pleasing, and he stood up in defence really well – Edinburgh sent big Mata at him a couple of times and he chopped him down. Credit to him, and it’s really pleasing and promising looking long-term. I also thought Rufus stood up really well tonight – he went looking for work and showed up well. It’s a real positive to have these young Scottish talents coming through the system." and summed up: "It was a properly gutsy performance. If I’m honest I feel we deserved to and should have won by more, but that’s nit-picking really. I’m delighted with the effort tonight."

The Warriors match against Benetton was postponed, due to a frozen pitch. Matches against Ulster and Leinster followed. For the Ulster match, veterans Ryan Wilson and Rob Harley had more caps for Glasgow than the combined caps of the rest of the XV. Glasgow got within a score of Ulster and Wilson said: "I thought we played some good rugby and defended well at times. The one thing we need to really improve is control at breakdown which stopped us going through the amount of phases we need to break them down." Ill-discipline proved Warriors undoing against Leinster at the RDS Arena. New signing Cole Forbes was yellow-carded giving away a penalty try in the process; and then Adam Hastings was red-carded; and late in the match TJ Ioane was also yellow-carded. Despite this the Warriors ran in 3 tries and although the understaffed Glasgow side ran out of steam at the end of the match with Leinster securing a 40–21 win, it showed what the Warriors were capable of, if they could get their discipline right.

Coming into Round 14 of the Pro14, the Warriors were sitting 5th in their conference. That was outside the qualification range for next year's European Champions Cup. Dragons were a point below, Zebre a point above, and Ospreys grip on 3rd place was seemingly tight. The Pro14 had confirmed that for this season combined rankings would determine the qualification spots for the Champions Cup. The only thing in Warriors favour was they had to play Zebre, Ospreys and Dragons in their run-in; and still had the postponed Benetton match to play. A good run could see the Warriors clinch the 3rd or 4th spot and eliminate their rivals chances in the process but even that would be ranked alongside the Conference B table. The match against Zebre in Italy saw Glasgow secure a bonus point win, overcoming ill-discipline again which saw the Warriors down to 13 men at one point in the match. Next up was the Ospreys and the Warriors won that with Ross Thompson winning the plaudits in another man of the match performance. After a rainy night in Scotstoun, assistant coach Jonny Bell said: "I thought our set-piece was excellent. It was important that we controlled the game well in conditions like those, and Ross [Thompson] stepped up and ran the show with real maturity. Sean [Kennedy] and Jamie [Dobie] dovetailed well in the second half too, and that gave us the control we needed to be the team on top in that second half. No two ways about it – the next two games are must-wins for us now. We know we’ll need a favour along the way, but all we can control is making sure we get the two wins from those two matches."

Third spot was denied the Warriors when the Ospreys pulled off a miraculous comeback to beat Leinster 24–19, when the Dublin side were winning 19–3 with a little over 20 minutes left to play. Champions Cup hopes were now very slim; and dependent on the Warriors maximising their points from their last 2 matches; together with a run of results going their way in Conference B. A loss away to the Dragons, despite a wonder try by Rufus McLean, meant that 4th spot was now a straight two-way fight between the Dragons and the Warriors in their last matches. The Warriors secured the 5 points in their match against Benetton; leaving Dragons a mountain to climb in their home match against Edinburgh. The Welsh side had to win with a try bonus and with a margin of 45 points; they did win the match, scoring 3 tries in a 24–17 victory. It wasn't nearly enough, and the Warriors took the 4th spot, and it seemed likely that it would secure European Champions Cup qualification for the 15th consecutive season for Glasgow Warriors next season.

==== League table ====
2020–21 Pro14 table
Conference A
	Team	P	W	D	L	PF	PA	PD	TF	TA	TBP	LBP	PTS
1	(Ireland) Leinster (CH)	16	14	0	2	576	285	+291	82	33	14	1	71
2	(Ireland) Ulster	16	14	0	2	469	263	+206	65	34	8	0	64
3	(Wales) Ospreys	16	8	0	8	301	318	-17	34	39	1	3	36
4	(Scotland) Glasgow Warriors	16	6	0	10	335	377	-42	40	47	2	4	30
5	(Wales) Dragons	16	6	0	10	215	394	-79	36	50	2	3	29
6	(Italy) Zebre	16	4	0	12	237	508	-271	22	69	0	1	17
Conference B
	Team	P	W	D	L	PF	PA	PD	TF	TA	TBP	LBP	PTS
1	(Ireland) Munster (RU)	16	14	0	2	413	250	+163	49	26	7	2	64
2	(Ireland) Connacht	16	8	0	8	396	353	+43	53	36	7	6	45
3	(Wales) Scarlets	16	8	0	8	319	333	-14	36	38	3	4	39
4	(Wales) Cardiff Blues	16	8	0	8	265	284	-19	30	32	3	1	36
5	(Scotland) Edinburgh	16	5	1	10	247	344	-97	29	43	1	4	29*
6	(Italy) Benetton	16	0	1	15	252	415	-164	34	53	1	6	7*
* Cancelled fixture: Edinburgh awarded four match points.
If teams are level at any stage, tiebreakers are applied in the following order: 1. number of matches won 2. the difference between points for and points against 3. the number of tries scored 4. the most points scored 5. the difference between tries for and tries against 6. the fewest red cards received 7. the fewest yellow cards received
Green background indicates teams that will compete in the Pro14 Final, and also earn a place in the 2021–22 European Champions Cup Blue background indicates teams outside the play-off places that earn a place in the 2021–22 European Champions Cup; Plain background indicates teams that earn a place in the 2021–22 European Rugby Challenge Cup. (CH) Champions. (RU) Runners-up. (PO) Champions Cup play-off winners.

==== Results ====
===== Round 1 =====
3 October 2020
17:15

Connacht Rugby (Ireland)	28–24	(Scotland) Glasgow Warriors (1BP)
Try: Bundee Aki (2); Quinn Roux; Con: Jack Carty (2); Pen: Jack Carty (3)	Preview; Report; Report; Report	Try: Nick Grigg; Huw Jones; Tommy Seymour; Con: Adam Hastings (3); Pen: Adam Hastings

Galway Sportsgrounds
Attendance: 200
Referee: Craig Evans (WRU)

===== Round 2 =====
11 October 2020
17:15

Glasgow Warriors (Scotland)	20–7	(Wales) Scarlets
Try: Oli Kebble; Ryan Wilson; Con: Adam Hastings (2); Pen: Adam Hastings (2)	Preview; Report; Report; Report	Try: Samson Lee; Con: Leigh Halfpenny

Scotstoun Stadium
Attendance: 0
Referee: Frank Murphy (IRFU)

===== Round 3 =====
24 October 2020
17:30

Ospreys (Wales)	23–15	(Scotland) Glasgow Warriors
Try: Reuben Morgan-Williams; Kieran Williams; Con: Stephen Myler (2); Pen: Stephen Myler (3)	Preview; Report; Report; Report	Try: Huw Jones; George Turner; Con: Peter Horne; Pen: Peter Horne

Liberty Stadium
Attendance: 0
Referee: George Clancy (IRFU)

===== Round 4 =====
2 November 2020
20:15

Glasgow Warriors (Scotland)	19–32	(Ireland) Leinster (1BP)
Try: George Horne; D'Arcy Rae; Thomas Gordon; Con: Peter Horne (2)	Preview; Report; Report; Report	Try: Jimmy O'Brien; Luke McGrath; Scott Penny; Michael Bent; Con: Harry Byrne (3); Pen: Harry Byrne (2)

Scotstoun Stadium
Attendance: 0
Referee: Ben Whitehouse (WRU)

===== Round 5 =====
9 November 2020
20:15

(1BP) Ulster (Ireland)	40–15	(Scotland) Glasgow Warriors
Try: John Andrew; Marcell Coetzee; Sam Carter; John Cooney; Sean Reidy; Matt Faddes; Con: John Cooney (5)	Preview; Report; Report; Report	Try: TJ Ioane; Grant Stewart; Con: Peter Horne; Pen: Peter Horne

Kingspan Stadium
Attendance: 0
Referee: Nigel Owens (WRU)

===== Round 6 =====
23 November 2020
20:15

Glasgow Warriors (Scotland)	13–27	(Ireland) Munster (1BP)
Try: Glenn Bryce; Grant Stewart; Pen: Brandon Thomson	Preview; Report; Report; Report	Try: Billy Holland; Fineen Wycherley; Gavin Coombes; Jean Kleyn; Con: Ben Healy (2); Pen: Ben Healy

Scotstoun Stadium
Attendance: 0
Referee: Adam Jones (WRU)

===== Round 7 =====
29 November 2020
19:35

Cardiff Blues (Wales)	10–19	(Scotland) Glasgow Warriors
Try: Kristian Dacey; Con: Jarrod Evans; Pen: Jarrod Evans	Preview; Report; Report; Report	Try: Huw Jones; Con: Brandon Thomson; Pen: Peter Horne (3); Brandon Thomson

Rodney Parade
Attendance: 0
Referee: Frank Murphy (IRFU)

===== Round 8 =====
5 December 2020
19:15

(1BP) Glasgow Warriors (Scotland)	22–23	(Wales) Dragons
Try: Fotu Lokotui; Sean Kennedy; Johnny Matthews; Con: Peter Horne (2); Pen: Peter Horne	Preview; Report; Report; Report	Try: Jared Rosser; Brok Harris; Con: Sam Davies (2); Pen: Sam Davies (2); Drop: Sam Davies

Scotstoun Stadium
Attendance: 0
Referee: Chris Busby (IRFU)

===== Round 10 – 1872 Cup 1st leg =====
2 January 2021
15:00

Edinburgh (Scotland)	10–7	(Scotland) Glasgow Warriors (1BP)
Try: Magnus Bradbury; Con: Jaco van der Walt; Pen: Jaco van der Walt	Preview; Report; Report; Report	Try: Lewis Bean; Con: Ross Thompson

Murrayfield Stadium
Attendance: 0
Referee: Sam Grove-White (SRU)

===== Round 9 – 1872 Cup 2nd leg =====
16 January 2021 (postponed)
17:15

Glasgow Warriors (Scotland)	23–22	(Scotland) Edinburgh (1BP)
Try: Matt Fagerson; George Turner; Con: Ross Thompson (2); Pen: Ross Thompson (3)	Preview; Report; Report; Report	Try: Jamie Farndale; Chris Dean; Eroni Sau; Con: Jaco van der Walt; Mark Bennett; Pen: Jaco van der Walt

Scotstoun Stadium
Attendance: 0
Referee: Mike Adamson (SRU)

===== Round 11 =====
13 February 2020 (postponed)
14:30

Glasgow Warriors (Scotland)	v	(Italy) Benetton Treviso
	Postponement

Scotstoun Stadium

===== Round 12 =====
19 February 2021
19:35

(1BP) Glasgow Warriors (Scotland)	13–19	(Ireland) Ulster
Try: Aki Seiuli; Con: Ross Thompson; Pen: Adam Hastings	Preview; Report; Report; Report	Try: Michael Lowry; Craig Gilroy; Nick Timoney; Con: John Cooney (2)

Scotstoun Stadium
Attendance: 0
Referee: Ben Blain (SRU)

===== Round 13 =====
28 February 2021
17:30

(1BP) Leinster (Ireland)	40–21	(Scotland) Glasgow Warriors
Try: Harry Byrne; Penalty try Scott Penny (2); Luke McGrath; Cian Kelleher; Con: Harry Byrne (2); David Hawkshaw (2)	Preview; Report; Report; Report	Try: Thomas Gordon; Rufus McLean; Huw Jones; Con: Adam Hastings; Ross Thompson (2)

RDS Arena
Attendance: 0
Referee: Frank Murphy (IRFU)

===== Round 14 =====
6 March 2021
13:00

Zebre (Italy)	20–31	(Scotland) Glasgow Warriors (1BP)
Try: Mattia Bellini (2); Con: Paolo Pescetto (2); Pen: Paolo Pescetto (2)	Preview; Report; Report; Report	Try: Ross Thompson; Jamie Dobie; Thomas Gordon; Nick Grigg; Con: Ross Thompson; Ian Keatley (3); Pen: Ross Thompson

Stadio Sergio Lanfranchi
Attendance: 0
Referee: Andrea Piardi (IRF)

===== Round 15 =====
12 March 2020
20:00

Glasgow Warriors (Scotland)	30–25	(Wales) Ospreys (1BP)
Try: Lee Jones; Rufus McLean; Aki Seiuli; Con: Ross Thompson (3); Pen: Ross Thompson (3)	Preview; Report; Report; Report	Try: Morgan Morris; Penalty try Gareth Evans; Con: Luke Price; Pen: Luke Price (2)

Scotstoun Stadium
Attendance: 0
Referee: Sam Grove-White (SRU)

===== Round 16 =====
21 March 2021
15:00

Dragons (Wales)	26-17	(Scotland) Glasgow Warriors
Try: Jordan Williams; Matthew Screech; Con: Sam Davies (2); Pen: Sam Davies (4)	Preview; Report; Report; Report	Try: Fraser Brown; Rufus McLean; Con: Adam Hastings (2); Pen: Adam Hastings

Millennium Stadium
Attendance: 0
Referee: Dan Jones (WRU)

===== Round 11 rescheduled =====
27 March 2021
13:45

(1BP) Glasgow Warriors (Scotland)	46–25	(Italy) Benetton (1BP)
Try: Fotu Lokotui; Nick Grigg; Nikola Matawalu; George Horne; TJ Ioane; Johnny Matthews; Con: Ross Thompson (4); Ian Keatley; Pen: Ross Thompson (2)	Preview; Report; Report; Report	Try: Gianmarco Lucchesi; Riccardo Favretto; Marco Zanon; Corniel Els; Con: Edoardo Padovani; Pen: Edoardo Padovani

Scotstoun Stadium
Attendance: 0
Referee: Frank Murphy (IRFU)

=== Europe ===
==== Champions Cup ====
Glasgow Warriors began the European campaign in the European Champions Cup for a 13th consecutive season. They were paired with Exeter Chiefs and Lyon in Pool B. The pairing with Exeter meant that Glasgow would line up with against its departed players; the centurions Glasgow Warrior No. 191 Stuart Hogg and Glasgow Warrior No. 216 Jonny Gray; an ex-captain of the club.

The COVID-19-pandemic affected season was to hurt the Warriors. The first tie was with Exeter Chiefs; and was Glasgow Warrior's 130th European Champions Cup match. England was in the grip of the worst COVID-19 deaths in Europe and the Chiefs team unbeknownst to them was affected with the virus. The Exeter side won the match, but 20 out of the 23 matchday Warriors players were forced to isolate after contracting coronavirus from the English players on the pitch. Head coach Danny Wilson was frustrated with the Warriors display: "We talked all week about how important our discipline was going to be against Exeter, and then we give away 10 penalties in the first half-hour. That led to us being 14 points down despite having the wind at our backs, so when they’ve got the wind they’re just going to pin you in your 22. If you give a side like Exeter that many opportunities they’ll punish you, and they hurt us really badly with that today."

Owing to the Warriors players isolating with COVID-19, the club could not then field a side to play against Lyon and were handed a 28–0 loss by the EPCR, giving Lyon the five points for a bonus-point victory.

Shortly after this the French Government cancelled all matches by the French teams; and the competition was suspended.

It is set to continue but with two losses Glasgow Warriors will instead resume their European campaign in the Challenge Cup.

===== Pool =====
Team	P	W	D	L	PF	PA	Diff	TF	TA	TB	LB	Pts
(France) Lyon	2	2	0	0	83	10	+73	12	1	1	0	10
(France) Racing 92	2	2	0	0	75	29	+46	11	4	2	0	10
(France) Toulouse	2	2	0	0	57	22	+35	8	3	2	0	10
(Ireland) Munster	2	2	0	0	60	38	+22	5	5	0	0	8
(France) Clermont	2	1	0	1	82	77	+5	11	8	2	0	6
(England) Bristol Bears	2	1	0	1	65	69	-4	9	9	2	0	6
(England) Exeter Chiefs	2	1	0	1	42	28	+14	6	4	1	0	5
(England) Gloucester	2	1	0	1	48	89	-41	6	12	1	0	5
(Ireland) Ulster	2	0	0	2	56	67	-11	7	9	1	2	3
(Ireland) Connacht	2	0	0	2	40	53	-13	5	8	0	1	1
(England) Harlequins	2	0	0	2	14	70	-56	2	9	0	0	0
(Scotland) Glasgow Warriors	2	0	0	2	0	70	-70	0	10	0	0	0

===== Results =====
====== Round 1 ======
13 December 2020
15:15

(1 BP) Exeter Chiefs (England)	42–0	(Scotland) Glasgow Warriors
Try: S. Simmonds 13' c Gray 24' c Hogg 42' c Yeandle 54' c Woodburn 66' c Hill 80'+2 c Con: J. Simmonds (6/6) 15', 24', 43', 55', 68', 80'+3	Preview; Report; Report; Report

Sandy Park
Attendance: 2,000
Referee: Mathieu Raynal (France)

====== Round 2 ======
19 December 2020
13:00

Glasgow Warriors (Scotland)	Cancelled; 0–28	(France) Lyon (1 BP)
	Cancellation	Try: Penalty try (4)

Scostoun
Referee: Karl Dickson (England)

==== Challenge Cup ====
Glasgow Warriors were drawn against Montpeillier in the Challenge Cup. As a Champions Cup side they joined the Challenge Cup in the last 16 stage. If they won that tie they would progress to a home quarter-final tie against the winners of the Benetton vs Agen match.

Unfortunately for the Warriors, the French side won out in a tight match, ending the Glasgow side's involvement in the tournament. For much of second half, Glasgow played with 14 men, after TJ Ioane was red-carded for a dangerous tackle on Montpelier's Yvan Reilhac. Ioane was to receive a 5 match ban.

===== Results =====
====== Last 16 ======
2 April 2021
20:00

Montpellier (France)	26–21	(Scotland) Glasgow Warriors
Try: Guilhem Guirado; Anthony Bouthier; Con: Alex Lozowski (2); Pen: Alex Lozowski (4)	Preview; Report; Report; Report	Pen: Adam Hastings (5); Ross Thompson (2)

GGL Stadium
Referee: Karl Dickson (England)

=== Rainbow Cup ===
The Rainbow Cup was introduced this season as a precursor to inviting 4 South African Super Rugby Unlocked franchises to the Pro14 set-up. The South African sides Vodacom Bulls, Emirates Lions, Cell C Sharks and DHL Stormers were invited to a tournament with the remaining 12 northern hemisphere Pro14 sides. Former Pro14 sides Cheetahs and the Kings were noticeably absent: the Cheetahs were one of 3 remaining Super Rugby Unlocked franchises not invited, the others being the Griquas and the Pumas. The Kings had gone into voluntary liquidation in September 2020.

The original plan was for the European sides to play three matches against each other, the South African sides to play three matches against one another, and then the following three rounds would be European sides playing South African sides. This format was scrapped due to the coronavirus pandemic which still affected travel. A re-jigged format was then implemented. The European sides would play five matches against one another; the South African sides would play against one another; and the European group winners would play off against the South African group winners in a final. The Pro14 announced that the Rainbow Cup final would take place in Treviso, Italy.

With now only five matches instead of six, each of the European sides were given a bye in one of the rounds. Glasgow Warriors bye was in Round 6.

==== Table ====
Pro14 Rainbow Cup
	Team	P	W	D	L	PF	PA	PD	TF	TA	Try bonus	Losing bonus	Pts
1	(Italy) Benetton	5	4	1	0	125	78	+47	14	10	2	0	22**
2	(Ireland) Munster	5	4	0	1	170	75	+95	23	8	3	1	20
3	(Scotland) Glasgow Warriors	5	4	0	1	121	117	+4	17	15	3	0	19
4	(Ireland) Leinster	5	3	0	2	124	87	+37	19	10	2	1	15
5	(Wales) Cardiff Blues	5	3	0	2	124	123	+1	16	16	2	1	15
6	(Ireland) Connacht	5	3	0	2	109	133	–24	15	18	2	0	14
7	(Wales) Scarlets	5	1	2	2	110	115	–5	13	15	2	1	13*
8	(Wales) Ospreys	5	2	1	2	103	88	+15	14	11	2	1	11**
9	(Scotland) Edinburgh	5	1	1	3	126	140	–14	18	19	2	2	10
10	(Ireland) Ulster	5	1	1	3	85	116	–31	12	18	2	2	8*
11	(Wales) Dragons	5	1	0	4	117	156	–39	14	22	2	1	7
12	(Italy) Zebre	5	0	0	5	88	174	-86	10	23	0	3	3
* Cancelled fixture: Scarlets awarded four match points. ** Cancelled fixture: Benetton awarded four match points.
If teams are level at any stage, tiebreakers are applied in the following order: 1. number of matches won; 2. the difference between points for and points against; 3. the number of tries scored; 4. the most points scored; 5. the difference between tries for and tries against; 6. the fewest red cards received; 7. the fewest yellow cards received.
Green background (row 1) is the play-off places and earn a place in the final against the 1st placed Rainbow Cup SA team.

==== Results ====
===== Round 1 =====
24 April 2021
13:00

(1BP) Benetton (Italy)	46–19	(Scotland) Glasgow Warriors
Try: Monty Ioane; Niccolò Cannone (2); Toa Halafihi; Michele Lamaro; Gianmarco Lucchesi; Con: Paolo Garbisi (5); Pen: Paolo Garbisi; Edoardo Padovani	Preview; Report; Report; Report	Try: Cole Forbes; Ian Keatley; Nick Grigg; Con: Ian Keatley (2)

Stadio Comunale di Monigo
Attendance: 0
Referee: Marius Mitrea (IRF)

===== Round 2 – 1872 Cup 3rd leg =====
8 May 2021
20:15

(1BP) Glasgow Warriors (Scotland)	29–19	(Scotland) Edinburgh
Try: Cole Forbes; Fotu Lokotui; Fraser Brown; Kyle Steyn; Con: Ross Thompson (3); Pen: Ross Thompson	Preview; Report; Report; Report	Try: Dave Cherry; Pierre Schoeman; Stuart McInally; Con: Nathan Chamberlain (2)

Scotstoun Stadium
Attendance: 0
Referee: Adam Jones (WRU)

===== Round 3 =====
15 May 2021
19:35

(1BP) Edinburgh (Scotland)	24–31	(Scotland) Glasgow Warriors (1BP)
Try: Chris Dean; Mike Willemse; Charlie Shiel; Con: Blair Kinghorn (3); Pen: Blair Kinghorn	Preview; Report; Report; Report	Try: Matt Fagerson; George Turner; Adam Hastings; George Horne; Con: Ross Thompson (4); Pen: Ross Thompson

Murrayfield Stadium
Attendance: 0
Referee: Andrew Brace (IRFU)

===== Round 4 =====
29 May 2021
19:35

Dragons (Wales)	16–27	(Scotland) Glasgow Warriors (1BP)
Try: Aneurin Owen; Con: Sam Davies; Pen: Sam Davies (2); Drop: Sam Davies	Preview; Report; Report; Report	Try: Kyle Steyn; Ross Thompson; George Turner; Kiran McDonald; Con: Ross Thompson (2); Pen: Ross Thompson

Cardiff City Stadium
Attendance: 0
Referee: Chris Busby (IRFU)

===== Round 5 =====
5 June 2021
20:15

Glasgow Warriors (Scotland)	15–12	(Ireland) Leinster
	Preview; Report; Report; Report

Scotstoun Stadium
Attendance: 0
Referee: Frank Murphy (IRFU)

===== Round 6 =====
12 June 2021

Bye

== Warrior of the month awards ==
Award	Winner
September	No award
October	(Scotland) Huw Jones
November	(Scotland) Glenn Bryce
December	(Scotland) Ryan Wilson
January	(Scotland) Richie Gray
February	(Scotland) Jamie Dobie
March	(Scotland) Ross Thompson
April	(New Zealand) Cole Forbes
May	(Scotland) Rory Darge

== End-of-season awards ==
In a year hit by the COVID-19 pandemic and no domestic rugby played in Scotland outwith the international teams and Glasgow Warriors and Edinburgh Rugby, the Community Club of the Season award was replaced by a Community Hero of the Year Award, which was sponsored by SP Energy Networks. Instead of an awards dinner, the awards were notified online throughout the week on social media.

Award	Winner
Young Player of the Season	(Scotland) Ross Thompson
Coaches Award	(Scotland) Kyle Steyn
Test Player of the Season	(Scotland) George Turner
Most Improved Player of the Season	(Argentina) Enrique Pieretto
Al Kellock Leadership Award	(Scotland) Ryan Wilson
Community Hero of the Year	(Scotland) David Parr, Paisley RFC
Try of the Season	(Scotland) Rufus McLean vs. (Wales) Dragons
Players' Player of the Season	(Scotland) Ryan Wilson
Player of the Season	(Scotland) Ross Thompson

== List of competitive debuts ==
A player's nationality shown is taken from the nationality at the highest honour for the national side obtained; or if never capped internationally their place of birth. Senior caps take precedence over junior caps or place of birth; junior caps take precedence over place of birth. A player's nationality at debut may be different from the nationality shown. Combination sides like the British and Irish Lions or Pacific Islanders are not national sides, or nationalities.

Players in BOLD font have been capped by their senior international XV side as nationality shown.

Players in Italic font have capped either by their international 7s side; or by the international XV 'A' side as nationality shown.

Players in normal font have not been capped at senior level.

A position in parentheses indicates that the player debuted as a substitute. A player may have made a prior debut for Glasgow Warriors in a non-competitive match, 'A' match or 7s match; these matches are not listed.

Tournaments where competitive debut made:

**Scottish Inter-District Championship**	**Welsh–Scottish League**	**WRU Challenge Cup**	**Celtic League**	**Celtic Cup**	**1872 Cup**	**Pro12**	**Pro14**	**Rainbow Cup**	**United Rugby Championship**	**European Challenge Cup**	**Heineken Cup / European Champions Cup**

Crosshatching indicates a jointly hosted match.

Number	Player nationality	Name	Position	Date of debut	Venue	Stadium	Opposition nationality	Opposition side	Tournament	Match result	Scoring debut
314	(Tonga)	**Fotu Lokotui**	(Flanker)	2020-10-03	Away	Galway Sportsgrounds	(Ireland)	Connacht	Pro14	Loss	Nil
315	(Scotland)	Hamish Bain	Lock	2020-10-24	Away	Liberty Stadium	(Wales)	Ospreys	Pro14	Loss	Nil
316	(Samoa)	**TJ Ioane**	No. 8	2020-10-24	Away	Liberty Stadium	(Wales)	Ospreys	Pro14	Loss	Nil
317	(England)	Lewis Bean	(Lock)	2020-11-09	Away	Ravenhill Stadium	(Ireland)	Ulster	Pro14	Loss	Nil
318	(Netherlands)	**Caleb Korteweg**	(Scrum half)	2020-11-09	Away	Ravenhill Stadium	(Ireland)	Ulster	Pro14	Loss	Nil
319	(Scotland)	**Ross Thompson**	(Fly half)	2021-01-02	Away	Murrayfield Stadium	(Scotland)	Edinburgh	1872 Cup	Loss	2 pts
320	(Scotland)	**Rufus McLean**	Wing	2021-01-16	Home	Scotstoun Stadium	(Scotland)	Edinburgh	1872 Cup	Win	Nil
321	(Scotland)	**Ollie Smith**	(Wing)	2021-01-16	Home	Scotstoun Stadium	(Scotland)	Edinburgh	1872 Cup	Win	Nil
322	(England)	James Scott	(Lock)	2021-02-19	Home	Scotstoun Stadium	(Ireland)	Ulster	Pro14	Loss	Nil
323	(New Zealand)	Cole Forbes	Wing	2021-02-28	Away	RDS Arena	(Ireland)	Leinster	Pro14	Loss	Nil
324	(Scotland)	Gregor Brown	(Flanker)	2021-02-28	Away	RDS Arena	(Ireland)	Leinster	Pro14	Loss	Nil
325	(Ireland)	**Ian Keatley**	(Fly half)	2021-03-06	Away	Stadio Sergio Lanfranchi	(Italy)	Zebre	Pro14	Win	6 pts
326	(Australia)	Jordan Lenac	(Scrum half)	2021-03-27	Home	Scotstoun Stadium	(Italy)	Benetton Treviso	Pro14	Win	Nil
327	(Scotland)	Tom Lambert	(Prop)	2021-04-24	Away	Stadio Comunale di Monigo	(Italy)	Benetton Treviso	Rainbow Cup	Loss	Nil
328	(Scotland)	**Rory Darge**	(Flanker)	2021-04-24	Away	Stadio Comunale di Monigo	(Italy)	Benetton Treviso	Rainbow Cup	Loss	Nil
329	(Wales)	Brad Thyer	Prop	2021-09-24	Away	Ravenhill Stadium	(Ireland)	Ulster	United Rugby Championship	Loss	Nil
330	(Scotland)	**Simon Berghan**	Prop	2021-09-24	Away	Ravenhill Stadium	(Ireland)	Ulster	United Rugby Championship	Loss	Nil
331	(Scotland)	**Jack Dempsey**	No. 8	2021-09-24	Away	Ravenhill Stadium	(Ireland)	Ulster	United Rugby Championship	Loss	Nil
332	(Scotland)	**Sione Tuipulotu**	Centre	2021-09-24	Away	Ravenhill Stadium	(Ireland)	Ulster	United Rugby Championship	Loss	Nil
333	(Scotland)	**Murray McCallum**	(Prop)	2021-09-24	Away	Ravenhill Stadium	(Ireland)	Ulster	United Rugby Championship	Loss	Nil
334	(Scotland)	**Murphy Walker**	(Prop)	2021-10-02	Home	Scotstoun Stadium	(South Africa)	Sharks	United Rugby Championship	Win	Nil
335	(Scotland)	Ally Miller	(Flanker)	2021-10-02	Home	Scotstoun Stadium	(South Africa)	Sharks	United Rugby Championship	Win	Nil
336	(Argentina)	**Sebastián Cancelliere**	Wing	2021-10-16	Away	Stadio Sergio Lanfranchi	(Italy)	Zebre	United Rugby Championship	Win	Nil
337	(South Africa)	Nathan McBeth	(Prop)	2021-11-27	Away	Stadio Comunale di Monigo	(Italy)	Benetton Treviso	United Rugby Championship	Loss	Nil
338	(New Zealand)	Josh McKay	Full back	2021-12-04	Home	Scotstoun Stadium	(Wales)	Dragons	United Rugby Championship	Win	Nil
339	(Argentina)	**Domingo Miotti**	(Fly-half)	2021-12-04	Home	Scotstoun Stadium	(Wales)	Dragons	United Rugby Championship	Win	Nil
340	(Tonga)	**Walter Fifita**	(Wing)	2022-01-08	Home	Scotstoun Stadium	(Wales)	Ospreys	United Rugby Championship	Win	Nil
