= Bishop of Hereford's Bluecoat School =

The Bishop of Hereford's Bluecoat School

Location
- Hampton Dene Road, Tupsley; Hereford, Herefordshire; England; 52.057511°N 2.682896°W

Information
- Type: Voluntary aided Comprehensive school
- Motto: Semper Christo Fidelis
- Religious affiliation: Church of England
- Established: 1973
- Local authority: Herefordshire
- Department for Education URN: 116991 Tables
- Ofsted: Reports
- Gender: Co-educational
- Age: 11 to 16
- Enrolment: 1,180
- Houses: Ashley, Cheshire, Livingstone and Shaftesbury
- Website: http://www.bhbs.hereford.sch.uk/

The Bishop of Hereford's Bluecoat School (BHBS) is a mixed comprehensive secondary school in the Tupsley district of Hereford, England. It is a voluntary aided school, which takes children from the age of 11 through to the age of 16. It is a Church of England school and is administered by the Hereford Diocese. The current Headteacher of the school is Tom Williams..

The school is divided into four houses, which are named after Christian campaigners. The houses are Ashley, Cheshire, Livingstone and Shaftesbury.

== History ==
The school was formed in 1973, which was the year that Herefordshire switched from the tripartite system to a comprehensive education system. The new comprehensive school was formed by the merger of two Church of England secondary modern schools; the Bishop's School, founded in 1958, and the Bluecoat foundation, which dated back to 1710. In 1983 BHBS joined the Woodard Corporation group of Church of England schools.

In September 1997 the Department for Education and Skills (DfES) awarded the school specialist school status as a Technology College. The school was also awarded a further specialism in Languages and was among the first schools to receive training school status in 2000.

== Headteachers ==
- Peter Baker 1958–1978 (Bishop's School 1958–1973)
- John Chapman 1978–1986
- Andrew Marson 1986–2007
- Sara Catlow-Hawkins 2007–2018
- Martin Henton 2018–2024
- Tom Williams 2024–present

== Notable former pupils ==
- Scott Bemand, rugby union player
- Angela Tooby, Olympic athlete
- Susan Tooby, Olympic athlete
- Rose Ellen Dix, YouTuber
- Beth Healey, medical doctor
- James Scott, rugby union player
- Guy Thompson, rugby union player
- Laura Keates rugby union player
- Ollie Frost, rugby union player

== Music ==
The school has achieved four Artsmark Gold Awards for its Arts provision. It employs twenty-four peripatetic instrumental staff who teach nearly 300 pupils who are regularly entered for National Music Grades (213 pupils have passed a grade, with a quarter of pupils achieving grade 4 – diploma standard) Specialist professional instrumentalists lead 24 instrumental ensembles which include a Concert Band, Brass Band, Sax Choir, Guitar Group, Orchestra, Viol Consort, Steel Pans, String Ensembles, Ceilidh Band, Flutes Ensembles, Boys Woodwind Quartet, Keyboard Group, guitar group, boys choir, girls choir, a chamber choir, a Parent Staff Choir, a soul band and a Japanese Koto Group.

The school's concert programme has included recent performances by its Chamber Choir in Morocco, instrumentalists and singers performing in Symphony Hall and the Royal Albert Hall as well as in Lichfield, Hereford and Worcester Cathedrals. It performs in the BBC Herefordshire Musicians showcase and achieves numerous accolades from Herefordshire Festival each year.

The school is also an Arts Award Centre, which runs the bronze and silver award as part of its fast track music provision as well as early entry at AS-level.

== Sport ==
The school's most notable sport is rugby union. Teams between Under 12 and Under 16 are fielded most weeks during the winter and spring terms.

The school has achieved a high standard in the Under 15 Daily Mail Cup. Recently reaching the last 32 of the competition three times in five years. The school's best result in the competition was in 2007, when they reached the semi-finals, where they lost to eventual runners-up St Paul's School. The school organises regular tours, and have toured South Africa, New Zealand, France and Canada.

In 2011 the Hereford Times reported that Herefordshire Council were in discussions with developers who wanted to purchase the school's sports field to build 100 houses.

== Technology ==
The school provides one SMART board and/or projector for every classroom which allows teachers to display a computer feed to the students and interact with it using the SMART board pens. (In classrooms that also have SMART Boards)

The school also have specific areas, such as the recently built 'Learning Hub', which contains around 100 computers that students can use during both break-time and lesson time. The school also provide laptops which can be used in lessons per teacher request, so that students can use Internet resources to complete research tasks.

On 10 November 2022 the school was the target of a cyber attack that led to pupils' information being published online.
