= Guy Thompson =

English rugby union player

- Born: Guy Edwin Peter Thompson; 23 January 1987 (age 39) Hereford, England
- Height: 6 ft 1 in (185 cm)
- Weight: 233 lb (106 kg)
- School: Bishop of Hereford's Bluecoat School; Bromsgrove School
- University: University of Wales Institute, Cardiff

Rugby union career
- Position(s): Flanker, Number 8, Centre
- Current team: Jersey Reds
Senior career
Years	Team	Apps	(Points)
2010–11	Richmond F.C.	18	(95)
2011–13	Jersey Reds	49	(125)
2013–18	Wasps RFC	100	(120)
2018–2020	Leicester Tigers	33	(30)
2020–2021	Ealing Trailfinders	11	(20)
2021–2022	Jersey Reds	9	(20)
2010–2022	Total	220	(410)
- Correct as of 25 May 2022

Guy Edwin Peter Thompson (born 23 January 1987) is an English retired rugby union player. He played flanker or number 8. Between 2013 and 2018 Thompson played 100 times for Wasps and has also previously played for Leicester Tigers in Premiership Rugby, Richmond F.C., in National League 2 South, Ealing Trailfinders and Jersey Reds in the RFU Championship.

== Career ==
=== Early life ===
Born in Hereford and raised by a single mother Thompson attended Bishop's School in Hereford before going to Bromsgrove School, alongside future Wasps teammate Matt Mullan.

After graduating from University of Wales Institute, Cardiff Thompson joined Gloucester on an academy contract, after one season he left the club without playing a game and spent time traveling. Returning to Hereford Thompson then moved to London for work and joined Richmond F.C. in 2010.

=== Professional rugby ===
A successful season at Richmond saw Thompson offered the chance to become a full-time professional again with Jersey Reds, then in National League 1. Thompson helped Jersey in promotion to the RFU Championship in his first season and then secure survival at that level in his second year. Thompson was Jersey's top try scorer in both seasons on the island.

On 10 May 2013 it was announced Thompson would be joining London Wasps in the Premiership.

After five seasons at Wasps, including the move from High Wycombe to Coventry, Thompson signed for Leicester Tigers on 26 January 2018 with the move to happen in the summer of 2018.

Thompson made his Leicester debut as a replacement on 8 September 2018 in a 48–33 win for Leicester against Newcastle Falcons. On 19 April 2019 Thompson scored twice and provided the final pass for another try as Leicester beat Newcastle Falcons to avoid what would have been relegation for the first time in club history. During the season to that point Leicester's record with Thompson was six wins from 10 games, and their record without him was one win from nine games. He was voted as the club's newcomer of the year award for the 2018–19 season.

On 11 June 2020, Thompson left Leicester Tigers to join RFU Championship side Ealing Trailfinders from the 2020–21 season. After one season with Ealing Thompson re-joined Jersey Reds, also in the Championship.

Thompson announced his retirement from rugby on 28 April 2022.
