= Ryan Wilson (rugby union) =

Scotland international rugby union player

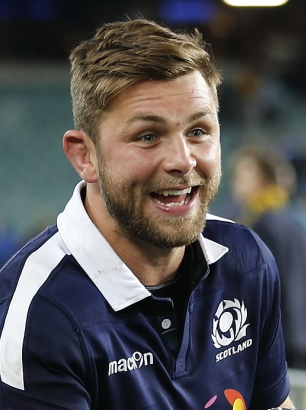
- Wilson in 2017
- Born: Ryan Wilson; 18 May 1989 (age 37) Aldershot, England
- Height: 1.91 m (6 ft 3 in)
- Weight: 105 kg (16 st 7 lb; 231 lb)
- School: Lord Wandsworth College; Frensham Heights School

Rugby union career
- Position(s): Number 8, Flanker
Amateur team(s)
Years	Team	Apps	(Points)
- Moseley
Senior career
Years	Team	Apps	(Points)
2010–23	Glasgow Warriors	222	(50)
International career
Years	Team	Apps	(Points)
2009	Scotland U20	5	(0)
2011–	Scotland A	1	
2013–2020	Scotland	50	(0)
- Correct as of 25 September 2021

Ryan Wilson (born 18 May 1989) is a British rugby union player. He played for Glasgow Warriors as a loose forward. Born in Aldershot in England, he qualifies for Scotland through his maternal grandparents. He made his debut for Scotland in 2013 and has won 50 caps. He is a double centurion for Glasgow Warriors with 222 caps.

== Rugby Union career ==
=== Amateur career ===
Wilson attended Frensham Heights School in Surrey, a private secondary school that did not field a rugby union team. During his time at Frensham, Wilson proved to be adept at football, and played in the school's first XI for two years.

Having played mini and junior rugby at Farnham RUFC in Surrey, he spent a 'happy year' at Moseley.

Wilson was drafted to Marr in the Scottish Premiership for the 2017–18 season. He was drafted to Stirling County for the 2018–19 season.

=== Professional career ===
Wilson joined Glasgow Warriors from Moseley in 2010. He made his competitive debut against Leinster at Firhill Stadium on 3 September 2010. The Warriors won the match 22-19. He became Glasgow Warrior No. 183. He was part of the side that won the 2015 Pro12. He was made captain of the club for the 2017–18 season.

He then co-captained the side, first with Callum Gibbins, and then with Fraser Brown. Wilson won the Al Kellock Leadership award three times; in season 2018-19 and again in 2019-20 and 2020-21. He won Warrior of the month in December 2021; and won the Players' Player of the Season award in the 2020-21 season. He was released by the club in the summer of 2023. Wilson said:

I'm so proud to have had the opportunity to represent this club. We've been so lucky to have some unbelievable players come through, but some even better men. I've been through some very low lows and some exceptional highs, and I'm incredibly thankful to have had Bex and the kids with me through them all. Winning the title is definitely right up there with the greatest memories in my time here. It had been such a massive journey to get to that point – make the semis but lose, then make the semis and win, then the final in Dublin that we lost, then finally the semi-final win over Ulster and that final victory over Munster in 2015. Everything clicked that day. I'll never forget it. If people look back and realise how much I've poured into the jersey every time, then I'll be a happy man.

=== International career ===
Wilson represented Scotland A, Scotland under-20 and Scotland under-19.Wilson was also capped 50 times for the Scotland National team.

Wilson was involved in an incident in the tunnel before the England vs Scotland match on Saturday 24 February 2018.

Wilson was found guilty of punching a fellow player in a fast food shop in Glasgow while he was dressed as Batman in 2015.
