= James Scott (rugby union) =

English rugby union player (born 1999)

- Born: James Joseph Scott; 18 June 1999 (age 27) Solihull, England
- Height: 1.97 m (6 ft 6 in)
- Weight: 117 kg (18 st 6 lb)
- School: Bishop of Hereford's Bluecoat School; Malvern College

Rugby union career
- Position: Lock
- Current team: Anthem RC
Senior career
Years	Team	Apps	(Points)
2017–2022	Worcester Warriors	12	(5)
2017-2018	→ Luctonians	9	(5)
2017–2020	→ Worcester Cavaliers	20	(10)
2018–2021	→ Hartpury University	21	(5)
2021 (LOAN)	→ Glasgow Warriors	4	(0)
2022-2023	Jersey Reds	22	(20)
2023-2025	Chicago Hounds	34	(25)
2026-	Anthem Rugby Carolina	3	
- Correct as of 8 September 2026
International career
Years	Team	Apps	(Points)
2015	England U16s	1	
2016	England U17s	2	
2017	England U18s	9	(5)
2018-2019	England U20s	15	(10)
- Correct as of 18 November 2022

James Scott (born 18 June 1999) is an English rugby union player who plays for Anthem RC in Major League Rugby. His main position is lock.

== Early life ==
Scott joined the Worcester Warriors academy at Under 15 level and represented Herefordshire County. He was selected for North Midlands, and went on to represent Midlands at the BMW Wellington International Festival in 2015. He then joined the Warriors full time in 2017, shortly after finishing his education at Malvern College.

== Club career ==
Scott signed as a senior academy prospect, and went on to play regularly for Worcester Cavaliers in the Premiership Rugby Shield, Scott also furthered his development by playing for Luctonians in National 2, then Hartpury University in the RFU Championship, both on a dual registration.

He made his first-team debut from off the bench in a European Rugby Challenge Cup match against Stade Français Paris back in October 2018. It was followed up with another against Pau in December 2018.

Scott made his first start in the opening Premiership Rugby Cup match against Leicester Tigers in September 2019. He played in three European Challenge Cup matches during the season and made his Premiership debut when he started against Wasps in August 2020. Following this, Scott signed his first senior squad contract to stay with Worcester at Sixways Stadium.

He joined Glasgow Warriors on 18 February 2021 on a 6 week loan deal. He was named on the bench for Glasgow for their Pro14 match the following night against Ulster, coming on in the 63rd minute to become Glasgow Warrior No.322. He went on to feature in 3 other matches, against Benetton, Zebre and Ospreys before returning to Sixways.

On 16 June 2022, Scott was released by Worcester as he signs for Jersey Reds in the RFU Championship in the 2022-23 season. The Reds started the season with pre season matches against Leicester Tigers, London Irish and Bath Rugby with Scott featuring in all 3. He went on to make 22 appearances during this season, in which they won the RFU Championship.

Following Jersey Reds demise in September 2023, he was announced as a new signing for Chicago Hounds. In the following two MLR seasons, he went on to start in all 34 of the matches he featured in for the team, playing a major role to help them reach consecutive Eastern Conference Finals.

During his 2 seasons there, he attained 6 MLR team of the week accolades, and gained ALL-MLR Second XV honours in both years. In the 2025 season, he finished 9th in the league for tackles, completing 209.

== International career ==
Scott represented England from U16s to 20 levels. His first appearance coming in 2015, following the BMW Festival at Wellington. He played across both years of college at U17 and u18 level, featuring in the U18 International Series in 2017 in Wales.

Scott was a member of the England U20s side that finished 2nd in the 2018 Six Nations Under 20s Championship. Also featuring in all of their games at the 2018 World Rugby Under 20 Championship later that year. He was ever-present for England in the 2019 Six Nations Under 20s Championship.

== Honours ==
Worcester Warriors

- Premiership Cup Winner 2021-22 season

Jersey Reds

- Championship Rugby Winner 2022-23 season
- Championship Cup Runner up 2022-23 season

Chicago Hounds

- MLR Team of the Week: 2024 – Rd 6
- MLR Team of the Week: 2024 – Rd 18
- All Major League Rugby Second team (2024)
- MLR Team of the Week: 2025 – Rd 2
- MLR Team of the Week: 2025 – Rd 7
- MLR Team of the Week: 2025 – Rd 8
- MLR Team of the Week: 2025 – Rd 17
- All Major League Rugby Second team (2025)
