= Jordan Lenac =

Australian rugby union player

- Born: Jordan Lenac; 4 September 1997 (age 29) Australia
- Height: 1.78 m (5 ft 10 in)
- Weight: 87 kg (13 st 10 lb)
- School: The Southport School
- University: University of Queensland Bond University
- Notable relative: Tom Helm (great-grandfather)

Rugby union career
- Position: Scrum-half
- Current team: Bond University
Senior career
Years	Team	Apps	(Points)
2021-2022	Glasgow Warriors	2	(0)
- Correct as of 27 March 2021
Super Rugby
Years	Team	Apps	(Points)
2019-21, 2021-22	Ayrshire Bulls	27	(38)
International career
Years	Team	Apps	(Points)
2024	Croatia	2	(0)

Jordan Lenac is an Australian rugby union player who played for the Glasgow Warriors in the United Rugby Championship. Lenac's primary position is scrum-half. Lenac also represented the Ayrshire Bulls in the Scottish Super 6 competition and most recently represented AEIS Agronomia Rugby in the Campeonato Português de Rugby competition in Portugal. In 2024, he was the recipient of the John Eales Rugby scholarship at Bond University on the Gold Coast Australia, playing for Bond University in the Queensland Premier Grade competition.

== Rugby Union career ==
=== Professional career ===
In 2017 he played for the inaugural Under 20 Queensland Reds Super Rugby side.

Lenac moved to Scotland in December 2020, joining Glasgow Warriors on a training contract. He made his Glasgow Warriors debut in the re-arranged Round 11 match against Benetton on 27 March 2021, coming on as a replacement. He was a late replacement in the match for Sean Kennedy. He became Glasgow Warrior No. 326.

In 2021 Lenac played for Ayrshire Bulls in the Scottish Fosroc Super 6 competition where he was part of the championship winning team in that year.

In 2022 Lenac joined AEIS Agronomia rugby based in Portugal playing in the national Portuguese competition.

In 2024, Lenac received the John Eales Rugby Excellence scholarship with Bond University, and is playing in the Queensland Hospital Challenge Cup competition in Australia.

=== International career ===
He has previously played for Australian Schoolboys.In 2024 Lenac was selected to play for the Croatian national rugby union team.
