= Cole Forbes =

New Zealand rugby union player

- Born: Cole Devon Forbes; 10 August 1999 (age 27) Pukekohe, New Zealand
- Height: 1.81 m (5 ft 11 in)
- Weight: 91 kg (14 st 5 lb)

Rugby union career
- Position(s): Wing, Fullback
- Current team: Shimizu Koto Blue Sharks
Senior career
Years	Team	Apps	(Points)
2018–2026	Bay of Plenty	20	(30)
2021–2023	Glasgow Warriors	38	(55)
2024–2026	Blues	41	(45)
2026–	Shimizu Koto Blue Sharks	0	(0)
- Correct as of 15 October 2026
International career
Years	Team	Apps	(Points)
2019	New Zealand U20	3	(0)
2024–2026	Māori All Blacks	5	(5)
- Correct as of 15 October 2026

Cole Forbes (born 10 August 1999) is a New Zealand rugby union player and plays for Bay of Plenty and the Shimizu Koto Blue Sharks in the Japan Rugby League One. He played for Glasgow Warriors in the United Rugby Championship (URC) between 2021 and 2023. Forbes' primary position is wing or fullback.

== Professional career ==
Forbes was played for Bay of Plenty in the Mitre 10 Cup from 2018 to 2020. He credits ex-Glasgow Warrior Hugh Blake, who was a teammate at Bay of Plenty, for the opportunity to move to Glasgow. "[Hugh] found out I had Scottish grandparents. He set the groundwork for me and went to find out if anyone would be keen to take me on. The three-month trial came up with Glasgow and things went better than I thought. It was always on my mind to play in Scotland during my career, I just never thought the opportunity would come this early." He joined Glasgow Warriors in February 2021. He is Scottish qualified.

He started for the Warriors in their match against Leinster on 28 February 2021, becoming Glasgow Warrior No. 323. He won Warrior of the Month for April 2021. He made 38 caps for the club, scoring 11 tries. He was released by the Warriors in the summer of 2023.

In October 2026, Forbes joined the Shimizu Koto Blue Sharks in Division 2 of the Japan Rugby League One (JRLO).

== International career ==
In June 2021 Forbes was called up to the Scotland squad for the Summer internationals.

== Personal life ==
Forbes is a New Zealander of Scottish and Māori descent (Ngāti Awa descent).
