= Ratu Tagive =

Australian rugby footballer

Ratu Apolosa Tagive
Personal information
- Born: Ratu Tagive; 8 April 1991 (age 35) Sydney, Australia
- Height: 1.90 m (6 ft 3 in)
- Weight: 102 kg (16 st 1 lb)

Playing information
- Position: Wing
Club
Years	Team	Pld	T	G	FG	P
2006–07	Bulldogs
2007–08	Sydney Roosters
2008–10	Bulldogs
2010–11	Wests Tigers
2011–12	Bulldogs
	Total	0	0	0	0	0

Rugby union career
- Position: Wing
Amateur team(s)
Years	Team	Apps	(Points)
2015-16	Queanbeyan Whites		
2016	Eastern Suburbs	10	(35)
2016-18	Currie		
2018-	Stirling County		
Senior career
Years	Team	Apps	(Points)
2016–	Glasgow Warriors	25	(20)
Super Rugby
Years	Team	Apps	(Points)
2014-15	Brumbies	0	(0)
- Relatives: Peni Tagive (brother)

Ratu Tagive (born Australia) is an Australian rugby union player who plays for Glasgow Warriors at the Wing position.

== Rugby League ==
Tagive played for Canterbury-Bankstown Bulldogs and Wests Tigers in the Australian NRL.

== Rugby Union ==
=== Amateur career ===
Converting to Union, Tagive played for Queanbeyan Whites in the John I Dent Cup whilst in the Brumbies extended training squad before moving on to Shute Shield side Eastern Suburbs for the 2016 season.

On his move to Scotland, Tagive turned out for Currie in the Scottish Premiership.

Tagive has been drafted to Stirling County in the Scottish Premiership for the 2018-19 season.

=== Professional career ===
He became part of the Brumbies squad, training with them from October 2014.

As a result of his performances in the premier club competitions in Canberra & Sydney, on 15 November 2016 it was announced that Tagive had joined Glasgow Warriors on a one-year deal. In an interview he stated that Glasgow Warriors became interested after former Warrior and former Eastern Suburbs teammate Steven Findlay posted a video of Tagive online. He stated that former Warrior Taqele Naiyaravoro also helped convince him to move to Glasgow.

=== International career ===
Tagive received his first call up to the senior Scotland squad on 15 January 2020 for the 2020 Six Nations Championship.

== Family ==
He is the younger brother of NRL player Peni Tagive. From a family of nine, Ratu had to work as a hotel porter in Canberra to help his mother overcome a gambling addiction.
