= TJ Ioane =

Samoa international rugby union player

- Born: Tala James Ioane; 9 May 1989 (age 37) Motootua, Samoa
- Height: 1.82 m (5 ft 11 1/2 in)
- Weight: 104 kg (16 st 5 lb)
- School: Wellington College

Rugby union career
- Position: Flanker / Number 8
Senior career
Years	Team	Apps	(Points)
2015−2018	Sale Sharks	38	(30)
2018–	London Irish	20	(15)
2020–2021	→Glasgow Warriors	15	(15)
- Correct as of 23 March 2022
Provincial / State sides
Years	Team	Apps	(Points)
2009–2010	Wellington		(0)
2011–2014	Otago	37	(50)
- Correct as of 13 October 2014
Super Rugby
Years	Team	Apps	(Points)
2013–2014	Highlanders	18	(0)
- Correct as of 2 June 2014
International career
Years	Team	Apps	(Points)
2014−	Samoa	25	(5)
- Correct as of 23 March 2022

TJ Ioane (9 May 1989 in Samoa) is a Samoa international rugby union player. He plays as a flanker for Glasgow Warriors in the Pro14 on loan from Premiership Rugby side London Irish.

== Rugby Union career ==
=== Amateur career ===
Ioane moved from Samoa to New Zealand at 8 years old.

He first played for Wellington College and then the Old Boys University side.

=== Professional career ===
He had two seasons with the Highlanders in New Zealand from 2013, before he moved to the northern hemisphere.

Ioane was signed by Sale Sharks in the summer of 2015.

After three seasons with Sale, he was released by the club and picked up by London Irish in 2018.

In October 2020, after two seasons with London Irish it was confirmed that Ioane would join Pro14 side Glasgow Warriors on loan. He made his competitive debut for the club against Ospreys at the Liberty Stadium on 24 October 2020. He became Glasgow Warrior No. 316. In Glasgow's final league match against Benetton Treviso in the 2020-21 Pro14 season, Ioane won the Player of the Match award.

=== International career ===
In 2014 he was named in Samoa national team's squad for their 2014 European tour. He debuted in Samoa's second tour match, starting at #7 against Canada.

He has represented Samoa at the 2015 and 2019 Rugby World Cups. He is known for his high work rate. Domestically, he represented Otago in the ITM Cup. He made his provincial debut in 2009 and his strong performances saw him named in the Highlanders squad for the 2013 Super Rugby season. He has international experience as well with the New Zealand schools side in 2007.
