= Walter Fifita =

New Zealand rugby union player

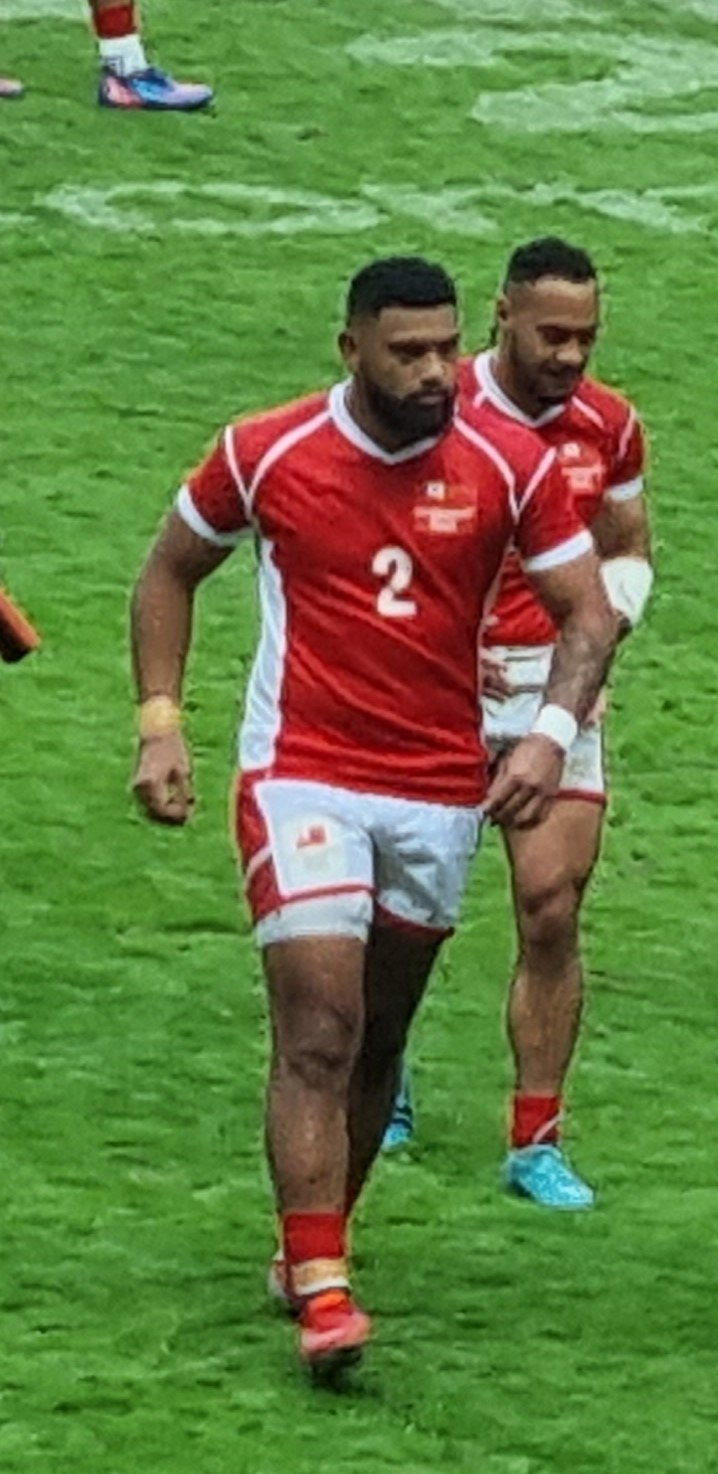
- Born: Walter Paea Fifita; 6 June 1997 (age 29) New Zealand
- Height: 195 cm (6 ft 5 in)
- Weight: 118 kg (260 lb; 18 st 8 lb)

Rugby union career
- Position: Wing
Senior career
Years	Team	Apps	(Points)
2018–19	El Salvador	16	(65)
2020–	North Harbour	3	(5)
2021–23	Glasgow Warriors	3	(0)
2022-23	Loan Stirling Wolves	7	(10)
- Correct as of 19 Feb 2022
International career
Years	Team	Apps	(Points)
2021–	Tonga	6	(5)
- Correct as of 20 Nov 2022

Walter Fifita (born 6 June 1997) is a Tonga international rugby union player. He played for Glasgow Warriors in the United Rugby Championship. He plays on the wing.

== Rugby Union career ==
=== Professional career ===
He played for El Salvador in Spain for the 2018-19 season.

From 2019 to 2021 he then played for North Harbour in the National Provincial Championship in New Zealand.

On 12 October 2021 Fifita signed for Glasgow Warriors. He stated:

I’m pretty stoked to be signed for Glasgow and start this new chapter in my career. I can’t wait to step out onto the field with these guys and I’m really happy. I’m really grateful for the opportunity and I want to thank both my agent and Glasgow for presenting me with it. Coming overseas was a big chance for me – I enjoyed my experience of it in the past when I was in Spain, and I’m looking forward to making more memories. I love to carry the ball and hopefully I can show the fans what I can do on the field.

He made his competitive debut for the Warriors on 8 January 2022, as a substitute in the match against the Ospreys in the United Rugby Championship. Fifita earned the Glasgow Warrior No. 340. He was released by the Warriors in April 2023. He made 3 appearances for the club.

=== International career ===
He made his debut for Tonga in 2021 against the All Blacks.
