= Rufus McLean =

Scotland international rugby union player

- Born: Rufus McLean; 2 March 2000 (age 26) Boston, United States
- Height: 1.81 m (5 ft 11 in)
- Weight: 84 kg (13 st 3 lb)
- School: Merchiston Castle School
- University: University of Strathclyde

Rugby union career
- Position: Wing / Fullback
Senior career
Years	Team	Apps	(Points)
2020–2023	Glasgow Warriors	26	(35)
2024	American Raptors	3	(0)
2025	Houston SaberCats	10	(15)
- Correct as of 8 September 2024
International career
Years	Team	Apps	(Points)
2019–2020	Scotland U20	6	(20)
2021–22	Scotland	3	(10)
2022	Scotland 'A'	1	(5)
2025–	United States		
- Correct as of 18 July 2022

Rufus McLean (born 2 March 2000) is a rugby union player who plays as a wing or fullback. He plays for the Houston SaberCats in Major League Rugby. Previously, he played for Glasgow Warriors in the United Rugby Championship and Scotland before being sacked January 2023, after pleading guilty to domestic abuse.

At Merchiston Castle School, he played every position from 9 to 15.

== Professional rugby career ==
McLean signed his first professional contract for Glasgow Warriors in June 2020. He made his debut for Glasgow Warriors in the re-arranged Round 9 of the 2020–21 Pro14 against Edinburgh. He won the Warriors 'Try of the Season' award for 2020/21 for a try against Dragons at the Principality Stadium.

His time at Glasgow Warriors was cut short when the club terminated his contract after he pleaded guilty in court to domestic abuse against his girlfriend, stating that his actions "constituted gross misconduct and breach of contract". It was revealed in court that McLean abused his partner for a period of over two years, for which he was issued a 10-year non-harassment order and sentenced to 120 hours of community service.

He was announced in the American Raptors squad for 2024.

== International rugby career ==
McLean has been capped at Scotland U18s and Scotland U20s scoring 4 tries in 6 appearances for the latter.

McLean received his first call up to the senior Scotland squad in March 2021 for the 2021 Six Nations Championship. He made his Scotland debut against Tonga on 30 October 2021. Scotland won the match 60 - 14, with McLean scoring 2 tries. He was capped by Scotland 'A' on 25 June 2022 in their match against Chile.

McLean was called up to the United States national rugby union team in 2025.

=== International tries ===
As of 30 October 2021

Try	Opposing team	Location	Venue	Competition	Date	Result	Score
[1-2]	Tonga	Edinburgh, Scotland	Murrayfield Stadium	Autumn Nations Series	30 October 2021	Win	60 – 14
