= Brad Thyer =

- Born: Brad Thyer; 7 February 1993 (age 33) Pontypridd, Wales
- Height: 181 cm (5 ft 11 in)
- Weight: 113 kg (17 st 11 lb)

Rugby union career
- Position: Loosehead Prop
Senior career
Years	Team	Apps	(Points)
2014-	Cardiff Rugby	92	(0)
2021	→ Glasgow Warriors	4	(0)
International career
Years	Team	Apps	(Points)
- Wales U20

Brad Thyer (born 7 February 1993) is a Welsh rugby union player who plays for Cardiff Rugby as a prop. He has also previously played for Glasgow Warriors on loan.

== Rugby Union career ==
=== Professional career ===
Thyer made his debut for Cardiff Rugby in 2015 having previously played for their academy team. He played 87 times for Cardiff before leaving to begin his loan at Glasgow Warriors.

On 9 September 2021 it was announced that Thyer would join Glasgow Warriors on a short term loan deal.

Thyer was named as a replacement for their 10 September 2021 friendly against Worcester Warriors. He made his competitive debut for Glasgow in the 24 September 2021 match against Ulster away at Ravenhill Stadium in the United Rugby Championship - earning the Glasgow Warrior No. 329.

On 18 October 2021 his loan deal to the Warriors ended and he returned to Cardiff Rugby.

=== International career ===
Thyer has played for the Wales Under 20 side.
