= Fotu Lokotui =

Tongan rugby union player

- Full name: Fotu Suluka Lokotui
- Born: 19 March 1992 (age 34) Longoteme, Tonga
- Height: 188 cm (6 ft 2 in)
- Weight: 108 kg (238 lb)

Rugby union career
- Position: Flanker
Senior career
Years	Team	Apps	(Points)
2019	Asia Pacific Dragons		
2019	Samoa Kagifa		
2019	Counties Manakau	18	(30)
2019-20	Doncaster Knights	12	(0)
2020-21	Glasgow Warriors		
2021-	Agen		
International career
Years	Team	Apps	(Points)
2017–present	Tonga	12	(0)

Fotu Suluka Lokotui (born 19 March 1992) is a Tongan rugby union player who generally plays as a Flanker. He represents Tonga internationally. He was included in the Tongan squad for the 2019 Rugby World Cup which is held in Japan for the first time and also marks his first World Cup appearance.

== Rugby Union career ==
=== Professional career ===
He played for Asia Pacific Dragons in Singapore; Samoa Kagifa in Samoa; and Counties Manukau in New Zealand before moving to the Northern Hemisphere.

On 29 November 2019, Lokotui joined Doncaster Knights in the English RFU Championship until the end of the 2019–20 season.

On 1 October 2020 he signed for Scottish club Glasgow Warriors in the Pro14 competition after a successful trial. He made his competitive debut as a substitute coming on against Connacht at the Galway Sportsgrounds on 3 October 2020. He became Glasgow Warrior No. 314.

On 31 May 2021, Lokotui would sign for French side Agen in the Pro D2 competition ahead of the 2021–22 season.

=== International career ===
He made his international debut for Tonga against Japan on 18 November 2017.
