= Lewis Bean =

English rugby union player

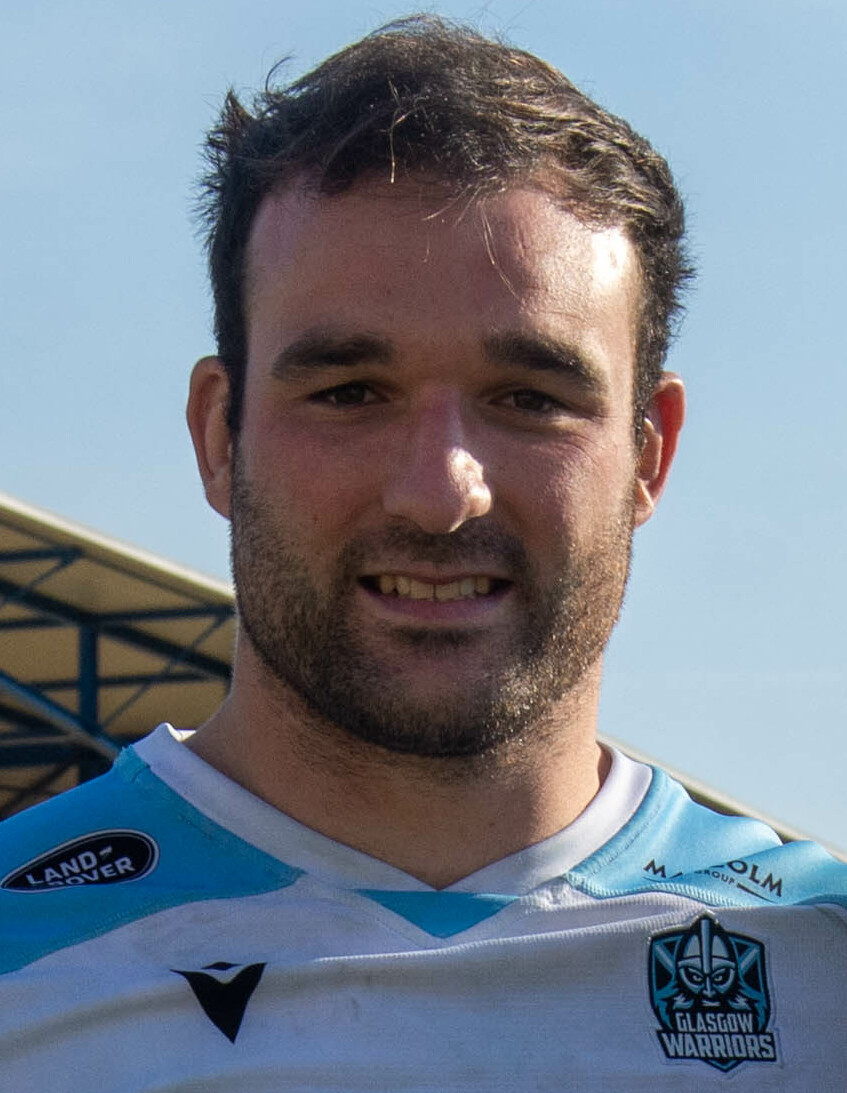
- Bean in 2021
- Born: Lewis Bean; February 12, 1992 (age 34) Beverley, England
- Height: 2.03 m (6 ft 8 in)
- Weight: 127 kg (20 st 0 lb; 280 lb)

Rugby union career
- Position: Lock
Amateur team(s)
Years	Team	Apps	(Points)
- Army Rugby Union
2017–19	Birmingham Moseley		
Senior career
Years	Team	Apps	(Points)
2019	Worcester Warriors	1	(0)
2019–21	Northampton Saints	15	(0)
2020–21	→ Glasgow Warriors	4	(0)
2021	→ Bedford Blues	7	(0)
2021–23	Glasgow Warriors	36	(20)
2023–	Montauban		

Lewis Bean (born 12 February 1992) is an English professional rugby union player who plays as a Lock for Montauban. He previously played for the Glasgow Warriors. He currently serves in the British Army.

== Rugby Union career ==
=== Amateur career ===
Bean played for the Army Rugby Union. He turned out for the Army against the Navy in the 100th anniversary match at Twickenham.

Bean played for Birmingham Moseley from 2017 to 2019.

=== Professional career ===
At the start of the 2019–20 season, he was training with Worcester Warriors. He played for the Warriors in the Premiership Rugby Cup and Premiership Shield.

However Bean was instead signed for the Northampton Saints for their 2019–20 season.

Bean was loaned to Glasgow Warriors in November 2020. He was named on the bench for the Warriors match away to Ulster. He became Glasgow Warrior No. 317. On 10 February 2021, it was announced that the deal would be made permanent for the coming season.

Bean returned to Northampton Saints for the rest of the season, but he was then loaned out to Bedford Blues. The Bedford side has a partnership deal with the Saints, and this saw 12 Saints players, including Bean, move to the Blues for the close of the 2020–21 RFU Championship season.

Back with Glasgow Warriors, Bean stayed with the club until the summer of 2023. He made 40 appearances in total for the club, scoring 4 tries.

He has now signed for the French side Montauban for the 2023–24 season.

== Army career ==
Bean is a Corporal in the British Army based with The Rifles and has completed two tours of Afghanistan.
