= Sean Kennedy (rugby union) =

Irish rugby union player

- Born: Sean Kennedy; 24 April 1991 (age 35) Limerick, Ireland
- Height: 1.78 m (5 ft 10 in)
- Weight: 80 kg (12 st 8 lb; 176 lb)
- School: Lornshill Academy
- Notable relative: Grant Gilchrist (Cousin) Rikki Gilchrist (Cousin) Donald Gilchrist (3rd Cousin twice removed)

Rugby union career
- Position: Scrum-Half
Amateur team(s)
Years	Team	Apps	(Points)
- St. Marys
- Alloa
-2011	Stirling County		
2025-	Stirling County		
Senior career
Years	Team	Apps	(Points)
2011–19	Edinburgh	66	(18)
2012–13	→ Glasgow Warriors	7	(0)
2014	→ London Irish	4	(0)
2019-25	Glasgow Warriors	25	(10)
Super Rugby
Years	Team	Apps	(Points)
2019-20	Stirling Wolves		
International career
Years	Team	Apps	(Points)
2011	Scotland U20	8	(10)
- Correct as of 6 February 2013
National sevens team
Years	Team		Comps
2011–	Scotland 7s		11
Coaching career
- Years: Team
- 2023-: Stirling County (defence coach)

14th Sir Willie Purves Quaich
- In office 2013–2013
- Preceded by: David Denton
- Succeeded by: Jonny Gray

Sean Kennedy (born 24 April 1991) is a Scotland 7s international rugby union player and coach. He is now a player / coach at Stirling County focussing on defence and transition. His regular playing position is scrum-half. He previously played for Glasgow Warriors, Stirling Wolves, Edinburgh Rugby and London Irish.

== Rugby union career ==
=== Amateur career ===
In August 2025 it was announced that Kennedy would be a player-coach at Stirling County.

=== Professional career ===
Kennedy played for Pro14 side Edinburgh from 2011 until he was released in 2019. For the 2012–13 season he was on loan to Glasgow Warriors. He is Glasgow Warrior No. 208 making his debut in that loan season against Zebre on 28 September 2012. He had 7 caps for Glasgow that season.

The following season 2013-14 he was again loaned out by the Edinburgh club, this time to London Irish.

When he was released by Edinburgh he was re-signed by Glasgow Warriors on 7 August 2019, initially on a partnership contract with Super 6 side Stirling Wolves. He played for the Glasgow club for 6 seasons providing critical squad depth during international windows. He had another 25 caps for the Warriors, scoring 2 tries.

=== International career ===
Kennedy has represented Scotland Under 20 in the 2011 IRB Junior World Championship and Scotland 7s on the 2012 HSBC World Series.

In 2013 Kennedy was named in the Scottish national team for the 2013 Six Nations Championship.

Kennedy received a call up to the senior Scotland squad by coach Gregor Townsend on 22 May 2017 for the summer tour.

=== Coaching career ===
He has been coaching Stirling County since 2023. In 2025 it was announced that he would coach Defence and Transition at the club.
