= 2014–15 Glasgow Warriors season =

- Ground: Scotstoun Stadium (Capacity: 10,000)
- Coach: (Scotland) Gregor Townsend
- Captain: (Scotland) Alastair Kellock
- Most caps: (Scotland) Peter Horne (Fiji) Niko Matawalu (South Africa) Josh Strauss (27)
- Top scorer: (Scotland) Finn Russell (123)
- Most tries: (Canada) D. T. H. van der Merwe (11)
- League: Pro 12
- 1st (champions)
Team kit	2nd kit

The 2014–15 season saw Glasgow Warriors compete in the Pro12 and the European Champions Cup.

== Team ==
=== Coaches ===
- Head coach: (Scotland) Gregor Townsend
- Assistant coach: (Scotland) Shade Munro
- Assistant coach: (Scotland) Matt Taylor
- Assistant coach: (Scotland) Kenny Murray

=== Squad ===
Hookers (Scotland) Fraser Brown (Scotland) Kevin Bryce (Scotland) Dougie Hall (Scotland) Pat MacArthur Props (Scotland) Alex Allan (England) Michael Cusack (Scotland) Ryan Grant (Scotland) George Hunter (South Africa) Rossouw de Klerk (Scotland) Gordon Reid (Scotland) Jon Welsh (Fiji) Jerry Yanuyanutawa Locks (Scotland) Jonny Gray (Scotland) Alastair Kellock (Fiji) Leone Nakarawa (Scotland) Tom Ryder (Scotland) Tim Swinson	Back rowers (Scotland) Adam Ashe (Scotland) Will Bordill (Scotland) James Eddie (Scotland) Chris Fusaro (Scotland) Rob Harley (Scotland) Tyrone Holmes (South Africa) Josh Strauss (Scotland) Ryan Wilson Scrum-halves (Fiji) Nikola Matawalu (Scotland) Murray McConnell (Scotland) Henry Pyrgos Fly-halves (Scotland) Finn Russell (Scotland) Duncan Weir (Scotland) Fraser Lyle	Centres (Scotland) Mark Bennett (Ireland) James Downey (Scotland) Alex Dunbar (Scotland) Peter Horne (Scotland) Richie Vernon; Back three (Scotland) Rory Hughes (Scotland) Lee Jones (Scotland) Sean Lamont (Scotland) Sean Maitland (Canada) D. T. H. van der Merwe (Scotland) Tommy Seymour (Scotland) Stuart Hogg (Scotland) Peter Murchie

==== Scottish Rugby Academy Stage 3 players ====
- (Scotland) James Malcolm – Hooker
- (Scotland) Fergus Scott – Hooker
- (Scotland) Zander Fagerson – Prop
- (Scotland) Cameron Fenton – Prop
- (Scotland) D'Arcy Rae – Prop
- (Scotland) Scott Cummings – Lock
- (Scotland) Andrew Davidson – Lock
- (Scotland) Andy Redmayne – Lock
- (Scotland) Matt Smith – Flanker
- (Scotland) Tommy Spinks – Flanker
- (Scotland) Ali Price – Scrum-half
- (Scotland) Gavin Lowe – Fly-half
- (Scotland) Neil Herron – Centre
- (Scotland) Jack Steele – Centre
- (Scotland) Glenn Bryce – Fullback

== Player statistics ==
During the 2014–15 season, Glasgow have used 52 different players in competitive games. The table below shows the number of appearances and points scored by each player.

Position	Nation	Name	Pro12			Champions Cup			Total	
Position	Nation	Name	Apps (sub)	Tries	Points kicked	Apps (sub)	Tries	Points kicked	Apps (sub)	Total pts
HK	(Scotland)	Fraser Brown	7(7)	0	0	1(4)	0	0	8(11)	0
HK	(Scotland)	Kevin Bryce	2(5)	1	0	0	0	0	2(5)	5
HK	(Scotland)	Dougie Hall	4(6)	1	0	(1)	0	0	4(7)	5
HK	(Scotland)	Pat MacArthur	11(6)	1	0	6	0	0	17(6)	5
PR	(Scotland)	Alex Allan	7(7)	0	0	(1)	0	0	7(8)	0
PR	(England)	Mike Cusack	3(3)	0	0	1(1)	0	0	4(4)	0
PR	(Scotland)	Zander Fagerson	2(6)	0	0	0	0	0	2(6)	0
PR	(Scotland)	Ryan Grant	8(2)	0	0	3	0	0	11(2)	0
PR	(South Africa)	Rossouw de Klerk	9(5)	1	0	(2)	0	0	12(7)	5
PR	(Scotland)	Euan Murray	7(3)	0	0	2(1)	0	0	9(4)	0
PR	(Scotland)	D'Arcy Rae	(1)	0	0	0	0	0	(1)	0
PR	(Scotland)	Gordon Reid	6(7)	0	0	3(2)	0	0	9(9)	0
PR	(Scotland)	Jon Welsh	4(5)	0	0	3(1)	0	0	7(6)	0
PR	(Fiji)	Jerry Yanuyanutawa	3(7)	0	0	(2)	0	0	3(9)	0
LK	(Scotland)	Jonny Gray	10(2)	2	0	6	0	0	16(2)	10
LK	(Scotland)	Alastair Kellock	14(1)	0	0	1	0	0	15(1)	0
LK	(Fiji)	Leone Nakarawa	11(8)	1	0	4(2)	0	0	15(10)	5
LK	(Scotland)	Fraser McKenzie	(1)	0	0	0	0	0	(1)	0
LK	(Scotland)	Tom Ryder	3(1)	0	0	0	0	0	3(1)	0
LK	(Scotland)	Tim Swinson	10(3)	2	0	3(2)	0	0	13(5)	10
LK	(Scotland)	Alex Toolis	(1)	0	0	0	0	0	(1)	0
BR	(Scotland)	Adam Ashe	8(3)	2	0	1(1)	0	0	9(4)	10
BR	(Scotland)	Will Bordill	1(6)	1	0	0	0	0	1(6)	5
BR	(Scotland)	James Eddie	4(6)	1	0	(2)	0	0	4(8)	5
BR	(Scotland)	Chris Fusaro	13(3)	1	0	3	0	0	15(3)	5
BR	(Scotland)	Rob Harley	13	1	0	4	0	0	17	5
BR	(Scotland)	Tyrone Holmes	6(2)	1	0	(1)	0	0	6(3)	5
BR	(Scotland)	Tommy Spinks	(2)	0	0	0	0	0	(2)	0
BR	(South Africa)	Josh Strauss	19(4)	3	0	4	0	0	23(4)	15
BR	(Scotland)	Ryan Wilson	7(4)	0	0	2(1)	0	0	9(5)	0
SH	(Fiji)	Nikola Matawalu	16(5)	6	0	1(5)	2	0	17(10)	40
SH	(Scotland)	Murray McConnell	1(2)	0	0	0	0	0	1(2)	0
SH	(Scotland)	Ali Price	2(4)	0	0	0	0	0	2(4)	0
SH	(Scotland)	Henry Pyrgos	10(5)	1	12	5(1)	0	0	15(6)	17
FH	(Canada)	Connor Braid	2(5)	0	11	0	0	0	2(5)	11
FH	(Scotland)	Finn Russell	9(2)	3	70	5(1)	0	35	14(3)	120
FH	(Scotland)	Duncan Weir	6(6)	0	73	1(3)	0	18	7(9)	91
FH	(Scotland)	Fraser Lyle	3(1)	1	0	0	0	0	3(1)	5
CE	(Scotland)	Mark Bennett	5	2	3	3(1)	2	0	8(1)	23
CE	(Ireland)	James Downey	3(4)	0	0	0	0	0	3(4)	0
CE	(Scotland)	Alex Dunbar	6	2	0	5	1	0	11	15
CE	(Scotland)	Peter Horne	22	6	69	3(2)	0	0	25(2)	99
CE	(Scotland)	Richie Vernon	13(3)	2	0	2(2)	1	0	15(5)	15
WG	(Scotland)	Rory Hughes	1(2)	0	0	0	0	0	1(2)	0
WG	(Scotland)	Lee Jones	6(5)	0	0	0	0	0	6(5)	0
WG	(Scotland)	Sean Lamont	10(3)	2	0	(2)	0	0	10(5)	10
WG	(Scotland)	Sean Maitland	2(1)	0	0	5(1)	1	0	6(2)	5
WG	(Canada)	D. T. H. van der Merwe	14(4)	8	0	2(2)	3	0	16(6)	55
WG	(Scotland)	Tommy Seymour	14(1)	4	0	6	1	0	20(1)	25
FB	(Scotland)	Glenn Bryce	(4)	1	0	0	0	0	(4)	15
FB	(Scotland)	Stuart Hogg	10(2)	5	9	4	0	0	14(2)	34
FB	(Scotland)	Peter Murchie	13(2)	3	0	1	0	0	14(2)	15

== Staff movements ==
None

== Player movements ==
=== Academy promotions ===
- (Scotland) Adam Ashe
- (Scotland) Rory Hughes

=== Player transfers ===
==== In ====
- (Scotland) Alex Allan from (Scotland) Edinburgh
- (Scotland) Murray McConnell from (Scotland) Ayr RFC
- (Scotland) Euan Murray from (England) Worcester Warriors
- (Ireland) James Downey from (Ireland) Munster
- (South Africa) Rossouw de Klerk from (South Africa) Cheetahs
- (Canada) Connor Braid from (Canada) BC Bears
- (Scotland) Fraser Lyle from (Scotland) Stirling County

==== Out ====
- (Scotland) Moray Low to (England) Exeter Chiefs
- (Scotland) Chris Cusiter to (England) Sale Sharks
- (Scotland) Ruaridh Jackson to (England) Wasps
- (Scotland) Ed Kalman retired
- (Scotland) Byron McGuigan released
- (Scotland) Finlay Gillies released
- Scott Wight to Scotland 7s
- (United States) Carlin Isles to (United States) USA Sevens
- (United States) Folau Niua to (United States) USA Sevens
- (Canada) Connor Braid to (England) London Scottish (loan)
- (Ireland) James Downey to Wasps (loan)
- (Scotland) Tom Ryder to Northampton Saints

== Competitions ==
=== Pre-season and friendlies ===
==== Match 1 ====
23 August 2014
15:30

Glasgow Warriors (Scotland)	23–24	(England) Harlequins
Try: Nikola Matawalu (2); D. T. H. van der Merwe; Con: Duncan Weir; Pen: Duncan Weir (2)	Preview; Report; Report; Report	Try: Joe Marler; Kyle Sinckler; Ollie Lindsay-Hague; Marland Yarde; Con: Nick Evans (2)

Scotstoun Stadium
Attendance: 3,849
Referee: Neil Paterson (Scotland)

Glasgow Warriors: 1 Alex Allan, 2 Fraser Brown, 3 Euan Murray, 4 Jonny Gray, 5 Leone Nakarawa, 6 James Eddie, 7 Tyrone Holmes, 8 Josh Strauss, 9 Murray McConnell, 10 Duncan Weir, 11 Rory Hughes, 12 James Downey, 13 Mark Bennett, 14 Lee Jones, 15 Peter Murchie
Replacements: Jerry Yanuyanutawa, Chris Fusaro, Rossouw de Klerk, Pat MacArthur, Rob Harley, Nikola Matawalu, Peter Horne, D. T. H. van der Merwe, Adam Ashe, Connor Braid, Fergus Scott
Harlequins: 15 Mike Brown, 14 Marland Yarde, 13 Matt Hopper, 12 Jordan Turner Hall, 11 Ugo Monye, 10 Nick Evans, 9 Danny Care, 1 Joe Marler, 2 Joe Gray, 3 Kyle Sinckler, 4 Charlie Matthews, 5 George Robson, 6 Luke Wallace, 7 Chris Robshaw, 8 Nick Easter
Replacements: Rob Buchanan, Mark Lambert, Paul Doran Jones, George Merrick, Sam Twomey, Joe Trayfoot, Jack Clifford, Karl Dickson, Ben Botica, Ross Chisholm, Oliie Lindsay Hague, Charlie Walker

==== Match 2 ====
30 August 2014
15:00

London Scottish (England)	19–38	(Scotland) Glasgow Warriors
Try: Lee Millar; Dan Newton; Mike Doneghan; Con: Lee Millar (2)	Preview; Report; Report; Report	Try: Peter Murchie (2); Mark Bennett (2); Lee Jones; Jerry Yanuyanutawa; Con: Duncan Weir (2); Henry Pyrgos (2)

Athletic Ground, Richmond
Attendance: 1813
Referee: I Tempest (RFU)

London Scottish: 15. Peter Lydon (replaced by Errie Claassens), 14. Miles Mantella (replaced by Mike Doneghan), 13. Lee Millar, 12. PJ Gidlow (replaced by Alec Coombes), 11. Matt Williams, 10. Dan Newton, 9. Jamie Stevenson (replaced by Sam Stuart), 1. James Hallam (replaced by Mark Lilley, replaced by Darryl Marfo), 2. Adam Kwasnicki (c) (replaced by David Cherry) 3. Max Maidment (replaced by Ben Prescott), 4. Tai Tuisamoa, 5. Adam Preocanin,(replaced by Sam Twomey) 6. Freddie Clarke(replaced by Chevvy Pennycook), 7. Neil Best, 8. James Phillips
Replacements: 16. Darryl Marfo, 17. Mark Lilley, 18. David Cherry, 19. Ben Prescott, 20. Stewart Maguire, 21. Sam Twomey, 22. Chevvy Pennycook, 23. Ross Doneghan, 24. Ben Calder, 25. Sam Stuart, 26. Mike Doneghan, 27. Errie Claassens, 28. Alec Coombes (trialist).
Glasgow Warriors: 15. Peter Murchie, 14. Tommy Seymour, 13. Mark Bennett, 12. Alex Dunbar, 11. Lee Jones, 10. Duncan Weir, 9. Henry Pyrgos (c), 1. Gordon Reid (replaced by Alex Allan), 2. Kevin Bryce, 3. Rossouw de Klerk, 4. Tim Swinson, 5. Leone Nakarawa, 6. Tyrone Holmes, 7. Chris Fusaro, 8. Adam Ashe
Replacements: 16. Fraser Brown, 17. Alex Allan, 18. Jerry Yanuyanutawa, 19. James Eddie 20. Josh Strauss 21. Niko Matawalu, 22. Rory Hughes 23. James Downey, B. George Hunter, B. Will Bordill, B. Connor Braid

=== Pro12 ===
==== League table ====
Pro12 Table
	Team	Played	Won	Drawn	Lost	Points For	Points Against	Points Difference	Tries For	Tries Against	Try Bonus	Losing Bonus	Points
1	(Scotland) Glasgow Warriors (CH)	22	16	1	5	540	360	+180	63	33	9	0	75
2	(Ireland) Munster (RU)	22	15	2	5	581	367	+214	68	31	8	3	75
3	(Wales) Ospreys (SF)	22	16	1	5	546	358	+188	53	30	6	2	74
4	(Ireland) Ulster (SF)	22	14	2	6	524	372	+152	59	34	6	3	69
5	(Ireland) Leinster	22	11	3	8	483	375	+108	54	39	8	4	62
6	(Wales) Scarlets	22	11	3	8	452	388	+64	43	39	4	3	57
7	(Ireland) Connacht	22	10	1	11	447	419	+28	49	48	3	5	50
8	(Scotland) Edinburgh	22	10	1	11	399	419	−20	41	48	3	3	48
9	(Wales) Newport Gwent Dragons	22	8	0	14	393	484	−91	38	55	4	6	42
10	(Wales) Cardiff Blues	22	7	1	14	430	545	−115	46	57	3	2	35
11	(Italy) Benetton Treviso	22	3	1	18	306	641	−335	34	81	2	3	19
12	(Italy) Zebre	22	3	0	19	266	639	−373	27	80	0	3	15
If teams are level at any stage, tiebreakers are applied in the following order: 1. number of matches won; 2. the difference between points for and points against; 3. the number of tries scored; 4. the most points scored; 5. the difference between tries for and tries against; 6. the fewest red cards received; 7. the fewest yellow cards received.
Green background (rows 1 to 4) are play-off places, and earn a place in the 2015–16 European Rugby Champions Cup. Blue background indicates teams outside the play-off places, that earn a place in the European Rugby Champions Cup. The top team from each country will qualify. Yellow background indicates the team that advances to a play-off semi-final against Aviva Premiership side Gloucester, who qualified for the play-off as the 2014–15 European Rugby Challenge Cup winners. Plain background indicates teams that earn a place in the 2015–16 European Rugby Challenge Cup.

==== Results ====
===== Round 1 =====
6 September 2014
17:15

Glasgow Warriors (Scotland)	22–20	(Ireland) Leinster (1 BP)
Try: Horne 16' c Gray 23' m Strauss 30' c Con: Pyrgos (2/3); Pen: Hogg (1/1) 80'	Report	Try: J. McGrath 71' c Denton 73' c Con: Gopperth (2/2); Pen: Madigan (1/1) 33'; Gopperth (1/2) 51'

Scotstoun Stadium
Attendance: 5,725
Referee: Nigel Owens (WRU)

===== Round 2 =====
14 September 2014
16:00

Cardiff Blues (Wales)	12–33	(Scotland) Glasgow Warriors
Pen: Patchell (4/6) 3', 18', 47', 56'	Report	Try: Lamont 32' c Matawalu (2) 57' c, 67' c Con: Pyrgos (1/1); Weir (2/2); Pen: Pyrgos (2/2) 7', 12'; Weir (2/2) 62', 66'

BT Sport Cardiff Arms Park
Attendance: 6,897
Referee: John Lacey (IRFU)

===== Round 3 =====
20 September 2014
14:40

Newport Gwent Dragons (Wales)	13–33	(Scotland) Glasgow Warriors (1 BP)
Try: Rees 57' c Con: O'Brien (1/1); Pen: O'Brien (2/3) 23', 46'	Report	Try: Dunbar 4' c Strauss 54' c Seymour 68' m Swinson 77' m Con: Weir (2/4); Pen: Weir (2/2) 18', 48'; Hogg (1/1) 28'

Rodney Parade
Attendance: 5,885
Referee: David Wilkinson (IRFU)

===== Round 4 =====
26 September 2014
19:35

(1 BP) Glasgow Warriors (Scotland)	39–21	(Ireland) Connacht
Try: Hogg (2) 19' c, 46' m Pyrgos 36' c Van der Merwe 61' c Bennett 74' c Con: Weir (4/5); Pen: Weir (2/2) 30', 71'	Report	Try: McSharry 23' c Leader 56' c penalty try 68' c Con: Porter (3/3)

Scotstoun Stadium
Attendance: 5,821
Referee: Claudio Blessano (FIR)

===== Round 5 =====
5 October 2014
15:00

Benetton Treviso (Italy)	23–40	(Scotland) Glasgow Warriors (1 BP)
Try: Campagnaro (2) 8' c, 62' c Con: Carlisle (1/1); Hayward (1/1); Pen: Carlisle (3/4) 1', 32', 38'	Report	Try: Seymour (2) 13' m, 27' c Holmes 23' c Eddie 48' c Van der Merwe 54' c Lamont 56' c Con: Weir (3/4); Russell (2/2)

Stadio Comunale di Monigo
Attendance: 2,382
Referee: Gary Conway (IRFU)

===== Round 6 =====
11 October 2014
17:05

Ulster (Ireland)	29–9	(Scotland) Glasgow Warriors
Try: Gilroy 66' c Bowe 69' c Con: Humphreys (2/2); Pen: Humphreys (5/6) 10', 16', 21', 31', 36'	Report	Pen: Russell (3/3) 7', 18', 43'

Kingspan Stadium
Attendance: 16,260
Referee: Nigel Owens (WRU)

===== Round 7 =====
31 October 2014
19:35

Glasgow Warriors (Scotland)	17–9	(Italy) Benetton Treviso
Try: Matawalu 19' m Pen: Horne (4/6) 24', 36', 67', 79'	Report	Pen: Hayward (3/4) 29', 38', 54'

Scotstoun Stadium
Attendance: 5,901
Referee: Ian Davies (WRU)

===== Round 8 =====
21 November 2014
19:35

Scarlets (Wales)	19–9	(Scotland) Glasgow Warriors
Try: Pitman 76' c Con: S. Shingler (1/1); Pen: S. Shingler (4/4) 5', 13', 25', 63'	Report	Pen: Horne (3/3) 7', 44', 60'

Parc y Scarlets
Attendance: 6,038
Referee: David Wilkinson (IRFU)

===== Round 9 =====
30 November 2014
16:00

Glasgow Warriors (Scotland)	19–15	(Wales) Newport Gwent Dragons (1 BP)
Try: penalty try 44' c Con: Weir (1/1); Pen: Weir (4/4) 7', 24', 60', 66'	Report	Pen: G. Jones (5/5) 5', 16', 28', 46', 71'

Scotstoun Stadium
Attendance: 5,289
Referee: Dudley Phillips (IRFU)

===== Round 10 =====
20 December 2014
14:40

Glasgow Warriors (Scotland)	21–18	(Ireland) Munster (1 BP)
Try: Nakarawa 51' c Gray 72' m Con: Russell (1/2); Pen: Russell (3/5) 6', 18', 29'	Report	Try: Hanrahan 7' m Copeland 40' c Con: Hanrahan (1/2); Pen: Hanrahan (2/4) 26', 36'

Scotstoun Stadium
Attendance: 6,176
Referee: Leighton Hodges (WRU)

===== Round 11: 1872 Cup (1st Leg) =====
27 December 2014
14:40

Glasgow Warriors (Scotland)	16–6	(Scotland) Edinburgh
Try: Strauss 36' c Con: Weir (1/1); Pen: Weir (3/4) 15', 34', 69'	Report	Pen: Hidalgo-Clyne (1/1) 5'; Heathcote (1/1) 52'

Scotstoun Stadium
Attendance: 6,945
Referee: George Clancy (IRFU)

===== Round 12: 1872 Cup (2nd Leg) =====
2 January 2015
19:35

Edinburgh (Scotland)	20–8	(Scotland) Glasgow Warriors
Try: Visser (2) 28' c, 32' c Con: Hidalgo-Clyne (2/2); Pen: Hidalgo-Clyne (2/4) 17', 25'	Report	Try: Matawalu 41' m Pen: Russell (1/1) 10'

Murrayfield Stadium
Attendance: 15,810
Referee: Nigel Owens (WRU)

Edinburgh Rugby won the 1872 Cup with an aggregate score of 26–24.

===== Round 13 =====
9 January 2015
19:35

Glasgow Warriors (Scotland)	22–7	(Wales) Scarlets
Try: Dunbar 26' m Murchie 43' c Van der Merwe 68' c Con: Russell (2/3); Pen: Russell (1/2) 65'	Report	Try: L. Williams 38' c Con: Priestland (1/1)

Scotstoun Stadium
Attendance: 5,320
Referee: George Clancy (IRFU)

===== Round 14 =====
15 February 2015
14:00

Zebre (Italy)	10–54	(Scotland) Glasgow Warriors (1 BP)
Try: Cristiano 16' c Con: Orquera (1/1); Pen: Orquera (1/1) 7'	Report	Try: Horne (2) 2' c, 36' m Van der Merwe 14' c Murchie (2) 18' c, 75' c Swinson 40' c Lyle 64' c Bordill 78' c Con: Horne (5/6); Braid (2/2)

Stadio Sergio Lanfranchi
Attendance: 900
Referee: Leo Colgan (IRFU)

===== Round 15 =====
21 February 2015
17:15

Glasgow Warriors (Scotland)	19–16	(Wales) Ospreys (1 BP)
Try: MacArthur 13' c Con: Horne (1/1); Pen: Horne (4/5) 36', 50', 67', 74'	Report	Try: Grabham 52' c Con: Davies (1/1); Pen: Davies (3/6) 26', 33', 57'

Scotstoun Stadium
Attendance: 6,167
Referee: George Clancy (IRFU)

===== Round 16 =====
28 February 2015
19:15

(1 BP) Munster (Ireland)	22–10	(Scotland) Glasgow Warriors
Try: O'Donoghue 28' m Guiñazú 37' c Earls 61' m Stander 66' m Con: Keatley (1/4)	Report	Try: de Klerk 59' c Con: Braid (1/1); Pen: Braid (1/2) 52'

Irish Independent Park
Attendance: 7,361
Referee: Nigel Owens (WRU)

===== Round 17 =====
6 March 2015
19:35

(1 BP) Glasgow Warriors (Scotland)	26–5	(Italy) Zebre
Try: Van der Merwe (2) 3' c, 36' m Fusaro 20' c K. Bryce 27' c Con: Horne (2/2); Braid (1/2)	Report	Try: Berryman 58' m

Scotstoun Stadium
Attendance: 5,528
Referee: Ian Davies (WRU)

===== Round 18 =====
27 March 2015
19:35

(1 BP) Leinster (Ireland)	34–34	(Scotland) Glasgow Warriors (1 BP)
Try: McFadden 24' c Boss (2) 41' c, 54' c Murphy 51' c Con: Madigan (4/4); Pen: Madigan (2/2) 46', 70'	Report	Try: Hogg 7' c Vernon 30' c Bennett 34' c G. Bryce 73' c Con: Horne (4/4); Pen: Horne (1/1) 11'; Bennett (1/1) 40'

RDS Arena
Attendance: 16,210
Referee: Nigel Owens (WRU)

===== Round 19 =====
10 April 2015
19:35

(1 BP) Glasgow Warriors (Scotland)	36–17	(Wales) Cardiff Blues
Try: Hall 24' c Horne (3) 27' m, 31' c, 40' c Ashe 44' c Con: Horne (3/4); Russell (1/1); Pen: Horne (1/2) 4'	Report	Try: G. Davies 60' c Fish 67' c Con: Anscombe (2/2); Pen: Anscombe (1/1) 14'

Scotstoun Stadium
Attendance: 7,240
Referee: George Clancy (IRFU)

===== Round 20 =====
25 April 2015
13:05

Connacht (Ireland)	13–31	(Scotland) Glasgow Warriors (1 BP)
Try: Muldowney 53' c Con: Carty (1/1); Pen: Carty (2/5) 6', 16'	Report	Try: Matawalu (2) 24' m, 38' c Hogg 35' c Ashe 67' c Seymour 73' m Con: Russell (3/5)

Galway Sportsgrounds
Attendance: 4,430
Referee: Marius Mitrea (FIR)

===== Round 21 =====
8 May 2015
19:35

Ospreys (Wales)	21–10	(Scotland) Glasgow Warriors
Try: John 46' m Webb 58' c Con: Biggar (1/2); Pen: D. Evans (1/1) 19'; Biggar (2/2) 42', 74'	Report	Try: Fusaro 62' c Con: Weir (1/1); Pen: Weir (1/3) 14'

Liberty Stadium
Attendance: 10,981
Referee: George Clancy (IRFU)

===== Round 22 =====
16 May 2015
15:00

(1 BP) Glasgow Warriors (Scotland)	32–10	(Ireland) Ulster
Try: Hogg 54' m Russell (2) 59' c, 69' c Vernon 72' c Con: Russell (3/4); Pen: Russell (2/2) 5', 34'	Report	Try: Henry 28' c Con: Humphreys (1/1) 29'; Pen: Humphreys (1/1) 36'

Scotstoun Stadium
Attendance: 10,000
Referee: Ian Davies (WRU)

==== Play-offs ====
===== Semi-finals =====
22 May 2015
19:45

Glasgow Warriors (Scotland)	16–14	(Ireland) Ulster
Try: Van der Merwe 75' c Con: Russell (1/1); Pen: Russell (2/2) 5', 60'; Hogg (1/2) 13'	Report	Try: Henry 18' m Pen: Pienaar (3/3) 1', 55', 66'

Scotstoun Stadium
Attendance: 10,000
Referee: George Clancy (IRFU)

===== Final =====
30 May 2015
18:30

Munster (Ireland)	13–31	(Scotland) Glasgow Warriors
Try: Smith 37' c Con: Keatley (1/1); Pen: Keatley (2/3) 23', 48'	Report	Try: Harley 8' c Van der Merwe 25' c Pyrgos 31' c Russell 58' c Con: Russell (4/4); Pen: Weir (1/1) 73'

Kingspan Stadium
Attendance: 17,057
Referee: Nigel Owens (WRU)

=== Europe ===
==== Results ====
===== Round 1 =====
18 October 2014
15:15

Glasgow Warriors (Scotland) (1 BP)	37–10	(England) Bath
Try: Bennett 10' c Maitland 28' m Seymour 36' m Matawalu 65' c Bennett 70' c Con: Weir (4/5); Pen: Weir (2/2)	Report	Try: Joseph 12' c Con: Ford (1/1); Pen: Ford (1/1)

Scotstoun Stadium
Attendance: 6,746
Referee: Jérôme Garcès

===== Round 2 =====
25 October 2014
18:15

Montpellier (France) (1 BP)	13–15	(Scotland) Glasgow Warriors
Try: Penalty try Con: Iribaren; Pen: Paillaugue x2	Report	Pen: Russell x5

Altrad Stadium
Referee: JP Doyle

===== Round 3 =====
7 December 2014
16:15

Toulouse (France)	19–11	(Scotland) Glasgow Warriors
Try: Médard 41' c Con: Bézy (1/1) 41'; Pen: Bézy (4/4) 18', 36', 40', 62'	Report	Try: Matawalu 77' m Pen: Russell (2/2) 24', 54'

Stade Ernest-Wallon
Attendance: 16,670
Referee: John Lacey (IRFU)

===== Round 4 =====
13 December 2014
13:00

(1 BP) Glasgow Warriors (Scotland)	9–12	(France) Toulouse
Pen: Russell (1/3) 12'; Weir (2/2) 65', 73'	Report	Pen: Bézy (4/4) 8', 20', 48', 58'

Scotstoun Stadium
Attendance: 6,894
Referee: Wayne Barnes (RFU)

===== Round 5 =====
18 January 2015
13:00

Glasgow Warriors (Scotland)	21–10	(France) Montpellier
Try: Van der Merwe 12', 57', 68'; Con: Russell (3/3)13', 58', 69'	Report	Try: Privat 18'; Con: Lucas 19'; Pen: Lucas 6'

Scotstoun Stadium
Attendance: 6,056
Referee: Luke Pearce (RFU)

===== Round 6 =====
25 January 2015
13:00

Bath (England)	20–15	(Scotland) (1 BP) Glasgow Warriors
Try: Penalty try 52', 66'; Con: Ford 53', Devoto 66'; Pen: Ford 29', 34'	Report	Try: Dunbar 4', Vernon 48'; Con: Russell (1/2) 5'; Pen: Russell 55'

Recreation Ground
Attendance: 13,349
Referee: John Lacey (IRFU)

==== Table ====
Team	P	W	D	L	PF	PA	Diff	TF	TA	TB	LB	Pts
(England) Bath (5)	6	4	0	2	146	108	+38	15	15	2	1	19
(France) Toulouse	6	4	0	2	126	124	+2	11	10	0	1	17
(Scotland) Glasgow Warriors	6	3	0	3	108	84	+24	11	6	1	2	15
(France) Montpellier	6	1	0	5	90	154	−64	9	15	0	2	6

== End of Season awards ==
Award	Winner
Young Player of the Season	(Scotland) Adam Ashe
Coaches Award	(Scotland) Mark Bennett & (Scotland) Peter Murchie
Test Player of the Season	(Scotland) Stuart Hogg
Most Improved Player of the Season	(Scotland) Fraser Brown
Al Kellock Leadership Award	(Scotland) Alastair Kellock
Community Club of the Season	Hamilton Bulls
Try of the Season	(Scotland) Stuart Hogg vs. (Ireland) Ulster
Players' Player of the Season	(Scotland) Peter Horne
Player of the Season	(Fiji) Nikola Matawalu

== Competitive debuts this season ==
A player's nationality shown is taken from the nationality at the highest honour for the national side obtained; or if never capped internationally their place of birth. Senior caps take precedence over junior caps or place of birth; junior caps take precedence over place of birth. A player's nationality at debut may be different from the nationality shown. Combination sides like the British and Irish Lions or Pacific Islanders are not national sides, or nationalities.

Players in BOLD font have been capped by their senior international XV side as nationality shown.

Players in Italic font have capped either by their international 7s side; or by the international XV 'A' side as nationality shown.

Players in normal font have not been capped at senior level.

A position in parentheses indicates that the player debuted as a substitute. A player may have made a prior debut for Glasgow Warriors in a non-competitive match, 'A' match or 7s match; these matches are not listed.

Tournaments where competitive debut made:

**Scottish Inter-District Championship**	**Welsh–Scottish League**	**WRU Challenge Cup**	**Celtic League**	**Celtic Cup**	**1872 Cup**	**Pro12**	**Pro14**	**Rainbow Cup**	**United Rugby Championship**	**European Challenge Cup**	**Heineken Cup / European Champions Cup**

Crosshatching indicates a jointly hosted match.

Number	Player nationality	Name	Position	Date of debut	Venue	Stadium	Opposition nationality	Opposition side	Tournament	Match result	Scoring debut
231	(Scotland)	**Alex Allan**	Prop	2014-09-06	Home	Scotstoun Stadium	(Ireland)	Leinster	Pro12	Win	Nil
232	(South Africa)	Rossouw de Klerk	(Prop)	2014-09-06	Home	Scotstoun Stadium	(Ireland)	Leinster	Pro12	Win	Nil
233	(Ireland)	**James Downey**	(Centre)	2014-09-26	Home	Scotstoun Stadium	(Ireland)	Connacht	Pro12	Win	Nil
234	(Scotland)	**Zander Fagerson**	(Prop)	2014-10-05	Away	Stadio Comunale di Monigo	(Italy)	Benetton Treviso	Pro12	Win	Nil
235	(Scotland)	Will Bordill	(Flanker)	2014-10-31	Home	Scotstoun Stadium	(Italy)	Benetton Treviso	Pro12	Win	Nil
236	(Canada)	**Connor Braid**	(Fly half)	2014-10-31	Home	Scotstoun Stadium	(Italy)	Benetton Treviso	Pro12	Win	Nil
237	(Scotland)	**Ali Price**	(Scrum half)	2014-11-21	Home	Parc y Scarlets	(Wales)	Scarlets	Pro12	Loss	Nil
238	(Scotland)	Glenn Bryce	(Centre)	2014-11-21	Home	Parc y Scarlets	(Wales)	Scarlets	Pro12	Loss	Nil
239	(Scotland)	Fraser Lyle	Centre	2015-02-15	Away	Stadio Sergio Lanfranchi	(Italy)	Zebre	Pro12	Win	Nil
240	(Scotland)	Fraser McKenzie	(Lock)	2015-02-21	Home	Scotstoun Stadium	(Wales)	Ospreys	Pro12	Win	Nil
241	(Scotland)	**D'Arcy Rae**	(Prop)	2015-02-28	Away	Musgrave Park	(Ireland)	Munster	Pro12	Loss	Nil
242	(Australia)	Alex Toolis	(Lock)	2015-02-28	Away	Musgrave Park	(Ireland)	Munster	Pro12	Loss	Nil
243	(Scotland)	Tommy Spinks	(Flanker)	2015-02-28	Away	Musgrave Park	(Ireland)	Munster	Pro12	Loss	Nil

== Sponsorship ==
- BT Sport
- Rowan Glen
- McCrea Financial Services
- Malcolm Group
- QBE Insurance

=== Official kit supplier ===
Macron
