= 2011–12 Glasgow Warriors season =

Glasgow Warriors 2011 / 2012
- Ground: Firhill Stadium (Capacity: 10,887)
- Coach: (Scotland) Sean Lineen
- Captain: (Scotland) Alastair Kellock
- Most caps: (Scotland) Tom Ryder (27)
- Top scorer: (Scotland) Duncan Weir (256)
- Most tries: (Scotland) Stuart Hogg (6)
- League: Pro12
- 4th
Team kit	2nd kit

The 2011–12 season saw Glasgow Warriors compete in the competitions: the RaboDirect Pro12 and the European Champions Cup, the Heineken Cup.

== Team ==
=== Squad ===
Hookers (Scotland) Finlay Gillies (Scotland) Dougie Hall (Scotland) Pat MacArthur (Scotland) Fergus Thomson Props (England) Michael Cusack (Scotland) Ryan Grant (Scotland) Ed Kalman (Scotland) Moray Low (Scotland) Gordon Reid (Scotland) Jon Welsh Locks (Scotland) Nick Campbell (Scotland) Richie Gray (Scotland) Alastair Kellock (New Zealand) Rob Verbakel (Scotland) Tom Ryder	Loose forwards (Scotland) John Barclay (Scotland) Johnnie Beattie (Scotland) Ross Doneghan (Scotland) Rob Harley (Scotland) James Eddie (Scotland) Calum Forrester (Scotland) Chris Fusaro (Wales) Rory Pitman (Scotland) Ryan Wilson Scrum-halves (Scotland) Chris Cusiter (Scotland) Colin Gregor (Scotland) Henry Pyrgos Fly-halves (Scotland) Ruaridh Jackson (Scotland) Duncan Weir (Scotland) Scott Wight	Centres (Scotland) Alex Dunbar (Scotland) Peter Horne (Scotland) Graeme Morrison (Scotland) Peter Murchie (New Zealand) Troy Nathan Back three (Argentina) Federico Martín Aramburú (Scotland) Rob Dewey (Scotland) Stuart Hogg (Scotland) Rory Lamont (Samoa) David Lemi (Scotland) Dave McCall (Scotland) Colin Shaw (Scotland) Tommy Seymour (Canada) D. T. H. van der Merwe

==== Academy players ====
- (Scotland) George Hunter - Prop
- (Scotland) Rob McAlpine - Lock
- (Scotland) Adam Ashe - Flanker
- (Scotland) Callum Templeton - Number Eight
- (Scotland) Murray McConnell - Scrum-half
- (Scotland) Sean Kennedy - Scrum-half
- (Scotland) James Johnstone - Centre
- (Scotland) Mike Doneghan - Wing
- (Scotland) Rory Hughes - Wing

== Player statistics ==
During the 2011–12 season, Glasgow have used 43 different players in competitive games. The table below shows the number of appearances and points scored by each player.

Position	Nation	Name	Pro12			Champions Cup			Total	
Position	Nation	Name	Apps (sub)	Tries	Points kicked	Apps (sub)	Tries	Points kicked	Apps (sub)	Total pts
HK	(Scotland)	Finlay Gillies	3(7)	0	0	(1)	0	0	3(8)	0
HK	(Scotland)	Dougie Hall	8(6)	1	0	(5)	0	0	8(11)	5
HK	(Scotland)	Pat MacArthur	11(7)	0	0	6	0	0	17(7)	0
HK	(Scotland)	Fergus Thomson	1(1)	0	0	0	0	0	1(1)	0
PR	(England)	Michael Cusack	12(5)	0	0	4	0	0	16(5)	0
PR	(Scotland)	Ryan Grant	14(5)	0	0	3(2)	0	0	17(7)	0
PR	(Scotland)	Ed Kalman	4(8)	0	0	2(3)	0	0	6(11)	0
PR	(Scotland)	Moray Low	3(8)	2	0	(1)	0	0	3(9)	10
PR	(Scotland)	Gordon Reid	2(10)	0	0	(2)	0	0	2(12)	0
PR	(Scotland)	Jon Welsh	11(3)	3	0	3(2)	0	0	14(5)	15
LK	(Scotland)	Nick Campbell	5(1)	1	0	0	0	0	5(1)	5
LK	(Scotland)	Richie Gray	8(2)	1	0	6	1	0	14(2)	10
LK	(Scotland)	Alastair Kellock	9(1)	1	0	6	0	0	15(1)	0
LK	(Scotland)	Tom Ryder	17(5)	0	0	(5)	0	0	17(10)	0
LK	(New Zealand)	Rob Verbakel	6(4)	0	0	0	0	0	6(4)	0
BR	(Scotland)	John Barclay	6(3)	1	0	6	0	0	12(3)	5
BR	(Scotland)	Johnnie Beattie	6(6)	0	0	1(1)	0	0	7(7)	0
BR	(Scotland)	James Eddie	3(5)	1	0	0	0	0	3(5)	5
BR	(Scotland)	Chris Fusaro	19(2)	2	0	3(3)	0	0	22(5)	10
BR	(Scotland)	Calum Forrester	3(7)	0	0	0	0	0	3(7)	0
BR	(Scotland)	Rob Harley	19(2)	0	0	5	1	0	24(2)	5
BR	(Wales)	Rory Pitman	1(3)	0	0	0	0	0	1(3)	0
BR	(Scotland)	Ryan Wilson	13(5)	2	0	3(2)	0	0	16(7)	10
SH	(Scotland)	Chris Cusiter	8(2)	0	0	6	0	0	14(2)	0
SH	(Scotland)	Colin Gregor	3(4)	1	2	(1)	1	0	3(5)	12
SH	(Scotland)	Murray McConnell	(2)	0	0	0	0	0	(2)	0
SH	(Scotland)	Henry Pyrgos	12(8)	0	0	(2)	1	0	12(10)	5
FH	(Scotland)	Ruaridh Jackson	7(4)	1	68	1(1)	0	6	8(5)	79
FH	(Scotland)	Duncan Weir	15(3)	1	193	5(1)	0	58	20(4)	256
FH	(Scotland)	Scott Wight	1(7)	1	17	(2)	0	2	1(9)	24
CE	(Scotland)	Rob Dewey	8	0	0	1(1)	0	0	9(1)	0
CE	(Scotland)	Alex Dunbar	9(5)	0	0	0	0	0	9(5)	0
CE	(Scotland)	Peter Horne	1(5)	1	0	0	0	0	1(5)	5
CE	(Scotland)	Graeme Morrison	11(1)	0	0	5	0	0	16(1)	0
CE	(New Zealand)	Troy Nathan	13(2)	2	0	1(3)	0	0	14(5)	10
WG	(Argentina)	Federico Martín Aramburú	11(3)	0	0	2(2)	1	0	13(5)	5
WG	(Scotland)	Rory Lamont	1	0	0	4	1	0	5	5
WG	(Samoa)	David Lemi	10	0	0	0	0	0	10	0
WG	(Scotland)	Tommy Seymour	10(4)	2	0	4	1	0	14(4)	15
WG	(Scotland)	Colin Shaw	14(3)	3	0	4	0	0	18(3)	15
WG	(Canada)	D. T. H. van der Merwe	2(1)	2	0	0	0	0	2(1)	10
FB	(Scotland)	Stuart Hogg	15(1)	5	0	6	1	0	21(1)	30
FB	(Scotland)	Peter Murchie	10(2)	1	0	3(1)	0	0	13(3)	5

== Player movements ==
=== Player transfers ===
==== In ====
(Scotland) Tommy Seymour from (Ireland) Ulster
(England) Michael Cusack from (England) Doncaster Knights

== Competitions ==
=== Pre-season and friendlies ===
==== Match 1 ====
12 August 2011
7.30pm

Glasgow Warriors (Scotland)	17 - 7	(England) Newcastle Falcons
Try: Tommy Seymour; Stuart Hogg; Con: Duncan Weir x 2 Pen: Scott Wight	Preview; Report; Report	Try: Redford Pennycook; Con: Greg Goosen

Firhill Stadium
Attendance: 1961
Referee: Andy Macpherson (SRU)

Glasgow Warriors: 15 Peter Murchie; 14 Tommy Seymour, 13 Rob Dewey (Captain), 12 Troy Nathan, 11 Colin Shaw; 10 Scott Wight, 9 Henry Pyrgos; 1 Gordon Reid, 2 Pat MacArthur, 3 Ed Kalman, 4 Tom Ryder, 5 Nick Campbell, 6 James Eddie, 7 Chris Fusaro, 8 Ryan Wilson
Replacements: Finlay Gillies (for MacArthur, 62mins), Ryan Grant (for Reid, 20mins), Jon Welsh (for Grant, 50mins), Rob Harley (for Eddie, 29mins), Ross Doneghan (for Harley, 73mins), Rory Pitman (for Wilson, HT), Sean Kennedy (for Pyrgos, 73mins), Duncan Weir (for Wight, HT), Peter Horne (for Nathan, 50mins), Alex Dunbar (for Dewey, 50mins), Dave McCall (for Seymour, 56mins), Stuart Hogg (for Murchie, 32mins),
Newcastle Falcons: 15 Alex Tait; 14 Rikki Sheriffe, 13 Luke Eves, 12 Jamie Helleur, 11 Ryan Shortland; 10 Greg Goosen, 9 Jordi Pasqualin; 1 Grant Shiells, 2 Matt Thompson, 3 Ashley Wells, 4 Glen Townson, 5 Tim Swinson, 6 Will Welch, 7 Redford Pennycook, 8 Ally Hogg
Replacements: Darren Fearn, Joe Graham, Dan Frazier, Richard Boyle, Mark Wilson, Joe Robinson, Richard Mayhew, Will Chudley, Joel Hodgson, James Fitzpatrick, Chris Pilgrim, Luke Fielden

==== Match 2 ====
26 August 2011
7.45pm

Sale Sharks (England)	28 - 0	(Scotland) Glasgow Warriors
Try: Penalty try Rob Miller; David Seymour; Con: Nick Macleod x 2 Pen: Nick Macleod x 3	Preview; Report; Report; Report

Edgeley Park
Referee: Llyr Ap Geraint Roberts

Sale Sharks: 15. Rob Miller, 14. Tom Brady, 13. Andrew Higgins, 12. Luther Burrell, 11. Joaquin Tuculet, 10. Nick Macleod, 9. Dwayne Peel, 1. Tony Buckley, 2. Joe Ward, 3. Henry Thomas, 4. Kearnan Myall, 5. Fraser McKenzie, 6. James Gaskell, 7. David Seymour (capt.), 8. Mark Easter.
Replacements: 16. Marc Jones, 17. Lee Imiolek, 18. Vadim Cobilas, 19. Tommy Taylor, 20. Neil Briggs, 21. Scott Mathie, 22. Charlie Amesbury, 23. Kyle Tonetti, 24. Aston Croall, 25. Jordan Davies, 26. Tom Holmes.
Glasgow Warriors: 15 Stuart Hogg, 14 Federico Martín Aramburú, 13 Peter Horne, 12 Troy Nathan, 11 Dave McCall, 10 Duncan Weir, 9 Henry Pyrgos, 1 Ryan Grant, 2 Pat MacArthur, 3 Mike Cusack, 4 Tom Ryder, 5 Nick Campbell, 6 Rob Harley (capt.), 7 Chris Fusaro, 8 Rory Pitman.
Replacements: 16 Finlay Gillies, 17 Ed Kalman, 18 Jon Welsh, 19 Gordon Reid, 20 Colin Gregor, 21 Scott Wight, 22 Tommy Seymour, 23 Colin Shaw. Other substitutes: James Eddie, Ryan Wilson, Rob Dewey.

=== European Champions Cup ===
==== Pool 3 ====
Team	P	W	D	L	Tries for	Tries against	Try diff	Points for	Points against	Points diff	TB	LB	Pts
(Ireland) Leinster	6	5	1	0	18	7	+11	172	88	+84	2	0	24
(Scotland) Glasgow Warriors	6	2	1	3	8	12	−4	106	133	−27	0	2	12
(England) Bath	6	2	0	4	11	15	−4	122	151	−29	0	3	11
(France) Montpellier	6	1	2	3	8	11	−3	84	112	−28	0	2	10

==== Results ====
===== Round 1 =====
13 November 2011
12:45

Glasgow Warriors (Scotland)	26 – 21	(England) Bath
Try: Hogg 60' c Gray 80' c Con: Weir (2/2); Pen: Weir (4/6) 2', 34', 39', 73'	Report	Pen: Heathcote (6/6) 2', 18', 44', 56', 62', 67'; Donald (1/1) 78'

Firhill Stadium, Glasgow
Attendance: 4,208
Referee: Christophe Berdos (France)

===== Round 2 =====
20 November 2011
12:45

Leinster (Ireland)	38 – 13	(Scotland) Glasgow Warriors
Try: R. Kearney 4' c O'Malley (2) 25' c, 30' c D'Arcy 39' c Boss 80' c Con: Sexton (4/4); Madigan (1/1); Pen: Sexton (1/2) 15'	Report	Try: Pyrgos 73' c Con: Weir (1/1); Pen: Weir (2/2) 2', 22'

RDS Arena, Dublin
Attendance: 17,924
Referee: Andrew Small (England)

===== Round 3 =====
11 December 2011
12:45

Glasgow Warriors (Scotland)	20 – 15	(France) Montpellier
Try: Aramburú 73' m Pen: Weir (4/6) 12', 20', 33', 35'; Jackson (1/1) 67'	Report	Try: Escande 28' c Matadigo 80' m Con: Bustos Moyano (1/2); Pen: Bustos Moyano (1/1) 17'

Firhill Stadium, Glasgow
Attendance: 5,287
Referee: Greg Garner (England)

===== Round 4 =====
17 December 2011
16:40

Montpellier (France)	13 – 13	(Scotland) Glasgow Warriors
Try: Audrin 33' c Con: Perraux (1/1); Pen: Perraux (2/4) 46', 51'	Report	Try: Lamont 61' c Con: Weir (1/1); Pen: Jackson (1/2) 44'; Weir (1/2) 77'

Stade Yves-du-Manoir, Montpellier
Attendance: 7,917
Referee: Andrew Small (England)

===== Round 5 =====
15 January 2012
12:45

Glasgow Warriors (Scotland)	16 – 23	(Ireland) Leinster
Try: Gregor 63' c Con: Weir (1/1); Pen: Weir (3/3) 6', 32', 49'	Report	Try: R. Kearney 43' c Boss 70' c Con: McFadden (2/2); Pen: Sexton (1/2) 27'; McFadden (2/2) 40', 55'

Firhill Stadium, Glasgow
Attendance: 6,479
Referee: Nigel Owens (Wales)

===== Round 6 =====
21 January 2012
13:30

Bath (England)	23 – 18	(Scotland) Glasgow Warriors
Try: Biggs 10' c Skirving 43' c Con: Barkley (2/2); Pen: Barkley (3/3) 15', 68', 75'	Report	Try: Seymour 53' c Harley 62' m Con: Wight (1/2); Pen: Weir (2/3) 3', 13'

The Rec, Bath
Attendance: 11,015
Referee: John Lacey (Ireland)

=== RaboDirect Pro12 ===
==== League table ====
Pro12 Table
Pos	Team	Pld	W	D	L	PF	PA	PD	TF	TA	TB	LB	Pts	Qualification (Note: Qualification for the Heineken Cup is based on each country's allocation, i.e. three highest-ranked Irish teams, three highest-ranked Welsh teams, both Italian teams and both Scottish teams. Because Leinster won the 2012 Heineken Cup Final, Ireland earned an extra Heineken Cup place, which will go to Connacht. Aironi were denied a licence for the 2012–13 season due to financial issues; the newly established Zebre side replaced Aironi in the Pro12 and Heineken Cup.)
1	(Ireland) Leinster (F)	22	18	1	3	568	326	+242	48	28	5	2	81	Play-off place
2	(Wales) Ospreys (C)	22	16	1	5	491	337	+154	44	22	2	3	71	Play-off place
3	(Ireland) Munster (SF)	22	14	1	7	489	367	+122	45	27	5	4	67	Play-off place
4	(Scotland) Glasgow Warriors (SF)	22	13	4	5	445	321	+124	34	23	2	3	65	Play-off place
5	(Wales) Scarlets	22	12	2	8	446	373	+73	43	30	5	5	62	
6	(Ireland) Ulster	22	12	0	10	474	424	+50	53	41	5	3	56	
7	(Wales) Cardiff Blues	22	10	0	12	446	460	−14	43	45	5	5	50	
8	(Ireland) Connacht	22	7	1	14	321	433	−112	27	36	0	7	37	
9	(Wales) Newport Gwent Dragons	22	7	1	14	370	474	−104	27	41	1	5	36	
10	(Italy) Benetton Treviso	22	7	0	15	419	558	−139	41	57	3	5	36	
11	(Scotland) Edinburgh	22	6	1	15	454	588	−134	42	65	2	4	32	
12	(Italy) Aironi	22	4	0	18	289	551	−262	22	54	1	5	22	

Updated to match(es) played on 5 May 2012. Source: RaboDirect PRO12
Rules for classification: If teams are level at any stage, tiebreakers are applied in the following order:
1. number of matches won;
2. the difference between points for and points against;
3. the number of tries scored;
4. the most points scored;
5. the difference between tries for and tries against;
6. the fewest red cards received;
7. the fewest yellow cards received.
  (C) Champions; (F) Lost in the final; (SF) Lost in the semi-finals
  Notes:

==== Results ====
===== Round 1 =====
2 September 2011
19:05

Ulster (Ireland)	28 – 14	(Scotland) Glasgow Warriors
	Report

Ravenhill, Belfast
Attendance: 6,296
Referee: Leighton Hodges

===== Round 2 =====
9 September 2011
19:30

Glasgow Warriors (Scotland)	12 – 23	(Ireland) Munster
	Report

Firhill Stadium, Glasgow
Attendance: 2,914
Referee: Dudley Phillips

===== Round 3 =====
17 September 2011
18:00

(1 BP) Leinster (Ireland)	19 – 23	(Scotland) Glasgow Warriors
	Report

RDS Arena, Dublin
Attendance: 14,686
Referee: Andrew McMenemy

===== Round 4 =====
23 September 2011
19:30

(1 BP) Glasgow Warriors (Scotland)	13 – 15	(Italy) Benetton Treviso
	Report

Firhill Stadium, Glasgow
Attendance: 2,864
Referee: Alan Falzone

===== Round 5 =====
1 October 2011
18:30

Cardiff Blues (Wales)	13 – 34	(Scotland) Glasgow Warriors (1 BP)
	Report

Cardiff City Stadium, Cardiff
Attendance: 8,198
Referee: John Lacey

===== Round 6 =====
7 October 2011
19:30

Glasgow Warriors (Scotland)	24 – 19	(Wales) Newport Gwent Dragons (1 BP)
	Report

Firhill Stadium, Glasgow
Attendance: 2,705
Referee: Marius Mitrea

===== Round 7 =====
28 October 2011
19:05

Glasgow Warriors (Scotland)	28 – 17	(Wales) Ospreys
	Report

Firhill Stadium, Glasgow
Attendance: 3,443
Referee: Carlo Damasco

===== Round 8 =====
5 November 2011
14:30

Aironi (Italy)	6 – 18	(Scotland) Glasgow Warriors
	Report

Stadio Luigi Zaffanella, Viadana
Attendance: 2,200
Referee: Dudley Phillips

===== Round 9 =====
25 November 2011
19:35

Glasgow Warriors (Scotland)	17 – 9	(Ireland) Ulster
	Report

Firhill Stadium, Glasgow
Attendance: 3,940
Referee: Stefano Penne

===== Round 10 =====
4 December 2011
16:30

Newport Gwent Dragons (Wales)	14 – 14	(Scotland) Glasgow Warriors
	Report

Rodney Parade, Newport
Attendance: 5,273
Referee: David Wilkinson

===== Round 11: 1872 Cup (1st Leg) =====
26 December 2011
17:35

Edinburgh (Scotland)	23 – 23	(Scotland) Glasgow Warriors
	Report

Murrayfield Stadium, Edinburgh
Attendance: 13,246
Referee: Neil Paterson

===== Round 12: 1872 Cup (2nd Leg) =====
1 January 2012
17:35

Glasgow Warriors (Scotland)	17 – 12	(Scotland) Edinburgh (1 BP)
	Report

Firhill Stadium, Glasgow
Attendance: 8,852
Referee: Peter Allan

Glasgow Warriors won the 1872 Cup with an aggregate score of 40 - 35.

===== Round 13 =====
7 January 2012
18:15

Scarlets (Wales)	16 – 14	(Scotland) Glasgow Warriors (1 BP)
	Report

Parc y Scarlets, Llanelli
Attendance: 9,869
Referee: Dudley Phillips

===== Round 14 =====
9 February 2012
19:05

Glasgow Warriors (Scotland)	19 – 9	(Wales) Scarlets
	Report

Firhill Stadium, Glasgow
Attendance: 2,665
Referee: Nigel Owens

===== Round 15 =====
18 February 2012
17:30

Connacht (Ireland)	13 – 13	(Scotland) Glasgow Warriors
	Report

Galway Sportsgrounds, Galway
Attendance: 4,189
Referee: Peter Allan

===== Round 16 =====
25 February 2012
18:00

Glasgow Warriors (Scotland)	10 – 10	(Ireland) Leinster
	Report

Firhill Stadium, Glasgow
Attendance: 3,115
Referee: John Lacey

===== Round 17 =====
2 March 2012
19:05

(1 BP) Ospreys (Wales)	20 – 26	(Scotland) Glasgow Warriors
	Report

Liberty Stadium, Swansea
Attendance: 5,782
Referee: Neil Paterson

===== Round 18 =====
23 March 2012
19:35

Glasgow Warriors (Scotland)	29 – 6	(Italy) Aironi
	Report

Firhill Stadium, Glasgow
Attendance: 4,110
Referee: Dudley Phillips

===== Round 19 =====
30 March 2012
19:30

(1 BP) Glasgow Warriors (Scotland)	31 – 3	(Wales) Cardiff Blues
	Report

Firhill Stadium, Glasgow
Attendance: 4,224
Referee: George Clancy

===== Round 20 =====
14 April 2012
19:15

Munster (Ireland)	35 – 29	(Scotland) Glasgow Warriors (1 BP)
	Report

Musgrave Park, Cork
Attendance: 8,742
Referee: Nigel Owens

===== Round 21 =====
22 April 2012
15:05

(1 BP) Benetton Treviso (Italy)	8 – 13	(Scotland) Glasgow Warriors
	Report

Stadio Comunale di Monigo, Treviso
Attendance: 4,200
Referee: Leighton Hodges

===== Round 22 =====
5 May 2012
19:30

Glasgow Warriors (Scotland)	24 – 3	(Ireland) Connacht
	Report

Firhill Stadium, Glasgow
Attendance: 5,374
Referee: Peter Fitzgibbon

==== Playoffs ====
===== Semi-finals =====
12 May 2012
19:35

Leinster (Ireland)	19 – 15	(Scotland) Glasgow Warriors
Try: D. Kearney 66' c Con: Sexton (1/1); Pen: Sexton (4/4) 7', 23', 38', 63'	Report	Try: Hall 77' m Hogg 80' c Con: Jackson (1/2); Pen: Weir (1/3) 9'

RDS Arena, Dublin
Attendance: 15,113
Referee: George Clancy

== End of Season awards ==
Award	Winner
Young Player of the Season	(Scotland) Stuart Hogg
Coaches Player of the Season	(Scotland) Chris Fusaro
Players' Player of the Season	(Scotland) Chris Fusaro
Try of the Season	(Scotland) Peter Horne vs. (Ireland) Leinster
Spirit of Rugby Award	(Scotland) Sean Lineen
Player of the Season	(Scotland) Chris Fusaro

== Competitive debuts this season ==
A player's nationality shown is taken from the nationality at the highest honour for the national side obtained; or if never capped internationally their place of birth. Senior caps take precedence over junior caps or place of birth; junior caps take precedence over place of birth. A player's nationality at debut may be different from the nationality shown. Combination sides like the British and Irish Lions or Pacific Islanders are not national sides, or nationalities.

Players in BOLD font have been capped by their senior international XV side as nationality shown.

Players in Italic font have capped either by their international 7s side; or by the international XV 'A' side as nationality shown.

Players in normal font have not been capped at senior level.

A position in parentheses indicates that the player debuted as a substitute. A player may have made a prior debut for Glasgow Warriors in a non-competitive match, 'A' match or 7s match; these matches are not listed.

Tournaments where competitive debut made:

**Scottish Inter-District Championship**	**Welsh–Scottish League**	**WRU Challenge Cup**	**Celtic League**	**Celtic Cup**	**1872 Cup**	**Pro12**	**Pro14**	**Rainbow Cup**	**United Rugby Championship**	**European Challenge Cup**	**Heineken Cup / European Champions Cup**

Crosshatching indicates a jointly hosted match.

Number	Player nationality	Name	Position	Date of debut	Venue	Stadium	Opposition nationality	Opposition side	Tournament	Match result	Scoring debut
194	(Scotland)	**Michael Cusack**	Prop	2011-09-02	Away	Ravenhill Stadium	(Ireland)	Ulster	Pro12	Loss	Nil
195	(New Zealand)	Troy Nathan	Centre	2011-09-02	Away	Ravenhill Stadium	(Ireland)	Ulster	Pro12	Loss	5 pts
196	(Scotland)	**Tommy Seymour**	Wing	2011-09-02	Away	Ravenhill Stadium	(Ireland)	Ulster	Pro12	Loss	Nil
197	(Scotland)	Nick Campbell	(Lock)	2011-09-02	Away	Ravenhill Stadium	(Ireland)	Ulster	Pro12	Loss	Nil
198	(Wales)	Rory Pitman	(No. 8)	2011-09-02	Away	Ravenhill Stadium	(Ireland)	Ulster	Pro12	Loss	Nil
199	(Scotland)	Scott Wight	(Fly half)	2011-09-09	Home	Firhill Stadium	(Ireland)	Munster	Pro12	Loss	Nil
200	(Netherlands)	**Rob Verbakel**	Lock	2011-10-01	Away	Cardiff City Stadium	(Wales)	Cardiff Blues	Pro12	Win	Nil
201	(Samoa)	**David Lemi**	Wing	2011-11-25	Home	Firhill Stadium	(Ireland)	Ulster	Pro12	Win	Nil
202	(Scotland)	Murray McConnell	(Scrum half)	2012-01-07	Away	Parc y Scarlets	(Wales)	Scarlets	Pro12	Loss	Nil

== Sponsorship ==
=== Official kit supplier ===
Canterbury - Official kit supplier
