= 2010–11 Glasgow Warriors season =

Glasgow Warriors 2010 / 2011
- Ground: Firhill Stadium (Capacity: 10,887)
- Coach: (Scotland) Sean Lineen
- Captain: (Scotland) Alastair Kellock
- Most caps: (Scotland) Rob Harley (Scotland) Colin Gregor (27)
- Top scorer: (Scotland) Ruaridh Jackson (180)
- Most tries: (Canada) D. T. H. van der Merwe (12)
- League: Celtic League
- 11th
Team kit	2nd kit

The 2010–11 season saw Glasgow Warriors compete in the competitions: the Magners Celtic League and the European Champions Cup, the Heineken Cup.

== Team ==
=== Squad ===
Hookers (Scotland) Finlay Gillies (Scotland) Dougie Hall (Scotland) Pat MacArthur (Scotland) Fergus Thomson Props (Scotland) Ryan Grant (Scotland) Ed Kalman (Scotland) Moray Low (Scotland) Gordon Reid (Canada) Kevin Tkachuk (Scotland) Jon Welsh Locks (Scotland) Nick Campbell (Scotland) Richie Gray (Scotland) Alastair Kellock (Scotland) Aly Muldowney (Scotland) Tom Ryder	Loose forwards (Scotland) John Barclay (Scotland) Johnnie Beattie (Scotland) Paul Burke (Scotland) Rob Harley (Scotland) James Eddie (Scotland) Calum Forrester (Scotland) Chris Fusaro (Canada) Chauncey O'Toole (Scotland) Steve Swindall (Scotland) Ryan Wilson (Scotland) Richie Vernon Scrum-halves (England) Will Cliff (Scotland) Chris Cusiter (Scotland) Colin Gregor (Scotland) Henry Pyrgos Fly-halves (Scotland) Ruaridh Jackson (Scotland) Duncan Weir	Centres (Scotland) Mark Bennett (Scotland) Alex Dunbar (Scotland) Max Evans (Scotland) Peter Horne (Scotland) Graeme Morrison (Scotland) Peter Murchie Back three (Argentina) Federico Martín Aramburú (Scotland) Rob Dewey (Scotland) James Fleming (Scotland) Stuart Hogg (Scotland) Dave McCall (Scotland) Hefin O'Hare (Scotland) Colin Shaw (Argentina) Bernardo Stortoni (Canada) D. T. H. van der Merwe

==== Academy players ====
- (Scotland) George Hunter - Prop
- (Scotland) Murray McConnell - Scrum-half
- (Scotland) James Johnstone - Centre
- (Scotland) Mike Doneghan - Wing
- (Scotland) Kerr Gossman - Wing

==== Back-up players ====
- (Scotland) Kris Hamilton (Glasgow Hawks) – Scrum-half

== Player statistics ==
During the 2010–11 season, Glasgow have used 43 different players in competitive games. The table below shows the number of appearances and points scored by each player.

Position	Nation	Name	Celtic League			Champions Cup			Total	
Position	Nation	Name	Apps (sub)	Tries	Points kicked	Apps (sub)	Tries	Points kicked	Apps (sub)	Total pts
HK	(Scotland)	Finlay Gillies	(1)	0	0	0	0	0	(1)	0
HK	(Scotland)	Dougie Hall	6(5)	0	0	3(2)	1	0	9(7)	5
HK	(Scotland)	Pat MacArthur	1(10)	0	0	(2)	0	0	1(12)	0
HK	(Scotland)	Fergus Thomson	15(4)	1	0	3(2)	1	0	18(6)	5
PR	(Scotland)	Ryan Grant	8(9)	2	0	1(4)	0	0	9(13)	10
PR	(Scotland)	Ed Kalman	9(4)	0	0	(3)	0	0	9(7)	0
PR	(Scotland)	Moray Low	13(4)	0	0	6	0	0	19(4)	0
PR	(Scotland)	Gordon Reid	(1)	0	0	0	0	0	(1)	0
PR	(Canada)	Kevin Tkachuk	1(17)	1	0	(4)	1	0	1(21)	5
PR	(Scotland)	Jon Welsh	13(7)	1	0	5(1)	0	0	18(8)	5
LK	(Scotland)	Richie Gray	10	2	0	5	0	0	15	10
LK	(Scotland)	Alastair Kellock	5	0	0	4	0	0	9	0
LK	(Scotland)	Aly Muldowney	13(7)	2	0	1(3)	0	0	14(10)	10
LK	(Scotland)	Tom Ryder	15(2)	1	0	2	0	0	17(2)	5
BR	(Scotland)	John Barclay	8	0	0	4	0	0	12	0
BR	(Scotland)	Johnnie Beattie	7(3)	0	0	0	0	0	7(3)	0
BR	(Scotland)	Paul Burke	(1)	0	0	(1)	0	0	(2)	0
BR	(Scotland)	James Eddie	5(2)	0	0	0	0	0	5(2)	0
BR	(Scotland)	Calum Forrester	8(4)	0	0	(2)	0	0	8(6)	0
BR	(Scotland)	Chris Fusaro	(8)	0	0	(4)	0	0	(12)	0
BR	(Scotland)	Rob Harley	16(5)	1	0	6	0	0	22(5)	5
BR	(Canada)	Chauncey O'Toole	1	0	0	0	0	0	1	0
BR	(Scotland)	Richie Vernon	14	1	0	6	0	0	20	5
BR	(Scotland)	Ryan Wilson	8(7)	0	0	2(1)	0	0	10(8)	0
SH	(Scotland)	Chris Cusiter	3	0	0	0	0	0	3	0
SH	(Scotland)	Colin Gregor	15(6)	2	14	5(1)	2	2	20(7)	36
SH	(Scotland)	Henry Pyrgos	5(8)	0	0	1(5)	0	0	6(13)	0
FH	(Scotland)	Ruaridh Jackson	13(3)	0	111	6	1	64	19(3)	180
FH	(Scotland)	Duncan Weir	8(10)	1	111	(1)	0	0	8(11)	116
CE	(Scotland)	Mark Bennett	1	0	0	0	0	0	1	0
CE	(Scotland)	Rob Dewey	2(1)	0	0	(2)	0	0	2(3)	0
CE	(Scotland)	Alex Dunbar	4(2)	1	0	0	0	0	4(2)	5
CE	(Scotland)	Max Evans	10	1	0	4	0	0	14	5
CE	(Scotland)	Peter Horne	3(9)	0	0	(2)	0	0	3(11)	0
CE	(Scotland)	Graeme Morrison	12	2	0	4	1	0	16	15
WG	(Argentina)	Federico Martín Aramburú	14(4)	2	0	5(1)	1	0	19(5)	15
WG	(Scotland)	Dave McCall	(1)	0	0	0	0	0	(1)	0
WG	(Scotland)	Hefin O'Hare	11(5)	2	0	2(2)	0	0	13(7)	10
WG	(Scotland)	Colin Shaw	3(2)	0	0	2	0	0	5(2)	0
WG	(Canada)	D. T. H. van der Merwe	19	9	0	5	3	0	24	60
FB	(Scotland)	Stuart Hogg	2	0	0	0	0	0	2	0
FB	(Scotland)	Peter Murchie	13(2)	2	0	2(2)	0	0	15(4)	10
FB	(Argentina)	Bernardo Stortoni	16(2)	0	0	6	0	0	22(2)	0

== Player movements ==
=== Player transfers ===
==== In ====
(Scotland) Steve Swindall from (England) Rotherham Titans

==== Out ====
(Scotland) Steve Swindall to (Italy) Amatori Rugby Milano

== Competitions ==
=== Pre-season and friendlies ===
==== Match 1 ====
8 August 2010
3pm

Dundee HSFP (Scotland)	7 - 71	(Scotland) Glasgow Warriors
Try: ? Con: ?	Preview; Report; Report	Try: Rob Dewey; Ryan Wilson; Chauncey O'Toole x 2 Hefin O'Hare; Steve Swindall x 2 Alex Dunbar; Duncan Weir; Peter Horne; Murray McConnell; Con: Duncan Weir x 7 Peter Horne

Mayfield Playing Fields

Dundee HSFP:
Replacements:
Glasgow Warriors: Colin Shaw, Richie Gray, Kevin Tkachuk, Aly Muldowney, Ryan Wilson, Duncan Weir, Chris Fusaro, Ed Kalman, Steve Swindall, Michael Doneghan, Rob Dewey, Federico Martín Aramburú, Hefin O'Hare, Chauncey O'Toole, Finlay Gillies, Gordon Reid, Murray McConnell, Alex Dunbar, Peter Horne, Ryan Grant, Peter Murchie, Kris Hamilton (Glasgow Hawks)

==== Match 2 ====
20 August 2010
7.30pm

Glasgow Warriors (Scotland)	22 - 23	(England) Sale Sharks
Try: Ryan Grant; Max Evans; Richie Gray x 2 Con: Duncan Weir	Preview; Report; Report	Try: Anitelea Tuilagi; Jack Forster; Tom Brady; Con: Nick Macleod; Pen: Nick Macleod; Rob Miller

Firhill Stadium
Attendance: 2290
Referee: Neil Paterson (SRU)

Glasgow Warriors: Bernardo Stortoni (c); D. T. H. van der Merwe, Max Evans, Rob Dewey, Federico Martín Aramburú; Ruaridh Jackson, Henry Pyrgos; Ryan Grant, Fergus Thomson, Moray Low, Aly Muldowney, Richie Gray, Ryan Wilson, Chris Fusaro, Richie Vernon
Replacements (all used): Paul Burke, Alex Dunbar, Calum Forrester, Finlay Gillies, Rob Harley, Peter Horne, Ed Kalman, Pat MacArthur, Murray McConnell, Peter Murchie, Colin Shaw, Stevie Swindall, Kevin Tkachuk, Duncan Weir
Sale Sharks: Paul Williams; Tom Brady, Fergus Mulchrone, Nick Macleod, Ben Cohen; Matty James, Dwayne Peel; Aston Croall, Neil Briggs, Karena Wihongi, Nic Rouse, James Gaskell (c), Carl Fearns, James Harris, Sisaro Koyamaibole
Replacements: Kyle Tonetti, Anitelea Tuilagi, Rhys Crane, Rob Miller, Chris Leck, Jack Forster, Simon McIntyre, Marc Jones, Sean Cox, Wame Lewaravu, David Seymour, Kristian Ormsby

==== Match 3 ====
28 August 2010
3pm

Wasps (England)	36 - 17	(Scotland) Glasgow Warriors
Try: Joe Simpson x 2 Tom Varndell; Christian Wade; Zak Taulafu; Jack Wallace; Con: Mark Van Gisbergen x 3	Preview; Report; Report	Try: D. T. H. van der Merwe; Ryan Wilson; Con: Duncan Weir; Ruaridh Jackson; Pen: Duncan Weir

Adams Park

Wasps: Mark Van Gisbergen, Richard Haughton, Ben Jacobs, Dom Waldouck, Tom Varndell, Riki Flutey, Joe Simpson, Tim Payne, Rob Webber, Phil Vickery, Simon Shaw, Richard Birkett, Joe Worsley, Tom Rees (c), John Hart
Replacements: Tom Lindsay, Zak Taulafo, Ben Broster, Dan Ward-Smith, Serge Betsen, Nic Berry, Dave Walder, Jack Wallace, James Cannon, Sam Jones, Christian Wade
Glasgow Warriors: Bernardo Stortoni (c), D. T. H. van der Merwe, Max Evans, Graeme Morrison, Hefin O'Hare, Duncan Weir, Henry Pyrgos, Jon Welsh, Fergus Thomson, Moray Low, Tom Ryder, Richie Gray, Stevie Swindall, Calum Forrester, Richie Vernon
Replacements: Pat MacArthur, Kevin Tkachuk, Aly Muldowney, Ryan Grant, Ruaridh Jackson, Colin Shaw, Peter Murchie, Peter Horne, Will Cliff, Robert Harley, Alex Dunbar, Ryan Wilson

=== European Champions Cup ===
==== Pool 6 ====
Team	P	W	D	L	Tries for	Tries against	Try diff	Points for	Points against	Points diff	TB	LB	Pts
(France) Toulouse (5)	6	5	0	1	15	6	+10	155	85	+70	1	1	22
(England) London Wasps [5]	6	4	0	2	15	6	+8	145	106	+59	2	1	19
(Scotland) Glasgow Warriors	6	3	0	3	10	15	−5	116	141	−25	0	0	12
(Wales) Newport Gwent Dragons	6	0	0	6	5	18	−13	77	161	−84	0	2	2

==== Results ====
===== Round 1 =====
8 October 2010
19:30

Glasgow Warriors (Scotland)	21 – 13	(Wales) Newport Gwent Dragons
Try: Morrison 24' c Thomson 44' m Con: Jackson (1/2); Pen: Jackson (3/3) 21', 24', 31'; Weir (0/1)	Report	Try: Hughes 18' c Con: M. Jones (1/1); Pen: M. Jones (2/3) 40', 43'

Firhill Stadium
Attendance: 2,597
Referee: Jérôme Garces (France)

===== Round 2 =====
17 October 2010
13:00

London Wasps (England)	38 – 26	(Scotland) Glasgow Warriors
Try: Simpson 7' m Varndell 25' c Jacobs 39' c Waldouck 63' c Con: Walder (3/4); Pen: Walder (4/5) 18', 21', 34', 50'	Report	Try: Jackson 28' c Hall 67' c Con: Jackson (1/1); Hall (1/1); Pen: Jackson (4/5) 16', 32', 48', 59'

Adams Park, High Wycombe
Attendance: 6,759
Referee: Pascal Gauzere (France)

===== Round 3 =====
10 December 2010
20:00

Glasgow Warriors (Scotland)	16 - 28	(France) Toulouse
Try: Aramburú 24' c Con: Jackson (1/1); Pen: Jackson (3/5) 1', 11', 38'	Report	Try: Fritz 7' c Jauzion 22' c Heymans 35' m Con: Skrela (2/3); Pen: Skrela (3/3) 17', 32', 51'

Firhill Stadium
Attendance: 2,946
Referee: James Jones (Wales)

===== Round 4 =====
21 December 2010
19:00

Toulouse (France)	36 - 10	(Scotland) Glasgow Warriors
Try: Médard 10' c Lacombe 23' c Poitrenaud 55' c Dusautoir 64' c Clerc 67' m Con: Skrela (4/5); Pen: Skrela 43'	Report	Try: Van der Merwe 41' c Con: Jackson (1/1); Pen: Jackson 17'

Stade Ernest Wallon, Toulouse
Attendance: 18,418
Referee: John Lacey (Ireland)

- This match was postponed twice from its originally scheduled kickoff of 18 December. Weather-related travel delays prevented Glasgow from arriving in Toulouse until hours before the planned kickoff, causing a postponement to 19 December. The team's equipment, which was travelling on a separate flight, was further delayed, leading to the second postponement.

===== Round 5 =====
16 January 2011
13:00

Glasgow Warriors (Scotland)	20 - 10	(England) London Wasps
Try: Gregor 49' m Pen: Jackson (4/6) 2', 15', 43', 65'; Drop: Jackson 75'	Report	Try: Varndell 11' c Con: Walder (1/1); Pen: Walder (1/2) 6'

Firhill Stadium
Attendance: 2,564
Referee: James Jones (Wales)

===== Round 6 =====
23 January 2011
15:00

Newport Gwent Dragons (Wales)	16 – 23	(Scotland) Glasgow Warriors
Try: Brew 49' c Con: Tovey (1/1); Pen: Tovey (2/4) 38', 45'; Drop: Tovey 15'	Report	Try: Gregor 55' m Van der Merwe (2) 64' m, 71' c Con: Jackson (1/3); Pen: Jackson (2/2) 4', 32'

Rodney Parade
Attendance: 5,284
Referee: JP Doyle (England)

=== Magners Celtic League ===
==== League table ====
	Team	Pld	W	D	L	PF	PA	PD	TF	TA	Try bonus	Losing bonus	Pts
1	(Ireland) Munster	22	19	0	3	496	327	+169	44	22	5	2	83
2	(Ireland) Leinster	22	15	1	6	495	336	+159	50	25	5	3	70
3	(Ireland) Ulster	22	15	1	6	480	418	+62	44	35	3	2	67
4	(Wales) Ospreys	22	12	1	9	553	418	+135	56	29	6	7	63
5	(Wales) Scarlets	22	12	1	9	503	453	+50	49	43	5	7	62
6	(Wales) Cardiff Blues	22	13	1	8	479	392	+87	37	33	3	3	60
7	(Wales) Newport Gwent Dragons	22	10	1	11	444	462	−18	47	49	3	4	49
8	(Scotland) Edinburgh	22	9	0	13	421	460	−39	39	44	2	5	43
9	(Ireland) Connacht	22	7	1	14	394	459	−65	32	44	3	6	39
10	(Italy) Benetton Treviso	22	9	0	13	374	502	−128	29	58	0	2	38
11	(Scotland) Glasgow Warriors	22	6	1	15	401	543	−142	33	48	1	6	33
12	(Italy) Aironi	22	1	0	21	247	517	−270	21	52	0	8	12
Under the standard bonus point system, points are awarded as follows: 4 points for a win; 2 points for a draw; 1 bonus point for scoring 4 tries (or more) (Try bonus); 1 bonus point for losing by 7 points (or fewer) (Losing bonus)
Green background (rows 1 to 4) are play-off places. Correct as of 7 May 2011. Source: RaboDirect PRO12

==== Results ====
===== Round 1 =====
3 September 2010
19:05

Glasgow Warriors (Scotland)	22 – 19	(Ireland) Leinster (1 BP)
	Report

Firhill Stadium
Attendance: 2,879
Referee: Tim Hayes

===== Round 2 =====
12 September 2010
16:10

Newport Gwent Dragons (Wales)	23 – 11	(Scotland) Glasgow Warriors
	Report

Rodney Parade
Attendance: 5,028
Referee: Carlo Damasco

===== Round 3 =====
17 September 2010
19:30

(1 BP) Glasgow Warriors (Scotland)	17 – 19	(Ireland) Connacht
	Report

Firhill Stadium
Attendance: 3,049
Referee: Leighton Hodges

===== Round 4 =====
24 September 2010
19:30

Glasgow Warriors (Scotland)	29 – 43	(Ireland) Munster (1 BP)
	Report

Firhill Stadium
Attendance: 3,432
Referee: Carlo Damasco

===== Round 5 =====
1 October 2010
19:05

Ulster (Ireland)	19 – 17	(Scotland) Glasgow Warriors (1 BP)
	Report

Ravenhill
Attendance: 7,822

===== Round 6 =====
24 October 2010
16:10

Glasgow Warriors (Scotland)	31 – 23	(Wales) Ospreys
	Report

Firhill Stadium
Attendance: 2,554
Referee: David Wilkinson

===== Round 7 =====
29 October 2010
20:05

Scarlets (Wales)	18 – 14	(Scotland) Glasgow Warriors (1 BP)
	Report

Parc y Scarlets
Attendance: 7,149
Referee: Peter Fitzgibbon

===== Round 8 =====
5 November 2010
19:30

Glasgow Warriors (Scotland)	33 – 8	(Italy) Aironi
	Report

Firhill Stadium
Attendance: 2,078

===== Round 9 =====
27 November 2010
13:30

(1 BP) Cardiff Blues (Wales)	38 – 6	(Scotland) Glasgow Warriors
	Report

Cardiff City Stadium
Attendance: 3,760
Referee: Dudley Phillips

===== Round 10 =====
18 March 2010
19:30

Glasgow Warriors (Scotland)	25 – 17	(Italy) Benetton Treviso
	Report

Firhill Stadium
Attendance: 1,369
Referee: George Clancy

===== Round 11: 1872 Cup (1st Leg) =====
27 December 2010
17:35

Glasgow Warriors (Scotland)	30 – 18	(Scotland) Edinburgh
	Report

Firhill Stadium
Attendance: 7,062
Referee: Andy Macpherson (SRU)

===== Round 12: 1872 Cup (2nd Leg) =====
2 January 2011
17:35

Edinburgh (Scotland)	28 – 17	(Scotland) Glasgow Warriors
	Report

Murrayfield
Attendance: 9,292
Referee: Neil Paterson (SRU)

Glasgow Warriors won the 1872 Cup with an aggregate score of 47 - 46.

===== Round 13 =====
8 January 2011
19:30

Munster (Ireland)	22 – 20	(Scotland) Glasgow Warriors (1 BP)
	Report

Musgrave Park
Attendance: 8,500

===== Round 14 =====
11 February 2011
19:35

Glasgow Warriors (Scotland)	15 – 26	(Wales) Cardiff Blues
	Report

Firhill Stadium
Attendance: 1,917
Referee: Dudley Phillips

===== Round 15 =====
18 February 2011
19:00

(1 BP) Connacht (Ireland)	37 – 8	(Scotland) Glasgow Warriors
	Report

Sportsground
Attendance: 1,268

===== Round 16 =====
25 February 2011
19:50

Glasgow Warriors (Scotland)	16 – 16	(Wales) Newport Gwent Dragons
	Report

Firhill Stadium
Attendance: 1,709
Referee: Peter Fitzgibbon

===== Round 17 =====
5 March 2011
17:30

Ospreys (Wales)	37 – 6	(Scotland) Glasgow Warriors
	Report

Liberty Stadium
Attendance: 5,642

===== Round 18 =====
25 March 2011
20:05

(1 BP) Glasgow Warriors (Scotland)	19 – 22	(Ireland) Ulster
	Report

Firhill Stadium
Attendance: 2,715
Referee: David Jones

===== Round 19 =====
2 April 2011
15:30

(1 BP) Aironi (Italy)	16 – 17	(Scotland) Glasgow Warriors
	Report

Stadio Zaffanella
Attendance: 2,700

===== Round 20 =====
16 April 2011
15:00

Benetton Treviso (Italy)	19 – 16	(Scotland) Glasgow Warriors
	Report

Stadio di Monigo
Attendance: 4,000

===== Round 21 =====
22 April 2011
20:05

Glasgow Warriors (Scotland)	29 – 37	(Wales) Scarlets
	Report

Firhill Stadium
Attendance: 3,873

===== Round 22 =====
6 May 2011
19:05

Leinster (Ireland)	38 – 3	(Scotland) Glasgow Warriors
	Report

RDS Arena
Attendance: 12,318
Referee: James Jones

== End of Season awards ==
Award	Winner
Player of the Season	(Scotland) Rob Harley
Try of the Season	(Argentina) Federico Martín Aramburú vs. (France) Toulouse

== Competitive debuts this season ==
A player's nationality shown is taken from the nationality at the highest honour for the national side obtained; or if never capped internationally their place of birth. Senior caps take precedence over junior caps or place of birth; junior caps take precedence over place of birth. A player's nationality at debut may be different from the nationality shown. Combination sides like the British and Irish Lions or Pacific Islanders are not national sides, or nationalities.

Players in BOLD font have been capped by their senior international XV side as nationality shown.

Players in Italic font have capped either by their international 7s side; or by the international XV 'A' side as nationality shown.

Players in normal font have not been capped at senior level.

A position in parentheses indicates that the player debuted as a substitute. A player may have made a prior debut for Glasgow Warriors in a non-competitive match, 'A' match or 7s match; these matches are not listed.

Tournaments where competitive debut made:

**Scottish Inter-District Championship**	**Welsh–Scottish League**	**WRU Challenge Cup**	**Celtic League**	**Celtic Cup**	**1872 Cup**	**Pro12**	**Pro14**	**Rainbow Cup**	**United Rugby Championship**	**European Challenge Cup**	**Heineken Cup / European Champions Cup**

Crosshatching indicates a jointly hosted match.

Number	Player nationality	Name	Position	Date of debut	Venue	Stadium	Opposition nationality	Opposition side	Tournament	Match result	Scoring debut
182	(Scotland)	**Tom Ryder**	Lock	2010-09-03	Home	Firhill Stadium	(Ireland)	Leinster	Celtic League	Win	Nil
183	(Scotland)	**Ryan Wilson**	Flanker	2010-09-03	Home	Firhill Stadium	(Ireland)	Leinster	Celtic League	Win	Nil
184	(Scotland)	**Henry Pyrgos**	Scrum half	2010-09-03	Home	Firhill Stadium	(Ireland)	Leinster	Celtic League	Win	Nil
185	(Argentina)	**Federico Martín Aramburú**	Wing	2010-09-03	Home	Firhill Stadium	(Ireland)	Leinster	Celtic League	Win	Nil
186	(Scotland)	**Ryan Grant**	(Prop)	2010-09-03	Home	Firhill Stadium	(Ireland)	Leinster	Celtic League	Win	Nil
187	(England)	Aly Muldowney	(Lock)	2010-09-03	Home	Firhill Stadium	(Ireland)	Leinster	Celtic League	Win	Nil
188	(Scotland)	**Rob Harley**	(Flanker)	2010-09-03	Home	Firhill Stadium	(Ireland)	Leinster	Celtic League	Win	Nil
189	(Canada)	**Chauncey O'Toole**	Flanker	2010-09-12	Away	Rodney Parade	(Wales)	Dragons	Celtic League	Loss	Nil
190	(Scotland)	Finlay Gillies	(Hooker)	2011-02-11	Home	Firhill Stadium	(Wales)	Cardiff Blues	Celtic League	Loss	Nil
191	(Scotland)	**Stuart Hogg**	Full back	2011-02-25	Home	Firhill Stadium	(Wales)	Dragons	Celtic League	Draw	Nil
192	(Scotland)	**Gordon Reid**	(Flanker)	2011-03-05	Away	Liberty Stadium	(Wales)	Ospreys	Celtic League	Loss	Nil
193	(Scotland)	**Mark Bennett**	Centre	2011-05-06	Away	RDS Arena	(Ireland)	Leinster	Celtic League	Loss	Nil

== Sponsorship ==
=== Official kit supplier ===
Canterbury - Official kit supplier
