= Ross Doneghan =

Scottish rugby union player & coach

- Born: Ross Doneghan; 8 October 1988 (age 38) Edinburgh, Scotland
- Height: 6 ft 3 in (1.91 m)
- Weight: 98 kg (15 st 6 lb)
- School: Stewart's Melville College
- University: Stirling University
- Notable relative(s): Mike Doneghan, brother

Rugby union career
- Position: Flanker / Hooker
Amateur team(s)
Years	Team	Apps	(Points)
-	Stewart's Melville		
2010-12	Ayr		
2013-14	Darlington Mowden Park		
Senior career
Years	Team	Apps	(Points)
2009-10	Border Bulldogs	-	(-)
2010-11	Rotherham Titans	-	(-)
2011-12	Glasgow Warriors	0	(0)
2014-15	London Scottish	-	(-)
Coaching career
- Years: Team
- 2014–17: London Scottish (Asst. coach)
- 2015-16: Serge Betsen Rugby
- 2015-17: Harlequins (Community coach)
- 2018-19: Ealing Trailfinders (Head of Community)-
- 2019-21: Haringey Rhino Ladies RFC "(Head Ladies Coach)"
- 2019-: Latymer Upper School (Head of Rugby)
- 2021-: Richmond F.C. (Women's Forward Coach)

Ross Doneghan (born 8 October 1988) is a Scottish rugby union coach now with Harlequins and Ealing Trailfinders. He previously played for Glasgow Warriors, London Scottish, Ayr, Stewart's Melville and Border Bulldogs.

== Rugby Union career ==
=== Amateur career ===
Doneghan started playing mini rugby in Linlithgow with the wee reds. He continued his rugby at Stewart's Melville College.

He was part of the Stewart's Melville team that won the Bell Lawrie Scottish Schools Cup of 2006.

From Stewart's Melville he moved to the Rugby Legends Academy in South Africa, run by former Scotland and South Africa international player John Allan.

While with Glasgow Warriors, he played with Ayr from 2011. During this time at Ayr he converted from a Flanker to a Hooker.

He played for Darlington Mowden Park from 2013–14, who at the time played in National League 2 North. That season the Darlington side won promotion to National League 1 for the 2014-15 season. Doneghan played at Hooker for the Darlington side.

=== Professional career ===
In South Africa, Doneghan played for the Border Bulldogs in season 2009-10. He switched between Lock and Flanker for the South African side.

He moved to England to play with the Rotherham Titans in the RFU Championship in the 2010-11 season.

He became part of Glasgow Warriors set-up as a back-up player in the 2011-12 season. He played one match for the Warriors in that season; turning out for the Glasgow club in a pre-season friendly against Newcastle Falcons. The Warriors won the match 17 - 7.

After a successful season with Darlington, Doneghan was signed by London Scottish for 2014-15. His brother Mike Doneghan was playing with Scottish at the time.

=== Coaching career ===
During his time with London Scottish Doneghan migrated to a coaching role. He remained a coach there until 2017.

Doneghan also began coaching with Serge Betsen Rugby for the 2015-16 season.

He became a Community rugby coach for Harlequins in 2015, and was their Schools co-ordinator from 2017 to 2018.

From 2018 to 2019, he was Head of Community coaching for Ealing Trailfinders.

Since 2019, he has been Head of Rugby at Latymer Upper School.

He was also the Head coach at Haringey Rhino Ladies, where they finished the 2019/2020 season undefeated and top of the league, moving up for the coming season. Ross coined the phrase on the team #teamtobeat.

He joined Richmond FC in 2021 as the women’s forwards coach.
