= Chris Fusaro =

Scotland international rugby union player

- Born: Christopher Curtis Fusaro; 21 July 1989 (age 37) Kirkcaldy, Scotland
- Height: 1.81 m (5 ft 11 in)
- Weight: 95 kg (14 st 13 lb; 209 lb)
- School: Bell Baxter High School
- University: Edinburgh University

Rugby union career
- Position: Flanker
Amateur team(s)
Years	Team	Apps	(Points)
-	Howe of Fife		
–	Stirling County		
Senior career
Years	Team	Apps	(Points)
2010– 2021	Glasgow Warriors	183	(40)
- Correct as of 10 March 2017
International career
Years	Team	Apps	(Points)
- Scotland U18
- Scotland U19
2009	Scotland U20	5	(10)
- Scotland 'A'
2014	Scotland	4	(0)
- Correct as of 29 June 2014
National sevens team
Years	Team		Comps
2007–08	Scotland 7s		10
Coaching career
- Years: Team
- 2016-19: Stirling County (Asst.)
- 2019-: Glasgow High Kelvinside (Asst.)

Chris Fusaro (born 21 July 1989 in Kirkcaldy, Scotland) was a Scotland international rugby union player. He played for Glasgow Warriors as a flanker.

== Rugby Union career ==
=== Amateur career ===
Early in 2007 he was among a group of boys who achieved a notable double in playing for two trophy-winning teams at Murrayfield in eight days – Bell Baxter High School beating Dollar Academy 20–8 in the Bell Lawrie Scottish Schools Cup final, and Howe of Fife winning the SRU Youth League final against Musselburgh by 27–14.

He plays for Stirling County when not needed by the Warriors.

=== Professional career ===
Fusaro signed for Glasgow Warriors in summer 2010.

He had to be patient in his first season at Warriors but he burst into the team in season 2011–12 establishing himself as a key component of the Glasgow pack, noted for his aggression and ball-winning ability at openside.

He was voted Glasgow Warriors' 2011–12 Player of the Year by the club's fans (with 40% of the vote), having already been named Players' Player of the Season and the club's Player of the Season. He was rewarded with a contract extension that kept him at the club until the end of May 2014.

He has now made over 100 appearances for the Warriors and is contracted till 2018.

Chris Fusaro retires from professional rugby after 11 years with Glasgow and Scotland May 19, 2021 https://www.thecourier.co.uk/fp/sport/2236918/chris-fusaro-retires-from-professional-rugby-after-11-years-with-glasgow-and-scotland/

=== International career ===
Fusaro won honours at all three Scotland age-grade levels from under-18 to under-20 as well as Scotland 7s and Scotland A squads.

Fusaro represented Scotland A at the IRB Nations Cup in Romania and represented his country at rugby sevens in the 2010 Commonwealth Games in Delhi.

In sevens, he played for the Rugby Ecosse Scotland squad in the Singapore event in October 2007, played for Scotland in the eight tournaments on the 2007–08 IRB Sevens World Series as well as a further two in the edition.

=== Coaching career ===
On 21 July 2016 it was announced that Fusaro would become a backroom coach at Stirling County in addition to his Warriors duties.

He moved to be an Assistant Coach of Glasgow High Kelvinside in 2019.

== Outside of rugby ==
=== Athletics ===
Fusaro was also part of the Bell Baxter 4 × 100 m relay team which won the Scottish Schools Under-17 Championship.

=== Family ===
He is of Scottish and Italian ancestry.
