= Mike Doneghan =

Scottish rugby union player

- Born: Michael Doneghan; 6 May 1991 (age 35) Livingston, Scotland
- Height: 6 ft 3 in (1.91 m)
- Weight: 100 kg (15 st 10 lb)
- School: Stewart's Melville College
- Notable relative(s): Ross Doneghan, brother

Rugby union career
- Position: Centre / Wing
Amateur team(s)
Years	Team	Apps	(Points)
- Stewart's Melville
2010-12	Stirling County		
2015-16	A.S. Macon		
Senior career
Years	Team	Apps	(Points)
2008	Edinburgh	0	(0)
2008	Gloucester	0	(0)
2010-12	Glasgow Warriors	0	(0)
2012-13	Rotherham Titans		
2013-15	London Scottish		
2016-	CSM Baia Mare		
International career
Years	Team	Apps	(Points)
- Scotland U18
–	Scotland U19		
–	Scotland U20		

Mike Doneghan (born 6 May 1991) is a former professional Scottish rugby union player. Recently at centre for CSM Baia Mare in Romania.

== Rugby Union career ==
=== Amateur career ===
Doneghan started with Stewart's Melville. He was part of the team that were runners-up in the Bell Lawrie Scottish Schools Cup of 2009.

While with Glasgow Warriors, he played with Stirling County.

=== Professional career ===
He played for Edinburgh U18s in 2008.

He moved to Gloucester that same year and was named best player in their summer academy.

He was named in Glasgow Warriors academy as an Elite Development Player in 2010. He stayed at Glasgow till 2012. He played one match for Glasgow Warriors; away to Dundee HSFP in a pre-season match of the 2010-11 season.

He moved to play for Rotherham Titans for one season in 2012–13, who played in the English championship at the time.

He moved to play for London Scottish for two seasons from 2013 to 2015.

After playing with London Scottish, Doneghan moved to A.S. Macon in France who were playing in Federale 1 at the time.

In 2016 he moved to play for Romanian side CSM Baia Mare in the CEC Bank Super League, the professional top league of Romania.

=== International career ===
Doneghan came through the age-grades with Scotland; playing for the Scotland U18s, Scotland U19s and Scotland U20s.

He would qualify on residency for the Romania national rugby union team in 2019.

He played an exhibition match for Romania A and hoped to represent the Romanian side in the 2019 Rugby World Cup. However the Romanian team were expelled from the tournament in 2018 for fielding an ineligible player.
