= Dave McCall =

Scottish rugby union player (born 1987)

- Born: Dave McCall; 15 April 1987 (age 39) Scotland
- Height: 5 ft 11 in (1.80 m)
- Weight: 104 kg (16 st 5 lb)

Rugby union career
- Position: Wing
Amateur team(s)
Years	Team	Apps	(Points)
- Stewart's Melville
2008-10	Heriots		
2010-11	Melrose		
2011	Glasgow Hawks		
Senior career
Years	Team	Apps	(Points)
2005-07	Edinburgh	3	(5)
2009-11	Glasgow Warriors	4	(0)
2011-12	Rotherham Titans	17	(10)
2012-13	London Scottish	9	(0)
International career
Years	Team	Apps	(Points)
2005-06	Scotland U19		
- Scotland Club XV
National sevens team
Years	Team		Comps
- Scotland 7s

Dave McCall (born 15 April 1987) is a former Scotland 7s international rugby union player, previously with Glasgow Warriors and Edinburgh.

== Rugby Union career ==
=== Amateur career ===
He started with Stewart's Melville, where he impressed, becoming an apprentice at Edinburgh Rugby.

He played for Heriots while at Edinburgh University. He won Man of the Match in the Scottish Cup final of 2007 in Heriots match against Melrose. In his first season with Glasgow Warriors he was also assigned to Heriots in the Pro Player Draft.

In 2010-11 season he was assigned to Melrose in the draft.

At the start of 2011-12 season he was assigned to Glasgow Hawks. However by the end of 2011, he had moved to England.

=== Professional career ===
He played for Edinburgh from 2005 to 2007. When Edinburgh was taken from the Bob Carruthers run franchise back into the SRU's hands McCall was released in a cost-cutting measure.

On the back of his Scottish Cup final performance for Heriots Glasgow Warriors boss Sean Lineen offered McCall a training contract. He played for Glasgow Warriors from 2009 to 2011, making his contract full time in 2010. He has the Warrior No. 176.

He moved to Rotherham at the end of 2011 and played for Rotherham Titans from 2011 to 2012.

He played for London Scottish from 2012 to 2013.

=== International career ===
He was capped by Scotland U19s.

He was also capped by Scotland Club XV.

He has been capped by Scotland 7s.
