= Duncan Weir =

Scotland international rugby union player

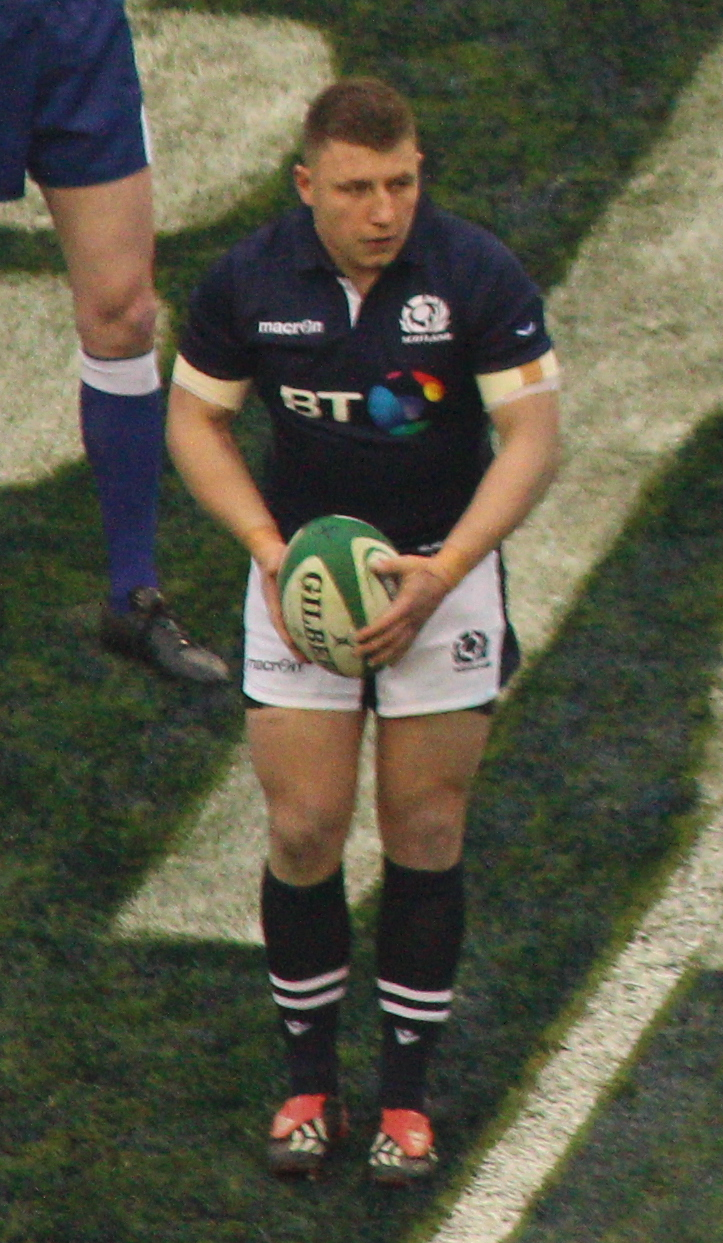
- Weir in 2016
- Born: Duncan Weir; 10 May 1991 (age 35) Rutherglen, Scotland
- Height: 1.72 m (5 ft 8 in)
- Weight: 92.8 kg (14 st 9 lb)
- School: Cathkin High School
- University: Cumbernauld College

Rugby union career
- Position: Fly-half
Amateur team(s)
Years	Team	Apps	(Points)
- Cambuslang
2010–12	Glasgow Hawks		
2012–13	Aberdeen GSFP		
2013–14	Stirling County		
2014–16	Currie		
2016–17	Hawick		
2017–18	Boroughmuir		
Senior career
Years	Team	Apps	(Points)
2010–16	Glasgow Warriors	108	(765)
2016–18	Edinburgh Rugby	34	(231)
2018–21	Worcester Warriors	22	(204)
2021–26	Glasgow Warriors	55	(202)
International career
Years	Team	Apps	(Points)
2012–2026	Scotland	30	(80)
Coaching career
- Years: Team
- 2026-: Glasgow Warriors (Academy)
- 2026-: Scotland U20 (Asst.)

12th Sir Willie Purves Quaich
- In office 2011–2011
- Preceded by: Alex Blair
- Succeeded by: David Denton

Duncan Weir (born 10 May 1991) is a former Scotland international rugby union rugby player and now coach. He coaches at the Glasgow Warriors academy. He most recently played professional rugby for United Rugby Championship side Glasgow Warriors at fly-half. He previously played for Edinburgh and Worcester Warriors.

== Rugby Union career ==
=== Amateur career ===
Weir was educated at Cathkin High School. He played for Cambuslang RFC.

Weir was drafted to Glasgow Hawks for the 2010–11 and 2011-12 seasons. Drafting meant he could play for an amateur side when not used by his professional club.

Weir was drafted to Aberdeen GSFP for the 2012-13 season; and Stirling County for the 2013-14 season. In the 2014-15 season, Weir was drafted to Currie; at the time Currie - an Edinburgh club - was nominally under Glasgow Warriors' purview.

Weir's move to Edinburgh Rugby meant that he was then drafted to amateur clubs under Edinburgh's purview instead. So Weir was drafted to Hawick in 2016-17; and then Boroughmuir for season 2017-18.

=== Professional career ===
Weir made his professional competitive debut for Glasgow Warriors on 23 April 2010 against Leinster Rugby at Firhill Stadium in the Celtic League, becoming Glasgow Warrior No. 181.

In March 2014, Weir signed a new two-year contract with Glasgow Warriors. He won the Pro12 title with Glasgow in season 2014-15.

On 24 January 2016, Weir left Glasgow to join 1872 Cup rivals Edinburgh on a two-year deal from the 2016-17 season.

After racking up 221 points in 30 games during his time at BT Murrayfield Stadium, he left Edinburgh to join English side Worcester Warriors in the Premiership Rugby on a one-year deal. Weir continued to perform at Worcester and in December 2018, he signed a new two-year extension with the club.

On 13 January 2021, Weir returned home to Scotland to re-join Glasgow Warriors which started his professional career ahead of the 2021-22 season.

He ended his professional playing career on 3 January 2026, playing for Glasgow Warriors against Zebre in the United Rugby Championship. In a seven try win over the Italian side, Weir scored a try and three conversions, coming off the bench and winning the man of the match, dislocating his finger and tearing his hamstring in the process.

At the time of his retirement he was the first and only Glasgow Warrior to play in two championship winning sides for the club, and was the club's third highest points scorer. He played 163 times for the Glasgow side, scoring 967 points in the process.

=== International career ===
Weir was reserve Fly-Half for Scotland's 2013 Six Nations campaign but with Scotland failing to score tries, Weir's Glasgow teammate Ruaridh Jackson was dropped and Weir stepped in. He started Scotland's final two games in the Championship which Scotland finished in third place.

Weir was starting fly-half for Scotland's 2014 Six Nations having impressed in Glasgow's successful season. He scored a last minute drop-goal to beat Italy in Rome for the first time since 2006.

Weir received a call-up to the Scotland squad for the 2017 Six Nations Championship.

Weir was called up to Scotland’s extended Six Nations squad in 2019 after an outstanding first season with Worcester Warriors. His consistent form coupled with Scotland’s decision to suspend Finn Russell for a breach of team protocols led to another recall ahead of the 2020 Six Nations.

=== Coaching career ===
In 2026, Duncan Weir was announced as a new Glasgow Warriors academy coach along with Shade Munro and Nick Ryan. Weir said "We want to graduate as many of our academy players to the pro game as possible – that’s my goal in the new position, and seeing young backs go from the academy to long and decorated careers for Glasgow Warriors and Scotland would be something that would fill me with great pride."

He was appointed an Assistant Coach to Scotland U20s in 2026.
