= Aly Muldowney =

English rugby union footballer

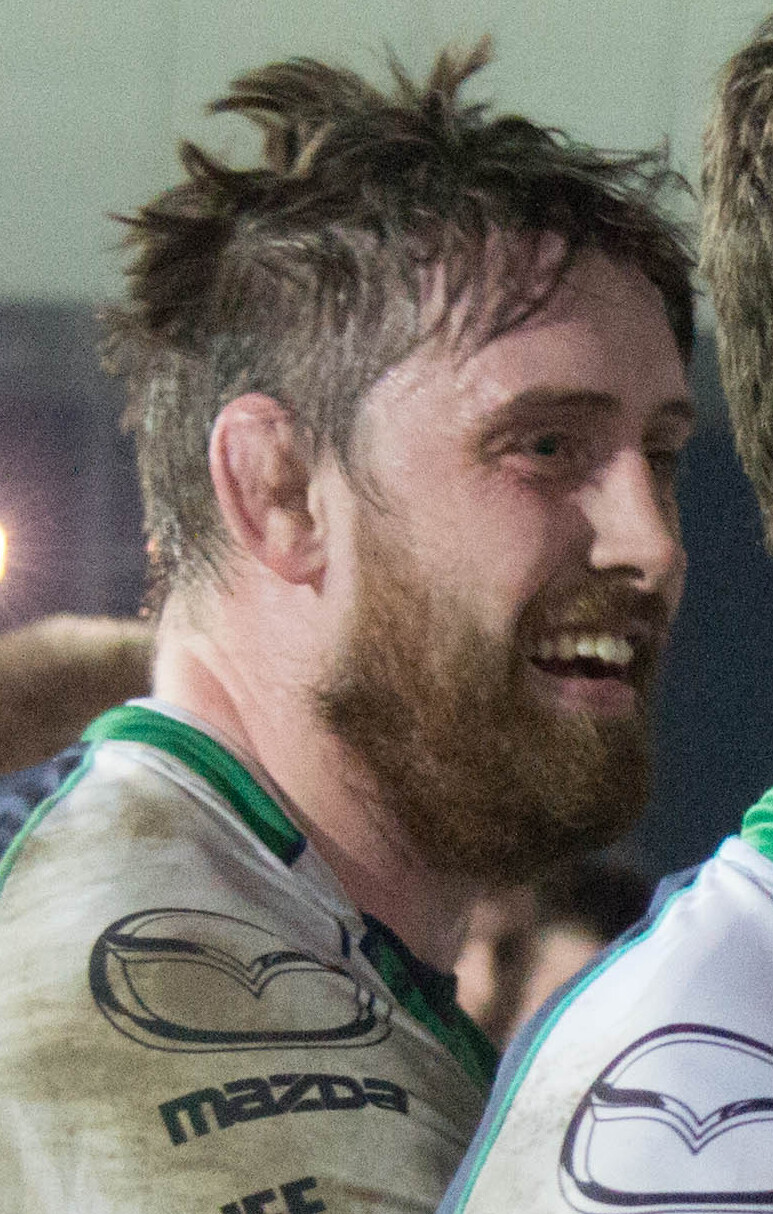
- Born: Alastair William Muldowney; 3 August 1983 (age 43) Stafford, England
- Height: 1.96 m (6 ft 5 in)
- Weight: 122 kg (19.2 st)

Rugby union career
- Position: Lock
- Current team: Bristol Bears
Amateur team(s)
Years	Team	Apps	(Points)
2004–2008	Stafford RFC		
–	Stourbridge		
Senior career
Years	Team	Apps	(Points)
2008–2010	Moseley		
2010–2011	Glasgow	24	(10)
2011–2013	Exeter Chiefs	50	(15)
2013–2016	Connacht	83	(35)
2016–2018	Grenoble	34	(5)
2018-2020	Bristol Bears	14	(0)
- Correct as of 02 May 2018

Alastair William "Aly" Muldowney (born 3 August 1983) is an English-born professional rugby union player. He is a versatile forward, being able to play in both the second row and as a flanker. Muldowney currently plays for Gallagher Premiership club Bristol Bears.

== Club career ==
=== Early career ===
Muldowney was a late starter in rugby, opting to play basketball and football at a young age instead. His first rugby club was Stafford RFC and his second club was Stourbridge, playing in the National League 1. From there Muldowney was signed by RFU Championship side Moseley. Following his spell at Moseley he was scouted by Scottish club Glasgow Warriors.

=== Glasgow Warriors ===
Muldowney played his first game for Glasgow on 3 September 2010 in a 2010–11 Celtic League match with Leinster. He made his European debut for the team in the 2010–11 Heineken Cup game with Toulouse on 10 December that year, and played in another three of the team's pool games. Muldowney played a total of 20 Celtic League games for the side, scoring tries against Newport Gwent Dragons and Benetton Treviso. He played his final game for Warriors on 6 May 2011 against Leinster.

Muldowney left Glasgow at the end of the 2010–11 season. He joined Premiership club Exeter Chiefs.

=== Exeter Chiefs ===
Muldowney made his debut for the Chiefs on 10 September 2011, coming off the bench against Newcastle Falcons. Muldowney played in 17 Premiership games that season, 11 of these appearances coming from the bench, and scored one try as Exeter finished 5th. Muldowney also played in the 2011–12 European Challenge Cup for the Chiefs, starting three games and coming on as a replacement in a further three, including the quarter-final against Stade Français, and scored a try against I Cavalieri Prato in the pool stages. Muldowney also came on from the bench in three of the team's four games in 2011–12 LV Cup.

In his second season, Muldowney played 18 games in the Premiership, starting in five of them. He scored a try in the first game of the season against Sale Sharks. Muldowney played in only one game in the 2012–13 LV Cup, a 28–19 victory over the Northampton Saints on 2 February 2013. In the Heineken Cup, Muldowney played in five of the team's pool games, starting in the 30–20 win at home to Scarlets, as the Chiefs finished third and were eliminated from the competition. Muldowney played his final match for Exeter on 4 May 2013 against Gloucester.

=== Connacht ===
In January 2013 it was announced that Muldowney would be joining Pro12 side Connacht on a three-year contract at the end of the 2012–13 season. Muldowney played his first game for Connacht on 7 September 2013 against Zebre in the 2013–14 Pro12. He made his first European appearance for Connacht on 11 October that year, coming off the bench against Saracens in the 2013–14 Heineken Cup. Muldowney was primarily used as a substitute in his first season, making 20 league appearances, 11 of them from the bench, and was a replacement in both of his Heineken Cup games for the province.

Ahead of the 2014–15 campaign Connacht's captain, second row Craig Clarke, retired which meant Muldowney featured more prominently throughout the season. He played in four of Connacht's five Challenge Cup, including two games against his former team Exeter Chiefs, and played in the quarter-final against Gloucester. Muldowney also made 18 appearances in the 2014–15 Pro12, and though this was a lower total than the previous season, he started 15 of these games and scored three tries. Muldowney also played the full match and extra time in Connacht's final match of the season, a play-off with Gloucester to enter the following season's Champions Cup. Muldowney's contributions were recognised with a Connacht Player of the Month award for February 2015 and being named by the rest of the squad as the province's "Team Man of the Year."

On 31 October 2015 Muldowney made his 50th appearance for Connacht in a 2014–15 Pro12 game against Edinburgh. On 28 May 2016, Muldowney made his final appearance for Connacht winning the Pro12 for the club's first time.

=== Grenoble ===
Muldowney moved to French club Grenoble from the 2016-17 season in the Top 14.

=== Bristol Rugby ===
In January 2018, Muldowney was announced as having signed for then-Greene King IPA Championship outfit Bristol for the 2018-19 season.

== International ==
Muldowney is qualified to play for England, Scotland or Ireland internationally. Born in England, he qualifies for Ireland through his father who was born in Newbridge. Muldowney came close to playing for Scotland A national rugby union team in 2011, which would have exempted him from playing for Ireland or England, but was ruled out of the squad with a shoulder injury.
