= Federico Martín Aramburú =

Argentine rugby union player (1980–2022)

- Born: 20 January 1980 La Plata, Buenos Aires, Argentina
- Died: 19 March 2022 (aged 42) Paris, France
- Height: 1.83 m (6 ft 0 in)
- Weight: 86 kg (13.5 st; 190 lb)

Rugby union career
- Position(s): Wing, Centre
Amateur team(s)
Years	Team	Apps	(Points)
- CASI
Senior career
Years	Team	Apps	(Points)
2004–2006	Biarritz	52	(40)
2006–2008	Perpignan	21	(5)
2008–2010	Dax	43	(30)
2010–2011	Glasgow Warriors	32	(20)
2011–2012	CASI	7	(10)
International career
Years	Team	Apps	(Points)
2004–2009	Argentina	22	(40)
National sevens team
Years	Team		Comps
2002–2005	Argentina		11

Federico Martín Aramburú (Spanish pronunciation: [feðeˈɾiko maɾˈtin aɾambuˈɾu]; 20 January 1980 – 19 March 2022) was an Argentine rugby union player.

== Rugby career ==
=== Club career ===
Aramburú was born in La Plata, Buenos Aires Province, into a family of Basque, French, Genoese, and Catalan ancestry. He was the great-great-grandson of the French-Argentine naval officer Julio Fonrouge, who fought in the Cisplatine War and the Argentine Civil Wars, and was a second cousin of Ferdinand de Lesseps.

He began his rugby career in Argentina playing for the amateur club Club Atlético San Isidro (CASI). He subsequently moved to France, where he spent much of his early professional career playing for Biarritz Olympique, USA Perpignan, and US Dax.

In the summer of 2010, Aramburú signed with the Scottish team Glasgow Warriors to play in the Pro12. In doing so, he joined his fellow Argentine international Bernardo Stortoni, who was the first-choice full-back at the club at the time.

=== International career ===
Aramburú made his international debut for the Argentina national team in April 2004 in a match against Chile. A versatile back, he primarily played as a wing and centre. Throughout his international career, Aramburú earned 22 caps (17 starts and 5 appearances as a substitute) and scored eight tries.

He was selected for the Argentina squad at the 2007 Rugby World Cup in France, where he scored a try in the team's pool-stage victory against Georgia. Of his 17 international starts for the Pumas, six were at outside centre, three at inside centre, and four on each wing.

== Death ==
In the early hours of 19 March 2022, Aramburú was shot dead in Paris at the age of 42, shortly after an altercation at the bar Le Mabillon in the 6th arrondissement. According to multiple eyewitness accounts reported in the press, the confrontation began when a homeless man of colour asked Aramburú's group for a cigarette, prompting two other customers to launch a racist tirade and call the man "subhuman"; Aramburú and a former teammate intervened and asked them to be more respectful, before physically escalating the altercation by attacking one of the customers. Bar staff separated the groups and Aramburú left the premises, but a short time later a car drove up to him and his friend on Boulevard Saint-Germain and at least two shooters exited the vehicle and fired several shots, hitting Aramburú four times in the back and killing him at the scene.

French authorities quickly opened a murder investigation, later re-characterised as a case of assassinat (murder with premeditation). Two French nationals, Loïk Le Priol and Romain Bouvier, were arrested in Hungary and western France and placed under formal investigation for "assassination", as well as aggravated violence and weapons offences, while Le Priol's partner was charged with complicity for driving the car used in the attack. Prosecutors and major French media outlets described Le Priol and Bouvier as far-right or ultra-right activists and former members of the Groupe union défense (GUD), a violent far-right student organisation, and the Paris prosecutor's office has requested that they be tried for having "voluntarily caused the death of Federico Martin Aramburú by firing several projectiles with a firearm, at vital areas and from behind, with premeditation". Commentators, anti-racist organisations and parts of the rugby community have therefore referred to Aramburú's killing as a far-right political assassination, stressing that he was targeted after intervening against a racist attack.

In September 2026 Le Priol and Bouvier were found guilty of Aramburú's murder and were sentenced to 26 and 19 years in jail respectively.

== Honours ==
=== Biarritz Olympique ===
- Top 14: 2004–05, 2005–06
