= Tom Ryder (rugby union) =

Scotland international rugby union footballer

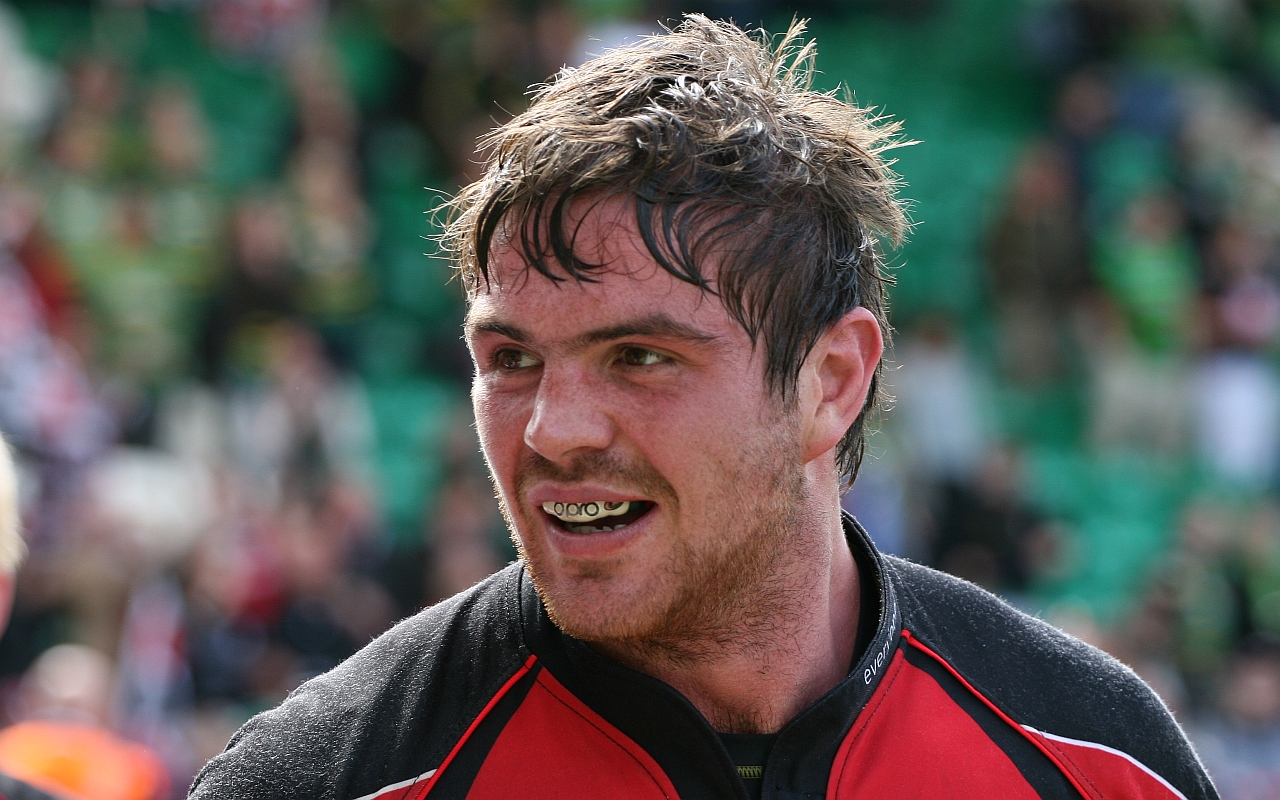
- Born: Thomas P. Ryder; 21 February 1985 (age 41) Nottingham, England
- Height: 6 ft 5 in (1.96 m)
- Weight: 111 kg (17 st 7 lb)
- School: Southwell Minster School; Uppingham School
- University: University of Hertfordshire

Rugby union career
- Position: Lock
- Current team: Yorkshire Carnegie
Youth career
- 1992–2001: Newark R.U.F.C.
Senior career
| Years | Team | Apps | (Points) |
| 2001–2005 | Leicester Tigers | 3 | (0) |
| 2005–2011 | Saracens | 98 | (5) |
| 2010 | → Glasgow Warriors | 8 | (0) |
| 2011–2015 | Glasgow Warriors | 81 | (10) |
| 2015 | Northampton Saints | 2 | (0) |
| 2015–2016 | Yorkshire Carnegie | 15 | (5) |
- Correct as of 19 May 2013
Provincial / State sides
| Years | Team | Apps | (Points) |
| 2008 | Taranaki | 6 | (5) |
- Correct as of 24 October 2012
International career
| Years | Team | Apps | (Points) |
| 2001–2002 | England U16 | | |
| 2002–2003 | England U18 | | |
| 2003–2004 | England U19 | | |
| 2005–2006 | England U21 | | |
| 2010 | Scotland A | 1 | (0) |
| 2012 | Scotland | 2 | (0) |
- Correct as of 24 October 2012

Thomas P. Ryder (born 21 February 1985) is a former rugby union player who played at lock, latterly for Yorkshire Carnegie in the RFU Championship.

== Early life ==
Ryder was born in Nottingham, England on 21 February 1985 and educated at Southwell Minster School and Uppingham School. He began playing rugby at the age of seven at Newark R.U.F.C. before joining Leicester Tigers Academy system at the age of 16, having captained England's under-16 side.

== Club career ==
Ryder made three appearances in the Zurich Premiership for Leicester Tigers. During his time with the club, Ryder captained England at Under 19 level. Ryder left the Tigers to join Saracens in the summer of 2005.

Ryder broke into Saracens first team towards the end of the 2005–06 season and became a regular. During the opening months of the 2008–09 season, Ryder played for Taranaki in the 2008 Air New Zealand Cup.

During the opening months of the 2010–11 season Ryder went on loan to injury hit Glasgow Warriors returning to Sarries at the start of November 2010. Ryder signed a two-year contract with Glasgow for the 2011–12 season.

Ryder's best season with Glasgow was in 2011/12, when he was voted into the Pro12 Dream Team. Ryder left Glasgow in January 2015 to play for Northampton until the end of the 2014/15 season.

On 1 May 2015, Ryder signed for Yorkshire Carnegie who were competing in the RFU Championship in the 2015–16 season.

Ryder retired from professional rugby in May 2016, noting that injuries in latter years had made it impossible to recapture his peak form.

== International career ==
Ryder has captained England at under-16 and under-19 levels, as well as playing at under-18. He represented England at the 2006 Under-21 World Championship. Ryder switched his allegiance and made his debut for Scotland A against the USA in November 2010, qualifying through his Glasgow born father, He made his debut for Scotland during their 2012 summer-test series against both Fiji and Samoa.
