= Ed Kalman =

Scotland international rugby union player

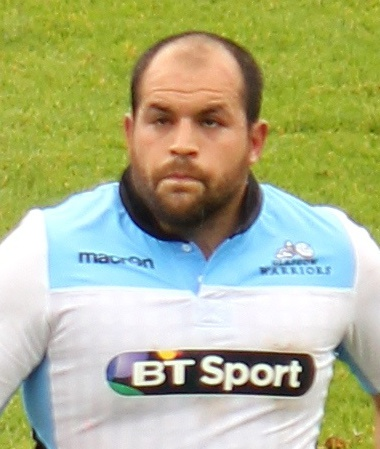
- Born: Ed Kalman; 7 December 1982 (age 43) Plymouth, England
- Height: 1.88 m (6 ft 2 in)
- Weight: 121 kg (19 st 1 lb)
- School: Belmont House School
- University: Durham University; Fitzwilliam College, Cambridge

Rugby union career
- Position: Tighthead Prop
Amateur team(s)
Years	Team	Apps	(Points)
- Whitecraigs RFC
- Durham University RFC
2005	Cambridge University R.U.F.C.		
2008–09	Boroughmuir		
2009–14	Ayr RFC		
2013	Stirling County RFC		
Senior career
Years	Team	Apps	(Points)
- Newcastle Falcons
2005	→ Yorkshire Carnegie	1	
2006–2007	Border Reivers	21	(10)
2007–2014	Glasgow Warriors	101	(15)
- Correct as of 19 May 2013
Provincial / State sides
Years	Team	Apps	(Points)
2000–2002	Glasgow District		
2009	Gael Force		
International career
Years	Team	Apps	(Points)
2006–2010	Scotland A	12	
2012	Scotland	2	(0)
- Correct as of 22 August 2015
Coaching career
- Years: Team
- 2014–: Strathallan School

Ed Kalman (born 7 December 1982) is a former Scottish rugby union internationalist, who played for Glasgow Warriors in the Pro12. He played as a prop; both at tighthead and loosehead.

== Rugby Union career ==
=== Amateur career ===
Having moved to Scotland from an early age, Kalman went to Belmont House School in Newton Mearns, East Renfrewshire. He joined the local rugby club Whitecraigs RFC. He played for the Glasgow District team for their under-20s from 2000–2002.

Kalman studied Physics at Durham University. He was a member of the Durham University rugby side that won the 2004 BUSA final at Twickenham.

From the north-east he then moved to Cambridge University. He was at tight head in the Cambridge University R.U.F.C. team who beat Oxford in the 2005 University match at Twickenham.

He played in a Gael Force team formed by the SRU to play in the British and Irish Cup.

=== Professional career ===
In the north-east of England he was signed by Newcastle Falcons academy. He played one loan game for Yorkshire Carnegie, then as Leeds Tykes.

He joined the Border Reivers in summer 2006 and his competition debut for Reivers was a replacement against Connacht at Netherdale on the opening day of the 2006–07 Magners League, and he had his first start the following month in the victory against another Irish province, Leinster, also at Netherdale. His first Reivers try was in the Heineken Cup victory against Overmach Parma at Netherdale in October 2006.

Ed Kalman joined Glasgow Warriors from the Reivers after the closure of the Borders pro-team in 2007.

The prop signed a new deal with the Warriors in 2011. He retired from playing rugby union at the end of season 2013–14 due to a back injury.

=== International career ===
Ed made his first appearance in a national context as a replacement for Scotland A against their Australian counterparts at McDiarmid Park, Perth, in November 2006. He also had a replacement role in the A international victory against Italy on the same ground three months later.

In January 2012, he was called up to Scotland's senior squad for the 2012 Six Nations Championship.

== Teaching career ==
With his physics background at Durham University, he became a physics teacher and given his rugby background, the first team rugby coach; to Strathallan School, Perthshire in 2014
