= Henry Pyrgos =

Scotland international rugby union player

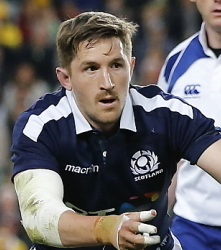
- Pyrgos in 2017
- Born: Henry Benjamin Pyrgos; 9 July 1989 (age 37) Dorchester, Dorset, England
- Height: 1.78 m (5 ft 10 in)
- Weight: 80 kg (12 st 8 lb; 176 lb)
- School: Giffnock Primary School; Bryanston School
- University: Loughborough University

Rugby union career
- Position: Scrum-Half
Amateur team(s)
Years	Team	Apps	(Points)
2017-18	Stirling County		
Senior career
Years	Team	Apps	(Points)
2010–2018	Glasgow Warriors	147	(114)
2018–2023	Edinburgh Rugby	84	(30)
International career
Years	Team	Apps	(Points)
2009	Scotland U20	10	(5)
2012–2019	Scotland	29	(29)
Coaching career
- Years: Team
- 2023-2025: Boroughmuir (Ass. Coach)
- 2025-: Edinburgh University

Henry Benjamin Pyrgos (born 9 July 1989) is a former Scotland international rugby union player and now coach. He is currently the head coach at Edinburgh University RFC, having previously been an assistant coach at Boroughmuir. He previously played for Edinburgh Rugby in the United Rugby Championship; and is a centurion for Glasgow Warriors, winning the Pro12 title with the club in 2015. He also works in finance at LGT Wealth Management.

== Rugby Union career ==
=== Amateur career ===
Pyrgos was drafted to Stirling County in the Scottish Premiership for the 2017-18 season.

=== Professional career ===
Pyrgos played for Glasgow Warriors in the Pro14, making his first cap for the club in 2010, becoming Glasgow Warrior No. 184. He won the Pro12 title with the club in 2014-15. He was made co-captain of the side (with Jonny Gray) for the season 2016-17. The co-captaincy was scrapped by new head coach Dave Rennie for the 2017-18 season, though the scrum-half remained in the Warriors' leadership group. He played 147 matches for the Warriors before leaving the club at the end of season.

In July 2018 it was confirmed that Pyrgos would be moving to rival team Edinburgh Rugby for the prospect of more frequent game time.

=== International career ===
Pyrgos has represented both Scotland Under 20 and Scotland A.

On 24 October 2012 Pyrgos was named in the full Scottish national team for the 2012 end-of-year rugby union tests.

On 6 November 2012, Pyrgos was announced as a substitute for the Scotland versus New Zealand match, the first of the end-of-year test series, and made his debut around a week later when he was brought on in the final five minutes of the match. The final score was 22–51.

Pyrgos's second cap appearance on 17 November was against South Africa at Murrayfield when he scored his first international try, however Scotland lost with a final score of 10–21. His third cap appearance was against Tonga on 24 November where he made the starting line up. This game was played in Pittodrie in Aberdeen and Scotland lost 15–21.

=== Coaching career ===
On 16 July 2023 it was announced that Pyrgos would become an assistant coach at Boroughmuir.

On 12 August 2025 it was announced on the Edinburgh University RFC Instagram Account that Pyrgos would become the head coach at Edinburgh University RFC, with Sam Skinner appointed assistant coach (forwards).

== Business career ==
Pyrgos is starting a new career in finance and investment, alongside rugby coaching. He is a Business Development Manager at LGT Wealth Management.
