= Alastair Kellock =

Scotland international rugby union player

- Born: Alastair David Kellock; 14 June 1981 (age 45) Bishopbriggs, East Dunbartonshire, Scotland
- Height: 2.03 m (6 ft 8 in)
- Weight: 118 kg (18 st 8 lb)
- School: Bishopbriggs High School

Rugby union career
- Position: Lock
Amateur team(s)
Years	Team	Apps	(Points)
- Allan Glen's
Senior career
Years	Team	Apps	(Points)
2002–2006	Edinburgh	56	(15)
2006–2015	Glasgow Warriors	158	(20)
- Correct as of 5 November 2013
International career
Years	Team	Apps	(Points)
2004–2013	Scotland	56	(5)
- Correct as of 13 November 2013

Alastair David Kellock (born 14 June 1981) is Head of Performance Pathways at the SRU. He was previously the managing director at Glasgow Warriors. He is a former Scotland international rugby union player. He played as a lock for Edinburgh Rugby and Glasgow Warriors, captaining the Warriors to a Pro12 league win in 2015.

== Rugby Union career ==
=== Amateur career ===
Kellock began playing rugby union with Allan Glen's in Bishopbriggs.

=== Professional career ===
He played for Edinburgh Rugby before making the switch to Glasgow Warriors.

He captained Glasgow from 2006 until 2015. In his last season 2014–15 before retiring, the Warriors won the Pro12, the first major trophy a Scottish side has won in the professional era. He was named to the Pro12 Dream Team at the end of the 2009/10 and 2012/13 seasons.

=== International career ===
He made his Scotland debut against Australia on 6 November 2004. He captained Scotland to a historic win against Australia in November 2009.

On 25 January 2011, it was announced that Kellock would captain Scotland in the 2011 Six Nations Championship. Kellock scored his first international try against France in Scotland's opening match of the 2011 RBS Six Nations. Kellock also captained his country at the 2011 Rugby World Cup in New Zealand.

His last game for Scotland was in the 42–17 win over Japan in the 2013 end-of-year rugby union internationals.

He was named as part of the November 2014 Barbarian's squad, captaining them in their match against Australia.

=== Administrative career ===
On retiring from playing rugby he took up a commercial post with the Scottish Rugby Union.

On 10 March 2021 it was announced that Kellock would take up the post of managing director with Glasgow Warriors in April 2021. He takes over from Nathan Bombrys who moves to the Scottish Rugby Union as Head of International Commercial Projects. Kellock said of the move: "Glasgow Warriors has been a significant part of my life so far and I am incredibly honoured to have been asked to return as Managing Director. We have an incredibly passionate group of supporters, active and strong partners and an on and off field team who all want to drive the club forward. I am excited about adding to that journey."

He left the Warriors to become the Head of Performance Pathways at the SRU in September 2025.

== Personal life ==
He is the son of Stuart and Jane Kellock. His wife is Ashley and as of 2009 they have a daughter, Kate, and a son, Ruairidh.
