= Murray McConnell =

Scottish rugby union player (born 1992)

- Born: Murray McConnell; 16 November 1992 (age 33) Scotland
- Height: 5 ft 9 in (1.75 m)
- Weight: 12 st 13 lb (82 kg)
- School: Lenzie Academy
- University: Glasgow Caledonian

Rugby union career
- Position: Scrum-half
Amateur team(s)
Years	Team	Apps	(Points)
- West of Scotland
2010–2015	Ayr RFC		
Senior career
Years	Team	Apps	(Points)
2010–2015	Glasgow Warriors	5	
2015–	Nottingham Rugby	45	
- Correct as of 27 June 2015
International career
Years	Team	Apps	(Points)
- Scotland U20
2013	Scotland Club XV		
- Correct as of 27 June 2015

Murray McConnell (born 16 November 1992) is a former Scotland Club XV international and Nottingham Rugby rugby union player who plays at the scrum-half position.

== Rugby Union career ==
=== Amateur career ===
McConnell played for West of Scotland before being noticed by Glasgow Warriors and joined the Warriors as an Elite Development Player in 2010. He was assigned to Ayr Rugby Club to aid his development. He was voted Ayr's 1st XV player of the year in season 2013–14, securing 30 points that season in scoring six tries.

=== Professional career ===
He played in two pre-season friendly matches for the Warriors in 2010 against Dundee HSFP and Sale Sharks.

His first competitive match for the Warriors came in an away game to Scarlets in January 2012 as a substitute.

In the 2014–15 season McConnell graduated from the EDP ranks and secured a one-year partnership professional contract with Glasgow Warriors. This again allowed him to play for Ayr Rugby Club when free from Warriors duty.

He played in a Glasgow Warriors A side against an Edinburgh Rugby A side on 22 September 2014 in a match in Stirling. He was used as a substitute in the Warriors' Pro12 matches at home against Connacht on 26 September and against Treviso on 31 October 2014.

McConnell secured his first competitive start for Glasgow Warriors on 28 February 2015 when he started at scrum-half away to Munster at Thomond Park.

On 7 May 2015 it was announced that McConnell would sign for Nottingham Rugby at the end of the 2014–15 season.

=== International career ===
He was part of the Six Nations Under 20s Championship international squad in 2012 and captained the Scotland team against the English Counties that same year. He was capped by the Scotland Club XV side.

=== Coaching career ===
McConnell is currently the head coach on Long Eaton RFC in RFU Midlands 1 East North Division.
