= 1872 Cup =

Rugby union tournament

- Organiser(s): SRU
- Founded: 2007; 19 years ago
- Region: Glasgow; Edinburgh
- Teams: 2
- Current champions: Glasgow Warriors (2025)
- Most championships: Glasgow Warriors (12 titles)

The 1872 Cup – also known as the 1872 Challenge Cup – is a men's rugby union tournament contested every year between the two Scottish professional clubs, Glasgow Warriors and Edinburgh Rugby.

Under the current format, Glasgow Warriors and Edinburgh Rugby play home-and-away league matches against one another within the United Rugby Championship in which both sides compete. The results in these matches is used to decide the Cup winners. The aggregate score in the home and away ties decides the 1872 Champions each year and bonus points won within the URC league structure are disregarded.

Not only is the Glasgow – Edinburgh fixture the oldest inter-district rugby match in the world, but the derby is classed as one of the biggest in world rugby. Former Edinburgh coach, the South African Alan Solomons states: "These games are massive. For me, this is one of the big derbies of world rugby." Glasgow Warriors head coach Franco Smith said: "It's a very special derby that is world renowned." The matches, often held over the Christmas and New Year holiday season, attract bumper attendances in larger stadia than the teams use habitually.

Not all Glasgow Warriors versus Edinburgh Rugby fixtures are deemed 1872 Cup matches. Should the sides play more matches against one another in a season than the nominated 1872 Cup matches, these other derby matches have no bearing on the 1872 Cup. For example, the Pro14 match of 28 August 2020 in the 2019–20 season between the clubs was the pair's fourth fixture together that season. The 1872 Cup was already decided in the derby fixture the week before, and the 28 August 2020 match was a normal Pro14 league match. Similarly the Glasgow Warriors versus Edinburgh Rugby fixture of 15 May 2021 was a normal Pro14 Rainbow Cup match, the 1872 Cup for that season decided in the Rainbow Cup match in the previous week.

== History ==
The 1872 Cup marks the history of the world's oldest representative match. On 23 November 1872 a Glasgow District side met an Edinburgh District side at Burnbank Park, the home ground of 1st Lanarkshire Rifle Volunteers RFC and at the time also leased for use by Glasgow Academicals. Rugby Union was 20 a side in those days. Edinburgh won the first match. However, there was no cup to be won – and no cup was won until 1995.

=== District sides ===
Scotland had four district sides: North and Midlands; South; Glasgow District and Edinburgh District. These sides regularly played each other and a Scottish Inter-District Championship was introduced in 1953. A Scottish Exiles side was also introduced in the later McEwans District Championship.

=== Professionalism and the Inter-City Cup ===
The 4 District Sides North and Midlands, South, Glasgow and Edinburgh were to become Caledonia Reds, Border Reivers, Glasgow Warriors and Edinburgh Rugby with professionalism. These teams challenged in the Inter-District Championship for European qualification to the Heineken Cup. A cup was offered by the sponsors, the estate agents Slater, Hogg and Howison, in 1995. In 1997–98 the competition received a new sponsor - Inter-City Trains – and the Cup became known as the Inter-City Cup.

When Caledonia Reds and Border Reivers were merged into the Glasgow and Edinburgh sides, Glasgow and Edinburgh played one-off matches for the Inter-City Cup from 1998 to 2002. The Cup became the Virgin Trains Cup with sponsorship in 2001–02 with the Welsh-Scottish League matches between the pair being used to determine the winner.

When the Border Reivers were revived in 2002 the Inter-City Cup was forgotten about and it sat in the old Glasgow & District Rugby Union office in Somerset Place, Glasgow for a few years. Unfortunately the Reivers folded again in 2007.

== 1872 Cup begins ==
The Cup was revived and rebranded by Glasgow Warriors and Edinburgh Rugby as the 1872 Cup in season 2007–08, 1872 being the date of the oldest derby match in rugby union, between the Glasgow and Edinburgh amateur district sides on which the professional clubs were founded.

== Format of the Challenge Cup ==
From 2006 to 2017 the two league encounters of the Celtic League or the Pro12 were used to decide the winner of the 1872 Challenge Cup. Usually, these fixtures were scheduled as double-headers—home/away one week and away/home the next—and often scheduled around the weekends of Christmas and New Year.

From 2017 to 2021 the format of the 1872 Cup was deemed a best-of-three format using Pro14 or Pro14 Rainbow Cup matches.

In 2021, with the advent of the United Rugby Championship, Glasgow Warriors and Edinburgh Rugby reverted to the traditional two league fixtures for the 1872 Cup.

The aggregate score of Glasgow Warriors and Edinburgh Rugby in the fixtures is taken into account in deciding the winner. Where the aggregate score is tied the holder retains the trophy.

== List of results ==
=== Two-match format (2007–08 to 2016–17) ===
When the first Glasgow - Edinburgh derbies were played in 1872 onwards, these were twice a season fixtures (for the first 4 seasons). It was decided that a 2 match format would then decide the 1872 Cup.

Ed.	Year	Date	Venue	Home	Score	Away	Trophy winner Agg.
1	2007–08	28 December 2007	Murrayfield Stadium, Edinburgh	Edinburgh	35–31	Glasgow Warriors	Glasgow Warriors (1); 54–49
1	2007–08	11 April 2008	Firhill Stadium, Glasgow	Glasgow Warriors	23–14	Edinburgh	Glasgow Warriors (1); 54–49
2	2008–09	26 December 2008	Murrayfield Stadium, Edinburgh	Edinburgh	39–6	Glasgow Warriors	Edinburgh (1); 59–31
2	2008–09	2 January 2009	Firhill Stadium, Glasgow	Glasgow Warriors	25–20	Edinburgh	Edinburgh (1); 59–31
3	2009–10	27 December 2009	Firhill Stadium, Glasgow	Glasgow Warriors	25–12	Edinburgh	Glasgow Warriors (2); 47–27
3	2009–10	2 January 2010	Murrayfield Stadium, Edinburgh	Edinburgh	15–22	Glasgow Warriors	Glasgow Warriors (2); 47–27
4	2010–11	27 December 2010	Firhill Stadium, Glasgow	Glasgow Warriors	30–18	Edinburgh	Glasgow Warriors (3); 47–46
4	2010–11	2 January 2011	Murrayfield Stadium, Edinburgh	Edinburgh	28–17	Glasgow Warriors	Glasgow Warriors (3); 47–46
5	2011–12	26 December 2011	Murrayfield Stadium, Edinburgh	Edinburgh	23–23	Glasgow Warriors	Glasgow Warriors (4); 40–35
5	2011–12	1 January 2012	Firhill Stadium, Glasgow	Glasgow Warriors	17–12	Edinburgh	Glasgow Warriors (4); 40–35
6	2012–13	21 December 2012	Scotstoun Stadium, Glasgow	Glasgow Warriors	23–14	Edinburgh	Glasgow Warriors (5); 44–31
6	2012–13	29 December 2012	Murrayfield Stadium, Edinburgh	Edinburgh	17–21	Glasgow Warriors	Glasgow Warriors (5); 44–31
7	2013–14	26 December 2013	Murrayfield Stadium, Edinburgh	Edinburgh	16–20	Glasgow Warriors	Glasgow Warriors (6); 57–50
7	2013–14	26 April 2014 (Note: Match originally scheduled for 1 January 2014, but was postponed due to a waterlogged pitch.)	Scotstoun Stadium, Glasgow	Glasgow Warriors	37–34	Edinburgh	Glasgow Warriors (6); 57–50
8	2014–15	27 December 2014	Scotstoun Stadium, Glasgow	Glasgow Warriors	16–6	Edinburgh	Edinburgh (2); 26–24
8	2014–15	2 January 2015	Murrayfield Stadium, Edinburgh	Edinburgh	20–8	Glasgow Warriors	Edinburgh (2); 26–24
9	2015–16	27 December 2015	Murrayfield Stadium, Edinburgh	Edinburgh	23–11	Glasgow Warriors	Edinburgh (3); 37–22
9	2015–16	2 January 2016	Murrayfield Stadium, Edinburgh (Note: Match originally scheduled to be played at Scotstoun Stadium, but was moved due to a waterlogged pitch.)	Glasgow Warriors	11–14	Edinburgh	Edinburgh (3); 37–22
10	2016–17	26 December 2016	Murrayfield Stadium, Edinburgh	Edinburgh	12–25	Glasgow Warriors	Glasgow Warriors (7); 43–41
10	2016–17	6 May 2017	Scotstoun Stadium, Glasgow	Glasgow Warriors	18–29	Edinburgh	Glasgow Warriors (7); 43–41

=== Three-match format (2017–18 to 2020–21) ===
With the introduction of the South African teams, the Cheetahs and the Southern Kings, and the new league format named the Pro14, Glasgow and Edinburgh were designated to different conferences, resulting in one regular meeting per season. Two additional derby matches were also scheduled each season, resulting in a three-game format for the Cup. The winner of the Cup was the team that won most matches, with the previous format of aggregate scores becoming the first tie-break criteria.

In the coronavirus pandemic-affected 2020–21 season, neither the Cheetahs and the Southern Kings entered the Pro14. The Pro14 organised a replacement tournament, the Pro14 Rainbow Cup, which ensured Glasgow and Edinburgh could contest three 1872 Cup fixtures.

Ed.	Year	Date	Venue	Home	Score	Away	Trophy winner Score
11	2017–18	23 December 2017	Murrayfield Stadium, Edinburgh	Edinburgh	18–17	Glasgow Warriors	Edinburgh (4); 2–1
11	2017–18	30 December 2017	Scotstoun Stadium, Glasgow	Glasgow Warriors	17–0	Edinburgh	Edinburgh (4); 2–1
11	2017–18	28 April 2018	Murrayfield Stadium, Edinburgh	Edinburgh	24–19	Glasgow Warriors	Edinburgh (4); 2–1
12	2018–19	22 December 2018	Murrayfield Stadium, Edinburgh	Edinburgh	23–7	Glasgow Warriors	Edinburgh (5); 2–1
12	2018–19	29 December 2018	Scotstoun Stadium, Glasgow	Glasgow Warriors	8–16	Edinburgh	Edinburgh (5); 2–1
12	2018–19	27 April 2019	Scotstoun Stadium, Glasgow	Glasgow Warriors	34–10	Edinburgh	Edinburgh (5); 2–1
13	2019–20	21 December 2019	Scotstoun Stadium, Glasgow	Glasgow Warriors	20–16	Edinburgh	Edinburgh (6); 2–1
13	2019–20	28 December 2019	Murrayfield Stadium, Edinburgh	Edinburgh	29–19	Glasgow Warriors	Edinburgh (6); 2–1
13	2019–20	22 August 2020 (Note: Match originally scheduled for w.o 29 May but postponed due to COVID-19 pandemic and then rescheduled to be played at Murrayfield but still contested as a Glasgow home leg.)	Murrayfield Stadium, Edinburgh	Glasgow Warriors	15–30	Edinburgh	Edinburgh (6); 2–1
14	2020–21	2 January 2021	Murrayfield Stadium, Edinburgh	Edinburgh	10–7	Glasgow Warriors	Glasgow Warriors (8); 2–1
14	2020–21	16 January 2021 (Note: Match originally scheduled for December 27th, 2020 but postponed to 8 January 2021 due to four confirmed positive cases of COVID-19 among the Glasgow Warriors, then to 16 January 2021 due to a frozen playing surface at Scotstoun.)	Scotstoun Stadium, Glasgow	Glasgow Warriors	23–22	Edinburgh	Glasgow Warriors (8); 2–1
14	2020–21	7 May 2021	Scotstoun Stadium, Glasgow	Glasgow Warriors	29–19	Edinburgh	Glasgow Warriors (8); 2–1

=== Two-match format (2021–22 onwards) ===
The introduction of 4 more South African teams, the Bulls, Lions, Sharks and Stormers, and the United Rugby Championship league format saw Glasgow and Edinburgh reunited in the same conference, resulting in a return to the traditional two meetings during each season.

Ed.	Year	Date	Venue	Home	Score	Away	Trophy winner Agg.
15	2021–22	18 March 2022	Scotstoun Stadium, Glasgow	Glasgow Warriors	30–17	Edinburgh	Edinburgh (7); 45–41
15	2021–22	21 May 2022	Murrayfield Stadium, Edinburgh	Edinburgh	28–11	Glasgow Warriors	Edinburgh (7); 45–41
16	2022–23	23 December 2022	Scotstoun Stadium, Glasgow	Glasgow Warriors	16–10	Edinburgh	Glasgow Warriors (9); 48–35
16	2022–23	30 December 2022	Murrayfield Stadium, Edinburgh	Edinburgh	25–32	Glasgow Warriors	Glasgow Warriors (9); 48–35
17	2023–24	23 December 2023	Scotstoun Stadium, Glasgow	Glasgow Warriors	22-10	Edinburgh	Glasgow Warriors (10); 36–29
17	2023–24	30 December 2023	Murrayfield Stadium, Edinburgh	Edinburgh	19–14	Glasgow Warriors	Glasgow Warriors (10); 36–29
18	2024–25	22 December 2024	Hampden Park, Glasgow	Glasgow Warriors	33–14	Edinburgh	Glasgow Warriors (11); 40–21
18	2024–25	28 December 2024	Murrayfield Stadium, Edinburgh	Edinburgh	10–7	Glasgow Warriors	Glasgow Warriors (11); 40–21
19	2025–26	20 December 2025	Hampden Park, Glasgow	Glasgow Warriors	24–12	Edinburgh	Glasgow Warriors (12); 45–15
19	2025–26	27 December 2025	Murrayfield Stadium, Edinburgh	Edinburgh	3–21	Glasgow Warriors	Glasgow Warriors (12); 45–15
20	2026–27	27 December 2026	Murrayfield Stadium, Edinburgh	Edinburgh		Glasgow Warriors	to be played
20	2026–27	24 April 2027	Hampden Park, Glasgow	Glasgow Warriors		Edinburgh	to be played

== See also ==
- Glasgow District - for results of Glasgow - Edinburgh matches from 1872 to 1953; the 'Inter-City'
- Edinburgh District - for results of Glasgow - Edinburgh matches from 1872 to 1953; the 'Inter-City'
- Scottish Inter-District Championship - for results of Glasgow - Edinburgh matches from 1953 to 2003 in that championship.
- Welsh-Scottish League - for results of Glasgow - Edinburgh matches from 1999 to 2002 in that championship.
- Pro12 - for results of Glasgow - Edinburgh matches. See especially 2001 to 2007 in that championship; before the 1872 Cup began.
- Pro14 - for results of Glasgow - Edinburgh matches from season 2017–18.
- - for a detailed season by season guide of Glasgow Warriors. This also includes 'friendly matches' between Glasgow - Edinburgh. For instance: 1999–2000 Glasgow Warriors season details 5 Glasgow - Edinburgh matches over the course of the season.
- - for a detailed season by season guide of Edinburgh Rugby.

=== Other celtic derbies ===
- Judgement Day - Welsh derbies
