= 2004–05 Glasgow Warriors season =

Glasgow Warriors 2004 / 2005
- Ground: Hughenden Stadium (Capacity: 6,000)
- Coach: (Scotland) Hugh Campbell
- Captain: (Scotland) Jon Petrie
- Most caps: (Scotland) Dan Turner (26)
- Top scorer: (Scotland) Dan Parks (201)
- Most tries: (Scotland) Sean Lamont (9)
- League: 2004–05 Celtic League
- 6th
Team kit

The 2004–05 season is the ninth in the history of the Glasgow Warriors as a professional side. During this season the young professional side competed as Glasgow Rugby.

The 2004–05 season saw Glasgow Rugby compete in the competitions:- the Celtic League; and the European Champions Cup, the Heineken Cup for sponsorship reasons; and the second and final season of the Celtic Cup.

== Team ==
=== Coaches ===
- Head coach: (Scotland) Hugh Campbell
- Assistant coach: (Scotland) Shade Munro
- Assistant coach: (Scotland) Sean Lineen

=== Staff ===
- Chairman: Bill Nolan
- Vice-chairman: Archie Ferguson
- Chief executive: David Jordan
- Media Manager: Bill McMurtrie
- Team Facilitator: Dougie Mills
- Sales & Marketing Executive: Gordon Hood
- Administration Manager: Diane Murphy
- Team doctor: Gerry Haggerty
- Physiotherapists: Bob Stewart, Lisa Casey

=== Squad ===
Hookers (Scotland) Gordon Bulloch (Scotland) Scott Lawson Props (Scotland) Lee Harrison (Scotland) Andrew Kelly (Scotland) Euan Murray (Canada) Kevin Tkachuk Locks (England) Joe Beardshaw (Scotland) Andrew Hall (Scotland) Nathan Ross (Scotland) Dan Turner	Loose forwards (Scotland) Paul Dearlove (Scotland) Donnie Macfadyen (Scotland) Cameron Mather (England) Alex Mockford (Scotland) Jon Petrie (Scotland) Andrew Wilson Half backs (Scotland) Graeme Beveridge (Scotland) Alasdhair McFarlane (Scotland) Richard McKnight (Scotland) Sam Pinder Stand offs (Scotland) Calvin Howarth (Scotland) Dan Parks	Centres (England) Scott Barrow (Scotland) Alan Bulloch (Scotland) Andy Craig (Scotland) Andrew Henderson (Scotland) Graeme Morrison Back Three (Scotland) Rory Kerr (Scotland) Rory Lamont (Scotland) Sean Lamont (Scotland) Kenny Logan (England) Gareth Maclure (Scotland) Dave Millard

==== Academy players ====
- (Scotland) Fergus Thomson - Hooker
- (Scotland) James Eddie - Flanker
- (Scotland) John Barclay - Flanker
- (Scotland) Johnnie Beattie - Number Eight
- (Scotland) Colin Gregor - Fly-half
- (Scotland) Steven Duffy - Fly-half

==== Back up players ====
- (Scotland) Eric Milligan
- (Scotland) Ben Prescott
- (New Zealand) Scott Lines
- (Scotland) Colin Shaw
- (Scotland) Wes Henry
- (Australia) Nick Lavell
- (Scotland) Scott Forrest
- (Scotland) Steven Manning
- (Scotland) Neil McKenzie
- (Scotland) Richard Maxton
- (Australia) Damien Kelly
- (South Africa) Jonathan van der Schyff
- (Scotland) Steve Swindall
- (South Africa) Shawn Renwick
- (Australia) Mark Sitch
- (Scotland) Ally Maclay

== Player statistics ==
During the 2004–05 season, Glasgow have used 39 different players in competitive games. The table below shows the number of appearances and points scored by each player.

Pos.	Nation	Name	Celtic League			Celtic Cup			Heineken Cup			Total	
Pos.	Nation	Name	Apps (sub)	Tries	Points kicked	Apps (sub)	Tries	Points kicked	Apps (sub)	Tries	Points kicked	Apps (sub)	Total pts
HK	(Scotland)	Gordon Bulloch	9(4)	0	0	0	0	0	5(1)	0	0	14(5)	0
HK	(Scotland)	Scott Lawson	11(8)	0	0	1	0	0	1(4)	1	0	13(12)	5
HK	(Scotland)	Eric Milligan	(2)	0	0	0	0	0	0	0	0	(2)	0
HK	(Scotland)	Fergus Thomson	(5)	0	0	(1)	0	0	0	0	0	(6)	0
PR	(Scotland)	Lee Harrison	8	0	0	0	0	0	3	0	0	11	0
PR	(Scotland)	Andrew Kelly	8{9)	0	0	0	0	0	1(3)	0	0	9(12)	0
PR	(Scotland)	Euan Murray	7(2)	0	0	1	0	0	2(1)	0	0	10(3)	0
PR	(Scotland)	Ben Prescott	(6)	0	0	(1)	0	0	(1)	0	0	(8)	0
PR	(Canada)	Kevin Tkachuk	17	2	0	1	0	0	6	0	0	17	10
LK	(England)	Joe Beardshaw	8(5)	1	0	1	0	0	2(1)	1	0	11(6)	10
LK	(Scotland)	Andrew Hall	13(7)	0	0	(1)	0	0	4	0	0	17(8)	0
LK	(Scotland)	Nathan Ross	1	0	0	0	0	0	0	0	0	1	0
LK	(Scotland)	Dan Turner	18(1)	1	0	1	0	0	6	0	0	25(1)	5
BR	(Scotland)	John Barclay	(3)	0	0	0	0	0	0	0	0	(3)	0
BR	(Scotland)	Johnnie Beattie	5(6)	0	0	0	0	0	(4)	0	0	5(10)	0
BR	(Scotland)	Paul Dearlove	8(5)	1	0	1	1	0	(2)	0	0	9(7)	10
BR	(Scotland)	Donnie Macfadyen	9	3	0	0	0	0	4	1	0	13	20
BR	(Scotland)	Cameron Mather	9	1	0	0	0	0	5	0	0	14	5
BR	(Scotland)	Jon Petrie	11	0	0	1	0	0	6	0	0	18	0
BR	(Scotland)	Steve Swindall	9(2)	1	0	1	0	0	0	0	0	10(2)	5
BR	(South Africa)	Jonathan van der Schyff	(1)	0	0	0	0	0	(1)	0	0	(2)	0
BR	(Scotland)	Andrew Wilson	9(6)	1	0	(1)	0	0	3(2)	0	0	12(9)	5
SH	(Scotland)	Graeme Beveridge	8(8)	1	0	1	0	0	3(3)	2	0	12(11)	15
SH	(Scotland)	Alasdhair McFarlane	(1)	0	0	0	0	0	0	0	0	(1)	0
SH	(Scotland)	Sam Pinder	12(5)	3	0	(1)	0	0	3(1)	0	0	15(7)	15
FH	(Scotland)	Colin Gregor	(4)	0	0	0	0	0	0	0	0	(4)	0
FH	(Scotland)	Calvin Howarth	12(3)	1	132	1	0	0	4(2)	0	20	17(5)	157
FH	(Scotland)	Dan Parks	10(3)	4	133	1	0	14	4(1)	0	34	15(4)	201
CE	(England)	Scott Barrow	9(1)	0	0	1	0	0	0	0	0	10(1)	0
CE	(Scotland)	Andy Craig	9(1)	0	0	(1)	0	0	4	0	0	13(2)	0
CE	(Scotland)	Andrew Henderson	12(4)	1	0	1	0	0	4(1)	0	0	17(5)	5
CE	(Scotland)	Graeme Morrison	11(2)	1	0	0	0	0	4(1)	0	0	15(3)	5
WG	(Scotland)	Rory Lamont	11	5	0	1	0	0	0	0	0	12	25
WG	(Scotland)	Sean Lamont	11	5	0	1	1	0	6	3	0	18	45
WG	(Scotland)	Kenny Logan	11(3)	5	0	(1)	0	0	4(1)	0	0	15(5)	25
WG	(England)	Gareth Maclure	6(2)	0	0	0	0	0	3	2	0	9(2)	10
WG	(Scotland)	Dave Millard	2(2)	0	0	0	0	0	(2)	0	0	2(4)	0
WG	(Scotland)	Colin Shaw	7(3)	1	0	0	0	0	0	0	0	7(3)	5
FB	(Scotland)	Rory Kerr	9(1)	0	0	0	0	0	3(1)	0	0	12(2)	0

== Staff movements ==
=== Coaches ===
==== Personnel in ====
- Mark Bitcon - Fitness coach from (England) Wasps

==== Personnel out ====
None.

== Player movements ==
=== Player transfers ===
==== In ====
(Scotland) Andy Craig from (England) Orrell
(Canada) Kevin Tkachuk from (England) Birmingham & Solihull
(Scotland) Kenny Logan from (England) Wasps
(Scotland) Dan Turner from (New Zealand) Canterbury
(Scotland) John Barclay from (Scotland) Dollar Academy
(Scotland) Johnnie Beattie from (Scotland) Aberdeen GSFP RFC
(Scotland) Steven Duffy from (Scotland) Glasgow Hawks
(Scotland) James Eddie from (Scotland) Glasgow Hutchesons Aloysians
(Scotland) Colin Gregor from (Scotland) Watsonians RFC
(Scotland) Fergus Thomson from (Scotland) Glasgow Hawks
(England) Scott Barrow from (England) Rotherham
(Scotland) Rory Lamont from (Scotland) Glasgow Hawks

==== Out ====
(Scotland) Rory McKay to (Australia) Manly RUFC
(Scotland) Glenn Metcalfe to (France) Castres Olympique
(Scotland) Jon Steel to (Scotland) Border Reivers
(Scotland) Stuart Moffat to (Scotland) Border Reivers
(New Zealand) Joe Naufahu to (Scotland) Glasgow Hutchesons Aloysians
(Scotland) Alan Bulloch to (Scotland) Glasgow Hutchesons Aloysians
(Scotland) Kenny Sinclair to (Scotland) Glasgow Hawks
(New Zealand) Simon Gunn released
(Scotland) Roland Reid to (England) London Irish
(Scotland) Mark McMillan to (England) Yorkshire Carnegie
(Scotland) Matt Proudfoot released

== Competitions ==
=== Pre-season and friendlies ===
==== Match 1 ====
13 August 2004
8 pm

(England) Leeds Tykes	34 - 3	(Scotland) Glasgow Warriors
Try: Pierre Uys; Tom Biggs; Jon Dunbar; Richard Parks penalty try Con: Duncan Hodge x 2 Gordon Ross; Pen: Duncan Hodge	Preview; Report	Pen: Calvin Howarth

Headingley Stadium

Leeds Tykes: ?
Replacements: ?

Glasgow Warriors:
G Beveridge, A Bulloch, C Gregor, A Henderson, C Howarth, R Lamont, S Lamont, K Logan, R McKnight, D Millard, C Shaw, J Beardshaw,
J Beattie, G Bulloch, P Dearlove, A Hall, L Harrison, A Kelly, S Lawson, E Milligan, J Petrie, S Renwick, N Ross, S Swindall, K Tkachuk, D Turner. Replacements:

==== Match 2 ====
20 August 2004
7.30pm

(Scotland) Glasgow Warriors	20 - 39	(England) Sale Sharks
Try: Scott Barrow; Andy Hall; Con: Calvin Howarth; Colin Gregor; Pen: Calvin Howarth; Colin Gregor	Preview; Report; Report	Try: Chris Mayor x 2 Steve Hanley; Mike Hercus; John Carter; Con: Mike Hercus x 4 Pen: Mike Hercus x 2

Hughenden Stadium
Attendance: 1200
Referee: Mike Hall (Boroughmuir)

Glasgow Warriors:Kevin Tkachuk, Scott Lawson, Lee Harrison, Nathan Ross, Andy Hall, Paul Dearlove, Jon Petrie (captain), Shawn Renwick,
Graeme Beveridge, Calvin Howarth, Kenny Logan, Andrew Henderson, Graeme Morrison, Rory Kerr, Rory Lamont
Replacements: used: Scott Barrow, Alex Mockford, Alasdhair McFarlane, Dan Turner, Colin Gregor, Dave Millard, Sean Lamont, Johnnie Beattie; not used: Fergus Thomson, Gordon Bulloch, Andy Kelly, Donnie Macfadyen

Sale Sharks:Chris Mayor; Mark Cueto, Jos Baxendell (captain), Robert Todd, Steve Hanley; Mike Hercus, Bryan Redpath; Trevor Woodman, Sebastien Bruno, Andrew Sheridan, Dean Schofield, Christian Day, Jason White, Sebastian Chabel, John Carter
Replacements: Stuart Turner, Andrew Titterell, Barry Stewart, Pierre Caillet, Hugh Perrett, Sililo Martens, Charlie Hodgson, Mike Bartlett, Chris Jones, James Moore, Richard Wigglesworth

==== Match 3 ====
27 August 2004
7.45pm

(England) Sale Sharks	43 - 6	(Scotland) Glasgow Warriors
Try: Dean Schofield; Steve Hanley; Mark Cueto; Sébastien Chabal; Chris Mayor; Jason Robinson; Con: Charlie Hodgson x 2 Pen: Charlie Hodgson x 2 Drop: Charlie Hodgson	Preview; Report; Report	Pen: Colin Gregor x 2

Edgeley Park
Referee: S.Lander (RFU)

Sale Sharks:Jason Robinson (captain); Mark Cueto, Jos Baxendell, Robert Todd, Steve Hanley; Charlie Hodgson, Sililo Martens
Trevor Woodman, Andy Titterrell, Barry Stewart, Dean Schofield, Chris Day, Jason White, Sebastien Chabal, Magnus Lund
Replacements: Chris Mayor, Chris Rhys Jones, Mike Hercus, Bryan Redpath, Andrew Sheridan, Stuart Turner, Pierre Caillet, Sebastien Bruno, John Carter, Hugh Perrett

Glasgow Warriors:Kevin Tkachuk, Scott Lawson, Lee Harrison, Nathan Ross, Dan Turner, Andy Hall, Donnie Macfadyen, Paul Dearlove,
Sam Pinder, Colin Gregor, Kenny Logan (captain), Scott Barrow, Graeme Morrison, Sean Lamont, Rory Kerr
Replacements: used: Joe Beardshaw, Andy Kelly, Calvin Howarth, Steve Swindall, Graeme Beveridge, Andrew Henderson, Andy Hall
Dave Millard; not used: Gordon Bulloch

==== Match 4 ====
20 September 2004
7.30 pm

(Scotland) Glasgow Warriors	26 - 21	(England) Newcastle Falcons
Try: Johnnie Beattie; Andy Craig; Ally Maclay; Dave Millard; Con: Calvin Howarth x 3	Preview; Report; Report	Try: Danny Brown; Lee Dickson; Johnny Williams; Con: Toby Flood x 3

Hughenden Stadium
Referee: Andy Ireland (SRU)

Glasgow Warriors:Rory Lamont; Steven Manning, Andy Craig, Ally Maclay, David Millard; Calvin Howarth, Graeme Beveridge; Elliot McLaren,
Ferguson Thomson, Fraser Mackinnon, James Eddie, Sandy Warnock, John Beattie, Shawn Renwick, Neil McKenzie.
Replacements: Colin Shaw, Colin Gregor, Alasdhair McFarlane, Andrew Kelly, Stuart Fenwick, Donald Malcolm, Andrew Wilson, Alan Kelly, Stevie Swindall (all used)

Newcastle Falcons: Ed Burrill; Amarveer Ladhar, Adam Dehaty, Mark Laycock, Stephen Jones; Toby Flood, Lee Dickson; Jonny Williams, Rob Vickers, Ed Kalman, Andy Buist, Geoff Parling, Eni Gesinde, Greg Irwin, Ed Williamson
Replacements: Danny Brown, Rupert Neville, Mark Darlington, Gareth Kerr, Jason Smithson, Jack Harrison, Jamie Rennie, Stuart Walker

==== Match 5 ====
11 October 2004
3pm

(England) Sale Sharks	7 - 36	(Scotland) Glasgow Warriors
Try: Mike Hills; Con: David Blair	Preview; Report; Report; Report	Try: Andy Craig x3 Rory Lamont x 2 Shaun Renwick; Pen: Colin Gregor; Calvin Howarth x 2

Edgeley Park

Sale Sharks: Alex Davies; Matt Riley, Adam Robson, Jason Duffy, Olly Viney; David Blair, Ben Foden; Danny Greenhalgh, Neil Dowridge, Martin Halsall, Steve Burns, Ben Lloyd, Stuart Coackley, Mike Hills, Adam Newton.
Replacements: Chris Leck, Mark Simpson-Daniel, Chris Briers, Tom Mantell, Aled Davies, Matt Sheen, Dan Hall, Daniel Fernandez-Arias.

Glasgow Warriors: Andy Kelly (Glasgow), Fergus Thomson (Apprentice & Glasgow Hawks), Donald Malcolm (Academy & GHA), Elliot McLaren (Biggar), Stuart Fenwick (Ayr), Euan Murray (Glasgow), Jonathan van der Schyff (Currie), Steve Swindall (Glasgow Hawks), Andy Wilson (Glasgow), John Beattie (Apprentice & GHA), Shawn Renwick (Stirling County), Andy Dunlop (Biggar), Graeme Beveridge (Glasgow), Alasdhair McFarlane (Hillhead/Jordanhill), Calvin Howarth (Glasgow), Colin Gregor (Apprentice & Watsonians), Andy Craig (Glasgow), Rory Lamont (Glasgow), Dave Millard (Glasgow), Colin Shaw (Hawks), Steven Manning (Ayr) Replacements: all used.

=== European Champions Cup ===
==== Pool 3 ====
Team	P	W	D	L	Tries for	Tries against	Try diff	Points for	Points against	Points diff	TB	LB	Pts
(France) Toulouse (2)	6	5	0	1	21	9	12	181	104	77	3	1	24
(England) Northampton Saints (7)	6	5	0	1	11	7	4	128	101	27	1	0	21
(Wales) Llanelli Scarlets	6	2	0	4	15	17	−2	132	157	−25	3	2	13
(Scotland) Glasgow Warriors	6	0	0	6	11	25	−14	107	186	−79	0	2	2

==== Results ====
===== Round 1 =====
24 October 2004
1pm

(1BP) Glasgow Warriors (Scotland)	9 – 13	(England) Northampton Saints
Pen: Dan Parks x 3	Preview; Report; Report; Report	Try: Ben Cohen; Con: Shane Drahm; Pen: Shane Drahm x 2

Hughenden Stadium
Attendance: 2,772
Referee: Eric Darriere (France)

===== Round 2 =====
29 October 2004
8.30pm

(1BP) Toulouse (France)	43 – 17	(Scotland) Glasgow Warriors
Try: Cédric Heymans; Frédéric Michalak; Grégory Lamboley; Trevor Brennan; Isitolo Maka; Yannick Bru; Con: Cédric Heymans; Jean-Baptiste Élissalde x 4 Pen: Jean-Baptiste Élissalde	Preview; Report; Report; Report	Try: Sean Lamont; Donnie Macfadyen; Con: Dan Parks x 2 Pen: Dan Parks

Stade Ernest Wallon
Attendance: 14,136
Referee: Nigel Owens (Wales)

===== Round 3 =====
5 December 2004
1pm

(1BP) Glasgow Warriors (Scotland)	26 – 29	(Wales) Llanelli Scarlets (1BP)
Try: Gareth Maclure; Graeme Beveridge; Con: Calvin Howarth x 2 Pen: Calvin Howarth x 4	Preview; Report; Report; Report	Try: Garan Evans; Matthew Watkins x 2 Gavin Thomas; Con: Gareth Bowen x 3 Pen: Gareth Bowen

Hughenden Stadium
Attendance: 2,281
Referee: Roy Maybank (England)

===== Round 4 =====
12 December 2004
13:00

(1BP) Llanelli Scarlets (Wales)	38 – 22	(Scotland) Glasgow Warriors
Try: Aisea Havili x 2 Tal Selley x 2 Vernon Cooper; Con: Matthew Watkins; Gareth Bowen; Pen: Gareth Bowen x 3	Preview; Report; Report; Report	Try: Sean Lamont x 2 Scott Lawson; Con: Calvin Howarth x 2 Pen: Calvin Howarth

Stradey Park
Attendance: 4,500
Referee: Joël Jutge (France)

===== Round 5 =====
7 January 2005
19:30

Glasgow Warriors (Scotland)	10 – 30	(France) Toulouse (1BP)
Try: Joe Beardshaw; Con: Dan Parks; Pen: Dan Parks	Preview; Report; Report; Report	Try: Nicolas Jeanjean; Vincent Clerc; Florian Fritz; Grégory Lamboley; Con: Jean-Baptiste Élissalde x 2 Pen: Jean-Baptiste Élissalde x 2

Hughenden Stadium
Attendance: 3,246
Referee: Tony Spreadbury (England)

===== Round 6 =====
14 January 2005
19:30

(1BP) Northampton Saints (England)	33 – 23	(Scotland) Glasgow Warriors
Try: Bruce Reihana x 2 Ben Cohen; Steve Thompson; Mark Soden; Con: Shane Drahm x 4	Preview; Report; Report; Report	Try: Sean Lamont; Graeme Beveridge; Con: Dan Parks x 2 Pen: Dan Parks x 3

Franklin's Gardens
Attendance: 11,976
Referee: Nigel Whitehouse (Wales)

=== Magners Celtic League ===
==== League table ====
	Team	Pld	W	D	L	PF	PA	PD	TF	TA	Try bonus	Losing bonus	Pts
1	(Wales) Neath-Swansea Ospreys	20	16	1	3	508	267	+241	53	27	7	3	76
2	(Ireland) Munster	20	15	1	4	470	331	+139	54	33	6	1	69
3	(Ireland) Leinster	20	12	1	7	455	350	+105	46	32	4	3	57
4	(Wales) Newport Gwent Dragons	20	11	0	9	381	436	−55	39	43	4	2	50
5	(Wales) Llanelli Scarlets	20	9	0	11	402	446	−44	48	42	7	3	46
6	(Scotland) Glasgow Warriors	20	8	1	11	465	466	−1	40	58	4	7	45
7	(Scotland) Edinburgh	20	9	0	11	409	407	+2	47	40	4	4	44
8	(Ireland) Ulster	20	9	0	11	363	387	−24	37	34	2	5	43
9	(Wales) Cardiff Blues	20	8	1	11	350	404	−54	35	41	2	4	40
10	(Ireland) Connacht	20	7	1	12	317	407	−90	32	46	2	5	37
11	(Scotland) Borders	20	3	0	17	337	556	−219	31	66	2	4	18
Under the standard bonus point system, points are awarded as follows: 4 points for a win; 2 points for a draw; 1 bonus point for scoring 4 tries (or more) (Try bonus); 1 bonus point for losing by 7 points (or fewer) (Losing bonus)
Source: RaboDirect PRO12

==== Results ====
===== Round 1 =====
4 September 2004
14:30

(1BP) Connacht (Ireland)	31 – 15	(Scotland) Glasgow Warriors
Try: Matt Mostyn; Paul Warwick; Matt Lacey; John Muldoon; Con: Eric Elwood; Pen: Eric Elwood x 2	Preview; Report; Report; Report	Try: Kenny Logan; Dan Parks; Con: Dan Parks; Pen: Dan Parks

Sportsground
Attendance: 2,137
Referee: Phil Fear (Wales)

===== Round 2 =====
11 September 2004
15:00

Border Reivers (Scotland)	7 – 10	(Scotland) Glasgow Warriors
Try: Stuart Moffat; Con: Charlie Hore	Preview; Report; Report; Report	Try: Sam Pinder; Con: Dan Parks; Pen: Dan Parks

The Greenyards
Attendance: 1,250
Referee: Hugh Watkins (Wales)

===== Round 3 =====
18 September 2004
19:30

Glasgow Warriors (Scotland)	12 – 10	(Scotland) Edinburgh
Pen: Dan Parks x 3 Drop: Dan Parks	Preview; Report; Report; Report	Try: Dave Callam; Con: Chris Paterson; Pen: Chris Paterson

Old Anniesland
Attendance: 2,117
Referee: Olan Trevor (Ireland)

===== Round 4 =====
24 September 2004
19:30

Glasgow Warriors (Scotland)	29 – 38	(Wales) Newport Gwent Dragons
Try: Donnie Macfadyen; Paul Dearlove; Con: Dan Parks x 2 Pen: Dan Parks x 5	Preview; Report; Report; Report	Try: Gareth Cooper; Rod Snow; Kevin Morgan; Jamie Ringer; Con: Ceri Sweeney x 3 Pen: Ceri Sweeney x 3 Drop: Sione Tuipulotu

Hughenden Stadium
Attendance: 1,918
Referee: Alistair McKay (Ireland)

===== Round 5 =====
2 October 2004
17:30

Neath-Swansea Ospreys (Wales)	40 – 17	(Scotland) Glasgow Warriors
Try: Ryan Jones; Andrew Millward; Sonny Parker; Richard Mustoe; Steve Tandy; Dai Bishop; Con: Gavin Henson x 2 Pen: Gavin Henson x 2	Preview; Report; Report; Report	Try: Cameron Mather; Donnie Macfadyen; Con: Calvin Howarth; Dan Parks; Pen: Dan Parks

St Helen's
Attendance: 4,086
Referee: Alan Lewis (Ireland)

===== Round 6 =====
9 October 2004
19:30

Glasgow Warriors (Scotland)	26 – 28	(Ireland) Munster
Try: Donnie Macfadyen; Andrew Henderson; Con: Dan Parks x 2 Pen: Dan Parks x 4	Preview; Report; Report; Report	Try: Christian Cullen x 2 Anthony Horgan; Frank Sheahan; Con: Ronan O'Gara; Pen: Ronan O'Gara; Drop: Ronan O'Gara

Hughenden Stadium
Attendance: 2,625
Referee: Nigel Whitehouse (Wales)

===== Round 7 =====
16 October 2004
19:15

Glasgow Warriors (Scotland)	34 – 20	(Ireland) Ulster
Try: Kevin Tkachuk; Dan Parks x 2 Graeme Morrison; Con: Dan Parks x 4 Pen: Dan Parks x 2	Preview; Report; Report; Report	Try: Tommy Bowe; Tyrone Howe; Con: David Humphreys x 2 Pen: David Humphreys x 2

Hughenden Stadium
Attendance: 3,469
Referee: Nigel Williams (Wales)

===== Round 8 =====
5 November 2004
19:30

Glasgow Warriors (Scotland)	36 – 22	(Scotland) Border Reivers
Try: Kenny Logan; Sam Pinder; Con: Calvin Howarth; Pen: Calvin Howarth x 8	Preview; Report; Report; Report	Try: Steve Scott; Mark Blair; Iain Berthinussen; Con: Ali Warnock x 2 Pen: Charlie Hore

Hughenden Stadium
Attendance: 1,765
Referee: Ally McKay (Ireland)

===== Round 9 =====
13 November 2004
17:30

Cardiff Blues (Wales)	24 – 19	(Scotland) Glasgow Warriors
Try: Freddie Tuilagi; Kort Schubert; Con: Lee Thomas; Pen: Lee Thomas x 4	Preview; Report; Report; Report	Try: Andy Wilson; Con: Calvin Howarth; Pen: Calvin Howarth x 4

Cardiff Arms Park
Attendance: 2,799
Referee: George Clancy (Ireland)

===== Round 10 =====
19 November 2004
19:30

Glasgow Warriors (Scotland)	40 – 29	(Wales) Llanelli Scarlets
Try: Kenny Logan x 2 Graeme Beveridge; Calvin Howarth; Con: Calvin Howarth x 4 Pen: Calvin Howarth x 4	Preview; Report; Report; Report	Try: Barry Davies; Salesi Finau; Mike Phillips; Garan Evans; Con: Gareth Bowen x 3 Pen: Gareth Bowen

Hughenden Stadium
Attendance: 1,751
Referee: David Keane (Ireland)

===== Round 11 =====
26 November 2004
19:30

Leinster (Ireland)	22 – 16	(Scotland) Glasgow Warriors
Try: David Holwell; Shane Jennings; Ben Gissing; Con: David Holwell x 2 Pen: David Holwell	Preview; Report; Report; Report	Try: Colin Shaw; Con: Calvin Howarth; Pen: Calvin Howarth x 3

Donnybrook
Attendance: 4,370
Referee: Neil Ballard (Wales)

===== Round 12 =====
17 December 2004
19:30

Glasgow Warriors (Scotland)	35 – 0	(Ireland) Connacht
Try: Donnie Macfadyen; Kevin Tkachuk; Sean Lamont x 2 Con: Calvin Howarth x 2 Dan Parks; Pen: Calvin Howarth x 3	Preview; Report; Report; Report

Hughenden Stadium
Attendance: 1,423
Referee: Steve Leyshon (England)

===== Round 13 =====
27 December 2004
15:00

Edinburgh (Scotland)	18 – 12	(Scotland) Glasgow Warriors
Try: Craig Joiner; Hugo Southwell; Con: Phil Godman; Pen: Brendan Laney	Preview; Report; Report; Report	Pen: Calvin Howarth x 3 Dan Parks

Murrayfield Stadium
Attendance: 3,932
Referee: Dave Pearson (England)

===== Round 14 =====
Glasgow Warriors sat out round.

===== Round 15 =====
22 January 2005
14:30

Newport Gwent Dragons (Wales)	21 – 16	(Scotland) Glasgow Warriors
Try: Percy Montgomery; Chris Anthony; Ceri Sweeney; Con: Ceri Sweeney x 3	Preview; Report; Report; Report	Try: Kevin Tkachuk; Con: Dan Parks; Pen: Dan Parks x 2 Drop: Dan Parks

Rodney Parade
Attendance: 4,072
Referee: Colin Stanley (Ireland)

===== Round 16 =====
29 January 2005
19:45

Glasgow Warriors (Scotland)	27 – 27	(Wales) Neath-Swansea Ospreys
Try: Kenny Logan; Joe Beardshaw; Rory Lamont; Con: Calvin Howarth x 3 Pen: Calvin Howarth x 2	Preview; Report; Report; Report	Try: Stefan Terblanche; Andrew Millward; Richie Rees; Con: Shaun Connor; Matt Jones x 2 Pen: Shaun Connor x 2

Hughenden Stadium
Attendance: 1,715
Referee: George Clancy (Ireland)

===== Round 17 =====
20 February 2005
17:00

Munster (Ireland)	25 – 19	(Scotland) Glasgow Warriors
Try: Alan Quinlan; Jason Holland; James Storey; Con: Paul Burke x 2 Pen: Paul Burke x 2	Preview; Report; Report; Report	Try: Dan Turner; Con: Calvin Howarth; Pen: Calvin Howarth x 4

Thomond Park
Attendance: 5,000
Referee: Jonathan Kaplan (South Africa)

===== Round 18 =====
4 March 2005
19:30

Ulster (Ireland)	30 – 3	(Scotland) Glasgow Warriors
Try: Kevin Maggs; Tommy Bowe; Tyrone Howe; Simon Best; Con: Adam Larkin; Paddy Wallace; Pen: Adam Larkin x 2	Preview; Report; Report; Report	Pen: Calvin Howarth

Ravenhill
Attendance: 6,215
Referee: Nigel Owens (Wales)

===== Round 19 =====
Glasgow Warriors sat out round.

===== Round 20 =====
25 March 2005
19:30

Glasgow Warriors (Scotland)	19 – 14	(Wales) Cardiff Blues
Try: Sean Lamont; Con: Calvin Howarth; Pen: Calvin Howarth x 2 Dan Parks x 2	Preview; Report; Report; Report	Try: Craig Quinnell; Con: Nicky Robinson; Pen: Nick Macleod; Drop: Nicky Robinson

Hughenden Stadium
Attendance: 3,787
Referee: Alistair McKay (Ireland)

===== Round 21 =====
9 April 2005
17:30

Llanelli Scarlets (Wales)	30 – 57	(Scotland) Glasgow Warriors
Try: Vernon Cooper; Barry Davies; Aisea Havili x 2 Tal Selley; Con: Gareth Bowen; Pen: Gareth Bowen	Preview; Report; Report; Report	Try: Sean Lamont x 2 Sam Pinder; Steve Swindall; Rory Lamont x 3 Con: Dan Parks x 5 Pen: Dan Parks x 4

Stradey Park
Attendance: 6,480
Referee: Simon McDowell (Ireland)

===== Round 22 =====
16 April 2005
19:30

Glasgow Warriors (Scotland)	23 – 30	(Ireland) Leinster
Try: Rory Lamont; Dan Parks; Con: Dan Parks x 2 Pen: Dan Parks x 3	Preview; Report; Report; Report	Try: Girvan Dempsey; Ben Gissing; Kieran Lewis; Con: David Holwell x 3 Pen: David Holwell x 3

Hughenden Stadium
Attendance: 4,364
Referee: Phil Fear (Wales)

=== Celtic Cup ===
Only 8 sides contested this year's Celtic Cup so the competition effectively began at the quarter-final stage.

The match pairings were decided by the finishes in the previous year's Celtic League.

==== Results ====
===== Quarter-final =====
29 April 2005
19:30

Leinster (Ireland)	33-24	(Scotland) Glasgow Warriors
Try: Girvan Dempsey; Victor Costello; Gordon D'Arcy x 2 Brian O'Driscoll; Con: David Holwell x 4	Preview; Report; Report; Report	Try: Paul Dearlove; Sean Lamont; Pen: Dan Parks x 5

Lansdowne Road
Attendance: 4500
Referee: Nigel Williams (Wales)

== End of Season awards ==
Award	Winner
Player of the Season	(Scotland) Sean Lamont
Lifetime achievement	(Scotland) Frank Harrow, Kilmarnock RFC

== Competitive debuts this season ==
A player's nationality shown is taken from the nationality at the highest honour for the national side obtained; or if never capped internationally their place of birth. Senior caps take precedence over junior caps or place of birth; junior caps take precedence over place of birth. A player's nationality at debut may be different from the nationality shown. Combination sides like the British and Irish Lions or Pacific Islanders are not national sides, or nationalities.

Players in BOLD font have been capped by their senior international XV side as nationality shown.

Players in Italic font have capped either by their international 7s side; or by the international XV 'A' side as nationality shown.

Players in normal font have not been capped at senior level.

A position in parentheses indicates that the player debuted as a substitute. A player may have made a prior debut for Glasgow Warriors in a non-competitive match, 'A' match or 7s match; these matches are not listed.

Tournaments where competitive debut made:

**Scottish Inter-District Championship**	**Welsh–Scottish League**	**WRU Challenge Cup**	**Celtic League**	**Celtic Cup**	**1872 Cup**	**Pro12**	**Pro14**	**Rainbow Cup**	**United Rugby Championship**	**European Challenge Cup**	**Heineken Cup / European Champions Cup**

Crosshatching indicates a jointly hosted match.

Number	Player nationality	Name	Position	Date of debut	Venue	Stadium	Opposition nationality	Opposition side	Tournament	Match result	Scoring debut
126	(Canada)	**Kevin Tkachuk**	Prop	2004-09-04	Away	Galway Sportsgrounds	(Ireland)	Connacht	Celtic League	Loss	Nil
127	(England)	Scott Barrow	Centre	2004-09-04	Away	Galway Sportsgrounds	(Ireland)	Connacht	Celtic League	Loss	Nil
128	(Scotland)	Dan Turner	(Lock)	2004-09-04	Away	Galway Sportsgrounds	(Ireland)	Connacht	Celtic League	Loss	Nil
129	(Scotland)	**Andy Craig**	(Centre)	2004-09-11	Away	The Greenyards	(Scotland)	Border Reivers	Celtic League	Win	Nil
130	(Scotland)	**Johnnie Beattie**	(Flanker)	2004-09-18	Home	Old Anniesland	(Scotland)	Edinburgh	Celtic League	Win	Nil
131	(Scotland)	Steve Swindall	(Flanker)	2004-10-02	Away	St. Helen's	(Wales)	Ospreys	Celtic League	Loss	Nil
132	(Scotland)	**Rory Lamont**	Full back	2004-11-05	Home	Hughenden Stadium	(Scotland)	Border Reivers	Celtic League	Win	Nil
133	(Scotland)	**John Barclay**	(Flanker)	2004-11-05	Home	Hughenden Stadium	(Scotland)	Border Reivers	Celtic League	Win	Nil
134	(Scotland)	Colin Shaw	(Full back)	2004-11-13	Away	Cardiff Arms Park	(Wales)	Cardiff Blues	Celtic League	Loss	Nil
135	(South Africa)	Jonathan van der Schyff	(Lock)	2005-01-22	Away	Rodney Parade	(Wales)	Dragons	Celtic League	Loss	Nil
136	(Scotland)	Alasdhair McFarlane	(Scrum half)	2005-02-20	Away	Thomond Park	(Ireland)	Munster	Celtic League	Loss	Nil

== Sponsorship ==
=== Main Sponsor ===
- Highland Spring

=== Official kit supplier ===
Cotton Traders

=== Club Sponsors ===
- Maclay Murray & Spens
- Clyde 1
- Scotland on Sunday
- The Glasgow Club
- Musashi
- Scotland against Drugs
