= 2009–10 Glasgow Warriors season =

Glasgow Warriors 2009 / 2010
- Ground: Firhill Stadium (Capacity: 10,887)
- Coach: (Scotland) Sean Lineen
- Captain: (Scotland) Alastair Kellock
- Most caps: (Argentina) Bernardo Stortoni (25)
- Top scorer: (Scotland) Dan Parks (277)
- Most tries: (Scotland) Thom Evans (Argentina) Bernardo Stortoni (5)
- League: Celtic League
- 3rd
Team kit	2nd kit

The 2009–10 season saw Glasgow Warriors compete in the competitions: the Magners Celtic League and the European Champions Cup, the Heineken Cup.

== Team ==
=== Squad ===
Hookers (Scotland) Dougie Hall (Scotland) Pat MacArthur (Scotland) Fergus Thomson Props (Scotland) Ed Kalman (Scotland) Moray Low (Scotland) Hamish Mitchell (Canada) Kevin Tkachuk (Samoa) Justin Va'a (Scotland) Jon Welsh Locks (Ireland) Tim Barker (Scotland) Richie Gray (Scotland) Alastair Kellock (Scotland) Dan Turner	Loose forwards (Scotland) John Barclay (Scotland) Johnnie Beattie (Scotland) Kelly Brown (Scotland) James Eddie (Scotland) Scott Forrest (Scotland) Calum Forrester (Scotland) Richie Vernon Scrum halves (Scotland) Chris Cusiter (Scotland) Colin Gregor (Scotland) Mark McMillan Fly halves (Scotland) Mike Adamson (Scotland) Ruaridh Jackson (Scotland) Dan Parks	Centres (Scotland) Max Evans (Scotland) Peter Horne (Scotland) Chris Kinloch (Scotland) Graeme Morrison (Scotland) Peter Murchie Back Three (Scotland) Rob Dewey (Scotland) Thom Evans (Scotland) Dave McCall (Scotland) Hefin O'Hare (Scotland) Colin Shaw (Argentina) Bernardo Stortoni (Canada) D. T. H. van der Merwe

==== Academy players ====
- (Scotland) Chris Fusaro - Flanker
- (Scotland) Alex Dunbar - Centre

==== Back-up players ====
- (Scotland) Paul Burke (Ayr) – Flanker

== Player statistics ==
During the 2009–10 season, Glasgow have used 37 different players in competitive games. The table below shows the number of appearances and points scored by each player.

Position	Nation	Name	Celtic League			Champions Cup			Total	
Position	Nation	Name	Apps (sub)	Tries	Points kicked	Apps (sub)	Tries	Points kicked	Apps (sub)	Total pts
HK	(Scotland)	Dougie Hall	14(4)	0	0	5	0	0	19(4)	0
HK	(Scotland)	Pat MacArthur	(5)	0	0	(3)	0	0	(8)	0
HK	(Scotland)	Fergus Thomson	5(6)	1	0	1(3)	1	0	6(9)	10
PR	(Scotland)	Ed Kalman	4(4)	0	0	1(5)	0	0	5(9)	0
PR	(Scotland)	Moray Low	16(1)	0	0	5	0	0	21(1)	0
PR	(Canada)	Kevin Tkachuk	4(14)	0	0	(6)	1	0	4(20)	5
PR	(Samoa)	Justin Va'a	1	0	0	(1)	0	0	1(1)	0
PR	(Scotland)	Jon Welsh	13	0	0	6	0	0	19	0
LK	(Ireland)	Tim Barker	13(1)	0	0	2(1)	0	0	15(2)	0
LK	(Scotland)	Richie Gray	8(1)	0	0	4	0	0	12(1)	0
LK	(Scotland)	Alastair Kellock	13(1)	0	0	4	0	0	17(1)	5
LK	(Scotland)	Dan Turner	4(14)	0	0	2(4)	0	0	6(18)	0
BR	(Scotland)	John Barclay	14	1	0	5	0	0	19	5
BR	(Scotland)	Johnnie Beattie	13(2)	2	0	4(1)	1	0	17(3)	15
BR	(Scotland)	Kelly Brown	14(1)	0	0	4(2)	0	0	18(3)	0
BR	(Scotland)	James Eddie	4(2)	1	0	(2)	0	0	4(4)	5
BR	(Scotland)	Calum Forrester	4(3)	1	0	1(1)	0	0	5(4)	5
BR	(Scotland)	Richie Vernon	7(7)	1	0	4	0	0	11(7)	5
SH	(Scotland)	Chris Cusiter	10(2)	0	0	4	1	0	14(2)	5
SH	(Scotland)	Colin Gregor	1(12)	1	6	2(3)	0	3	3(15)	14
SH	(Scotland)	Mark McMillan	8(7)	0	2	(5)	0	0	8(12)	2
FH	(Scotland)	Ruaridh Jackson	3(4)	1	11	1(1)	0	11	4(5)	27
FH	(Scotland)	Dan Parks	16	0	216	5(1)	0	61	21(1)	277
FH	(Scotland)	Duncan Weir	(2)	0	0	0	0	0	(2)	0
CE	(Scotland)	Rob Dewey	7(1)	3	0	3	1	0	10(1)	20
CE	(Scotland)	Alex Dunbar	1	0	0	0	0	0	1	0
CE	(Scotland)	Max Evans	10	2	0	4	1	0	14	15
CE	(Scotland)	Peter Horne	3(3)	0	0	(2)	0	0	3(5)	0
CE	(Scotland)	Chris Kinloch	(2)	0	0	0	0	0	(2)	0
CE	(Scotland)	Graeme Morrison	16	1	0	4	0	0	20	5
WG	(Scotland)	Thom Evans	9	4	0	5	1	0	14	25
WG	(Scotland)	Hefin O'Hare	5(12)	2	0	(3)	0	0	5(15)	10
WG	(Scotland)	Dave McCall	2(1)	1	0	3	0	0	5(1)	5
WG	(Scotland)	Colin Shaw	7(4)	2	0	1(1)	0	0	8(5)	10
WG	(Canada)	D. T. H. van der Merwe	10(1)	4	0	3(1)	0	0	13(2)	20
FB	(Scotland)	Peter Murchie	6(2)	0	0	1(1)	0	0	7(3)	0
FB	(Argentina)	Bernardo Stortoni	19	4	0	6	1	0	25	25

== Staff movements ==
=== Coaches ===
==== Personnel in ====
- (Scotland) Stuart Yule - Head Strength and Conditioning Coach

== Player movements ==
=== Academy promotions ===
- (Scotland) Peter Horne
- (Scotland) Pat MacArthur

=== Player transfers ===
==== Out ====
(Scotland) Steve Swindall to (England) Rotherham Titans
(Scotland) Eric Milligan to (Scotland) Glasgow Hawks

== Competitions ==
=== Pre-season and friendlies ===
==== Match 1 ====
4 August 2009
8pm

Stade Rochelais (France)	11 - 20	(Scotland) Glasgow Warriors
Try: ? Pen: Romain Lacoste	Preview; Report; Report	Try: Hefin O'Hare; Chris Fusaro; Colin Shaw; Pen: Dan Parks x 2

Issoire
Attendance: 2000
Referee: Monsieur Hadj-Bachir (Auvergne)

Stade Rochelais:
Replacements:
Glasgow Warriors: Bernardo Stortoni; Chris Kinloch, Dave McCall, Rob Dewey, Hefin O"Hare; Dan Parks CAPTAIN, Colin Gregor; Kevin Tkachuk, Pat MacArthur, Hamish Mitchell, Tim Barker, Dan Turner, Calum Forrester, Paul Burke (Ayr), Richie Vernon
Replacements: Jon Welsh, Justin Va"a, Richie Gray, Chris Fusaro (Heriot's), Mark McMillan, Ruaridh Jackson, Peter Horne, Peter Murchie, Colin Shaw

==== Match 2 ====
7 August 2009
8pm

Clermont (France)	12 - 0	(Scotland) Glasgow Warriors
Try: Vincent Debaty; Aurélien Rougerie; Con: Brock James	Preview; Report; Report

Issoire

Clermont: Anthony Floch; Aur_lien Rougerie CAPTAIN, Wesley Fofana, Gonzalo Canale, Napolioni Nalaga, Brock James, Morgan Parra, Davit Zirakashvili, Beno_t Cabello, Vincent Debaty, Jamie Cudmore, Thibaut Privat, Jason White, Alexandre Audebert, Elvis Vermeulen
Replacements: Willie Wepener, Martin Scelzo, Thomas Domingo, Lionel Faure, Julien Pierre, Christophe Samson, Julien Bardy, Kevin Senio, Ludovic Radosavljevic, Brent Russel, J_r_mie Malzieu
Glasgow Warriors: Bernardo Stortoni; Rob Dewey, Peter Murchie, Peter Horne, Colin Shaw; Ruaridh Jackson, Mark McMillan; Justin Va"a, Dougie Hall, Hamish Mitchell, Richie Gray, Dan Turner, Calum Forrester, Chris Fusaro (Heriot's)*, Johnnie Beattie
Replacements (all used): Pat MacArthur, Kevin Tkachuk, Jon Welsh, Tim Barker, Richie Vernon, Paul Burke (Ayr), Colin Gregor, Dan Parks, Dave McCall, Hefin O"Hare, Chris Kinloch

==== Match 3 ====
21 August 2009
7.30pm

Doncaster Knights (England)	3 - 40	(Scotland) Glasgow Warriors
Pen: Ali Warnock	Preview; Report; Report	Try: Peter Horne; Mark McMillan; Dave McCall; Thom Evans; Graeme Morrison; Ruaridh Jackson; Con: Dan Parks x 2 Ruaridh Jackson x 3

Castle Park
Attendance: 2,654

Doncaster Knights:
Replacements:
Glasgow Warriors: Bernardo Stortoni; Rob Dewey, Peter Murchie, Peter Horne, Colin Shaw; Dan Parks, Mark McMillan; Justin Va"a, Pat MacArthur, Hamish Mitchell, Tim Barker, Dan Turner, Calum Forrester, John Barclay, Johnnie Beattie
Replacements: Ed Kalman, Kevin Tkachuk, Jon Welsh, Dougie Hall, Alastair Kellock, Kelly Brown, Richie Vernon, Chris Cusiter, Colin Gregor, Ruaridh Jackson, Dave McCall, Graeme Morrison, Thom Evans, Hefin O"Hare, Chris Kinloch

==== Match 4 ====
28 August 2009
7.30pm

Glasgow Warriors (Scotland)	16 - 15	(England) Wasps
Try: Rob Dewey; Con: Ruaridh Jackson; Pen: Ruaridh Jackson; Dan Parks x 2	Preview; Report; Report	Try: Tom Varndell x 2 Con: Dave Walder

Firhill Stadium
Attendance: 2,252
Referee: Graham Knox (Greenock Wanderers/SRU)

Glasgow Warriors: Bernardo Stortoni; Rob Dewey, Peter Murchie, Graeme Morrison, Thom Evans; Ruaridh Jackson, Mark McMillan; Jon Welsh, Dougie Hall, Moray Low, Tim Barker, Alastair Kellock CAPTAIN, Kelly Brown, John Barclay, Richie Vernon
Replacements (all used): Pat MacArthur, Ed Kalman, Hamish Mitchell, Kevin Tkachuk, Dan Turner, Calum Forrester, Johnnie Beattie, Chris Cusiter, Dan Parks, Peter Horne, Colin Shaw, Hefin O'Hare
Wasps: Mark Van Gisbergen; Tom Varndell, Dominic Waldouck, Ben Jacobs, David Lemi; Danny Cipriani, Joe Simpson; Tim Payne, Rob Webber, Gabriel Bocca, Marty Veale, Richard Birkett, John Hart, Serge Betsen CAPTAIN, Dan Ward-Smith
Replacements: Tom Lindsay, Ben Broster, Dan Leo, Harry Ellis, Warren Fury, Dave Walder, Lachlan Mitchell, Tom French, Will Matthews, Christian Wade, Arthur Ellis

=== European Champions Cup ===
==== Pool 2 ====
Team	P	W	D	L	Tries for	Tries against	Try diff	Points for	Points against	Points diff	TB	LB	Pts
(France) Biarritz (2)	6	5	0	1	19	8	11	188	97	91	3	0	23
(England) Gloucester [6]	6	4	0	2	12	12	0	119	129	−10	1	0	17
(Scotland) Glasgow Warriors	6	2	0	4	9	14	−5	120	140	−20	0	1	9
(Wales) Newport Gwent Dragons	6	1	0	5	12	18	−6	108	169	−61	0	2	6

==== Results ====
===== Round 1 =====
10 October 2009
15:45

Glasgow Warriors (Scotland)	18 – 22	(France) Biarritz
Pen: Parks (5/6) 5', 9', 16', 27', 42'; Drop: Parks 58'	Report	Try: Lund 49' c< Con: Yachvili (1/1); Pen: Yachvili (3/4) 19', 30', 65'; Drop: Traille 22'; Bosch 40'

Firhill Arena, Glasgow
Attendance: 3,111
Referee: Wayne Barnes (England)

===== Round 2 =====
16 October 2009
19:30

Newport Gwent Dragons (Wales)	22 – 14	(Scotland) Glasgow Warriors
Try: A. Jones 12' c Charteris 38' m M. Thomas 40' c Con: Arlidge (2/3); Drop: Arlidge (1/1) 37'	Report	Try: Beattie 24' c Tkachuk 55' c Con: Parks (2/2)

Rodney Parade, Newport
Attendance: 6,119
Referee: Romain Poite (France)

===== Round 3 =====
11 December 2009
19:30

Glasgow Warriors (Scotland)	33 – 11	(England) Gloucester
Try: M. Evans 33' m Stortoni 37' c Con: Parks (1/2); Pen: Parks (7/8) 3', 7', 14', 21', 26', 44', 75'	Report	Try: Sharples 23' m Pen: Robinson (2/2) 11', 16'

Firhill Arena, Glasgow
Attendance: 4,462
Referee: Christophe Berdos (France)

===== Round 4 =====
20 December 2009
12:45

Gloucester (England)	19 – 6	(Scotland) Glasgow Warriors
Try: Sharples 57' m Brown 70' m Pen: Robinson (3/3) 42', 51', 65'	Report	Pen: Parks (1/2) 13'; Drop: Parks (1/1) 26'

Kingsholm, Gloucester
Attendance: 10,342
Referee: Jérôme Garces (France)

===== Round 5 =====
15 January 2010
19:30

Glasgow Warriors (Scotland)	29 – 25	(Wales) Newport Gwent Dragons
Try: Dewey 1' c Beattie 3' m Thomson 63' m Con: Jackson (1/2); Pen: Jackson (3/3) 10', 30', 37; Gregor (1/1) 19'	Report	Try: Sidoli 5' m Harris 24' c Gomer-Davies 34' c Con: Connor (1/2); Tovey (1/1); Pen: Connor (1/1) 50'; Arlidge (1/1) 61'

Firhill Arena, Glasgow
Attendance: 2,626
Referee: Peter Fitzgibbon (Ireland)

===== Round 6 =====
24 January 2010
13:45

Biarritz (France)	41 - 20	(Scotland) Glasgow Warriors
Try: Coetzee 36' m Ngwenys 64' c Penalty try 68' c Bolakoro 79' c Con: Courrent (3/4); Pen: Courrent (5/7) 3', 28', 52', 56', 62'	Report	Try: T. Evans 10' c Cusiter 49' c Con: Parks (2/2); Pen: Parks (2/3) 22', 24'

Parc des Sports Aguiléra, Biarritz
Attendance: 8,000
Referee: Dave Pearson (England)

=== Magners Celtic League ===
==== league table ====
	Team	Pld	W	D	L	PF	PA	PD	TF	TA	Try bonus	Losing bonus	Pts
1	(Ireland) Leinster	18	13	0	5	359	295	+64	27	29	1	2	55
2	(Wales) Ospreys	18	11	1	6	384	298	+86	37	26	3	3	52
3	(Scotland) Glasgow Warriors	18	11	2	5	390	321	+69	31	24	2	1	51
4	(Ireland) Munster	18	9	0	9	319	282	+37	33	20	3	6	45
5	(Wales) Cardiff Blues	18	10	0	8	349	315	+34	33	28	2	2	44
6	(Scotland) Edinburgh	18	8	0	10	385	391	−6	40	40	4	5	41
7	(Wales) Newport Gwent Dragons	18	8	1	9	333	378	−45	32	37	3	2	39
8	(Ireland) Ulster	18	7	1	10	357	370	−13	39	35	4	2	36
9	(Wales) Scarlets	18	5	0	13	361	382	−21	35	35	1	8	29
10	(Ireland) Connacht	18	5	1	12	254	459	−205	20	53	0	4	26
Under the standard bonus point system, points are awarded as follows: 4 points for a win; 2 points for a draw; 1 bonus point for scoring 4 tries (or more) (Try bonus); 1 bonus point for losing by 7 points (or fewer) (Losing bonus)
Green background (rows 1 to 4) are play-off places. Source: RaboDirect PRO12

==== Results ====
===== Round 1 =====
4 September 2009
20:00

Glasgow Warriors (Scotland)	22 – 9	(Ireland) Munster
	Report

Firhill Stadium
Attendance: 3,694
Referee: James Jones

===== Round 2 =====
13 September 2009
17:05

Glasgow Warriors (Scotland)	19 – 11	(Wales) Scarlets
	Report

Firhill Stadium
Attendance: 2,582
Referee: John Lacey

===== Round 3 =====
18 September 2009
19:30

Newport Gwent Dragons (Wales)	30 – 19	(Scotland) Glasgow Warriors
	Report

Rodney Parade
Attendance: 5,219
Referee: Dudley Phillips

===== Round 4 =====
25 September 2009
19:05

Glasgow Warriors (Scotland)	16 – 26	(Wales) Ospreys
	Report

Firhill Stadium
Attendance: 3,108
Referee: Simon McDowell

===== Round 5 =====
3 October 2009
18:30

Cardiff Blues (Wales)	5 – 21	(Scotland) Glasgow Warriors
	Report

Cardiff City Stadium
Attendance: 9,185
Referee: George Clancy

===== Round 6 =====
23 October 2009
19:30

Glasgow Warriors (Scotland)	34 – 20	(Ireland) Connacht
	Report

Firhill Stadium
Attendance: 2,887
Referee: Tim Hayes

===== Round 7 =====
30 October 2009
19:05

Ospreys (Wales)	9 – 9	(Scotland) Glasgow Warriors
	Report

Liberty Stadium
Attendance: 6,661
Referee: Peter Fitzgibbon

===== Round 8 =====
4 December 2009
20:00

Ulster (Ireland)	13 – 25	(Scotland) Glasgow Warriors
	Report; Report

Ravenhill
Attendance: 8,761
Referee: James Jones

===== Round 9: 1872 Cup (1st Leg) =====
27 December 2009
15:05

Glasgow Warriors (Scotland)	25 – 12	(Scotland) Edinburgh
	Report

Firhill Stadium
Attendance: 8,830
Referee: Neil Paterson (SRU)

===== Round 10: 1872 Cup (2nd Leg) =====
2 January 2010
15:05

Edinburgh (Scotland)	15 – 22	(Scotland) Glasgow Warriors
	Report

Murrayfield
Attendance: 11,785
Referee: Peter Allan (SRU)

Glasgow Warriors won the 1872 Cup with an aggregate score of 47 - 27.

===== Round 11 =====
18 March 2010
19:30

Leinster (Ireland)	20 – 14	(Scotland) Glasgow Warriors
	Report

RDS Arena
Attendance: 11,840
Referee: Nigel Owens

===== Round 12 =====
19 February 2010
19:30

Glasgow Warriors (Scotland)	7 – 30	(Wales) Cardiff Blues
	Report

Firhill Stadium
Attendance: 2,754
Referee: Dudley Phillips

===== Round 13 =====
5 March 2010
20:00

Connacht (Ireland)	19 – 19	(Scotland) Glasgow Warriors
	Report

Sportsgrounds
Attendance: 1,412
Referee: James Jones

===== Round 14 =====
26 March 2010
20:00

Munster (Ireland)	27 – 19	(Scotland) Glasgow Warriors
	Report

Thomond Park
Attendance: 23,814
Referee: James Jones

===== Round 15 =====
4 April 2010
15:05

Glasgow Warriors (Scotland)	27 – 19	(Wales) Newport Gwent Dragons
	Report

Firhill Stadium
Attendance: 2,621
Referee: Alan Lewis

===== Round 16 =====
16 April 2010
19:05

Glasgow Warriors (Scotland)	25 – 18	(Ireland) Ulster
	Report

Firhill Stadium
Attendance: 3,766
Referee: Tim Hayes

===== Round 17 =====
23 April 2010
20:00

Glasgow Warriors (Scotland)	30 – 6	(Ireland) Leinster
	Report; Report

Firhill Stadium
Attendance: 4,638
Referee: James Jones

===== Round 18 =====
7 May 2010
19:05

Scarlets (Wales)	32 – 37	(Scotland) Glasgow Warriors
	Report

Parc y Scarlets
Attendance: 5,630
Referee: James Jones

==== Play-offs ====
===== Semi-finals =====
14 May 2010
19:05

Ospreys (Wales)	20 – 5	(Scotland) Glasgow Warriors
Try: Williams 9' c Hook 54' c Con: Biggar (2/2); Pen: Biggar (2) 51', 79'	Report	Try: Thomson 42' m

Liberty Stadium
Attendance: 7,079
Referee: George Clancy

== End of Season awards ==
Award	Winner
Players' Player of the Season	(Scotland) Dan Parks
Try of the Season	(Scotland) Hefin O'Hare vs. (Ireland) Leinster
Breakthrough Player of the Season	(Scotland) Jon Welsh

== Competitive debuts this season ==
A player's nationality shown is taken from the nationality at the highest honour for the national side obtained; or if never capped internationally their place of birth. Senior caps take precedence over junior caps or place of birth; junior caps take precedence over place of birth. A player's nationality at debut may be different from the nationality shown. Combination sides like the British and Irish Lions or Pacific Islanders are not national sides, or nationalities.

Players in BOLD font have been capped by their senior international XV side as nationality shown.

Players in Italic font have capped either by their international 7s side; or by the international XV 'A' side as nationality shown.

Players in normal font have not been capped at senior level.

A position in parentheses indicates that the player debuted as a substitute. A player may have made a prior debut for Glasgow Warriors in a non-competitive match, 'A' match or 7s match; these matches are not listed.

Tournaments where competitive debut made:

**Scottish Inter-District Championship**	**Welsh–Scottish League**	**WRU Challenge Cup**	**Celtic League**	**Celtic Cup**	**1872 Cup**	**Pro12**	**Pro14**	**Rainbow Cup**	**United Rugby Championship**	**European Challenge Cup**	**Heineken Cup / European Champions Cup**

Crosshatching indicates a jointly hosted match.

Number	Player nationality	Name	Position	Date of debut	Venue	Stadium	Opposition nationality	Opposition side	Tournament	Match result	Scoring debut
174	(Scotland)	**Peter Murchie**	Centre	2009-09-04	Home	Firhill Stadium	(Ireland)	Munster	Celtic League	Win	Nil
175	(Scotland)	**Rob Dewey**	Wing	2009-09-04	Home	Firhill Stadium	(Ireland)	Munster	Celtic League	Win	Nil
176	(Scotland)	Dave McCall	Centre	2009-09-25	Home	Firhill Stadium	(Wales)	Ospreys	Celtic League	Loss	5 pts
177	(Canada)	**D. T. H. van der Merwe**	(Wing)	2009-10-03	Away	Cardiff City Stadium	(Wales)	Cardiff Blues	Celtic League	Win	Nil
178	(Scotland)	**Alex Dunbar**	Wing	2009-12-04	Away	Ravenhill Stadium	(Ireland)	Ulster	Celtic League	Win	Nil
179	(Scotland)	**Chris Fusaro**	Flanker	2010-02-19	Home	Firhill Stadium	(Wales)	Cardiff Blues	Celtic League	Loss	Nil
180	(Scotland)	Paul Burke	(Flanker)	2010-02-19	Home	Firhill Stadium	(Wales)	Cardiff Blues	Celtic League	Loss	Nil
181	(Scotland)	**Duncan Weir**	(Fly half)	2010-04-23	Home	Firhill Stadium	(Ireland)	Leinster	Celtic League	Win	Nil

== Sponsorship ==
=== Official kit supplier ===
Canterbury - Official kit supplier
