= 2008–09 Glasgow Warriors season =

Rugby union season

Glasgow Warriors 2008 / 2009
- Ground: Firhill Stadium (Capacity: 10,887)
- Coach: (Scotland) Sean Lineen
- Captain: (Scotland) Alastair Kellock
- Most caps: (Scotland) Moray Low (25)
- Top scorer: (Scotland) Dan Parks (157)
- Most tries: (Scotland) Thom Evans (12)
- League: Celtic League
- 7th
1st kit	2nd kit

The 2008–09 season saw Glasgow Warriors compete in the competitions: the Magners Celtic League and the European Champions Cup, the Heineken Cup.

== Team ==
=== Squad ===
Hookers (Scotland) Dougie Hall (Scotland) Eric Milligan (Scotland) Fergus Thomson Props (Scotland) Ed Kalman (Scotland) Moray Low (Canada) Kevin Tkachuk (Samoa) Justin Va'a (Scotland) Jon Welsh Locks (Ireland) Tim Barker (Scotland) Richie Gray (Scotland) Alastair Kellock (Samoa) Opeta Palepoi (Scotland) Dan Turner	Loose forwards (Scotland) John Barclay (Scotland) Johnnie Beattie (Scotland) Kelly Brown (Scotland) James Eddie (Scotland) Donnie Macfadyen (Scotland) Steve Swindall (Scotland) Richie Vernon Scrum halves (Scotland) Colin Gregor (Scotland) Mark McMillan (Scotland) Sam Pinder Fly halves (Scotland) Mike Adamson (Scotland) Ruaridh Jackson (Scotland) Dan Parks	Centres (Scotland) Max Evans (New Zealand) Daryl Gibson (Scotland) Andrew Henderson (Scotland) Graeme Morrison Back Three (Scotland) Thom Evans (Samoa) Lome Fa'atau (Scotland) Hefin O'Hare (Argentina) José María Núñez Piossek (Argentina) Bernardo Stortoni (Scotland) Colin Shaw

==== Academy players ====
- (Scotland) Pat MacArthur - Hooker
- (Scotland) Joe Stafford - Prop
- (Scotland) Richie Gray - Lock
- (Scotland) Rob Harley - Lock
- (Scotland) Neale Patrick - Lock
- (Scotland) Chris Fusaro - Flanker
- (Scotland) Peter Jericevich - Scrum-half
- (Scotland) Jamie Hunter - Fly-half
- (Scotland) Alex Dunbar - Centre
- (Scotland) Scott Forrest - Centre
- (Scotland) Steven Wilson - Centre
- (Scotland) Chris Kinloch - Wing
- (Scotland) Grant Anderson - Full back
- (Scotland) Peter Horne - Full back

==== Back up players ====
Other players used by Glasgow Warriors over the course of the season.

- (Scotland) Greg Francis (Glasgow Hawks) – Flanker
- (Scotland) Dave Whiteford (Melrose) – Centre

== Player statistics ==
During the 2008–09 season, Glasgow have used 36 different players in competitive games. The table below shows the number of appearances and points scored by each player.

Position	Nation	Name	Celtic League			Champions Cup			Total	
Position	Nation	Name	Apps (sub)	Tries	Points kicked	Apps (sub)	Tries	Points kicked	Apps (sub)	Total pts
HK	(Scotland)	Dougie Hall	11(3)	1	0	5	0	0	16(3)	5
HK	(Scotland)	Pat MacArthur	1(2)	0	0	0	0	0	1(2)	0
HK	(Scotland)	Eric Milligan	2(4)	0	0	(2)	0	0	2(6)	0
HK	(Scotland)	Fergus Thomson	4(4)	0	0	1(1)	0	0	5(5)	0
PR	(Scotland)	Ed Kalman	3(5)	0	0	2(3)	0	0	5(8)	0
PR	(Scotland)	Moray Low	15(3)	2	0	4(2)	0	0	19(5)	10
PR	(Samoa)	Justin Va'a	11(2)	0	0	4	0	0	15(2)	0
PR	(Canada)	Kevin Tkachuk	6(8)	0	0	2(1)	0	0	8(9)	0
PR	(Scotland)	Jon Welsh	1(1)	0	0	0	0	0	1(1)	0
LK	(Ireland)	Tim Barker	8(4)	0	0	2(2)	0	0	10(6)	0
LK	(Scotland)	Richie Gray	1(2)	0	0	4(1)	0	0	1(2)	0
LK	(Scotland)	Alastair Kellock	17	0	0	4	1	0	21	5
LK	(Samoa)	Opeta Palepoi	6(3)	0	0	2(1)	0	0	8(4)	0
LK	(Scotland)	Dan Turner	5(10)	0	0	3(3)	0	0	11(11)	0
BR	(Scotland)	John Barclay	12	3	0	5	0	0	17	15
BR	(Scotland)	Johnnie Beattie	10(1)	0	0	5(1)	0	0	15(2)	0
BR	(Scotland)	Kelly Brown	18	2	0	5(1)	1	0	23(1)	15
BR	(Scotland)	James Eddie	6(2)	0	0	1	0	0	7(2)	0
BR	(Scotland)	Calum Forrester	5(4)	0	0	1(1)	0	0	6(5)	0
BR	(Scotland)	Steve Swindall	2(5)	0	0	(2)	0	0	2(7)	0
BR	(Scotland)	Richie Vernon	(4)	0	0	1(4)	0	0	1(8)	0
SH	(Scotland)	Colin Gregor	5(9)	1	35	5(1)	1	19	10(10)	64
SH	(Scotland)	Mark McMillan	14(1)	1	0	2(1)	0	0	16(2)	0
SH	(Scotland)	Sam Pinder	2(2)	0	0	(2)	0	0	2(4)	0
FH	(Scotland)	Ruaridh Jackson	8(8)	1	14	2(3)	2	5	10(11)	34
FH	(Scotland)	Dan Parks	12(2)	0	117	3	0	40	15(2)	157
CE	(Scotland)	Max Evans	14	3	0	6	2	0	20	25
CE	(Scotland)	Andrew Henderson	3(5)	0	0	2(3)	0	0	5(8)	0
CE	(Scotland)	Chris Kinloch	1	0	0	0	0	0	1	0
CE	(Scotland)	Graeme Morrison	13(1)	1	0	4	1	0	17(1)	10
WG	(Scotland)	Thom Evans	14	9	0	4	3	0	18	60
WG	(Samoa)	Lome Fa'atau	12	5	0	4	2	0	16	35
WG	(Argentina)	José María Núñez Piossek	2(2)	0	0	2(2)	0	0	4(4)	0
WG	(Scotland)	Hefin O'Hare	7(6)	3	0	2(3)	1	0	9(9)	20
WG	(Scotland)	Colin Shaw	3(1)	2	0	0	0	0	3(1)	10
FB	(Argentina)	Bernardo Stortoni	16(1)	2	0	6	0	0	22(1)	10

== Player movements ==
=== Academy promotions ===
- (Scotland) Chris Kinloch
- (Scotland) Richie Gray
- (Scotland) Ruaridh Jackson
- (Scotland) Calum Forrester

== Competitions ==
=== Pre-season and friendlies ===
==== Match 1 ====
2 August 2008
7pm

Castres Olympique (France)	21 - 26	(Scotland) Glasgow Warriors
	Preview; Report; Report; Report	Try: Chris Kinloch; Daryl Gibson; Hefin O'Hare; Mark McMillan; Con: Colin Gregor x 3

Stade Municipal, Millau
Attendance: 1500

Castres:
Replacements:
Glasgow Warriors: Colin Shaw; Lome Fa'atau, Hefin O'Hare, Daryl Gibson, Chris Kinloch (Edinburgh Accies); Colin Gregor, Sam Pinder;
Justin Va'a, Eric Milligan, Ed Kalman, Al Kellock [Capt], Opeta Palepoi, Dan Turner, Calum Forrester, Richie Vernon
Replacements (all used): Kevin Tkachuk, Pat MacArthur (Ayr), Jon Welsh, Greg Francis (Glasgow Hawks), Johnnie Beattie, Mark McMillan,
Ruaridh Jackson, Andrew Henderson, Max Evans, David Whiteford (Melrose)

==== Match 2 ====
9 August 2008
4pm

Beziers (France)	14 - 36	(Scotland) Glasgow Warriors
	Preview [ Report] Report [ Report]	Try: Chris Kinloch; Thom Evans; Lome Fa'atau; Max Evans; Ruaridh Jackson; Con: Colin Gregor x 3 Ruaridh Jackson; Pen: Colin Gregor

Stade Municipal, Camares
Attendance: 3000

Béziers:
Replacements
Glasgow Warriors: Colin Shaw; Thom Evans, Hefin O'Hare, Andy Henderson, Chris Kinloch; Colin Gregor, Mark McMillan; Kevin Tkachuk, Dougie Hall, Moray Low, Opeta Palepoi, Alastair Kellock (Captain), Dan Turner, Calum Forrester, Richie Vernon
Replacements (all used): Eric Milligan, Pat Macarthur, Jon Welsh, Justin Va'a, Johnnie Beattie, Kelly Brown, Sam Pinder, Ruaridh Jackson, Max Evans, Lome Fa'atau, David Whiteford

Winning both matches against the French opposition meant that Glasgow Warriors won the 2008 XV Challenge Vacquerin trophy.

==== Match 3 ====
22 August 2008
7.30pm

Glasgow Warriors (Scotland)	12 - 15	(England) Bristol
Try: Lome Fa'atau; Richie Vernon; Con: Dan Parks	Preview; Report; Report	Pen: Adrian Jarvis x 5

Firhill Stadium
Attendance: 1572
Referee: Dave Pearson (RFU)

Glasgow Warriors: R Jackson; L Fa'atau, M Evans, A Henderson, T Evans; D Parks, M McMillan; E Kalman, D Hall, M Low, O Palepoi, D Turner, K Brown, R Vernon, J Barclay
Replacements: A Kellock for Palepoi 25mins, J Beattie for Vernon 40, E Milligan for Hall, C Gregor for McMillan, both 52, G Strain for Kalman 58, D Gibson for Henderson, C Forrester for Brown, R Gray for Turner, H O'Hare for Fa'atau, McMillan for Parks, all 64, Vernon for Barclay 71, Kalman for Low 75
Bristol: L Arscott; T Arscott, J Fatialofa, K Maggs, A Elliot; A Jarvis, G Beveridge; A Clarke, D Blaney, J Hobson, R Winters, R Sidoli, A Blowers, D Ward-Smith, J El-Abd
Replacements: N Budgett for Winters, M Sambucetti for Sidol, R Pennycook for Blowers, all 63, V Lilo for Fatialofa 65

==== Match 4 ====
30 August 2008
2pm

Gloucester (England)	30 - 8	(Scotland) Glasgow Warriors
Try: Anthony Allen; Rory Lawson; Olly Morgan; Con: Ryan Lamb x 3 Pen: Ryan Lamb x 3	Preview; Report; Report; Report	Try: Lome Fa'atau; Pen: Dan Parks

Kingsholm Stadium
Attendance: 8000
Referee: Tim Hayes

Gloucester: O Morgan; I Balshaw, M Tindall (capt), A Allen, L Vainikolo, R Lamb, G Cooper; N Wood, A Titterrell, C Nieto, W James, A Brown, P Buxton, L Narraway, Andy Hazell
Replacements: O Azam, D Young, M Bortolami, A Strokosch, R Lawson, W Walker, M Watkins, J Simpson-Daniel
Glasgow Warriors: Kevin Tkachuk, Dougie Hall, Moray Low, Alastair Kellock, Dan Turner, Kelly Brown, John Barclay, Richie Vernon,
Mark McMillan, Dan Parks, Thom Evans, Graeme Morrison, Max Evans, Lome Fa'atau, Bernardo Stortoni
Replacements: Eric Milligan, Justin Va'a, Ed Kalman, Tim Barker, Andrew Henderson, Ruaridh Jackson, Steve Swindall, Calum Forrester,
Colin Gregor, Hefin O'Hare

=== European Champions Cup ===
==== Pool 5 ====
Team	P	W	D	L	Tries for	Tries against	Try diff	Points for	Points against	Points diff	TB	LB	Pts
(England) Bath (5)	6	4	1	1	13	8	5	107	92	15	2	1	21
(France) Toulouse (8)	6	4	1	1	12	8	4	121	88	33	1	1	20
(Scotland) Glasgow	6	2	0	4	14	17	−3	134	150	−16	1	3	12
(Wales) Newport Gwent Dragons	6	1	0	5	8	14	−6	83	115	−32	0	3	7

==== Results ====
===== Round 1 =====
11 October 2008
14:30

Newport Gwent Dragons (Wales)	32 – 22	(Scotland) Glasgow Warriors
Tries: G. Wyatt 38' m, 57' m C. Charvis 62' c Conv: J. Arlidge (1/3); Pen: J. Arlidge (3) 22', 28', 43'; Drop: J. Arlidge (2) 40', 73'	Report	Tries: L. Fa'atau 5' c M. Evans 53' c A. Kellock 65' m Conv: Colin Gregor (2/3); Pen: Colin Gregor (1) 19'

Rodney Parade, Newport
Attendance: 5,238

===== Round 2 =====
17 October 2008
20:00

Glasgow Warriors (Scotland)	16 – 22	(France) Toulouse
Tries: L. Fa'atau 76' c Conv: D. Parks (1/1); Pen: D. Parks (3) 5', 15', 31'	Report	Tries: D. Skrela 26' c B. Kelleher 45' m Y. Jauzion 51' c Conv: D. Skrela (2/3); Drop: M. Kunavore (1) 42'

Firhill Stadium, Glasgow
Attendance: 4,820
Referee: Alan Lewis

===== Round 3 =====
7 December 2008
12:00

Bath Rugby (England)	35 – 31	(Scotland) Glasgow Warriors
Tries: A. Beattie 33' m M. Stephenson (2) 44' c, 58' c S. Berne 61' c Conv: Butch James (3/4); Pen: Butch James (3) 16', 38', 49'	Report	Tries: T. Evans (3) 6' c, 35', 52' m H. O'Hare 72' m R. Jackson 74' c Conv: Colin Gregor (3/5)

Recreation Ground, Bath
Attendance: 10,600

===== Round 4 =====
14 December 2008
14:00

Glasgow Warriors (Scotland)	19 – 25	(England) Bath
Tries: Colin Gregor 20' c Conv: D. Parks (1/1); Pen: D. Parks (3/3) 5', 20', 51'; R. Jackson (1/1) 66'	Report	Tries: M. Banahan (2) 9' m, 58' m S. Berne 48' m J. Maddock 74' c Conv: Butch James (1/4); Pen: Butch James (2/2) 2', 75'

Firhill Stadium, Glasgow
Attendance: 3,306

===== Round 5 =====
17 January 2009
14:35

Toulouse (France)	26 – 33	(Scotland) Glasgow Warriors
Tries: Penalty try 72' c V. Clerc 75' c Conv: Y. Jauzion (1/1); G. du Toit (1/1); Pen: J. Élissalde (3/3) 17', 46', 54'; G. du Toit (1/2) 80'+1'	Report	Tries: G. Morrison 12' c K. Brown 26' c Max Evans 69' c Conv: D. Parks (3/3); Pen: D. Parks (3/6) 10', 15', 67'; Drop: D. Parks (1/1) 38'

Stade Municipal, Toulouse
Attendance: 18,720

===== Round 6 =====
25 January 2009
15:00

Glasgow Warriors (Scotland)	13 – 10	(Wales) Newport Gwent Dragons
Try: R. Jackson 46' c Conv: Colin Gregor (1/1); Pen: Colin Gregor (2/4) 5', 10'	Report	Try: T. Willis 32' c Conv: J. Arlidge (1/1); Pen: J. Arlidge (0/2); S. Connor (1/1) 69'

Firhill Stadium, Glasgow
Attendance: 2,300

=== Magners Celtic League ===
==== League table ====
	Team	Pld	W	D	L	PF	PA	PD	TF	TA	Try bonus	Losing bonus	Pts
1	(Ireland) Munster	18	14	0	4	405	257	+148	49	23	6	1	63
2	(Scotland) Edinburgh	18	11	0	7	416	296	+120	40	30	6	5	55
3	(Ireland) Leinster	18	11	1	6	401	270	+131	38	20	4	2	52
4	(Wales) Ospreys	18	11	0	7	397	319	+78	39	28	3	5	52
5	(Wales) Scarlets	18	9	0	9	376	395	−19	41	46	3	1	40
6	(Wales) Cardiff Blues	18	8	1	9	322	361	−39	31	36	2	2	38
7	(Scotland) Glasgow Warriors	18	7	0	11	349	375	−26	36	41	4	5	37
8	(Ireland) Ulster	18	7	0	11	298	331	−33	30	33	2	6	36
9	(Wales) Newport Gwent Dragons	18	7	0	11	305	429	−124	26	39	1	4	33
10	(Ireland) Connacht	18	4	0	14	224	460	−236	20	54	1	3	20
Under the standard bonus point system, points are awarded as follows: 4 points for a win; 2 points for a draw; 1 bonus point for scoring 4 tries (or more) (Try bonus); 1 bonus point for losing by 7 points (or fewer) (Losing bonus)
Source: RaboDirect PRO12

==== Results ====
The all-Welsh fixtures were played mid-week to allow their teams to compete in the Anglo-Welsh Cup.

===== Round 1 =====
5 September 2008
19:05

Newport Gwent Dragons (Wales)	6–12	(Scotland) Glasgow Warriors
	Report; Report

Rodney Parade
Attendance: 4,113

===== Round 2 =====
12 September 2008
19:30

Glasgow Warriors (Scotland)	18–21	(Wales) Ospreys
	Report

Firhill Stadium
Attendance: 2,651

===== Round 3 =====
19 September 2008
18:30

Connacht (Ireland)	15–8	(Scotland) Glasgow Warriors
	Report

Sportsground
Attendance: 1,252

===== Round 4 =====
26 September 2008
19:30

Glasgow Warriors (Scotland)	34–20	(Wales) Scarlets
	Report

Firhill Stadium
Attendance: 2,450

===== Round 5 =====
4 October 2008
19:00

Munster (Ireland)	25–17	(Scotland) Glasgow Warriors
	Report

Thomond Park Stadium
Attendance: 22,885

===== Round 6 =====
24 October 2008
19:30

Glasgow Warriors (Scotland)	15–12	(Ireland) Leinster
	Report

Firhill Stadium
Attendance: 2,523

===== Round 7 =====
28 November 2008
19:30

Glasgow Warriors (Scotland)	28–0	(Wales) Cardiff Blues
	Report

Firhill Stadium
Attendance: 2,364

===== Round 8: 1872 Cup (1st Leg) =====
26 December 2008
19:30

Edinburgh (Scotland)	39–6	(Scotland) Glasgow Warriors
	Report

Murrayfield
Attendance: 12,534
Referee: Neil Paterson (SRU)

===== Round 9: 1872 Cup (2nd Leg) =====
2 January 2009
15:00

Glasgow Warriors (Scotland)	25–20	(Scotland) Edinburgh
	Report

Firhill Stadium
Attendance: 6,665
Referee: Rob Debney (RFU)

Edinburgh Rugby won the 1872 Cup with an aggregate score of 59 - 31.

===== Round 10 =====
9 January 2009
19:30

Glasgow Warriors (Scotland)	20–25	(Wales) Newport Gwent Dragons
	Report

Firhill Stadium
Attendance: 2,217

===== Round 11 =====
20 February 2009
19:05

Cardiff Blues (Wales)	34–30	(Scotland) Glasgow Warriors
	Report

Cardiff City Stadium
Attendance: 7,603

===== Round 12 =====
7 March 2009
19:30

Ulster (Ireland)	12–0	(Scotland) Glasgow Warriors
	Report

Ravenhill
Attendance: 8,286

===== Round 13 =====
27 March 2009
19:45

Glasgow Warriors (Scotland)	13–26	(Ireland) Munster
	Report

Firhill Stadium
Attendance: 3,615

===== Round 14 =====
4 April 2009
17:30

Scarlets (Wales)	21–38	(Scotland) Glasgow Warriors
	Report

Parc y Scarlets
Attendance: 6,103

===== Round 15 =====
17 April 2009
19:30

Glasgow Warriors (Scotland)	19–20	(Ireland) Ulster
	Report

Firhill Stadium
Attendance: 2,960

===== Round 16 =====
25 April 2009
19:35

Leinster (Ireland)	36–13	(Scotland) Glasgow Warriors
	Report

RDS Arena
Attendance: 10,910

===== Round 17 =====
10 May 2009
14:35

Ospreys (Wales)	34–23	(Scotland) Glasgow Warriors
	Report

Liberty Stadium
Attendance: 5,204

===== Round 18 =====
15 May 2009
19:45

Glasgow Warriors (Scotland)	30–9	(Ireland) Connacht
	Report

Firhill Stadium
Attendance: 1,851

== Competitive debuts this season ==
A player's nationality shown is taken from the nationality at the highest honour for the national side obtained; or if never capped internationally their place of birth. Senior caps take precedence over junior caps or place of birth; junior caps take precedence over place of birth. A player's nationality at debut may be different from the nationality shown. Combination sides like the British and Irish Lions or Pacific Islanders are not national sides, or nationalities.

Players in BOLD font have been capped by their senior international XV side as nationality shown.

Players in Italic font have capped either by their international 7s side; or by the international XV 'A' side as nationality shown.

Players in normal font have not been capped at senior level.

A position in parentheses indicates that the player debuted as a substitute. A player may have made a prior debut for Glasgow Warriors in a non-competitive match, 'A' match or 7s match; these matches are not listed.

Tournaments where competitive debut made:

**Scottish Inter-District Championship**	**Welsh–Scottish League**	**WRU Challenge Cup**	**Celtic League**	**Celtic Cup**	**1872 Cup**	**Pro12**	**Pro14**	**Rainbow Cup**	**United Rugby Championship**	**European Challenge Cup**	**Heineken Cup / European Champions Cup**

Crosshatching indicates a jointly hosted match.

Number	Player nationality	Name	Position	Date of debut	Venue	Stadium	Opposition nationality	Opposition side	Tournament	Match result	Scoring debut
169	(Argentina)	**José María Núñez Piossek**	(Wing)	2008-12-07	Away	Recreation Ground	(England)	Bath	European Champions Cup	Loss	Nil
170	(Scotland)	Chris Kinloch	Wing	2009-03-07	Away	Ravenhill Stadium	(Ireland)	Ulster	Celtic League	Loss	Nil
171	(Scotland)	**Richie Gray**	(Lock)	2009-03-07	Away	Ravenhill Stadium	(Ireland)	Ulster	Celtic League	Loss	Nil
172	(Scotland)	**Peter Horne**	(Centre)	2009-03-07	Away	Ravenhill Stadium	(Ireland)	Ulster	Celtic League	Loss	Nil
173	(Scotland)	**Jon Welsh**	Prop	2009-05-10	Away	Liberty Stadium	(Wales)	Ospreys	Celtic League	Loss	Nil

== Sponsorship ==
=== Official kit supplier ===
Canterbury - Official kit supplier
