= Paul Burke =

Paul Burke may refer to:

- Paul Burke (actor) (1926–2009), American actor in TV series Naked City (1960–63) and 12 O'Clock High
- Paul Burke (boxer) (born 1966), English professional lightweight and light welterweight boxer
- Paul Burke (rugby union, born 1973), English born Ireland international
- Paul Burke (rugby union, born 1982), Scottish rugby union player
- Bud Burke (Paul E. Burke Jr., 1934–2017), Kansas state legislator
