= Ally Maclay =

Hong Kong rugby union player (born 1984)

- Born: Ally Maclay; 2 March 1984 (age 42) Glasgow, Scotland
- Height: 1.91 m (6 ft 3 in)
- Weight: 105 kg (16 st 7 lb)

Rugby union career
- Position: Centre
Amateur team(s)
Years	Team	Apps	(Points)
1997	Glasgow Hawks		
- Stewart's Melville
- Glasgow Hawks
- Sydney University
- Valley RFC
2013-	Glasgow Hawks		
Senior career
Years	Team	Apps	(Points)
2004-05	Glasgow Warriors	0	(0)
International career
Years	Team	Apps	(Points)
- Scotland U16
- Scotland U18
- Scotland U19
- Scotland U21
2013-17	Hong Kong	5	(0)
National sevens team
Years	Team		Comps
- Hong Kong 7s

Ally Maclay (born 2 March 1984 in Glasgow, Scotland) is a Hong Kong international rugby union footballer. He plays at centre. He plays for Glasgow Hawks.

== Rugby Union career ==
=== Amateur career ===
Maclay started out playing with the Glasgow Hawks at midi level. He then played with Stewart's Melville, while he was a PE student at Edinburgh. He returned to Hawks and won the Championship and Cup double in 2003-04 season. He also played for Sydney University and in Hong Kong with Valley rugby club. Maclay came back to play with the Glasgow Hawks from 2013.

=== Professional career ===
Maclay was in the Glasgow Warriors back-up squad for the 2004-05 season. He played in the Warriors match against Newcastle Falcons on 20 September 2004 at Hughenden Stadium scoring a try in this match in a 26 - 21 victory for the Glasgow side.

Maclay was later to play against the Warriors when he played for Glasgow Hawks. In a friendly match on 20 March 2007, he scored a try against the Warriors in a 14-14 draw at Old Anniesland.

=== International career ===
Maclay came through the age-grades for Scotland playing at U16, U18, U19 and U21 grades. He moved to Hong Kong where he became eligible and represented both the Hong Kong national side and the Hong Kong 7s national side. He is now working in Bradbury School ESF Hong Kong

== Assault ==
Maclay was the victim of an assault which ended up in the Scottish court and made various newspaper headlines. A Halloween night-out with the Glasgow Hawks and Glasgow Warriors players in October 2013 ended in a takeaway restaurant.

Being Halloween, the rugby stars were in fancy dress. Maclay, dressed as Tweedledee, interjected in a dispute between fellow Hawks player Gavin Quinn and Warriors and Scotland international Ryan Wilson.

Wilson was fined £750 for assaulting both Quinn and Maclay by the Glasgow Sheriff Court.
