= Jamie Hunter =

Jamie Hunter may refer to:

- Jamie Hunter (rugby union) (born 1997), Scottish rugby union footballer
- Jamie Hunter (Bonanza), a character on the TV series Bonanza
- Jamie Hunter (River City), a character on the TV series River City
- Jamie Hunter (snooker player), English cue sports player
