= Mockford =

Mockford is a surname. Notable people with the surname include:

- Alex Mockford (born 1981), English rugby union player
- Ben Mockford (born 1989), English basketball player
- Harold Mockford (1932–2023), English painter
- Jeanne Mockford (1926–2018), English actress
- Maureen Mockford (c.1940–2008), Northern Irish badminton player and bowler
