= Alasdhair McFarlane =

Scottish rugby union player (born 1984)

- Born: Alasdhair McFarlane; 29 August 1984 (age 42) South Africa
- Height: 1.76 m (5 ft 9 in)
- Weight: 84 kg (13 st 3 lb)

Rugby union career
- Position: Scrum-Half
Amateur team(s)
Years	Team	Apps	(Points)
- Hillhead Jordanhill
–	Glasgow Hutchesons Aloysians		
–	Ayr		
Senior career
Years	Team	Apps	(Points)
2004-06	Glasgow Warriors	1	(0)
International career
Years	Team	Apps	(Points)
- Scotland U21
–	Scotland Club XV		

Alasdhair McFarlane (born 29 August 1984 in Scotland), is a former Scottish U21 and Scotland Club XV international rugby union player, formerly of Glasgow Warriors. McFarlane played at Scrum-Half.

== Amateur career ==
McFarlane played for Hillhead Jordanhill before moving on to play for Glasgow Hutchesons Aloysians. When he joined Glasgow Warriors he also played for Ayr.

== Professional career ==
He was with the Warriors in season 2004-05. He played against Sale Sharks on 20 August 2004. He made the squad away to Newport Gwent Dragons in January 2005; home to Ospreys that same month but did not play; and away to Munster Rugby in February 2005 where he came on a substitute for Graeme Beveridge in his competitive debut in the Celtic League.

In season 2005-06, McFarlane was again playing for Glasgow Warriors. He came on as sub in their match against Rotherham Titans.

He started the next Warriors match against Edinburgh Rugby.

He was named in the Warriors Heineken Cup squad for their campaign in Europe that season.

== International career ==
McFarlane played for the Scotland Under 21 side, playing in the Under 21 World Cup for Scotland.

He was later capped for Scotland Club XV.
