= Grant Anderson (rugby union, born August 1989) =

Scottish rugby union player

- Born: Grant Anderson; 12 August 1989 (age 37) Gourock, Scotland
- Height: 5 ft 10 in (1.78 m)
- Weight: 90 kg (14 st 2 lb; 200 lb)

Rugby union career
- Position: Full Back
Amateur team(s)
| Years | Team | Apps | (Points) |
- Greenock Wanderers
| 2008- | Ayr | | |
Senior career
| Years | Team | Apps | (Points) |
| 2008-09 | Glasgow Warriors | 0 | (0) |
International career
| Years | Team | Apps | (Points) |
- Scotland U18
| – | Scotland U20 | | |
National sevens team
| Years | Team | | Comps |
- Scotland 7s

Grant Anderson is a Scotland 7s international rugby union player. He plays for Ayr.

== Rugby Union career ==
=== Amateur career ===
Anderson began his career with Greenock Wanderers.

In 2008 he was playing with Ayr.

He was top try scorer for Ayr in 2013-14.

=== Professional career ===
He was part of the Scottish National Academy in 2008-09, assigned to Glasgow Warriors.

=== International career ===
While part of the Greenock Wanderers squad he was called up to the Scotland U18 side for the U18 Six Nations tournament in 2007.

He was called up to the Scotland U20s in 2009 for the IRB Nations Cup.

He was part of the Scotland 7s side for the IRB World Series in George, South Africa.

He was called up to the Scotland 7s squad and played for them in the Dubai Sevens of 2007.

Called up again in 2008, he had to pull out of the 2008 IRB World Sevens series due to a knee injury. He was back in the squad in December 2008 for the South Africa Sevens.

He was called up again to the 7s side in 2010.
