= Andrew Kelly (rugby union, born 1981) =

Scottish rugby union player (born 1981)

- Born: Andrew William Kelly; 21 June 1981 (age 45) Alexandria, Scotland
- Height: 6 ft 2 in (1.88 m)
- Weight: 110 kg (17 st 5 lb; 243 lb)
- School: Marr College

Rugby union career
- Position: Tighthead Prop
Amateur team(s)
Years	Team	Apps	(Points)
- Ayr RFC
–	Glasgow Hutchesons Aloysians		
–	Ayr RFC	2010	
Senior career
Years	Team	Apps	(Points)
2001-05	Glasgow Warriors	50	(0)
International career
Years	Team	Apps	(Points)
- Scotland U21
–	Scotland Club XV		

Andrew Kelly (born 26 June 1981 in Alexandria, Scotland) is a former Scotland Club XV international rugby union player. He played for Glasgow Warriors at the Tighthead Prop position.

== Rugby Union career ==
=== Amateur career ===
He came through the Ayr RFC youth system before being snapped up by the Warriors. He played for Glasgow Hutchesons Aloysians and moved back to Ayr in 2010.

=== Professional career ===
He was a member of the 1999 Glasgow Thistles squad which went to New Zealand for rugby training.

From Ayr he signed for Glasgow Warriors.

=== International career ===
He has played for the Scotland U21 side.

He has also played for the Scotland Club XV.
