= Jonathan van der Schyff =

South African rugby union player

- Born: Jonathan van der Schyff; 23 May 1983 (age 43) Carletonville, South Africa
- Height: 1.96 m (6 ft 5 in)
- Weight: 108 kg (17 st 0 lb)
- School: Monument High School (Krugersdorp)

Rugby union career
- Position: Flanker / Lock
Amateur team(s)
Years	Team	Apps	(Points)
- Currie
Senior career
Years	Team	Apps	(Points)
2004–05	Glasgow Warriors	2	(0)
Provincial / State sides
Years	Team	Apps	(Points)
- Blue Bulls U19
- Blue Bulls U20
- Sharks
2006-07	Pumas	15	(5)
International career
Years	Team	Apps	(Points)
- South Africa U18
–	South Africa U19		

Jonathan van der Schyff (born 23 May 1983 in Carletonville, South Africa) is a former South Africa Under-19 international rugby union player who played as a Flanker and lock for Glasgow Warriors and Currie.

== Rugby Union career ==
=== Amateur career ===
Van der Schyff played for Currie.

=== Provincial and professional career ===
Van der Schyff played for Blue Bulls U19 and Blue Bulls U20 in the Currie Cup. He also played for Sharks in the same competition.

He played for Glasgow Warriors in the 2004–05 season.

He made one appearance in the Celtic League, playing against Newport Gwent Dragons.

He made another single appearance in that season's Heineken Cup, playing against Scarlets in Wales.

Back to South Africa for the 2006-07 season, he played for the Pumas.

=== International career ===
Van der Schyff played for South Africa U18 and South Africa U19 age grades.
