= Steven Duffy =

Scottish rugby union player (born 1980)

- Born: Steven Duffy; 16 April 1980 (age 46) West Kilbride, Scotland
- Height: 1.80 m (5 ft 11 in)
- Weight: 83 kg (13 st 1 lb)
- School: Ardrossan Academy
- University: Strathclyde University

Rugby union career
- Position: Centre
Amateur team(s)
Years	Team	Apps	(Points)
- Ardrossan Academicals
–	Glasgow Hawks		
Senior career
Years	Team	Apps	(Points)
2004-06	Glasgow Warriors		
Provincial / State sides
Years	Team	Apps	(Points)
- Glasgow District U18s
International career
Years	Team	Apps	(Points)
2006	Scotland Club XV		
National sevens team
Years	Team		Comps
- Scotland 7s

Steven Duffy (born 16 April 1980) is a former Scotland Club XV international rugby union footballer who played at Centre. He played for Glasgow Warriors.

== Amateur career ==
Duffy started out with Ardrossan Academicals.

He played for Glasgow District U18s at provincial level.

He then moved on to Glasgow Hawks. He captained the Hawks in 2006-07 and in 2008-09.

== Professional career ==
Duffy joined Glasgow Warriors as one of their academy players in season 2004-05.

He played for Glasgow Warriors against Edinburgh Rugby in a pre-season match in 2005-06 season. Glasgow lost the match 7 - 24.

He played for Glasgow Warriors again in their pre-season match against Newcastle Falcons Academy in that same season. He scored a try in the match with the Warriors running out 50 - 5 winners.

== International career ==
Duffy was selected for the Scotland 7s.

He was also selected for Scotland Club XV and was capped in 2006.
