= Steven Manning =

- Born: Steven Manning Scotland
- School: Belmont Academy
- University: Edinburgh University

Rugby union career
- Position: Wing
Amateur team(s)
Years	Team	Apps	(Points)
- Ayr
Senior career
Years	Team	Apps	(Points)
2004-06	Glasgow Warriors		
Provincial / State sides
Years	Team	Apps	(Points)
- Glasgow District U19
International career
Years	Team	Apps	(Points)
- Scotland U21

Steven Manning is a former Scotland U21 international rugby union player who played on the Wing for Glasgow Warriors and Ayr.

== Rugby Union career ==
=== Amateur career ===
A product of Belmont Academy in Ayr, Manning was selected by the Glasgow District U19 side. He played for the Ayrshire academy in the Scottish Schools Cup in 2000.

Manning played for Ayr. He won young player of the year for season 2002-03. He played for Ayr in the British and Irish Cup from 2009 to 2011.

=== Professional career ===
In season 2004-05 Manning made the Warriors squad but only made the bench in the Warriors match away to Munster Rugby on 21 February 2005.

Manning played for Glasgow Warriors in 2005-06 season. He came on from the bench in the Warriors August match against Edinburgh Rugby that season.

=== International career ===
Manning was capped at Scotland U21 level.
