= Stuart Yule =

- Born: Stuart Yule; 17 March 1976 (age 50) South Africa
- Weight: 104.23 kg (229.8 lb; 16 st 5.8 lb)
- Notable relative(s): Tommy Yule, brother Kerr Yule, son, rugby union player

Rugby union career
Coaching career
- Years: Team
- 2007-17: Glasgow Warriors (Head Strength & Conditioning Coach)
- 2017-: Scotland (Head Strength & Conditioning Coach)

Stuart Yule
Sport
- Country: Scotland
- Sport: Weightlifting

Stuart Yule (born 17 March 1976 in South Africa) is a Scottish rugby union strength and conditioning coach with the Scotland international rugby union side. He was previously a coach at Glasgow Warriors. He previously was a weightlifter and represented Scotland at the sport at the 1998 and 2002 Commonwealth Games.

== Weightlifting ==
Yule was 9 times the Scottish weightlifting champion from 1994 to 2002.

Yule competed in the under 105 kg category in weightlifting.

He represented Scotland in two Commonwealth Games; in 1998 and 2002.

== Strongest man competitions ==
He was Scotland's strongest man in the under 90 kg category in 2011.

He was Scotland's strongest man in the under 105 kg category in 2012.

== Football ==
Having graduated in physiotherapy, Yule was previously a physio for Falkirk FC.

== Rugby Union ==
=== Coaching career ===
He started as a Strength and Conditioning Coach for Glasgow Warriors in 2007.

He regularly gives presentations on his strength and conditioning philosophies and the role they have at Glasgow Warriors.

Yule was named as Strength and Conditioning Coach of the year in 2014 by the UK Strength and Conditioning Association.

He was a Director of UKSCA from 2009-11.

He moved to become the Strength and Conditioning Coach for Scotland in the summer of 2017.

== Family ==
His twin brother Tommy Yule has also represented Scotland at weightlifting. He previously won medals representing England as he was originally not allowed to represent Scotland.

His father represented Scotland at the 1974 Commonwealth Games.

His mother represented Scotland at the 1970 Commonwealth Games in the Shot Put.

His son Kerr Yule plays rugby union for Glasgow Warriors.
