= Alex Mockford =

- Born: Alex Mockford; 3 May 1981 (age 45) England
- Height: 1.91 m (6 ft 3 in)
- Weight: 100 kg (15 st 10 lb; 220 lb)

Rugby union career
- Position: Number Eight
Amateur team(s)
Years	Team	Apps	(Points)
- Sutton and Epsom
2006-08	Esher		
- Sutton and Epsom
Senior career
Years	Team	Apps	(Points)
1999-2003	Harlequins		
2003-2004	Pau		
2004	Glasgow Warriors		
2005	Bristol		
International career
Years	Team	Apps	(Points)
- England U18
- England U19
- Rugby league career

Playing information
- Position: Back row
Club
Years	Team	Pld	T	G	FG	P
2006	Wakefield Trinity	2

Alex Mockford (born 3 May 1981, in England) is a former English rugby union player who played for Glasgow Warriors, Harlequins, Bristol and Pau at the Number Eight position.

== Amateur career ==
Mockford started with Sutton and Epsom.

He played with Esher from 2006 to 2008. He later played for Sutton and Epsom again.

== Professional career ==
He started with Harlequins in 1999. He stayed with them until 2003.

Mockford played with Pau in 2003–04. He played 4 matches in the European Challenge Cup for the French side.

Mockford had a trial with Glasgow Warriors in the 2004–05 season. He played a pre-season friendly against Sale Sharks. However during the match Mockford suffered a knee injury which ultimately put paid to his Glasgow ambitions.

The injury, of a cruciate ligament, keep him sidelined from rugby for 10 months. After this lay-off he was taken on by Bristol.

== International career ==
Mockford played for England at Under 18 and Under 19 level and for England Students.

== Rugby League ==
In 2006 he played a couple of trial matches for Wakefield Trinity Wildcats.

== Outside rugby ==
Mockford has now built a career in marketing for the gambling industry.
