= Shawn Renwick =

- Born: Shawn Gary Renwick; 31 August 1979 (age 47)
- Height: 6 ft 3 in (1.91 m)
- Weight: 110 kg (17 st 5 lb)

Rugby union career
- Position: Flanker
Amateur team(s)
Years	Team	Apps	(Points)
- Moseley
–	Esher		
–	Stirling County		
–	Esher		
–	Sutton & Epsom		
Senior career
Years	Team	Apps	(Points)
2003-04	Glasgow Warriors	8	(5)
Provincial / State sides
Years	Team	Apps	(Points)
- Western Province

Shawn Renwick (born 31 August 1979) is a rugby union player. He previously played with the Scottish provincial side Glasgow Warriors; and with the South African provincial side Western Province.

== Rugby Union career ==
=== Amateur career ===
He played for Moseley.

He played for Esher in 2002.

He played for Stirling County.

He signed for Esher at the start of the 2008-09 season. He was still with Esher in 2009.

In 2013, he was playing for Sutton & Epsom.

=== Provincial and professional career ===
He played for Western Province in South Africa.

He played for Glasgow Warriors in their Celtic League match against the Dragons on 5 March 2004. He has the Warrior Number 123.
