= Johnny Williams (rugby union, born 1982) =

English rugby union player

Johnny Williams (born 29 December 1982 in Rotherham, Yorkshire) is an English rugby union player for Newcastle Falcons in the Guinness Premiership. Williams' position of choice is as a prop.
