= Andrew Millward =

Welsh rugby union player

Andrew John Millward
- Born: Andrew Millward; December 1, 1972 (age 53) Wales
- Height: 1.78 m (5 ft 10 in)
- Weight: 113 kg (17 st 11 lb)

Rugby union career
- Position: Prop
Youth career
- Taibach RFC
Senior career
Years	Team	Apps	(Points)
	Neath, Ospreys	1 (Wales)	((Wales))

Andrew Millward (born 1 December 1972) was a rugby union player for the Ospreys in the Celtic League. Millward's position of choice was as a prop. He is now Rugby General Manager for the team in the Pro14.
