= Eric Milligan (rugby union) =

Scottish rugby union player

Eric Shannon Milligan
- Born: Eric Shannon Milligan; 28 September 1981 (age 45) Scotland
- Height: 1.84 m (6 ft 0 in)
- Weight: 104 kg (16 st 5 lb)
- School: Kilmarnock Academy
- University: Edinburgh University
- Occupation: Physical education

Rugby union career
- Position: Hooker
Amateur team(s)
Years	Team	Apps	(Points)
- Kilmarnock
- Currie RFC
2002-06	Glasgow Hawks		
2006-09	Hawick		
2009-12	Glasgow Hawks		
Senior career
Years	Team	Apps	(Points)
2003-09	Glasgow Warriors	31	(0)
Provincial / State sides
Years	Team	Apps	(Points)
- Glasgow District U16
International career
Years	Team	Apps	(Points)
- Scotland U16
–	Scotland U19		
–	Scotland U21		
–	Scotland Club XV		
Coaching career
- Years: Team
- 2010-: Hutchesons Grammar School

Eric Milligan (born 28 September 1981 in Scotland) is a Scottish former rugby union player who played for Glasgow Warriors. The position he normally plays is hooker but he also plays prop.

He studied to be a teacher at the University of Edinburgh.

Milligan is a teacher at Hutchesons Grammar School where he is the Director of Sport and Physical Education and coaches the school rugby team.

== Amateur career ==
He represented Glasgow District U16 at provincial level.

He played for Kilmarnock and Currie RFC before joining Glasgow Hawks He went on to captain the Hawks side.

While with the Warriors he played for Hawick.

He left the Warriors for a career as a teacher in 2009. That year he re-joined Glasgow Hawks.

== Professional career ==
In 1997-98 season he was picked as one of the Glasgow Thistles to go to New Zealand and continue his rugby education in the summer of 1998. At the time he was still playing rugby for his school Stewarton Academy and Kilmarnock RFC.

He was a backup player for the Warriors in seasons 2003-04 and 2004-05.

He was promoted from Glasgow Warrior's academy in 2005-06 season. He played 31 times for the Warriors.

== International career ==
Milligan played for Scotland U16, Scotland U19 and Scotland U21 He also played for Scotland Club XV.
