= Jamie Hunter (rugby union) =

Scottish rugby union player

- Born: 21 March 1987 (age 39) Scotland
- Height: 1.73 m (5 ft 8 in)
- Weight: 75 kg (11 st 11 lb)
- School: Hillhead High School
- University: Glasgow Caledonian University

Rugby union career
- Position: Scrum half
Amateur team(s)
Years	Team	Apps	(Points)
- Hillhead Jordanhill
–	Glasgow Hawks		
–	West of Scotland		
–	Ayr		
Senior career
Years	Team	Apps	(Points)
2007-08	Glasgow Warriors		
International career
Years	Team	Apps	(Points)
- Scotland U18
–	Scotland U19		
–	Scotland U20		
National sevens team
Years	Team		Comps
- Scotland 7s

Jamie Hunter (born 21 March 1987 in Scotland) is a former Scotland 7s international rugby union footballer who played for Glasgow Warriors. He played at Scrum half.

== Rugby union career ==
=== Amateur career ===
Hunter played for Hillhead Jordanhill before moving on to Glasgow Hawks. He then played for West of Scotland.

Later Hunter played for Ayr.

=== Professional career ===
Hunter had played for Glasgow U18s.

Hunter was an Elite Development Player for Glasgow Warriors in season 2007–08.

=== International career ===
Hunter has played for Scotland U18, Scotland U19 and Scotland U20

He was in the Scotland 7s squad for the IRB World Series 7s tournaments in Wellington (1 and 2 February) and San Diego (9 and 10 February) in 2008.
