= Paul Burke (rugby union, born 1982) =

Scottish rugby union player

- Born: Paul Burke; 1 October 1982 (age 44) South Ayrshire, Scotland
- Height: 5 ft 11 in (1.80 m)
- Weight: 104 kg (16 st 5 lb)

Rugby union career
- Position: Flanker
Amateur team(s)
Years	Team	Apps	(Points)
- Ayr
–	Marr		
Senior career
Years	Team	Apps	(Points)
2010-11	Glasgow Warriors	4	(0)
International career
Years	Team	Apps	(Points)
- Scotland Club XV
Coaching career
- Years: Team
- Marr (Asst.)

Paul Burke (born 1 October 1982) is a former Scotland Club XV international rugby union player, previously with Glasgow Warriors and Ayr.

== Rugby Union career ==
=== Amateur career ===
He played for Ayr. While with Ayr he won the Scottish Premiership and the Scottish Cup.

He then played for Marr. While at Marr he won the 2010–11 season, he then won a run of four successive league title wins which promoted the club from the sixth to the second tier of Scottish club rugby for the 2014–15 season. They were promoted to the Scottish Premiership in the 2016-17.

=== Professional career ===
He played for Glasgow Warriors in their pre-season matches against Sale Sharks, Clermont Auvergne and La Rochelle.

He made his competitive debut for the Warriors in their Celtic League match against Cardiff Blues at Firhill Stadium on 19 February 2010. He is Warrior Number 180.

=== International career ===
He has been capped by Scotland Club XV.

=== Coaching career ===
He has been Assistant Coach at Marr.

== Management career ==
Burke has managed various gyms in the Bannatyne group;- in Ayr, Inverness and Dunfermline.

He has a degree in Sports Science from the University of the West of Scotland.
