= Chris Kinloch =

- Born: Chris Kinloch; 17 December 1988 (age 37) Scotland
- Height: 6 ft 1 in (1.85 m)
- Weight: 90 kg (14 st 2 lb)

Rugby union career
- Position: Wing
Amateur team(s)
Years	Team	Apps	(Points)
2007-09	Edinburgh Academicals		
2009-10	Currie		
2009-10	Gael Force		
2010-13	Loughborough Students		
Senior career
Years	Team	Apps	(Points)
2008-10	Glasgow Warriors	3	(0)
2013-16	Ealing Trailfinders	20	(5)
Provincial / State sides
Years	Team	Apps	(Points)
- Edinburgh District U18
International career
Years	Team	Apps	(Points)
- Scotland U18
–	Scotland U19		
–	Scotland U20		
National sevens team
Years	Team		Comps
2007-	Scotland 7s		

Chris Kinloch (born 17 December 1988) is a Scotland 7s international rugby union player.

== Rugby Union career ==
=== Amateur career ===
He played for Edinburgh Academicals when called up by Scotland for the Under 19 World Championship in 2007.

In the 2008–09 season, he was drafted to Edinburgh Academicals in the pro-player draft of that season.

The following season he was drafted instead to Currie. While with Currie, he won with team the Scottish Premiership in that 2009–10 season.

That same season he also played for Gael Force.

From 2010 to 2013 he played for Loughborough Students.

=== Provincial and professional career ===
He played for Edinburgh District U18s.

He signed for Glasgow Warriors in 2008 after impressing in the friendly Warriors Challenge Vaquerin tournament. He made his Warriors competitive debut against Ulster at Stadium on 7 March 2009. He is Warrior No. 170.

He signed for Ealing Trailfinders in 2013.

=== International career ===
Kinloch was capped at Scotland U18 and Scotland U19 grades.

He played 4 times for the Scotland U20s.

He made his debut for the Scotland 7s in February 2007.
