= Fergus Thomson =

Scotland international rugby union player

- Born: Fergus Matthew Andrew Thomson; 18 October 1983 (age 43) Dundee, Scotland
- Height: 6 ft 0 in (1.83 m)
- Weight: 16 st 1 lb (104 kg)
- School: Bell Baxter High School
- University: University of Glasgow

Rugby union career
- Position: Hooker
- Current team: Glasgow Warriors
Youth career
- West of Scotland FC
Senior career
Years	Team	Apps	(Points)
- Howe of Fife RFC
- Glasgow Hawks
2003–2012	Glasgow Warriors	124	(20)
International career
Years	Team	Apps	(Points)
2007/08	Scotland	6	(0)
2009/10	Scotland A	3	(0)
- Correct as of 15 March 2008.

Fergus Matthew Andrew Thomson (born 18 September 1983) is a Scottish rugby union hooker who plays for Glasgow Warriors. He was a member of the Scotland squad for the 2007 Rugby World Cup in France.

Thomson made his Celtic League début in November 2004 for Glasgow Warriors against the Border Reivers. He won his first international cap, aged 23, on 11 August 2007 against Ireland at Murrayfield; Scotland won the match 31–21.

In 2012 it was announced that Thomson would be leaving the Warriors at the end of the season alongside others, such as Rob Dewey, Richie Gray and Johnnie Beattie.
