= Colin Shaw (rugby union, born 1983) =

Scottish rugby union player

- Born: Colin Shaw; 10 May 1983 (age 43) Irvine, Scotland
- Height: 1.9 m (6 ft 3 in)
- Weight: 92 kg (14 st 7 lb)

Rugby union career
- Position: Wing / Full Back
Amateur team(s)
| Years | Team | Apps | (Points) |
- Ayr
| – | Glasgow Hawks | | |
Senior career
| Years | Team | Apps | (Points) |
| 2003-12 | Glasgow Warriors | 73 | (55) |
International career
| Years | Team | Apps | (Points) |
- Scotland U19
| – | Scotland U21 | | |
| – | Scotland 'A' | | |
National sevens team
| Years | Team | | Comps |
| 2008-15 | Scotland | | 36 |

Colin Shaw (born 10 May 1983 in Irvine, Scotland) is a former Scotland 7s international rugby union player who played on the wing and Full Back for Glasgow Warriors.

== Rugby union career ==
=== Amateur career ===
He played for Ayr RFC at the start of his rugby career.

He then played for Glasgow Hawks winning 3 league and 1 cup in his 3 years before breaking into the Warriors team in 2003.

He won the Melrose Sevens in 2008 playing for the Scottish Thistles.

=== Professional career ===
He was part of the Glasgow Thistles squad - Glasgow district's Academy side - which went to New Zealand for rugby training in the summer of 2000.

He scored a try on his Warriors debut against Gloucester in the pre-season match in 2003. He made his competitive debut in the Celtic League against Cardiff Blues in 2004 and he was offered a full-time contract with the Warriors in 2005.

=== International career ===
Shaw played for Scotland U19s in the world U-19 championship in Italy in 2002 and for the Scotland U21s in the U-21 World Cup in England in 2003. He made two caps for Scotland 'A'.

Having made his debut for Scotland 7s in 2008 at the George 7s in South Africa, after playing in 36 tournaments on the IRB World Sevens Circuit, Shaw announced his retirement in 2015.
