= Steve Swindall =

Scottish rugby union player

- Born: Steve Swindall; 11 December 1982 (age 43) Scotland
- Height: 1.92 m (6 ft 4 in)
- Weight: 108 kg (17 st 0 lb)

Rugby union career
- Position: Flanker
Amateur team(s)
Years	Team	Apps	(Points)
- Whitecraigs
- Glasgow Hawks
2010-11	Amatori Rugby Milano		
2011-14	Stirling County		
2014-	Austin Blacks		
Senior career
Years	Team	Apps	(Points)
2003-09	Glasgow Warriors	65	(30)
2009-10	Rotherham Titans		
2010-11	Glasgow Warriors	0	(0)
International career
Years	Team	Apps	(Points)
-	Scotland U18		
–	Scotland U19		
–	Scotland U21		
–	Scotland 'A'		
Coaching career
- Years: Team
- 2009-10: Rotherham Titans (Community Coach)
- 2010-11: Amatori Rugby Milano (Player-Coach)
- 2011-12: Morrison's Academy
- 2011-14: Stirling County (Forwards coach)
- 2014-: Austin Blacks (Forwards & Defence)

Steve Swindall (born 11 December 1982 in Scotland) is a Scottish former rugby union footballer who played for Glasgow Warriors. He played internationally for the Scotland 'A' side.

== Club career ==
Swindall came through the amateur ranks playing for Whitecraigs before playing for Glasgow Hawks. Swindall made his Glasgow Warriors debut in 2004 playing against Yorkshire Carnegie, then known as Leeds Tykes, in a pre-season friendly. He landed a professional deal with Glasgow Warriors in 2005. He left Glasgow to play for the Rotherham Titans in 2009 but stayed for only one year, rejoining Glasgow for a final season in 2010–11. He then played for amateur club Stirling County.

He now plays and coaches in Austin, Texas in the United States for amateur side Austin Blacks.

== International career ==
He played internationally for Scotland at age grades U18, U19 and U21 before being capped for the Scotland 'A' side.
