= Graeme Morrison =

Scotland international rugby union player

- Born: Graeme Alexander Morrison; 17 October 1982 (age 44) Hong Kong
- Height: 1.91 m (6 ft 3 in)
- Weight: 105 kg (16 st 7 lb)
- School: Dollar Academy
- University: Glasgow University

Rugby union career
- Position: Centre
Senior career
Years	Team	Apps	(Points)
2003–2013	Glasgow Warriors	176	(110)
International career
Years	Team	Apps	(Points)
2004–2013	Scotland	35	(15)
- Correct as of 25 October 2012

Graeme Morrison (born 17 October 1982 in Hong Kong) is a retired Scottish rugby union footballer. He played for Glasgow Warriors and Scotland as a Centre.

== Rugby Union career ==
=== Amateur career ===
Morrison played as a schoolboy for, Dollar Academy, where he captained the first XV.

=== Professional career ===
He played for Glasgow Warriors for 10 years, making 176 appearances and 110 points.

On 20 May 2013, after a successful season for Glasgow, third in the Pro12 and Semi-finals of the play-offs, Graeme announced his retirement from rugby on medical advice, struggling with persistent knee problems.

=== International career ===
He has represented Scotland at under-21 level.

Morrison played in all four tests against Australia in 2004. He scored his first international try in the win over Japan at McDiarmid Park in the same year. Since then, he has gone on to win more than 30 test caps for Scotland.

He was recalled to the Scotland team for the first time in four years, for the Calcutta Cup tie against England on 8 March 2008, following some excellent displays for his club side, Glasgow Warriors.
