= Scott Forrest =

Scottish rugby union footballer and coach

- Born: Scott William Forrest; 6 August 1984 (age 42) Rutherglen, Scotland
- Height: 6 ft 2 in (1.88 m)
- Weight: 101 kg (15 st 13 lb; 223 lb)
- School: Hamilton College
- University: University of Strathclyde

Rugby union career
- Position: Number Eight
Amateur team(s)
Years	Team	Apps	(Points)
2001–2003	Cambuslang		
2001–2006	Glasgow Hawks		
2006–2007	Hawick		
2006–2009	Ayr		
2009–2010	Currie		
Senior career
Years	Team	Apps	(Points)
2005–2006	Glasgow Warriors	0	(0)
2006–2007	Border Reivers		
2007–2010	→ Glasgow Warriors (loan)	0	(0)
- Correct as of 25 April 2015
International career
Years	Team	Apps	(Points)
2003	Scotland U19		
2004–2005	Scotland U21	15	
National sevens team
Years	Team		Comps
2006–2010	Scotland 7s		30 (Note: Tally of World Sevens Series Tournaments entered.)
Coaching career
- Years: Team
- 2012-14: Cambuslang
- 2014-: Ayr (Backs)
- 2014-17: Scotland Women 7s
- 2018-22: Scotland Women (Asst.)
- 2022-25: Scotland U20 (Attack)
- 2025-: Glasgow Warriors (Asst.)

Scott William Forrest (born 6 August 1984) is a former Scotland 7s international rugby union player and now coach. He is now an Assistant Coach at Glasgow Warriors. He competed in rugby sevens at 2010 Commonwealth Games, serving as captain of the national team at the event. He was previously the head coach of the Scotland Women 7s squad and the Great Britain Women 7s team for the 2020 Tokyo Olympics.

== Early life ==
Forrest was born in Rutherglen. He attended West Coats Primary School (Cambuslang) and Hamilton College, then studied sport and exercise science at the University of Strathclyde.

== Rugby career ==
=== Playing ===
He started playing for Cambuslang at the age of eight years. He was attached to Glasgow Warriors from 2005, but made his professional debut for Border Reivers in 2007 shortly before the club folded, at which point he signed a 7s contract with Scotland, but was still affiliated with the Warriors.

He represented Scotland at under-19 level while playing for Cambuslang, and at under-21 level while with Glasgow Hawks.

In Sevens, Forrest became involved in Scotland squads in 2006, playing in 30 World Rugby Sevens Series tournaments from the 2005–06 World Sevens Series onwards. Despite breaking an ankle playing 15s rugby in November 2008, he returned to take part in the 2009 Rugby World Cup Sevens in Dubai the following March, leading his nation to victory in the Plate (the second-tier competition for those who did not progress in the primary Cup), then achieving rare semi-final placings at the 2009 London Sevens and 2009 Edinburgh Sevens World Series events.

In September 2010 it was revealed that he would captain the Scotland Sevens team at the 2010 Commonwealth Games sevens competition in Delhi, which he later described as the highlight of his career. After the event (in which Scotland placed sixth overall, losing the Plate final to Samoa), Forrest announced his retirement from playing at the age of 26 on account of long-term injury. He took a post as rugby development officer in Inverclyde.

=== Coaching ===
From 2012 Forrest coached the First XV at Cambuslang, then in May 2014 moved to Premiership side Ayr, where he had also been a player, to become the club's backs specialist.

In April 2012 he became the coach for the new Scotland Women 7s squad that were scheduled to compete in a FIRA-AER tournament in Belgium in June 2012. After five years in the role, in 2017 he stepped down and was replaced by Scott Wight. He then worked as a performance lifestyle adviser at the Sportscotland Institute of Sport, before returning to Scottish Rugby in late 2018 to take up the position of Women's High Performance Manager, 7s Head Coach and 15s Assistant Coach.

He joined Glasgow Warriors in June 2025 as Assistant Coach.

== Club honours ==
Glasgow Hawks

- Scottish Premiership: 2003–04, 2004–05, 2005–06
- Scottish Cup: 2003–04

Ayr

- Scottish Premiership: 2008–09

Currie

- Scottish Premiership: 2009–10
