= Dan Turner (rugby union) =

Scottish rugby union player

Dan "the Detonator" Turner
- Born: Daniel Turner; 9 February 1980 (age 46) New Zealand
- Height: 6 ft 6 in (1.98 m)
- Weight: 95 kg (14 st 13 lb)

Rugby union career
- Position: Lock
Amateur team(s)
Years	Team	Apps	(Points)
-	Melrose		
Senior career
Years	Team	Apps	(Points)
2004–10	Glasgow Warriors	135	(20)
2010-11	Toyota Jido Shokki		
International career
Years	Team	Apps	(Points)
2008	Scotland A	7	

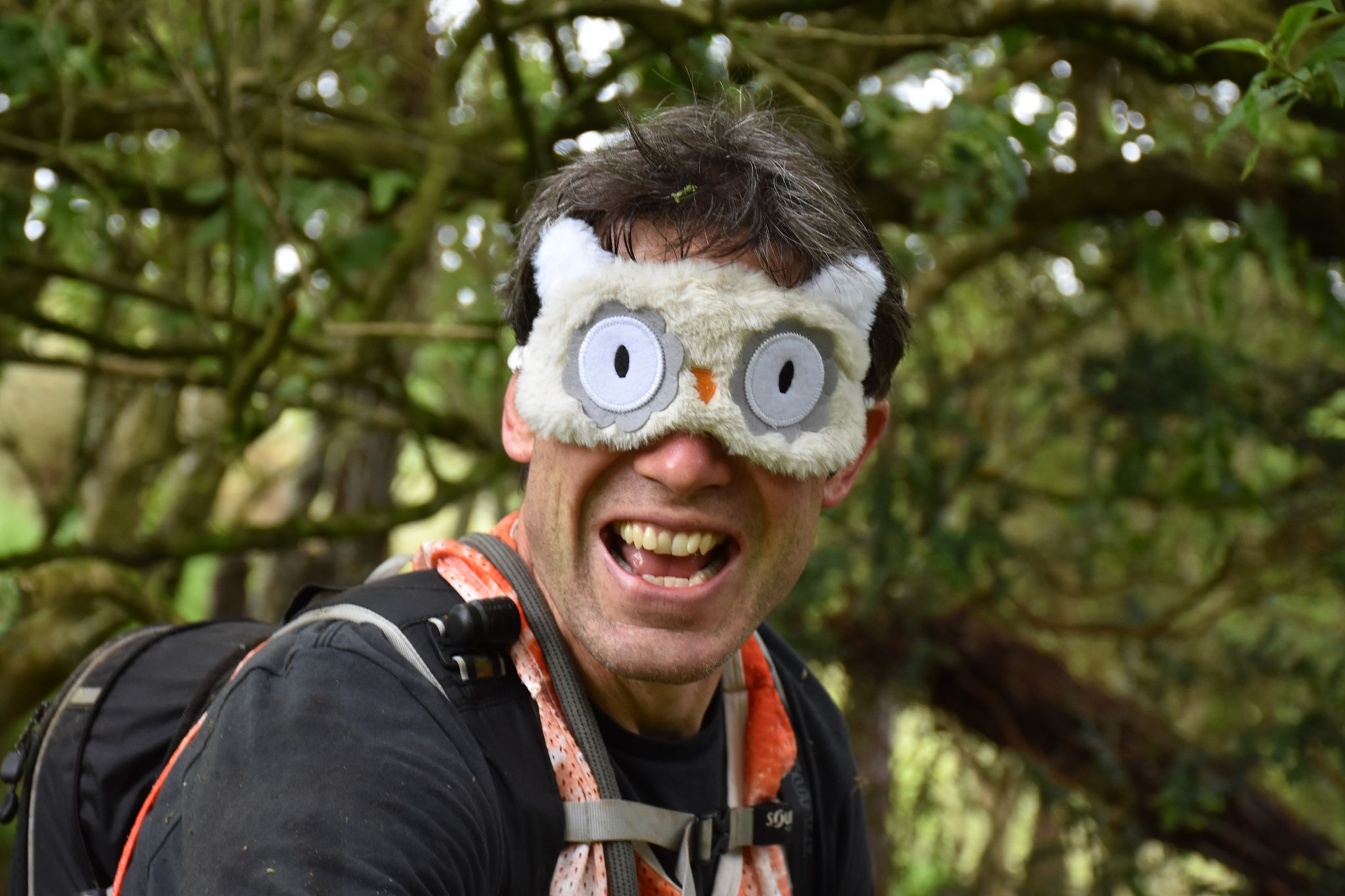
Dan Turner at the 2021 Big Bang Adventure Race wearing an amusing mask

Dan Turner (born 9 February 1980) (also known as Otaihanga Dan, Diesel Turbo, Dulcet Tones, DT, Turnip, Danimal or the Detonator) is a New Zealand born Scotland A international rugby union player who played for Glasgow Warriors at the Lock position.

He played for Canterbury University in New Zealand and was part of the Canterbury Crusaders development squad.

He signed for Glasgow Warriors in 2004. He qualified for Scotland through residency and confirmed his Scottish nationality by receiving a Scotland A cap in 2008. He gained seven caps for Scotland A.

Turner moved from Glasgow to Japan in 2010. He played a year in Japan, turning out for Toyota Shokki, before moving back to New Zealand.

He is now a civil engineer for Land Matters Limited.

Since retiring from professional rugby Dan has kept fit by taking part in endurance sport, most recently winning the Tararua Mountain Race Veteran Pair category in 2020 with team mate Sam Pritchard.
