= Colin Gregor =

Scottish rugby union player

- Born: Colin Rhys Gregor; 31 May 1981 (age 45)
- Height: 5 ft 10 in (1.78 m)
- Weight: 12 st 7 lb (79 kg)

Rugby union career
- Position(s): Scrum-half, Stand-off
Amateur team(s)
Years	Team	Apps	(Points)
- Strathendrick
2000-08	Watsonians		
2004	Glasgow Hawks		
2008-09	West of Scotland		
2009-10	Watsonians		
2010-11	Dundee HSFP		
–	Glasgow Hawks		
Senior career
Years	Team	Apps	(Points)
2004 - 2011	Glasgow Warriors	122	(317)
International career
Years	Team	Apps	(Points)
	Scotland A	9	
National sevens team
Years	Team		Comps
2003 - 2015	Scotland 7s		69 (1649)
Coaching career
- Years: Team
- 2016–: Glasgow Hawks (Assistant)

Colin Gregor (born 31 May 1981) is a retired Scottish rugby union player. He was the captain of the Scotland 7s team from 2009 to 2014. He was the eighth player, and first Scot, to score over 1,000 points on the IRB Sevens World Series. He retired as the most capped sevens player in Scottish history, having played in 58 IRB Sevens World Series tournaments, three Sevens World Cups (in Hong Kong 2005, Dubai 2009 and Moscow 2013) and two Commonwealth Games in Melbourne, 2006 and at Glasgow 2014 where he was captain. He played as a Scrum-half or Fly-half. His favourite niece and nephew are Nara and Zach and his favourite sister is Laura

== Professional career ==
Gregor signed professional terms with Glasgow Warriors in 2004. Colin amassed over 100 appearances in 8 years at the Glasgow Warriors. During this time he also featured 9 times for Scotland A, including selection for the Churchill Cup in 2006 and 2008, alongside regular appearances on the IRB Sevens World Series.

He won 9 caps for the Scotland A team. He was called up to the senior Scotland national rugby union team training squad in October 2008, however he was ultimately not capped at that level.

He signed a full-time contract to the Scotland 7s team in 2011. In December 2013, he became the first Scot to score 1000 points for his country at sevens and the eighth player to pass that milestone in the HSBC Sevens World Series.

In May 2015 he equalled the record number of 7s caps held by Andrew Turnbull. He retired in July 2015 at the age of 34.

== Amateur career ==
His rugby career started with mini rugby at GHK and subsequently Glasgow Hawks. In the latter years of his education at Balfron High School he joined his local team, Strathendrick RFC. Colin played an integral role as the team in the 8th division of Scottish rugby went on a 'fairytale run' to the semi-finals of the Scottish Cup.

After moving to Edinburgh, in 1999, to study history at the University of Edinburgh (graduated with a 2:1 MA History) he joined Watsonians. In his final year of study he first represented Scotland, at the 2003 Hong Kong 7s. Whilst playing for Watsonians RFC he regularly competed on the King of the Sevens circuit, winning tournaments at Gala, Hawick, Jed-Forest, Peebles and Earlston.

== Coaching career ==
On 30 March 2016 it was announced that Gregor would be the new Assistant Coach of Glasgow Hawks, his former side.

== Other activities ==
Gregor also writes regular articles for The Sun newspaper and undertakes charity work for The Craig Hodgkinson Trust and Chest Heart Stroke Scotland. Furthermore, he is a "Champion" for the Winning Scotland Foundation "Champions in Schools" project.
