= Dan Parks =

Scottish rugby union player (born 1978)

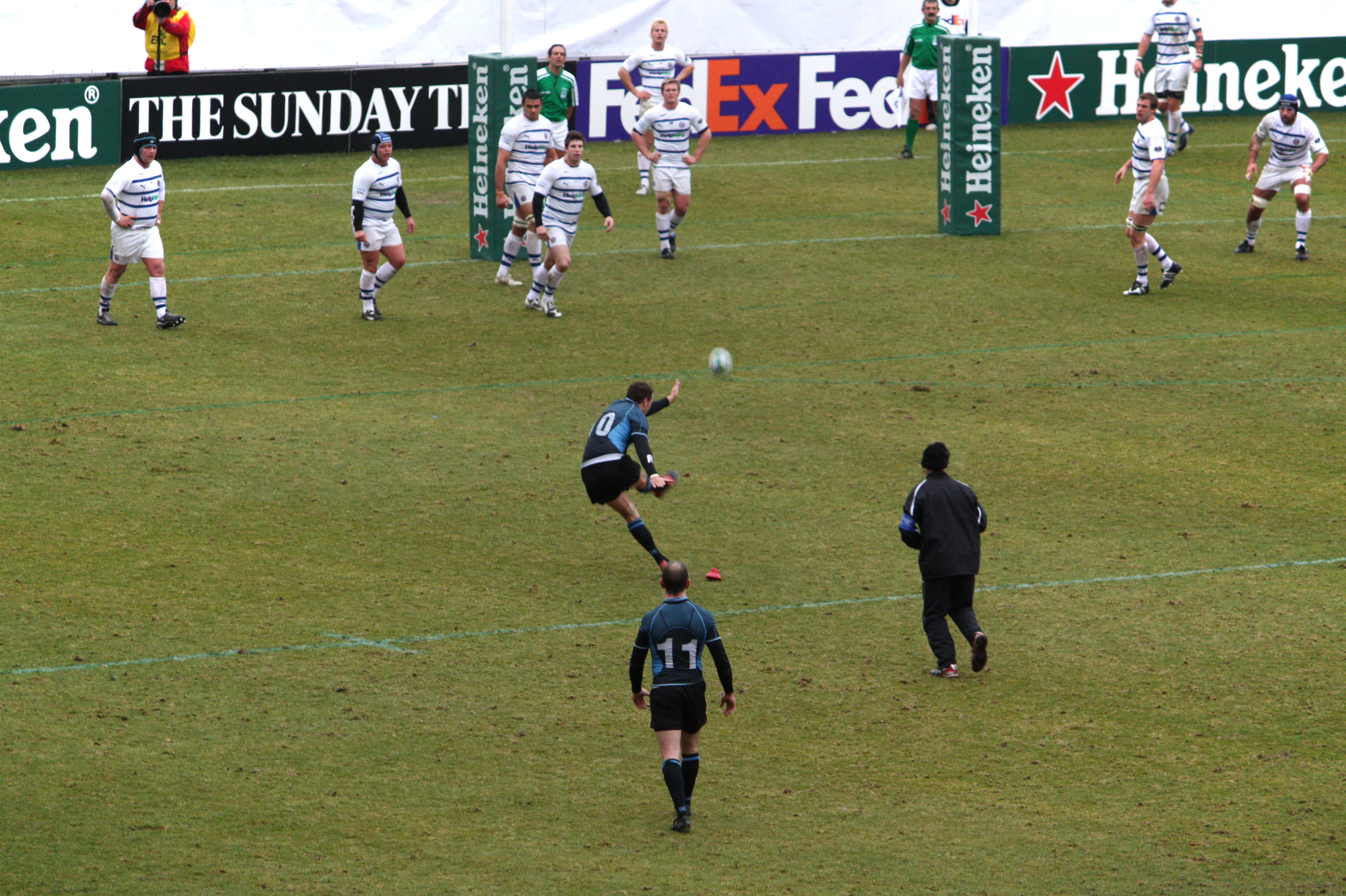
- Parks, kicking a penalty for the Glasgow Warriors.
- Born: Daniel Arthur Parks; 26 May 1978 (age 48) Hornsby, Australia
- Height: 1.80 m (5 ft 11 in)
- Weight: 91 kg (14 st 5 lb)
- School: Marsden High School

Rugby union career
- Position: Fly-half
Amateur team(s)
Years	Team	Apps	(Points)
-	West Harbour RUFC		
–	Southern Districts RUFC		
–	Eastern Suburbs RUFC		
Senior career
Years	Team	Apps	(Points)
2001	Leeds Tykes	6	(51)
2003–2010	Glasgow	146	(1530)
2010–2012	Cardiff Blues	38	(347)
2012–2014	Connacht	51	(367)
- Correct as of 10 May 2014
International career
Years	Team	Apps	(Points)
2004–2012	Scotland	67	(266)
- Correct as of 3 September 2015
Coaching career
- Years: Team
- 2015: Sydney Stars (Asst. Coach)
- 2016: West Harbour (Asst. Coach)
- 2016: Samoa (Skills Coach)

Daniel Arthur Parks (born 26 May 1978) is a professional rugby union coach and former player who played as a fly-half.

Parks played professionally for Pro12 sides Glasgow Warriors, Cardiff Blues and Connacht Rugby as well as English side Leeds Tykes. He secured international caps for Scotland from 2004 to 2012. Parks is also the record holder for points scored in the Pro12 with a combined total of 1,582 points. Parks announced his retirement from playing rugby on 25 June 2014.

== Youth and amateur career ==
Parks was brought up in Sydney, and early on he played rugby for West Harbour RUFC, Southern Districts RUFC and Eastern Suburbs RUFC which brought about the nickname "Compass". Parks also represented New South Wales at Under-21 level. During his playing days in the Sydney rugby union competition, Parks broke a long-standing point scoring record for the third fifteen's highest scoring replacement in a friendly game.

== Professional career ==
=== Leeds Tykes ===
After moving to England in September 2001 to pursue his professional rugby career, Parks spent some time at Leeds Tykes. Parks scored 51 points for the Tykes in his six games for the side before leaving for Eastern Suburbs.

=== Glasgow Warriors ===
In 2003 Parks moved to Scotland. He joined Glasgow Warriors, a professional team in the recently established Celtic League. After making his debut as a replacement in the Celtic Cup victory over Celtic Warriors at Bridgend in September 2003, Parks was quick to establish himself as the club's first choice fly-half, a position he held in all seven seasons that he played for the side and testament to his game-winning prowess. Parks was top points scorer for his club in every season he played for Glasgow from the 2003–04 to the 2009–10 season, scoring tries, conversions, penalties and drop goals.

This accumulation of points made Parks the highest all-time points scorer for the club. In what would be Glasgow's final match of the 2008–09 season, Parks attained the distinction of being the first ever player to reach 1,000 points in the Celtic League.

Parks was named Player of the Season in 2006–07 and in 2009–10. He was also named in the Pro12 Dream Team at the end of 2009–10. Over his Glasgow career, he made regular appearances for the Scotland national side, including in the Six Nations and the 2007 Rugby World Cup. For his World Cup performance, Parks was voted Scotland player of the tournament.

Parks' form for Glasgow Warriors was recognised by the Magners League with his inclusion as fly-half in the league's "Dream Team" for the 2009–10 season. His Glasgow Warriors teammates Alastair Kellock and John Barclay also featured, in addition to Edinburgh's Dutch winger Tim Visser.

Parks left Glasgow Warriors at the end of the 2009–10 season, leaving the team as record points scorer having amassed 1,531 points having scored 20 tries, 322 penalties, 188 conversions and 26 drop goals in 146 games. He also holds the distinction as being the League's all-time record points holder.

==== Personal controversy ====
On 19 April 2009, Parks was pulled over by police while driving on the M8 motorway between Glasgow and Edinburgh at 3:45 am. His blood alcohol levels were found to be over three times the legal limit. Parks was subsequently banned from driving for 18 months. His drunk driving coincided with poor form for Glasgow and omission from the Scottish team. Glasgow Warriors ordered Parks to train alone while his future was considered. After deliberation Parks was allowed to remain a Warrior, with Sean Lineen opting to give him a second chance.

=== Cardiff Blues ===
Having left Glasgow Warriors, Parks signed a two-year deal with Welsh side Cardiff Blues becoming the first Scotsman to play for them. Parks made his League debut for the Blues on 4 September 2010 in the 34–23 win against Edinburgh, Parks kicked 14 points and was awarded man of the match. In his first season with the Blues, Parks played in 13 league matches, making 11 starts, as well as playing five games in the 2010–11 Heineken Cup, all of them starts. He scored 18 conversions, 10 drop goals and 48 penalties in the two competitions for a total of 210 points.

In his second season with the club, Parks started less frequently in the league, which had been renamed as the Pro12. In the 2011–12 Pro12 he played 13 times, but only eight of these appearances came as starts. In the 2011–12 Heineken Cup however, Parks started all seven of Cardiff's matches as they qualified for the quarter-finals as best runners-up in the pool stages before being knocked out by the defending champions Leinster. In his 20 matches Parks scored 137 points, including scoring his first try for the side in a league game against Ulster. Parks left Cardiff at the end of the season.

=== Connacht ===
In February 2012 Parks signed for Galway based Pro12 team Connacht, joining the club for the start of the 2012–13 season on a two-year contract. Parks made his debut for Connacht in a 2012–13 Pro12 game against Irish rivals and Heineken Cup champions Leinster. Parks scored two conversions and a penalty all in the game as Connacht came out comfortable winners by a score of 34–6. He made his Heineken Cup debut against Italian side Zebre. Parks played in 17 games for Connacht in the Pro12 that season, starting on each occasion and also started five of the team's games in the 2012–13 Heineken Cup, including a win over French giants Biarritz by a final score of 22–14, in which Parks kicked three penalties, two drop goals and a conversion.

In the following season, Parks continued to be a regular player for Connacht. He featured in all of the team's 22 games in the 2013–14 Pro12, with 14 of these appearances coming as starts, and scored his only Connacht try in a match against Ulster. In the 2013–14 Heineken Cup Parks featured in all six of Connacht's matches, with all but one of these appearances coming as starts. This included an historic victory over the four time European champions Toulouse. Parks scored 157 points in the two competitions over the course of the season. In April 2014, it was announced that Parks would not have his contract renewed and would leave the province at the end of the season. Following his release from Connacht, Parks announced his retirement from all professional rugby.

== International career ==
Parks qualified to play for Scotland via his maternal grandfather who was born in Kilbirnie, Ayrshire.

=== 2004–2008 ===
He made his Scotland debut in February 2004 against Wales. He also played in all three 2005 Autumn tests, his positive attitude and commitment won praise from coach Frank Hadden. Parks' fortunes improved along with those of the Scotland team who enjoyed more success in the 2005–2006 season.

Despite being the choice No.10 for Scottish national coach Matt Williams and his successor Frank Hadden, Parks appeared to have had a difficult time fitting into this role on occasion, such as in the 2008 Six Nations games against England and Italy. However, in the Scottish tour of Argentina in 2008 he scored a break away try to secure the second test victory, levelling the series 1–1.

Parks played for Scotland in the Six Nations, the 2007 Rugby World Cup, and on tours to Australia in 2004, South Africa in 2006 and Argentina in 2008, but his poor form for Glasgow Warriors and off-field issues lead to him being axed from the Scotland set up throughout 2009.

=== 2010–2012 ===
After enduring an 18-month international exile he was recalled to the Scotland squad for the match 2010 Six Nations Championship tie against Wales.

Parks made his return against the Welsh and went on to win an unprecedented three-man-of-the-match awards in four games, being chosen against Wales, Italy and Ireland. Parks regained much of the self-belief and confidence that he had previously played with for his club but which often eluded him while playing for Scotland. Parks praised Scottish coach Andy Robinson, saying "he has been a big contributor to the improvement in the Scotland team." His strong performances helped him win over a number of fans and members of the media who had previously been critical of his performances for the national team. Even one of the most hardened critics of Parks, Scottish journalist Alan Massie, gave recognition to the outstanding performances by Parks in the championship. As testament to his first-class performances throughout the 2010 Six Nations he featured in many writers' team of the tournament.

Parks continued his fine form for Scotland playing an integral role in securing a 2–0 series victory in the 2010 tour of Argentina. This was Scotland's first ever capped series victory in 50 years of touring. In addition, it was the first time in 26 years that Scotland have won three away internationals in a row. Parks then went on to score all 21 points in Scotland's 21–17 upset win over South Africa with six penalties and a drop-goal.

Parks outlined his desire to add to his 53 caps in the November internationals against New Zealand, South Africa and Samoa and in the 2011 RWC. "I've got 53 caps now and I want to build on that. My goal is to get to the World Cup to represent Scotland there." (Interview with BBC Scotland 28 August 2010)

On 10 May 2011, Parks was named in Scotland's provisional 40-man squad for the 2011 World Cup.

Parks made his first Rugby World Cup 2011 appearance in the 15–6 victory over Georgia where he scored all of the points, with four penalties and a drop goal. In landing his drop goal in the 37th minute Parks furthered his Scottish drop goal record to 15.

In the last minute of the game against Argentina, which Los Pumas won 13–12, Parks missed an attempted drop goal which would have won the match for his team. Following this match there was also criticism of his tactical sense, given he had earlier attempted and scored a drop goal, despite Scotland having advantage close to the try line.

Following wide criticism of his performance in the first match of the 2012 Six Nations against England, Parks announced his immediate retirement from international rugby on 7 February 2012.

== Awards and records ==
- Scotland Player's Player of the World Cup 2007
- Glasgow Warriors Player of the season 2006–07 and 2009–10
- Glasgow Warriors record point scorer (1531 points)
- Glasgow Warriors record appearance holder (143 games)
- Pro12 record point scorer (1,582 points)(As of 10 May 2014))
- 2009–10 Celtic League Dream Team fly-half
- Most drop goals for Scotland (15)
