= Kevin Tkachuk =

Canada international rugby union player

Kevin Brian Tkachuk
- Born: Kevin Brian Tkachuk; 11 September 1976 (age 50) Thompson, Manitoba, Canada
- Height: 182 cm (6 ft 0 in)
- Weight: 116 kg (256 lb)
- University: Oxford University

Rugby union career
- Position: Prop
Senior career
Years	Team	Apps	(Points)
2003–2004	Pertemps Bees	16	(20)
2004–2011	Glasgow Warriors	152	(67)
International career
Years	Team	Apps	(Points)
2000–2010	Canada	55	(25)

Kevin Tkachuk (born September 11, 1976) is a former prop for the Canada national rugby union team and the Glasgow Warriors in Scotland.

After completing his studies at Kellogg College, Oxford University, he played rugby for numerous clubs, joining Glasgow in 2004. He has earned 34 caps for Canada including 5 as captain. He is 1.8m tall and weighs 115 kg.

Tkachuk has spent the summer playing for Canada, firstly in the Churchill Cup and then in the World Cup qualifiers. Tkachuk joined up at Glasgow in 2004 after completing his studies at Oxford University. He has played for Oxford in the varsity matches from 2001 to 2003, and scored a try for them against Australia.

The Canadian international prop joined Glasgow from Pertemps Bees and made a big impact in his first season at Hughenden. He captained Canada five times in 2004 and 2005 and made his debut for the Barbarians in May 2006 in the Murrayfield match against Scotland......

Only a few days before that match he was named Glasgow Warriors’ Player of the Year at the Scottish Rugby Awards Dinner. Later that year he returned to Canada’s team for the 56–7 win against USA in the World Cup qualifying match in St John’s, Newfoundland.

His first try for Glasgow was in the Celtic League victory against Ulster at Hughenden in October 2004, and he scored a second in the home win against Connacht two months later.

Tkachuk has also played for Campion Grads, Saskatchewan Prairie Fire (Rugby Canada Super League team), the Capilano and Castaway Wanderers clubs in British Columbia, and Henley Hawks in England. Former wrestler, gridiron player and speed skater, Tkachuk was noted for his strength, mobility and commitment.

In 2016, Tkachuk became the rugby coach for St. Joseph's Preparatory School in Philadelphia, Pennsylvania.

Tkachuk became the Football coach and history teacher at The Hill School in Pottstown, Pennsylvania in 2018. In 2025, Tkachuk gained his US citizenship, making him a dual citizen of Canada and The United States.
