= Johnnie Beattie =

Scotland international rugby union player

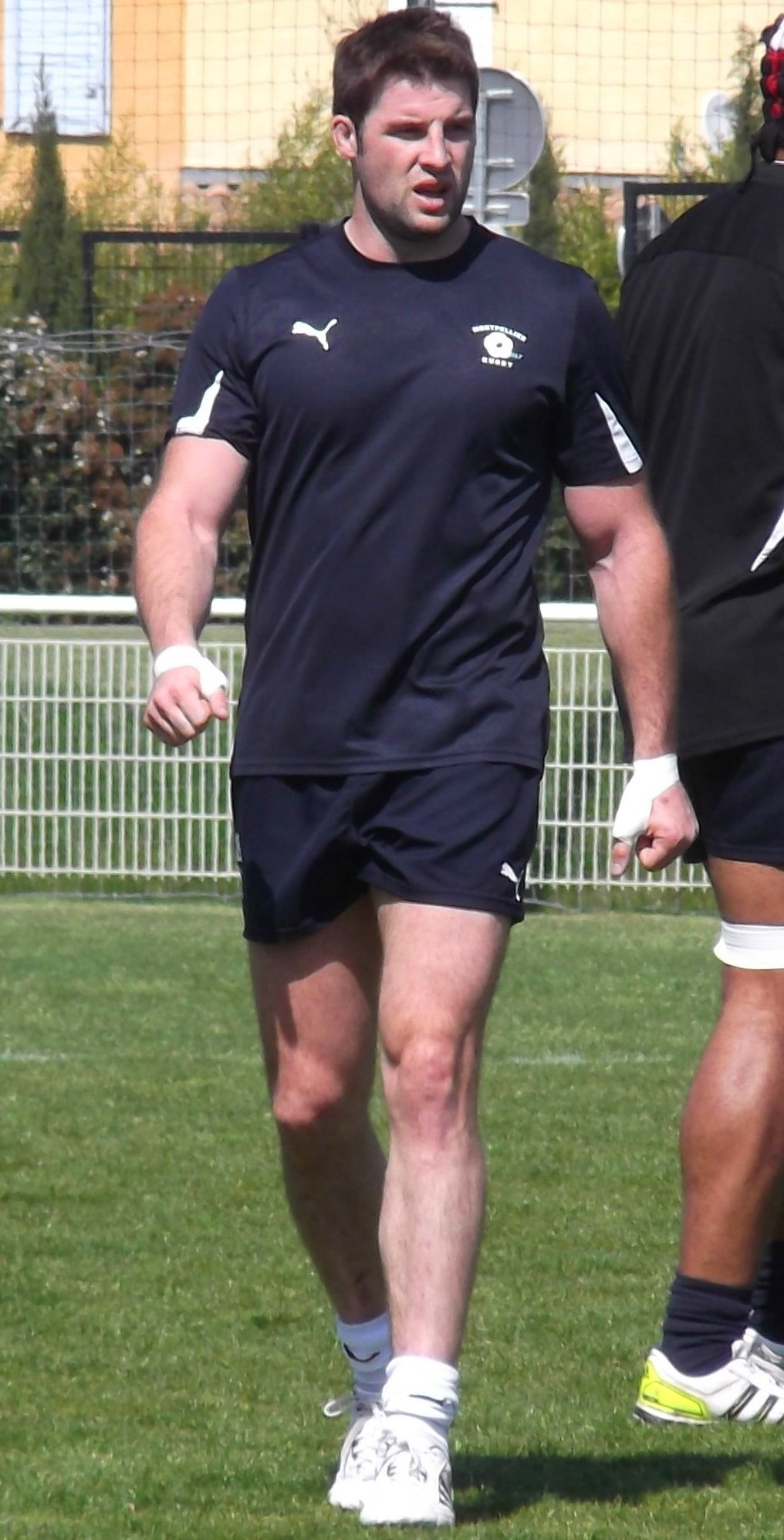
- Beattie in 2013
- Born: John William Beattie; 21 November 1985 (age 40) Glasgow, Scotland
- Height: 6 ft 4 in (1.93 m)
- Weight: 16 st 10 lb (106 kg)
- School: Jordanhill School, The Glasgow Academy
- University: Scottish Institute of Sport, Glasgow University
- Notable relative(s): John Beattie (father); Jen Beattie (sister)

Rugby union career
- Position: Flanker / Number Eight
Senior career
Years	Team	Apps	(Points)
2004–2012	Glasgow Warriors	137	(65)
2012–2014	Montpellier	42	(20)
2014–2016	Castres	40	(15)
2016–2020	Bayonne	46	(5)
International career
Years	Team	Apps	(Points)
2006–2015	Scotland	38	(15)

John William Beattie (born 21 November 1985) is a Scottish former rugby union player. A number 8, he played for Glasgow Warriors, Montpellier, Castres and Bayonne.

== Background ==
Beattie is the son of former Scotland number 8 John Beattie and brother of Scotland women's footballer Jen Beattie. He was educated at The Glasgow Academy, and played age group rugby for Glasgow and Scotland. As a youth, Beattie also represented Scotland at cricket and played football for the Rangers youth team.

== International career ==
Beattie gained his first cap against Romania on 18 November 2006.

He was named in the XV for the standout performers of the 2010 Six Nations Championship by Planet Rugby.

He won 38 caps in total scoring 3 tries.

In January 2020, Beattie announced his retirement from rugby.

== Post-retirement ==
Beattie hosts Le French Rugby Podcast, a rugby podcast about French rugby with Benjamin Kayser.
