= Scotland national under-21 rugby union team =

Scotland Under 21
- Union: Scottish Rugby Union
Team kit	Change kit

The Scotland national under-21 rugby union team was one of several junior national rugby union teams behind the Scottish national side.

It has now been disbanded and replaced by the under-20 side.

The Under 21 side that faced Ireland Under 21 in the 2004-05 Six Nations Championship:

- Brian Archibald (Stirling County)
- Ben Addison (Stirling County)
- Nick De Luca (Heriot's)
- Garry Law (Hawick)
- Steven Manning (Ayr)
- David Blair (Sale Sharks)
- Alasdhair McFarlane (GHA)
- Ross Ford (The Borders and The Scottish Institute of Sport)
- Stuart Fenwick (Ayr)
- Ian Nimmo (Heriot's)
- Stuart Walker (Newcastle Falcons)
- Colin White (Stirling County)
- Scott Forrest (Glasgow Hawks)
- Neil Cochrane (Watsonians) (Capt)
