= 2006–07 Glasgow Warriors season =

Glasgow Warriors
- Ground: Hughenden Stadium (Capacity: 6,000)
- Coach: (Scotland) Sean Lineen
- Captain: (Scotland) Alastair Kellock
- Top scorer: (Scotland) Dan Parks (284)
- Most tries: (Scotland) Hefin O'Hare (Scotland) Rory Lamont (8)
- League: Celtic League (7th)
1st kit	2nd kit

The 2006–07 season saw Glasgow Warriors compete in the Celtic League and the European Challenge Cup.

== Season overview ==
After impressive preseason displays, Glasgow Warriors played its first game in the new Celtic League against Newport Gwent Dragons, losing 23–24 after a last minute penalty.

Glasgow then did not lose another home game until Ulster came to Hughenden in January 2007. Glasgow drew away to English side Saracens in the European Challenge Cup, en route to a quarter-final berth, but was drawn against Saracens and lost 23–19 at Vicarage Road.

The Warriors defeated both Scottish rivals, Edinburgh and Border Reivers, just a week apart, and at the start of April title hopefuls Leinster arrived at Hughenden. Glasgow won the game 26–20, before following it up with a good away win against Irish side Connacht. The next game saw Glasgow travel to Ravenhill to face Ulster, one of only 2 sides to beat them at Hughenden, and the team stunned the home crowd by winning the game.

Then it was the turn of Welsh side, the Neath–Swansea Ospreys (a side that would win the title at Netherdale the following week) to travel to Hughenden. The Ospreys crossed the Glasgow try line within 45 seconds, and crossed twice more to take a (26–9) lead just minutes from half-time, before Glasgow's Dan Parks converted his own try to take it to 26–16 at half time. In the second half, Parks kicked another penalty before setting up Graeme Morrison for a try, which he converted to level the scores. Parks kicked a penalty from just shy of the half-way line to take a three-point lead and the Ospreys couldn't find a way out of their own half for the remaining 20 minutes.

The Warriors failed to make it five in a row the following week, but coach Sean Lineen was happy with his team's performance over the season nonetheless.

== Team ==
=== Coaches ===
- Gary Mercer, defence coach

=== Squad ===
Hookers (Scotland) Eric Milligan (Scotland) Scott Lawson (Scotland) Fergus Thomson Props (Scotland) Stuart Corsar (Scotland) Euan Murray (Scotland) Ben Prescott (Canada) Kevin Tkachuk (Samoa) Justin Va'a Locks (Scotland) Alastair Kellock (Wales) Andy Newman (Scotland) Dan Turner	Loose forwards (Scotland) John Barclay (Scotland) Johnnie Beattie (Scotland) James Eddie (Scotland) Donnie Macfadyen (Scotland) Jon Petrie (Scotland) Steve Swindall (Scotland) Andrew Wilson Scrum-halves (Scotland) Graeme Beveridge (Scotland) Colin Gregor (Scotland) Sam Pinder (Scotland) Calum Cusiter Fly-halves (Scotland) Mike Adamson (Scotland) Dan Parks	Centres (England) Scott Barrow (Scotland) Max Evans (Scotland) Andrew Henderson (Scotland) Graeme Morrison Back three (Scotland) Thom Evans (Scotland) Rory Lamont (Scotland) Hefin O'Hare (Scotland) Sean Marsden (England) Mike Roberts (Scotland) Colin Shaw (Argentina) Francisco Leonelli

==== Academy players ====
- (Scotland) Willie Brown – Prop
- (Scotland) Moray Low – Prop
- (Scotland) Pat MacArthur – Hooker
- (Scotland) Allan Kelly – Lock
- (Scotland) Calum Forrester – Flanker
- (Scotland) Colin White – Flanker
- (Scotland) Jamie Hunter – Scrum-half
- (Scotland) Ruaridh Jackson – Fly-half
- (Scotland) Ben Addison – Wing

==== Back up players ====
Other players used by Glasgow Warriors over the course of the season.

- (Zimbabwe) Nico Nyemba (Hillhead Jordanhill) – Hooker
- (Scotland) Ross McCallum (Glasgow Hawks) – Tighthead Prop
- (Scotland) Andy Dunlop (Biggar) – Flanker
- (Scotland) Andrew Rennick (unattached) – Flanker
- (Scotland) Ryan Moffat (Cartha Queens Park) – Fly-half
- (Scotland) Alan Gibbon (Cartha Queens Park) – Centre
- (Uganda) Tony Nyangweso (Cartha Queens Park) – Centre
- (Scotland) Stevie Gordon (Glasgow Hawks) – Wing
- (Scotland) Rory Watson (Glasgow Hutchesons Aloysians) – Wing

== Player statistics ==
During the 2006–07 season, Glasgow used 34 different players in competitive games. The table below shows the number of appearances and points scored by each player.

Position	Nation	Name	Celtic League			Challenge Cup			Total	
Position	Nation	Name	Apps (sub)	Tries	Points kicked	Apps (sub)	Tries	Points kicked	Apps (sub)	Total pts
HK	(Scotland)	Scott Lawson	3(8)	0	0	3(2)	0	0	6(10)	0
HK	(Scotland)	Eric Milligan	(6)	0	0	(2)	0	0	(8)	0
HK	(Scotland)	Fergus Thomson	17(2)	1	0	4(2)	0	0	21(4)	5
PR	(Scotland)	Moray Low	8(1)	0	0	2	0	0	10(1)	0
PR	(Scotland)	Euan Murray	10	0	0	5	0	0	15	0
PR	(Scotland)	Ben Prescott	(2)	0	0	0	0	0	(2)	0
PR	(Canada)	Kevin Tkachuk	4(16)	0	0	2(5)	2	0	6(21)	30
PR	(Samoa)	Justin Va'a	18(1)	0	0	5(2)	0	0	23(3)	0
LK	(Scotland)	Alastair Kellock	19	1	0	7	0	0	26	5
LK	(Wales)	Andy Newman	17(2)	1	0	6(1)	0	0	23(3)	5
LK	(Scotland)	Dan Turner	4(9)	1	0	1(5)	0	0	5(14)	5
BR	(Scotland)	John Barclay	18(2)	4	0	7	0	0	25(2)	20
BR	(Scotland)	Johnnie Beattie	14	2	0	4	0	0	18	10
BR	(Scotland)	James Eddie	1(5)	0	0	(2)	0	0	1(7)	0
BR	(Scotland)	Calum Forrester	(1)	0	0	(1)	0	0	(2)	0
BR	(Scotland)	Donnie Macfadyen	3(7)	0	0	(2)	0	0	3(9)	0
BR	(Scotland)	Jon Petrie	7	1	0	3(1)	0	0	10(1)	5
BR	(Scotland)	Steve Swindall	7(7)	2	0	3(3)	1	0	10(10)	15
BR	(Scotland)	Andrew Wilson	10(7)	0	0	4(2)	0	0	14(9)	0
SH	(Scotland)	Graeme Beveridge	18(1)	0	0	7	1	0	25(1)	5
SH	(Scotland)	Sam Pinder	2(10)	2	0	(3)	4	0	2(13)	30
FH	(Scotland)	Colin Gregor	6(9)	1	44	1(3)	0	2	7(12)	51
FH	(Scotland)	Ruaridh Jackson	0	0	0	(1)	0	4	(1)	4
FH	(Scotland)	Dan Parks	16(3)	4	177	7	0	87	23(3)	284
CE	(England)	Scott Barrow	9(4)	0	0	4	2	0	13(4)	10
CE	(Scotland)	Graeme Morrison	12(1)	4	0	3	1	0	15(1)	25
CE	(Scotland)	Andrew Henderson	15(1)	0	0	6	2	0	21(1)	10
WG	(Scotland)	Thom Evans	19	4	0	6	2	0	25	30
WG	(Scotland)	Hefin O'Hare	15(4)	4	0	6(1)	4	0	21(5)	40
WG	(England)	Mike Roberts	1	0	0	0	0	0	1	0
WG	(Scotland)	Colin Shaw	3(1)	1	0	(1)	0	0	3(2)	5
FB	(Scotland)	Rory Lamont	14	3	0	7	5	0	21	40
FB	(Argentina)	Francisco Leonelli	7	1	3	1	1	0	8	13
FB	(Scotland)	Sean Marsden	3(3)	0	0	1(1)	1	0	4(4)	5

== Staff movements ==
=== Coaches ===
==== Personnel out ====
- (England) Mark Bitcon to Scotland

=== Staff ===
==== Personnel in ====
- Charles Shaw – chairman from (Scotland) Greenock
- Archie Ferguson – Board Member
- Bill Nolan – Board Member
- John Lynch (Glasgow City Councillor) – Board Member

== Player movements ==
=== Academy promotions ===
- (Scotland) Stuart Corsar

=== Player transfers ===
==== In ====
- (Argentina) Francisco Leonelli from (Scotland) Edinburgh
- (Scotland) Alastair Kellock from (Scotland) Edinburgh
- (Scotland) Calum Cusiter from (Scotland) Border Reivers (loan)

==== Out ====
- (Scotland) Calum Cusiter to (Scotland) Border Reivers (loan ends)
- (Scotland) Gregor Hayter to (England) Newbury

== Competitions ==
=== Pre-season and friendlies ===
==== Match 1 ====
11 August 2006
16:00

Glasgow Warriors (Scotland)	55–5	(England) Moseley
Try: Thom Evans (3); Graeme Morrison; John Barclay; Johnnie Beattie; Hefin O'Hare; Ben Addison; Andrew Henderson; Con: Dan Parks (4); Mike Adamson	Preview; Report; Report	Try: Neil Mason

Whitecraigs

Glasgow Warriors: Justin Va'a, Eric Milligan, Euan Murray, Andy Newman, Dan Turner, Steve Swindall, John Barclay, Jon Petrie, Graeme Beveridge, Dan Parks, Thom Evans, Scott Barrow, Graeme Morrison, Hefin O'Hare, Colin Shaw
Replacements: Stuart Corsar, James Eddie, John Beattie, Andy Wilson, Mike Roberts, Andrew Henderson, Willie Brown, Moray Low, Allan Kelly, Calum Forrester, Jamie Hunter, Ruaridh Jackson, Ben Addison, Pat MacArthur, Mike Adamson

Moseley:
Replacements:

==== Match 2 ====
18 August 2006
16:30

Glasgow Warriors (Scotland)	21–7	(England) Newcastle Falcons
Try: Colin Shaw; Ruaridh Jackson; Moray Low; Con: Ruaridh Jackson (2); Mike Adamson	Preview; Report; Report; Report	Try: Brent Wilson; Con: Toby Flood

Burnbrae
Attendance: 1843
Referee: Graham Knox (Greenock Wanderers)

Glasgow Warriors: Stuart Corsar, Eric Milligan, Moray Low, Allan Kelly, Dan Turner, Calum Forrester, Andy Wilson, John Barclay,
Graeme Beveridge, Ruaridh Jackson, Colin Shaw, Scott Barrow, Hefin O'Hare, Ben Addison, Sean Marsden
Replacements: Alan Gibbon (Cartha Queen's Park), Ryan Moffat (Cartha Queen's Park), Mike Adamson, Jamie Hunter, James Eddie,
Pat MacArthur, Willie Brown, Andy Dunlop (Biggar), Andy Rennick (unattached). (all used)

Newcastle Falcons: 15 Anthony Elliott, 14 Cameron Johnston, 13 Tom Dillon, 12 Mark Mayerhofler, 11 Jack Harrison, 10 Toby Flood, 9 Hall Charlton (captain), 1 Jon Golding, 2 Matt Thompson, 3 Robbie Morris, 4 Sean Tomes, 5 Stuart Walker, 6 Brent Wilson, 7 Cory Harris, 8 Greg Irvin
Replacements: Oliver Tomazszcek, Ross Batty, Phil Dawson, Tim Visser, Ed Williamson, Tom Jokelson, Adam Dehaty, Mark Laycock, Michael Young

==== Match 3 ====
18 August 2006
18:30

Glasgow Warriors (Scotland)	13–7	(England) Newcastle Falcons
Try: Donnie Macfadyen; Con: Dan Parks; Pen: Dan Parks (2)	Preview; Report; Report; Report	Try: Ollie Phillips; Con: Jonny Wilkinson

Burnbrae
Attendance: Andy Ireland
Referee: 1843

Glasgow Warriors: Justin Va'a, Fergus Thomson, Euan Murray, Andy Newman, Alastair Kellock, Steve Swindall, Donnie Macfadyen,
John Beattie, Sam Pinder, Dan Parks, Mike Roberts, Andrew Henderson, Graeme Morrison, Thom Evans, Francisco Leonelli
Replacements: Colin Shaw, Hefin O'Hare. Kevin Tkachuk, Jon Petrie, Stuart Corsar, Dan Turner, Andy Wilson, John Barclay (all used)

Newcastle Falcons: 15 Matthew Burke (captain), 14 John Rudd, 13 Jamie Noon, 12 Joe Shaw, 11 Ollie Phillips, 10 Jonny Wilkinson, 9 James Grindal, 1 Micky Ward, 2 Andy Long, 3 David Wilson, 4 Andy Perry, 5 Andy Buist, 6 Mike McCarthy, 7 Ben Woods, 8 Phil Dowson
Replacements:

==== Match 4 ====
25 August 2006
20:00

Newcastle Falcons (England)	19–8	(Scotland) Glasgow Warriors
Try: Anthony Elliott; Joe Shaw; Phil Dowson; Con: Jonny Wilkinson; Toby Flood	Preview; Report; Report	Try: Graeme Morrison; Pen: Dan Parks

Kingston Park
Attendance: Dave Pearson
Referee: 2,884

Glasgow Warriors: Justin Va'a, Fergus Thomson, Euan Murray, Andy Newman, Alastair Kellock, Steve Swindall, Donnie Macfadyen, Jon Petrie, Sam Pinder, Dan Parks, Mike Roberts, Andrew Henderson, Graeme Morrison, Thom Evans, Francisco Leonelli
Replacements: Colin Shaw, Hefin O'Hare, Jamie Hunter, Ruaridh Jackson, Scott Barrow, Kevin Tkachuk, James Eddie, Dan Turner, Andy Wilson, John Barclay, Eric Milligan

Newcastle Falcons: M Burke (capt); J Shaw, J Noon, T Flood, A Elliott; J Wilkinson, H Charlton; M Ward, A Long, D Wilson, A Perry, A Buist, M McCarthy, P Dowson, C Harris
Replacements (all used): J Golding, R Morris, M Thompson, J Oakes, B Wilson, B Woods, J Grindal, T Dillon, T Visser, J Rudd

==== Match 5 ====
18 September 2006
16:00

Glasgow Warriors (Scotland)	13–5	(Scotland) Edinburgh
Try: Scott Barrow; Sam Pinder; Pen: Mike Adamson	Preview; Report; Report	Try: Fergus Pringle

Whitecraigs

Glasgow Warriors: Stuart Corsar, Scott Lawson, Ben Prescott, James Eddie, Dan Turner, Steve Swindall, Andy Dunlop, Calum Forrester, Jamie Hunter, Colin Gregor, Mike Adamson, Scott Barrow, Graeme Morrison, Ben Addison, Sean Marsden
Replacements: Tony Nyangweso (Cartha QP), Ryan Moffat (Cartha QP), Ruaridh Jackson, Sam Pinder, Colin White, Willie Brown, Allan Kelly, Moray Low, Eric Milligan (all used)

Edinburgh Rugby: D McCall, P Jorgensen, M Dey, R Kerr (Glasgow Hawks); A Monro, G Laidlaw; K Traynor, AKelly, A Dymock, D Duley, S Turnbull, A MacDonald, DCallam, S Cross.
Replacements: A Warnock (Currie), P Louden (Edinburgh Academical), A Easson, C Ferguson, R Samson (Tynedale), S Lawrie, I Brown, F McKenzie, F Pringle, RWeston (Currie).

==== Match 6 ====
2 October 2006
17:00

Border Reivers (Scotland)	12–34	(Scotland) Glasgow Warriors
Try: Callum Anderson; Richie Vernon; Con: Graham Hogg	Preview; Report; Report	Try: Kevin Tkachuk; Calum Forrester (2); Mike Roberts; Ben Addison; Tony Nyangweso

Netherdale

Border Reivers:
Replacements:

Glasgow Warriors: Rory Lamont, Ben Addison, Mike Adamson (Glasgow Hawks), Scott Barrow [capt], Mike Roberts, Ruaridh Jackson,
Jamie Hunter, Kevin Tkachuk, Eric Milligan, Ben Prescott, Allan Kelly, Dan Turner, Colin White, Calum Forrester, Steve Swindall
Replacements: Stuart Corsar, Moray Low, Pat MacArthur (Ayr), Willie Brown, Andy Dunlop (Biggar), Stuart McGee (Boroughmuir), Ryan Moffat (Cartha QP) Tony Nyangweso (Cartha QP) (all used)

==== Match 7 ====
13 November 2006
17:00

Scotland U20	19–33	(Scotland) Glasgow Warriors
Try: penalty try Colin Goudie; Danny Levison; Con: ?	Preview; Report; Report	Try: Mike Adamson; Moray Low; Colin Gregor; Max Evans; Calum Cusiter; Con: Mike Adamson (4)

Meggetland Sports Complex

Scotland U20:
Replacements from

Glasgow Warriors: 15. Colin Shaw 14. Ben Addison 13. Sean Marsden 12. Scott Barrow 11. Mike Adamson 10. Ruaridh Jackson
9. Calum Cusiter, 1. Stuart Corsar 2. Nico Nyemba 3. Moray Low 4. Allan Kelly 5. Richie Gray 6. Colin White 7. Steve Swindall 8. Calum Forrester
Replacements: Willie Brown, Andy Dunlop, Max Evans, Colin Gregor, Stuart McGee, Ryan Moffat, Neil Robertson, Joe Stafford, Dan Turner

==== Match 8 ====
27 November 2006
15:30

Border Reivers (Scotland)	7–24	(Scotland) Glasgow Warriors
Try: John Coutts; Con: Gregor Townsend	[ Preview] Report; Report; Report	Try: Sam Pinder; Max Evans; Colin Gregor; Ben Prescott; Con: Colin Gregor

Netherdale

Border Reivers: James Thomson (Heriot's); Nick De Luca, John Houston (Heriot's), Bryan Rennie, Dougie Flockhart; Gregor Townsend,
Calum Cusiter; Bruce McNeil, Steve Scott, Geoff Cross, Dave Duley (Edinburgh Rugby), Stuart Grimes, Fergus Pringle (Edinburgh Rugby),
Andy Millar, Richie Vernon
Replacements: Graham Hogg, Rob Chrystie, Ryan Grant, Nick Hart (Watsonians), Ed Kalman, Torrie Callander (Watsonians),
John Coutts (Hawick), Callum Anderson (Melrose)

Glasgow Warriors: Sean Marsden; Max Evans, Hefin O'Hare, Scott Barrow, Colin Shaw; Colin Gregor, Sam Pinder; Stuart Corsar, Eric Milligan, Ben Prescott, Andy Newman, Dan Turner, Steve Swindall, John Barclay, Colin White
Replacements: Willie Brown, Andy Dunlop (Biggar), James Eddie, Allan Kelly, Ross McCallum (Glasgow Hawks), Fergus Thomson
Andrew Wilson, Graeme Beveridge, Stevie Gordon (Glasgow Hawks), Jamie Hunter, Ryan Moffat (Cartha QP), Tony Nyangweso (Cartha QP), Rory Watson (GHA)

==== Match 9 ====
20 March 2007
19:00

Glasgow Warriors (Scotland)	14–14	(Scotland) Glasgow Hawks
Try: Thom Evans; Justin Va'a; Con: Colin Gregor (2)	Preview [ Report] Report	Try: Ricky Munday; Ally Maclay; Con: Mike Adamson (2)

Old Anniesland

Glasgow Warriors: Justin Va'a, Fergus Thomson, Moray Low, Andy Newman, Dan Turner, Steve Swindall, Andy Wilson, Colin White,
Jamie Hunter, Colin Gregor, Thom Evans, Scott Barrow, Graeme Morrison, Hefin O'Hare, Colin Shaw
Replacements: Eric Milligan, Ben Prescott, Kevin Tkachuk, Ben Prescott, Scott Lawson, James Eddie, Calum Forrester, Ben Addison, Max Evans, Sean Marsden

Glasgow Hawks:
Replacements:

=== Celtic League ===
==== Table ====
	Team	Pld	W	D	L	PF	PA	PD	TF	TA	Try bonus	Losing bonus	Pts
1	(Wales) Ospreys	20	14	0	6	461	374	+87	49	32	4	4	64
2	(Wales) Cardiff Blues	20	13	1	6	447	327	+120	53	33	6	3	63
3	(Ireland) Leinster	20	12	1	7	472	376	+96	54	37	7	4	61
4	(Wales) Llanelli Scarlets	20	12	0	8	490	417	+73	61	41	9	0	57
5	(Ireland) Ulster	20	11	1	8	423	310	+113	45	31	4	5	55
6	(Ireland) Munster	20	12	0	8	379	294	+85	37	31	3	3	54
7	(Scotland) Glasgow Warriors	20	11	0	9	434	419	+15	42	49	3	2	49
8	(Scotland) Edinburgh	20	8	1	11	335	423	−88	31	45	2	6	42
9	(Wales) Newport Gwent Dragons	20	8	0	12	353	362	−9	36	43	1	6	39
10	(Ireland) Connacht	20	4	2	14	326	474	−148	30	48	2	4	26
11	(Scotland) Border Reivers	20	2	0	18	201	545	−344	16	64	0	4	12
Under the standard bonus point system, points are awarded as follows: 4 points for a win; 2 points for a draw; 1 bonus point for scoring 4 tries (or more) (Try bonus); 1 bonus point for losing by 7 points (or fewer) (Losing bonus)
Source: RaboDirect PRO12

==== Results ====
Each team played 20 matches in the league. That meant each team would have two bye weeks during the 22-round league season.

===== Round 1 =====
1 September 2006
19:30

Glasgow Warriors (Scotland)	23–24	(Wales) Newport Gwent Dragons
Try: Graeme Morrison; Sam Pinder; Con: Dan Parks (2); Pen: Dan Parks (2); Colin Gregor	Preview; Report; Report; Report	Try: Ceri Sweeney; Aled Brew; Con: Ceri Sweeney; Pen: Ceri Sweeney (3); Drop: Mike Hercus

Hughenden Stadium
Attendance: 1,653
Referee: Peter Fitzgibbon (Ireland)

===== Round 2 =====
8 September 2006
19:10

Llanelli Scarlets (Wales)	31–17	(Scotland) Glasgow Warriors
Try: Dwayne Peel; Darren Daniel (3); Gavin Evans; Con: Stephen Jones (3)	Preview; Report; Report; Report	Try: John Barclay; Colin Shaw; Con: Dan Parks (2); Drop: Francisco Leonelli

Stradey Park
Attendance: 6,366
Referee: George Clancy (Ireland)

===== Round 3 =====
15 September 2006
19:30

Glasgow Warriors (Scotland)	24–13	(Ireland) Munster
Try: Dan Parks; Thom Evans; Con: Dan Parks; Pen: Dan Parks (4)	Preview; Report; Report; Report	Try: Tomás O'Leary; Con: Eoghan Hickey; Pen: Jeremy Manning (2)

Hughenden Stadium
Attendance: 2,295
Referee: Nigel Owens (Wales)

===== Round 4 =====
22 September 2006
18:40

Cardiff Blues (Wales)	27–9	(Scotland) Glasgow Warriors
Try: Tom Shanklin; Ben Blair; Mosese Luveitasau; Con: Ben Blair (3); Pen: Ben Blair (2)	Preview; Report; Report; Report	Pen: Dan Parks (3)

Cardiff Arms Park
Attendance: 6,326
Referee: Alan Rolland (Ireland)

===== Round 5 =====
29 September 2006
19:30

Edinburgh (Scotland)	14–9	(Scotland) Glasgow Warriors
Try: Hugo Southwell; Pen: Chris Paterson (2); Drop: Duncan Hodge	Preview; Report; Report; Report	Pen: Dan Parks (2); Drop: Colin Gregor

Murrayfield
Attendance: 4,342
Referee: Malcolm Changleng (Scotland)

===== Round 6 =====
6 October 2006
19:30

Glasgow Warriors (Scotland)	25–0	(Scotland) Border Reivers
Try: Thom Evans; Con: Colin Gregor; Pen: Colin Gregor (6)	Preview; Report; Report; Report

Hughenden Stadium
Attendance: 1,967
Referee: Peter Allan (Watsonians)

===== Round 7 =====
13 October 2006
19:10

Ospreys (Wales)	26–9	(Scotland) Glasgow Warriors
Try: Shane Williams; Sonny Parker; Steve Tandy; Nikki Walker; Con: Gavin Henson (3)	Preview; Report; Report; Report	Pen: Colin Gregor (3)

Liberty Stadium
Attendance: 6,288
Referee: Alan Lewis (Ireland)

===== Round 8 =====
3 November 2006
19:30

Glasgow Warriors (Scotland)	39–34	(Ireland) Connacht
Try: Dan Parks; Alastair Kellock; Graeme Morrison; John Barclay; Francisco Leonelli; Con: Dan Parks (4); Pen: Dan Parks (2)	Preview; Report; Report; Report	Try: Darren Yapp; Danny Riordan; Ray Ofisa; Brendan O'Connor; Con: Mark McHugh; Pen: Mark McHugh (2); Paul Warwick; Drop: Mark McHugh

Hughenden Stadium
Attendance: 1,574
Referee: Hugh Watkins (Wales)

===== Round 9 =====
10 November 2006
19:30

Leinster (Ireland)	38–23	(Scotland) Glasgow Warriors
Try: Denis Hickie; Keith Gleeson; Brian Blaney; Chris Whitaker; Jamie Heaslip; Con: Andrew Dunne; Rob Kearney; Pen: Rob Kearney (3)	Preview; Report; Report; Report	Try: Jon Petrie; Kevin Tkachuk; Thom Evans; Con: Dan Parks; Pen: Dan Parks (2)

Donnybrook
Attendance: 3,750
Referee: James Jones (WRU)

===== Round 10 =====
Glasgow Warriors sat out this round.

===== Round 11 =====
22 December 2006
19:30

Glasgow Warriors (Scotland)	34–27	(Scotland) Edinburgh
Try: Andrew Henderson; Dan Parks; Dan Turner; Con: Dan Parks (2); Pen: Dan Parks (3); Drop: Dan Parks (2)	Preview; Report; Report; Report	Try: Marcus Di Rollo (2); Hugo Southwell; Con: Chris Paterson (3); Pen: Chris Paterson (2)

Hughenden Stadium
Attendance: 2,613
Referee: David Changleng (Gala)

===== Round 12 =====
29 December 2006
19:30

Border Reivers (Scotland)	19–20	(Scotland) Glasgow Warriors
Try: Kelly Brown; Con: Calum MacRae; Pen: Calum MacRae (4)	Preview; Report; Report; Report	Try: Colin Gregor; Hefin O'Hare; Con: Dan Parks (2); Pen: Dan Parks (2)

Netherdale
Attendance: 1,542
Referee: Rob Dixon (SRU)

===== Round 13 =====
6 January 2007
17:30

Glasgow Warriors (Scotland)	8–19	(Ireland) Ulster
Try: Andy Newman; Pen: Dan Parks	Preview; Report; Report; Report	Try: Rory Best; Tommy Bowe; Neil Best; Con: Paddy Wallace

Hughenden Stadium
Attendance: 2,799
Referee: James Jones (WRU)

===== Round 14 =====
26 January 2007
19:30

Glasgow Warriors (Scotland)	22–3	(Wales) Cardiff Blues
Try: Kevin Tkachuk; Fergus Thomson; Sam Pinder; Con: Colin Gregor (2); Pen: Colin Gregor	Preview; Report; Report; Report	Pen: Ben Blair

Hughenden Stadium
Attendance: 1,562
Referee: George Clancy (Ireland)

===== Round 15 =====
16 February 2007
19:30

Glasgow Warriors (Scotland)	30–14	(Wales) Llanelli Scarlets
Try: Kevin Tkachuk; Steve Swindall (2); Hefin O'Hare; Con: Dan Parks (2); Pen: Dan Parks (2)	Preview; Report; Report; Report	Try: Dafydd Jones; Pen: Ceiron Thomas (3)

Hughenden Stadium
Attendance: 1,825
Referee: Peter Fitzgibbon (Ireland)

===== Round 16 =====
2 March 2007
19:30

Newport Gwent Dragons (Wales)	13–3	(Scotland) Glasgow Warriors
Try: Ashley Smith; Con: Ceri Sweeney; Pen: Ceri Sweeney x 2	Preview; Report; Report; Report	Pen: Dan Parks

Rodney Parade
Attendance: 4,656
Referee: George Clancy (Ireland)

===== Round 17 =====
Glasgow Warriors sat out this round.

===== Round 18 =====
6 April 2007
19:30

Glasgow Warriors (Scotland)	26–20	(Ireland) Leinster
Try: Rory Lamont; Thom Evans; Hefin O'Hare; Con: Dan Parks; Pen: Dan Parks x 3	Preview; Report; Report; Report	Try: Gordon D'Arcy x 2 Con: Felipe Contepomi x 2 Pen: Felipe Contepomi x 2

Hughenden Stadium
Attendance: 2,121
Referee: Tim Hayes (Wales)

===== Round 19 =====
13 April 2007
18:30

Connacht (Ireland)	23–40	(Scotland) Glasgow Warriors
Try: Paul Warwick; Conor McPhillips; Penalty try Con: Paul Warwick; Pen: Paul Warwick x 2	Preview; Report; Report; Report	Try: Kevin Tkachuk; John Barclay; Rory Lamont; Hefin O'Hare; Con: Dan Parks x 4 Pen: Dan Parks x 3 Drop: Dan Parks

Sportsground
Attendance: 1,331
Referee: Neil Ballard (Wales)

===== Round 20 =====
27 April 2007
19:30

Ulster (Ireland)	10–24	(Scotland) Glasgow Warriors
Try: Andrew Maxwell; Andrew Trimble	Preview; Report; Report; Report	Try: Johnnie Beattie; John Barclay; Rory Lamont; Con: Dan Parks x 3 Pen: Dan Parks

Ravenhill
Attendance: 8,056
Referee: James Jones (Wales)

===== Round 21 =====
4 May 2007
19:30

Glasgow Warriors (Scotland)	29–26	(Wales) Ospreys
Try: Dan Parks; Graeme Morrison; Con: Dan Parks x 2 Pen: Dan Parks x 5	Preview; Report; Report; Report	Try: Shane Williams x 2 Lee Byrne; Con: James Hook; Pen: Shaun Connor; James Hook x 2

Hughenden Stadium
Attendance: 2,486
Referee: George Clancy (Ireland)

===== Round 22 =====
12 May 2007
17:30

Munster (Ireland)	38–20	(Scotland) Glasgow Warriors
Try: Alan Quinlan x 2 Shaun Payne; Denis Leamy; Lifeimi Mafi; Con: Ronan O'Gara x 4 Jeremy Manning; Pen: Ronan O'Gara	Preview; Report; Report; Report	Try: Graeme Morrison; Johnnie Beattie; Con: Dan Parks; Colin Gregor; Pen: Dan Parks x 2

Musgrave Park
Attendance: 3,311
Referee: Hugh Watkins (Wales)

=== European Challenge Cup ===
==== Table ====
===== Pool 2 =====
Team	P	W	D	L	Tries for	Tries against	Try diff	Points for	Points against	Points diff	TB	LB	Pts
(England) Saracens	6	5	1	0	35	9	26	225	101	124	5	0	26
(Scotland) Glasgow Warriors	6	4	1	1	25	10	15	204	72	132	3	1	22
(France) Narbonne	6	2	0	4	16	20	−4	127	171	−44	1	1	10
(Italy) Parma	6	0	0	6	6	43	−37	84	296	−212	0	1	1

==== Results ====
===== Round 1 =====
22 October 2006
15:00

Saracens (England)	28–23	(Scotland) Glasgow Warriors
Try: Kevin Yates; Penalty try x 2 Con: Glen Jackson x 2 Pen: Glen Jackson x 3	Preview; Report; Report; Report	Try: Francisco Leonelli; Hefin O'Hare; Con: Dan Parks x 2 Pen: Dan Parks x 3

Vicarage Road
Attendance: 4,266
Referee: Tim Hayes (Wales)

===== Round 2 =====
27 October 2006
19:30

Glasgow Warriors (Scotland)	69–7	(Italy) GRAN Parma
Try: Hefin O'Hare x 3 Graeme Morrison; Andrew Henderson; Rory Lamont; Kevin Tkachuk; Steve Swindall; Sam Pinder x 2 Con: Dan Parks x 6 Sam Pinder; Ruaridh Jackson; Pen: Dan Parks	Preview; Report; Report; Report	Try: Jason Tiatia; Con: Rima Wakarua

Hughenden Stadium
Attendance: 1,707
Referee: Rob Debney (England)

===== Round 3 =====
8 December 2006
19:30

Glasgow Warriors (Scotland)	51–7	(France) Narbonne
Try: Rory Lamont; Andrew Henderson; Scott Barrow; Thom Evans; Graeme Beveridge; Kevin Tkachuk; Con: Dan Parks x 5 Colin Gregor; Pen: Dan Parks x 3	Preview; Report; Report; Report	Try: Marthinus van Rensburg; Con: Thomas Bouquié

Hughenden Stadium
Attendance: 1,431
Referee: Carlo Damasco (Italy)

===== Round 4 =====
16 December 2006
19:30

Narbonne (France)	7–8	(Scotland) Glasgow Warriors
Try: Thomas Bouquié; Con: Cédric Rosalen	Preview; Report; Report; Report	Try: Scott Barrow; Pen: Dan Parks

Parc des Sports et de l'Amitié
Attendance: 4,500
Referee: Peter Fitzgibbon (Ireland)

===== Round 5 =====
13 January 2007
14:30

GRAN Parma (Italy)	17–47	(Scotland) Glasgow Warriors
Try: Rima Wakarua; Julio Alcacer McKinley; Con: Rima Wakarua x 2 Pen: Rima Wakarua	Preview; Report; Report; Report	Try: Sean Marsden; Rory Lamont x 2 Thom Evans; Sam Pinder x 2 Con: Dan Parks x 4 Pen: Dan Parks x 3

Stadio Sergio Lanfranchi
Attendance: 700
Referee: Dean Richards (England)

===== Round 6 =====
19 January 2007
19:30

Glasgow Warriors (Scotland)	6–6	(England) Saracens
Pen: Dan Parks x 2	Preview; Report; Report; Report	Pen: Glen Jackson x 2

Hughenden Stadium
Attendance: 2,570
Referee: David Rosich (France)

===== Quarter finals =====
1 April 2007
15:00

Saracens (England)	23–19	(Scotland) Glasgow Warriors
Try: Dan Scarbrough; Kameli Ratuvou; Con: Glen Jackson x 2 Pen: Glen Jackson x 3	Preview; Report; Report; Report	Try: Rory Lamont; Con: Dan Parks; Pen: Dan Parks x 4

Vicarage Road
Attendance: 4,259
Referee: Christophe Berdos (France)

== Competitive debuts this season ==
A player's nationality shown is taken from the nationality at the highest honour for the national side obtained; or if never capped internationally their place of birth. Senior caps take precedence over junior caps or place of birth; junior caps take precedence over place of birth. A player's nationality at debut may be different from the nationality shown. Combination sides like the British and Irish Lions or Pacific Islanders are not national sides, or nationalities.

Players in BOLD font have been capped by their senior international XV side as nationality shown.

Players in Italic font have capped either by their international 7s side; or by the international XV 'A' side as nationality shown.

Players in normal font have not been capped at senior level.

A position in parentheses indicates that the player debuted as a substitute. A player may have made a prior debut for Glasgow Warriors in a non-competitive match, 'A' match or 7s match; these matches are not listed.

Tournaments where competitive debut made:

**Scottish Inter-District Championship**	**Welsh–Scottish League**	**WRU Challenge Cup**	**Celtic League**	**Celtic Cup**	**1872 Cup**	**Pro12**	**Pro14**	**Rainbow Cup**	**United Rugby Championship**	**European Challenge Cup**	**Heineken Cup / European Champions Cup**

Crosshatching indicates a jointly hosted match.

Number	Player nationality	Name	Position	Date of debut	Venue	Stadium	Opposition nationality	Opposition side	Tournament	Match result	Scoring debut
149	(Samoa)	**Justin Va'a**	Prop	2006-09-01	Home	Hughenden Stadium	(Wales)	Dragons	Celtic League	Loss	Nil
150	(Scotland)	**Alastair Kellock**	Lock	2006-09-01	Home	Hughenden Stadium	(Wales)	Dragons	Celtic League	Loss	Nil
151	(Wales)	Andy Newman	Lock	2006-09-01	Home	Hughenden Stadium	(Wales)	Dragons	Celtic League	Loss	Nil
152	(Scotland)	**Thom Evans**	Wing	2006-09-01	Home	Hughenden Stadium	(Wales)	Dragons	Celtic League	Loss	Nil
153	(Argentina)	**Francisco Leonelli**	Full back	2006-09-01	Home	Hughenden Stadium	(Wales)	Dragons	Celtic League	Loss	Nil
154	(England)	Sean Marsden	Centre	2006-09-15	Home	Hughenden Stadium	(Ireland)	Munster	Celtic League	Win	Nil
155	(Scotland)	Calum Forrester	(Flanker)	2006-09-22	Away	Cardiff Arms Park	(Wales)	Cardiff Blues	Celtic League	Win	Nil
156	(Scotland)	**Ruaridh Jackson**	(Fly half)	2006-10-27	Home	Hughenden Stadium	(Italy)	GRAN Parma	European Challenge Cup	Win	2 pts
157	(Scotland)	**Moray Low**	Prop	2006-11-10	Away	Donnybrook Stadium	(Ireland)	Leinster	Celtic League	Loss	Nil

== Sponsorship ==
=== Official kit supplier ===
KooGa
