= St James Park (Exeter) =

Football stadium in Exeter, England

Coordinates: 50°43′51″N 3°31′16″W

- The Park, SJP
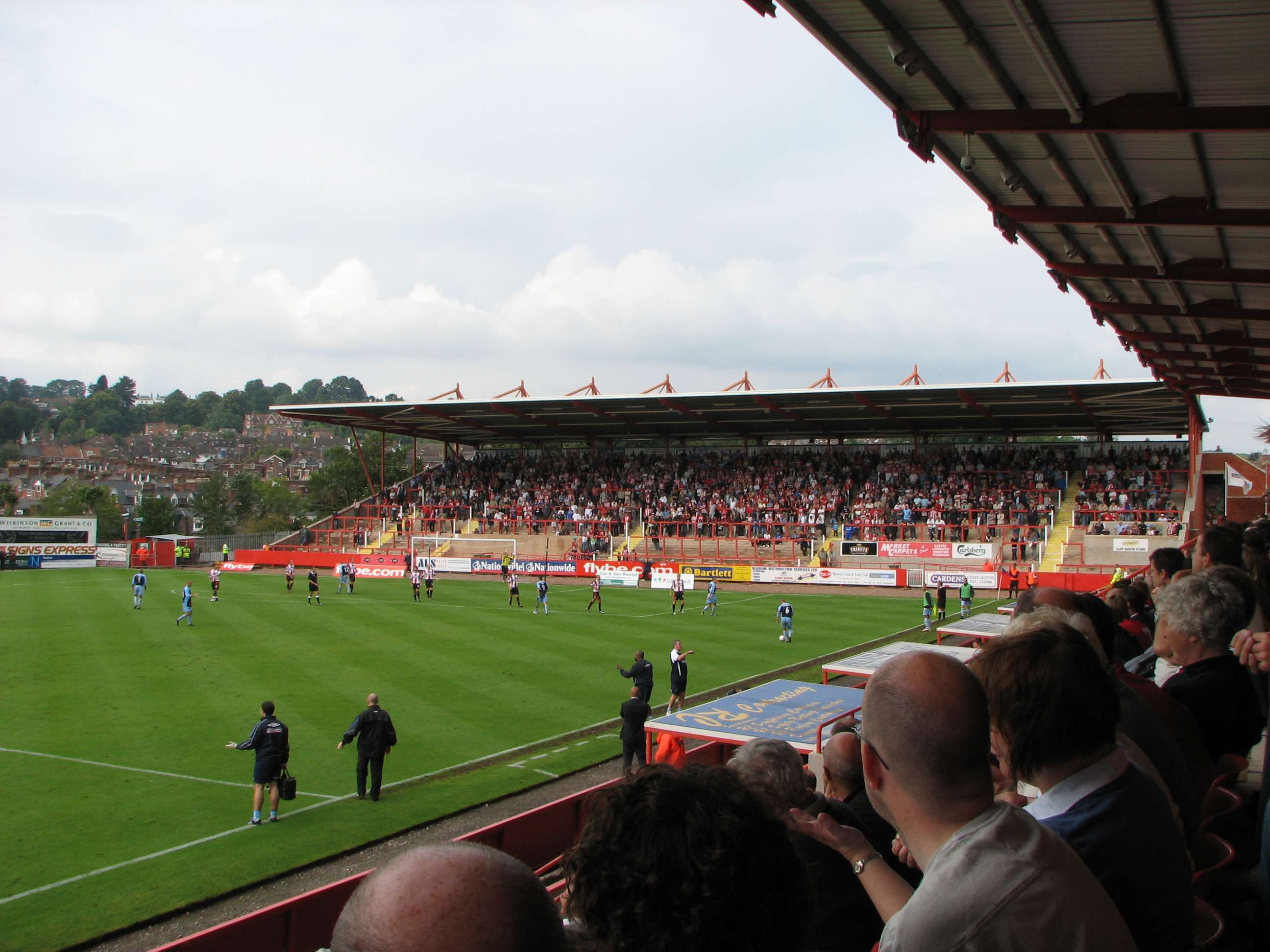
- Interactive map of St James Park
- Full name: St James Park
- Capacity: 8,219
- Surface: Grass
- Record attendance: 20,984; Football (Exeter City FC v. Sunderland A.F.C., 4 March 1931, FA Cup)
- Field size: 104 x 64 metres

Construction
- Built: 1904
- Opened: 10 September 1904

Tenant
- Exeter City Football Club (1904–present)

St James Park is a football stadium in Exeter, Devon, England, and is the home of Exeter City Football Club.

The capacity of St James Park following completion of a £3.4 million redevelopment project is 8,219. The record attendance is 20,984, who watched Exeter lose 4–2 to Sunderland in an FA Cup Sixth Round Replay in 1931.

The stadium is served by the St James Park railway station, which is right next to the ground (the line runs behind the grandstand).

== Stands ==
The Stagecoach Stand and the away terrace were closed for the 2017–18 season to allow redevelopment work at the stadium, with away fans only allocated around 200–300 tickets in the main seated stand during that time. This temporarily reduced the stadium capacity to around 6,000.

In 2020, due to the COVID-19 pandemic, the televised second leg of the 2019–20 League Two play-off semi-final between Exeter City and Colchester United was played at St James Park without spectators. Paying £25 each, Exeter City supporters provided 1,256 personal photographic portraits to a company called FaceInTheCrowd, and the company manufactured life size polypropylene "cutouts" which were placed in the Stagecoach stand for the match, and then transported to Wembley Stadium after Exeter won through to the play-off final. The supporters' payment for the cutouts, less production costs, was donated to the club. The supporters who wished to were able to reclaim their cutouts after the play-offs.

The current certified capacity of the stadium is 8,720 but, in order to comply with updated safety guidance, the operational capacity at St James Park is 8,219.

Stand	Other names	For	Capacity
Thatchers Big Bank	Big Bank / Cliff Bastin Stand	Home Fans	3,960 (standing)
Nevada Construction Stand	Main Stand/Cowshed/Doble Stand	Home Fans & Away Fans	2,116 (seated) 200-300 (away seating allocation)
Optimising IT Adam Stansfield Stand	New Old Grandstand	Home Fans	1,599 (seated)
Tracks Suzuki Away Stand	Away End / St James Road End	Away Fans	1,045 (standing)

== History ==
In 1654 the land was owned by Lady Anne Clifford who rented it out for fattening pigs. The proceeds went to a charity set up to pay for the apprenticeship of a poor child from the parish of St Stephen, an arrangement that was supposed to be renewed "yearly to the world's end." Pigs were resident for nearly 250 years and in later times, were joined by other tenants of low repute. Prior to 1904, Exeter United FC played its games here and after merging with St. Sidwell's United, the ground was leased to the newly formed Exeter City FC with the new contract stipulating that "no menageries, shows, circuses or steam roundabouts" were to be allowed on the premises.

In the ground's early days, some visiting clubs complained about the ground claiming it wasn't regulation length, and both Stoke (in 1909) and Reading (1910) refused to play FA Cup games at the ground, although the matter was resolved in 1920 when the club purchased the land east of the ground and were able to extend the pitch and construct the Big Bank stand.

In 1921 the club was able to buy the site, thanks to money raised through the record breaking sale of Dick Pym to Bolton, and proceeded to develop the ground, adding a roof to the Cowshed stand and in 1926 rebuilding the Grandstand destroyed by fire the previous year.

=== Modern development ===
In 1994 the club encountered financial difficulties and the ground was sold to Beazer Homes, and was later purchased by Exeter City Council who leased it back to the club. Finances had improved by 1996 and the club began to redevelop St James Park, rebuilding the Big Bank stand (2000) and replacing the Cowshed terrace with an all-seater stand (2001). The neighbouring former St. James' School building, now known as The Park, was refurbished into new offices, a social club and corporate hospitality /conference and banqueting facilities.

Financial difficulties, including debt to stadium redevelopers Mowlem, caused the redevelopment plans to be put on hold but matters continued to decline, culminating in the club's most traumatic episode at the end of the 2002/03 season, when police raided the club and removed the recently instated chairman, his wife and the vice-chairman for questioning. Later that year the Supporters Trust took over day-to-day running of the club, and to overcome the financial problems entered into a CVA.

In 2005, thanks largely to the money generated from the FA Cup third round match at Old Trafford the previous year, the club came out of administration and the Supporters Trust began again to look at the redevelopment of the ground. In the meantime, much of the small scale maintenance and repair work has been undertaken by a volunteer workforce of fans organised by the Trust, using resources donated by local businesses.

In 2004, talks were held with the Exeter Chiefs rugby club, who were in with a good chance of obtaining promotion to the Zurich Premiership that season. Because the Chiefs 100-year-old County Ground didn't meet Premiership requirements and their new Sandy Park Stadium was not due to open for another season, the clubs were looking at a possible one year groundshare at St James Park. There were also talks of a future groundshare at the Sandy Park stadium should Exeter City decide to leave St James Park. In the end, the Chiefs missed promotion by 4 points to Bristol and were able to stay at the County Ground for the next season. Contractual restrictions on the use of Sandy Park halted talk of a future groundshare there too.

In May 2016, permission was granted for a redevelopment of the Old Grandstand (then known as the Stagecoach Family Stand), that would see the 90-year-old stand be demolished and replaced with a new 1,600 seat stand, which would be financed by the building of new student accommodation behind the Big Bank. The option for a new, covered standing away terrace was also included and approved under planning permission. As part of the redevelopment, the club announced in October 2018 that the Old Grandstand's replacement would be named 'The Stagecoach Adam Stansfield Stand', in honour of the striker who died from cancer in 2010, at the age of 31.

== International matches ==
St James Park hosted an international fixture on 22 November 2006, when England Women's Under 21s took on France in a friendly match. The game finished 1–1.

The Park also hosted the England C international match against Wales on 20 February 2008, which England won 2–1.
