= SCAA Causeway Bay RFC =

SCAA Causeway Bay Rugby Football Club
- Founded: 1988
- Union: Hong Kong Rugby Union
- Location: So Kon Po Recreation Ground, Causeway Bay, Hong Kong Island
- Club Chair: (Hong Kong) Martini Ip, (India) Umesh Desai
- Director of Rugby: (New Zealand) Matthew McManaway
- Mens Leagues: Men - HKCR Men's Championship League 2 (Marines), HKCR Men's Community League 2 (Contenders)
- Women Leagues: AIRSIDE Women's Premiership, HKCR Women's Championship, HKCR Community 12's League
- Affiliate: South China Athletic Association
- Sponsors: Ruggers, Carnegie's, THE BEANS (North Point), Hirudoid, Body Solution, Movewell, Pillar Sports, Pedestrian coffee, Rudy's Kombucha, Streamline Sports
- http://www.scaacwbrugby.com/ Men’s Team Instagram: https://www.instagram.com/scaacwbrugby/[1] Women’s Team Instagram: https://www.instagram.com/scaacwbphoenixacr/ [2] Youth & Mini Section Instagram: https://www.instagram.com/scaacwbcubs/ [3]

SCAA Causeway Bay Rugby Football Club is a rugby union and sports club based in Causeway Bay, Hong Kong.

Club teams also compete in other sports including league-topping Junior Netball, the United Mavericks Women's Lacrosse and Mini Lacrosse.

== Trophies and History ==
The men section has won the League and Grand Championship in 2013/2014 and 2014/2015.

Participation in French TV reality program Les Anges de la telerealite in December 2019, shooting during a game against Typhoons and a one way win for Causeway Bay RFC after multiple devastating scrums.

The men section has won the HKCR Men's Championship League 3 Champion in 2024/2025 and promoted to Championship League 2

== History ==
SCAA Causeway Bay Rugby Football Club through its association with the South China Athletics Association (also known as South China, SCAA), also known simply as Causeway Bay and more familiarly as CWB, is a Rugby Union club based in Causeway Bay, Hong Kong. The Club was founded in 1988 by a group of friends, most of whom were Chinese graduates that had returned from studies abroad.

So Kon Po has been the home of Causeway Bay over the last few seasons, although prior to that the Club was based at Causeway Park, located directly next to the Central Library in Hong Kong. Causeway Bay's crest features a black and white monogram design incorporating the intertwined initials of the Club, and was designed by Rambo Leung, a stalwart of the Club. The Club's first official colours were sky blue and white, although the founders quickly changed them to the notorious maroon and black, which have been used for the majority of the Club's 25-year history. Following the establishment of the alliance with the SCAA, the Club briefly adopted South China's iconic tricolore red, white and blue colourway before finally settling with its pink colours in the 2012/2013 playing season. Apart from making its players stand out, the pink colourway was primarily adopted to avoid kit clashes with other local Rugby clubs.

== Club Crest ==
1988 to 1994 The first incarnation of the Club’s crest featuring the ‘ferocious ram’ – at the time of the Club’s establishment, it was only able to field one team, hence the Club as a whole was referred to as the “Causeway Bay Rams”. As the Club expanded, a second team was formed, the “Pirates”, and the name of the “Rams” was assigned to its First XV.

1994 to 1999 The second incarnation of the Club’s crest designed by Rambo Leung, inspired by the classic 'Baa-Baa's' style monogram crest and incorporating the intertwined initials of the Club.

1999 to 2009 This version of the Club’s crest has been used for a significant period in the Club’s history, staying true to Rambo's original artwork while incorporating minor modifications, including the use of a thicker outline for the initials and the solid letter "C" to add contrast to the overall crest.

While this image shows the crest with the words “Causeway Bay R.F.C.” underneath, during this period the Club's jerseys were usually adorned with just the monogram embroidered on the left chest.

2010 - 2012 This version of the Club’s crest was developed by local graphic designer, Midori Lai.

As part of the assignment, Midori revamped the Club’s crest, using more prominent and cleaner lines to define the letters forming the initials of the Club. She also gave the crest a unique twist by adding a heraldic banner with the Club’s name, as well as place and year of establishment.

2012/2013 Silver Jubilee Season onwards The latest incarnation of the iconic CWB crest was developed by one of the Club’s Director, Mark Loynd, together with Irish graphic designer Ray Hurley, as part of the Club’s 25th Anniversary celebrations.

Inspired by the revamped England and Japan national team motifs, the new CWB crest adopts a black and white colour scheme, with a new white 'shield', giving it a military outlook.

== SCAA CWB Management Committee ==
- (Hong Kong) Martini Ip - Club Chair
- (Hong Kong) Jimson Lam - Deputy Club Chair
- (Hong Kong) Nicole Cheung - Finance Manager
- (New Zealand) Martin Robinson - Secretary
- (Hong Kong) James Kong - Sponsorship Manager
- (Hong Kong) Choco Chan - Women’s Rugby Representative
- (Hong Kong) Keith Lo - Men’s Rugby Representative
- (Hong Kong) Hugo Chiu - Youth & Minis Rugby Representative
- (Hong Kong) Ella Tsang - Membership & Sevens Tickets Manager
- (Hong Kong) Dora Wu - Social Events Manager
- (Hong Kong) Arthur Ying - Kit Manager
- (Hong Kong) Alan Cheung - Communications Manager (Social Media)
- (Hong Kong) Jimson Lam - SCAA Liaison

== Past Notable Male Players ==
- (Scotland) Sam Pinder - Scottish international, former Glasgow Warriors player
- Jung Ho Jung - Hong Kong international
- Rambo Leung - Hong Kong international
- Mark Loynd - Hong Kong international
- Kelvin Yip - Hong Kong international
- Pierre Antoine "PAM" Montfort - France international
- Thibaut "Poussin" Jullien - France international
- Valentin Barrie - France international
- Matthew McManaway - New Zealand international
- (Scotland) Angus Maclean - Scottish international
- (Scotland) Martin Rainey - Scottish international
- Antoine Nourisson - France international

== Past Notable Female Players ==
- Chan, Ho Ting Hoty - Hong Kong international
- Lau, Sin Tung Kim - Hong Kong international
- Wong, Jin Ting Henrietta - Hong Kong international
