= Ben Addison =

Scottish rugby player (born 1985)

- Born: Ben Addison; 8 January 1985 (age 41) Scotland
- Height: 1.83 m (6 ft 0 in)
- Weight: 87 kg (13 st 10 lb)
- University: Glasgow Caledonian University

Rugby union career
- Position: Fullback / Wing
Amateur team(s)
Years	Team	Apps	(Points)
-	Stirling County	-	(-)
2015-2019	GHA RFC	84	(185)
Senior career
Years	Team	Apps	(Points)
2005-2007	Glasgow Warriors		
International career
Years	Team	Apps	(Points)
-	Scotland U19	-	
-	Scotland U21	-	
National sevens team
Years	Team		Comps
2006-2008	Scotland		12
Coaching career
- Years: Team
- 2014-2015: Stirling County (Asst.)
- 2015-2019: Glasgow Hutchesons Aloysians (Player-Coach)

Ben Addison (born 8 January 1985, in Scotland) is a former Scotland Sevens international rugby union player and now coach who played fullback and on the wing for Glasgow Warriors.

At university Addison was studying to be a physiotherapist.

== Amateur career ==
Addison came through the age grades at amateur provincial level playing with Caledonia at U16, U18 and U19

He played for Stirling County. He played in the British & Irish Cup for County.

He then moved to Glasgow Hutchesons Aloysians in 2015.

== Professional career ==
Addison played for Glasgow Warriors in 2005-06 season.

He started the match against Ayr.

He also started on the bench in the Warriors match against Edinburgh Rugby that same season.

He broke into Glasgow's academy squad for season 2006-07. He played in the Warriors match against the Scotland U20 side.

== International career ==
Addison came through the age grades for Scotland. He played for Scotland U19 and at Scotland U21

He was then capped by Scotland Sevens. He was selected for all eight legs of the 2006-2007 World Series and after recovering from injury was selected for the final four legs of the 2007-2008 Series.

== Coaching career ==
In 2014 he became an assistant coach at Stirling County.

In 2015 he joined Glasgow Hutchesons Aloysians as a player-coach.

In 2016 he was made a backs coach at Glasgow Hutchesons Aloysians.

In 2021 he became attack coach of Hamilton RFC.

In 2023 he became head coach of Hamilton RFC.
