= Chris Cusiter =

British Lions & Scotland international rugby union player

- Born: Christopher Peter Cusiter; 13 June 1982 (age 44) Aberdeen, Scotland
- Height: 1.78 m (5 ft 10 in)
- Weight: 85 kg (13 st 5 lb)
- School: Robert Gordon's College
- University: University of Edinburgh
- Notable relative(s): Calum Cusiter, brother

Rugby union career
- Position: Scrum-half
Amateur team(s)
Years	Team	Apps	(Points)
- Watsonians RFC
2003	Boroughmuir RFC		
Senior career
Years	Team	Apps	(Points)
2001–2002	Glasgow Warriors	1	(0)
2003–2007	Border Reivers	25	(10)
2007–2009	Perpignan	39	(15)
2009–2014	Glasgow Warriors	58	(15)
2011	Southern Districts	3	(0)
2014–2016	Sale Sharks	24	(20)
International career
Years	Team	Apps	(Points)
2004–2014	Scotland	70	(15)
2005	British & Irish Lions	1	(0)

4th Sir Willie Purves Quaich
- In office 2003–2003
- Preceded by: Ally Hogg
- Succeeded by: Mark McMillan

Christopher Peter Cusiter (born 13 June 1982) is a retired Scottish international rugby union player who played at scrum-half. He played for teams including Glasgow Warriors, Border Reivers and Perpignan before ending his career at Sale Sharks.

== International career ==
Cusiter made his first start for Scotland in the 2004 Six Nations match against Wales.

During 2005 and 2006 Cusiter suffered a series of injuries representing Scotland. In 2015 he sustained a knee injury against Australia and upon his starting return against Italy in the 2006 Six Nations suffered a pectoral injury. After making a substitute appearance against Romania in the 2006 Autumn tests he was given the all clear to start against the Pacific Islanders only to be stretchered off after 10 minutes.

Cusiter was named as joint-captain Captain along with Mike Blair for the Autumn internationals of 2009 and the 2010 Six Nations Championship.

Cusiter went on the 2005 British & Irish Lions tour to New Zealand making one appearance as a substitute against Argentina.

== Club career ==
While still at Watsonians, Cusiter was called into the Glasgow Warriors side in the 2001–02 season. At the end of the season he had a number of games warming the bench, before making his professional debut coming on in the 79th minute against Swansea RFC in the Welsh-Scottish League in Glasgow's last game of the season.

At the season end he moved back to Watsonians, but secured another professional club in 2003 when he signed for Border Reivers. The Borders side folded in 2007 and Cusiter moved to play in France. On 18 April 2007, it was announced that Cusiter would sign for the French side Perpignan.

On 27 January 2009 Cusiter moved back to Scotland, securing a deal to play with Glasgow Warriors once again; this time on a three-year contract. His contract was extended and he played with Glasgow till the end of the 2013–14 season.

For the following season 2014–15, he moved to the English Aviva Premiership side, Sale Sharks.

Cusiter announced his retirement from rugby in May 2016.

== Personal ==
His brother Calum was also an international Rugby player representing the Scotland 7s team.

Cusiter is a self-confessed fan of rugby league, following the Catalans Dragons after his two-year spell in Perpignan.

Originally from Aberdeen, he attended Robert Gordon's College and studied law at the University of Edinburgh.

Following his retirement moved to California to set up a whisky-focused alcohol retail business.
