= Tony Nyangweso =

- Born: Tony Nyangweso Uganda
- School: Buganda Road Primary School; Namilyango College
- University: University of the West of Scotland

Rugby union career
- Position: Centre / Wing
Amateur team(s)
Years	Team	Apps	(Points)
1998-2001	Dmark Kobs		
2001-	Cartha Queens Park		
Senior career
Years	Team	Apps	(Points)
2006-07	Glasgow Warriors	2	(5)
International career
Years	Team	Apps	(Points)
1999-	Uganda	28	(75)
National sevens team
Years	Team		Comps
2001-	Uganda 7s		12

Tony Nyangweso is a Uganda international rugby union player. He plays at centre and wing.

== Rugby Union career ==
=== Amateur career ===
Nyangweso started playing rugby while at his secondary school, Namilyango College.

From there he joined Kobs Rugby Club in Uganda. Sponsored by mobile phone company Dmark, the side is now known as Dmark Kobs.

Nyangweso plays for Cartha Queens Park in Glasgow.

=== Professional career ===
Nyangweso played for Glasgow Warriors in the 2006-07 season. He played in the friendly match against Border Reivers. He scored a try in the match.

=== International career ===
Nyangweso was capped for Uganda in 2001.

He was also capped for the Uganda 7s.
