= 2004–05 National Division One =

Rugby union competition in England

- Countries: England
- Champions: Bristol Shoguns
- Runners-up: Exeter
- Relegated: Orrell and Henley
- Attendance: 266,588 (average 1,687 per match) (Note: Note that 24 home attendances are missing (see below) - so the total attendance will not be 100% accurate. The average attendance has also been taken into account with the missing games not included.)
- Highest attendance: 10,349 Bristol Shoguns at home to Exeter Chiefs on 27 March 2005
- Lowest attendance: 237 Orrell at home to Plymouth Albion on 12 March 2005
- Top point scorer: (England) Leigh Hinton (Bedford Blues) 347 points
- Top try scorer: (England) Sean Marsden (Bristol Shoguns) 21 tries

The 2004–05 National Division One was the 18th full season of rugby union within the second tier of the English league system, currently known as the RFU Championship. New teams to the division included Rotherham Titans who were demoted from the 2003–04 Zurich Premiership while Sedgley Park and Nottingham were promoted from the 2003–04 National Division Two. Rotherham almost went into liquidation and dropped out of the leagues following their relegation from the Premiership but were saved by a local consortium which enabled them to continue playing in National One. As well as new teams Coventry had a new ground, moving from Coundon Road to the smaller but more modern Butts Park Arena.

By the end of the season, after two seasons spent in the division, Bristol Shoguns became champions and were promoted back to the Guinness Premiership for season 2005–06. Exeter Chiefs were runners–up, and Orrell (last seasons runners–up) along with Henley were relegated to the 2005–06 National Division Two.

== Participating teams ==
Locations of the 2004–05 National Division One teams

Team	Stadium	Capacity	City/Area
Bedford Blues	Goldington Road	5,000	Bedford, Bedfordshire
Bristol Shoguns	Memorial Stadium	8,500 (1,200 seats)	Bristol
Coventry	Butts Park Arena	4,000	Coventry, West Midlands
Exeter Chiefs	County Ground	5,750 (750 seats)	Exeter, Devon
Henley Hawks	Dry Leas	4,000	Henley-on-Thames, Oxfordshire
London Welsh	Old Deer Park	4,500 (1,500 seats)	Richmond, London
Nottingham	Ireland Avenue	4,990 (590 seats)	Beeston, Nottinghamshire
Orrell	Edge Hall Road	5,300 (300 seats)	Orrell, Greater Manchester
Otley	Cross Green	7,000 (852 seats)	Otley, West Yorkshire
Penzance & Newlyn	Mennaye Field	3,500+	Penzance, Cornwall
Pertemps Bees	Sharmans Cross	4,000	Solihull, West Midlands
Plymouth Albion	The Brickfields	6,500	Plymouth, Devon
Rotherham Titans	Clifton Lane	2,500	Rotherham, South Yorkshire
Sedgley Park	Park Lane	3,000	Whitefield, Greater Manchester

== Table ==
2004–05 National Division One table
Pos	Team	Pld	W	D	L	PF	PA	PD	TB	LB	Pts	Qualification
1	Bristol Shoguns	26	22	0	4	940	355	+585	15	2	105	Promoted
2	Exeter Chiefs	26	20	0	6	805	511	+294	17	4	101	
3	Plymouth Albion	26	19	2	5	653	494	+159	12	2	94	
4	Penzance and Newlyn	26	17	0	9	698	526	+172	12	5	85	
5	Otley	26	17	1	8	572	436	+136	7	3	80	
6	Coventry	26	16	1	9	666	565	+101	10	2	78	
7	Bedford Blues	26	16	1	9	679	536	+143	8	2	76	
8	Rotherham Titans	26	12	0	14	598	543	+55	8	7	63	
9	Pertemps Bees	26	10	0	16	541	667	−126	7	2	49	
10	Sedgley Park	26	8	0	18	515	772	−257	4	4	40	
11	Nottingham	26	7	0	19	525	752	−227	8	4	40	
12	London Welsh	26	7	0	19	494	754	−260	4	5	37	
13	Henley Hawks	26	6	0	20	483	811	−328	4	4	32	Relegated
14	Orrell	26	2	1	23	439	886	−447	1	4	15	Relegated

Rules for classification: Points are awarded as follows: four points for a win; two points for a draw; no points for a loss; one bonus point for scoring four tries or more in a match; one bonus point for losing by seven points or less.
- If teams are level at any stage, tiebreakers are applied in the following order: (1) difference between points for and against; (2) total number of points for.

== Results ==
=== Round 1 ===
4 September 2004

Coventry	40 - 10	Nottingham
	Report

Butts Park Arena
Attendance: 2,700
Referee: Tim Beddow

4 September 2004

Exeter Chiefs	38 - 26	London Welsh
	Report

County Ground
Attendance: 1,500
Referee: Bruce Robertson

4 September 2004

Henley Hawks	25 - 45	Pertemps Bees
	Report

Dry Leas
Attendance: 410
Referee: Nigel Higginson

4 September 2004

Otley	37 - 28	Orrell
	Report

Cross Green
Attendance: 620
Referee: Andrew Small

4 September 2004

Sedgley Park	21 - 32	Plymouth Albion
	Report

Park Lane
Attendance: 640
Referee: David Rose

4 September 2004

Bedford Blues	P - P	Rotherham Titans

- Postponed. Game rescheduled to 12 February 2005.

5 September 2004

Penzance & Newlyn	20 - 28	Bristol Shoguns
	Report

Mennaye Field
Attendance: 2,750
Referee: Gareth Copsey

=== Round 2 ===
11 September 2004

Bedford Blues	49 - 12	Henley Hawks
	Report

Goldington Road
Attendance: 1,632
Referee: Nick Williams

11 September 2004

Nottingham	25 - 38	Otley
	Report

Ireland Avenue
Attendance: 580
Referee: Mark Wilson

11 September 2004

Orrell	13 - 20	Coventry
	Report

Edge Hall Road
Attendance: 396
Referee: Llyr Apgeraint-Roberts

11 September 2004

Pertemps Bees	33 - 12	Penzance & Newlyn
	Report

Sharmans Cross
Attendance: 500
Referee: Bruce Robertson

11 September 2004

Plymouth Albion	17 - 16	Exeter Chiefs
	Report

Brickfields
Attendance: 5,124
Referee: Sean Davey

11 September 2004

Rotherham Titans	42 - 22	Sedgley Park
	Report

Clifton Lane
Attendance: 1,250
Referee: Andrew Small

12 September 2004

Bristol Shoguns	25 - 12	London Welsh
	Report

Memorial Stadium
Attendance: 4,274
Referee: Tim Beddow

=== Round 3 ===
18 September 2004

Henley Hawks	14 - 34	Exeter Chiefs
	Report

Dry Leas
Attendance: 746
Referee: Andrew Small

18 September 2004

London Welsh	13 - 49	Pertemps Bees
	Report

Old Deer Park
Attendance: 810
Referee: S Leyshon

18 September 2004

Otley	6 - 34	Bedford Blues
	Report

Cross Green
Attendance: 811
Referee: Rob Debney

18 September 2004

Plymouth Albion	41 - 23	Nottingham
	Report

Brickfields
Attendance: 2,567
Referee: Geraint Ashton-Jones

18 September 2004

Rotherham Titans	62 - 19	Orrell
	Report

Clifton Lane
Attendance: 1,250
Referee: Robin Goodliffe

18 September 2004

Sedgley Park	20 - 43	Bristol Shoguns
	Report

Park Lane
Attendance: 620
Referee: Mark Wilson

19 September 2004

Penzance & Newlyn	29 - 14	Coventry
	Report

Mennaye Field
Attendance: 1,500
Referee: Alan Biggs

=== Round 4 ===
25 September 2004

Coventry	31 - 24	Henley Hawks
	Report

Butts Park Arena
Attendance: 2,100
Referee: Tim Wigglesworth

25 September 2004

Exeter Chiefs	42 - 21	Bedford Blues
	Report

County Ground
Attendance: 1,321
Referee: Martin Fox

25 September 2004

London Welsh	12 - 29	Rotherham Titans
	Report

Old Deer Park
Attendance: 860
Referee: Geraint Ashton-Jones

25 September 2004

Nottingham	21 - 42	Penzance & Newlyn
	Report

Ireland Avenue
Attendance: 650
Referee: Nigel Higginson

25 September 2004

Sedgley Park	8 - 28	Otley
	Report

Park Lane
Attendance: 480
Referee: Gareth Copsey

26 September 2004

Bristol Shoguns	7 - 12	Plymouth Albion
	Report

Memorial Stadium
Attendance: 5,059
Referee: David Rose

26 September 2004

Orrell	30 - 34	Pertemps Bees
	Report

Edge Hall Road
Attendance: 342
Referee: Chris Sharp

=== Round 5 ===
2 October 2004

Bedford Blues	14 - 14	Orrell
	Report

Goldington Road
Attendance: 1,901
Referee: Bruce Robertson

2 October 2004

Coventry	27 - 21	London Welsh
	Report

Butts Park Arena
Attendance: 1,750
Referee: Geraint Ashton-Jones

2 October 2004

Henley Hawks	41 - 19	Sedgley Park
	Report

Dry Leas
Attendance: 581

2 October 2004

Nottingham	28 - 66	Bristol Shoguns
	Report

Ireland Avenue
Attendance: 750
Referee: Andrew Small

2 October 2004

Pertemps Bees	32 - 19	Otley
	Report

Sharmans Cross
Attendance: 450
Referee: Nigel Higginson

3 October 2004

Penzance & Newyln	15 - 9	Exeter Chiefs
	Report

Mennaye Field
Attendance: 1,850
Referee: Tim Beddow

2 October 2004

Rotherham Titans	24 - 18	Plymouth Albion
	Report

Clifton Lane
Referee: Robin Goodliffe

=== Round 6 ===
9 October 2004

Exeter Chiefs	41 - 5	Orrell
	Report

County Ground
Attendance: 1,032
Referee: Llyr Apgeraint-Roberts

9 October 2004

London Welsh	24 - 46	Bedford Blues
	Report

Old Deer Park
Attendance: 1,330
Referee: Sean Davey

9 October 2004

Otley	15-9	Henley Hawks
	Report

Cross Green
Attendance: 750
Referee: Alan Biggs

9 October 2004

Plymouth Albion	46 - 8	Coventry
	Report

Brickfields
Attendance: 2,362
Referee: Andrew Small

9 October 2004

Rotherham Titans	35 - 26	Nottingham
	Report

Clifton Lane
Attendance: 1,500
Referee: Gareth Copsey

9 October 2004

Sedgley Park	28 - 7	Penzance & Newlyn
	Report

Park Lane
Attendance: 320
Referee: Jean Luc Rebollal

10 October 2004

Bristol Shoguns	31 - 14	Pertemps Bees
	Report

Memorial Stadium
Attendance: 5,234
Referee: Neil Ballard

=== Round 7 ===
23 October 2004

Bedford Blues	13 - 8	Sedgley Park
	Report

Goldington Road
Attendance: 1,507
Referee: Chris Sharp

23 October 2004

Coventry	See note below	Rotherham Titans
	Report

Butts Park Arena

- Despite earlier winning the game 22-15 Coventry were in breach of RFU principal regulation 11.4 and the Titans were awarded the win.

23 October 2004

Henley Hawks	6 - 41	Bristol Shoguns
	Report

Dry Leas
Attendance: 787
Referee: Nick Williams

23 October 2004

Nottingham	17 - 24	Exeter Chiefs
	Report

Ireland Avenue
Attendance: 580
Referee: Mark Wilson

23 October 2004

Orrell	22 - 29	London Welsh
	Report

Edge Hall Road
Attendance: 650
Referee: Dean Richards

23 October 2004

Otley	24 - 13	Penzance & Newlyn
	Report

Cross Green
Referee: Llyr Apgeraint-Roberts

23 October 2004

Pertemps Bees	16 - 5	Plymouth Albion
	Report

Sharmans Cross
Referee: Tim Wigglesworth

=== Round 8 ===
30 October 2004

Exeter Chiefs	P - P	Otley

- Postponed. Game rescheduled to 5 March 2005.

30 October 2004

London Welsh	17 - 21	Sedgley Park
	Report

Old Deer Park
Attendance: 950
Referee: Mark Wilson

30 October 2004

Nottingham	42 - 17	Henley Hawks
	Report

Ireland Avenue
Attendance: 720
Referee: Alan Biggs

30 October 2004

Plymouth Albion	20 - 5	Orrell
	Report

Brickfields
Attendance: 2,830
Referee: Bruce Robertson

30 October 2004

Rotherham Titans	30 - 12	Pertemps Bees
	Report

Clifton Lane
Attendance: 1,750
Referee: S Leyshon

31 October 2004

Bristol Shoguns	53 - 10	Coventry
	Report

Memorial Stadium
Attendance: 5,049
Referee: Geraint Ashton-Jones

31 October 2004

Penzance & Newlyn	30 - 19	Bedford Blues
	Report

Mennaye Field
Attendance: 1,485
Referee: Tim Beddow

=== Round 9 ===
13 November 2004

Coventry	27 - 26	Otley
	Report

Butts Park Arena
Attendance: 950
Referee: Llyr Apgeraint-Roberts

13 November 2004

London Welsh	15 - 32	Penzance & Newlyn
	Report

Old Deer Park
Attendance: 1,300
Referee: Rob Debney

13 November 2004

Orrell	26 - 25	Henley Hawks
	Report

Edge Hall Road
Attendance: 317

13 November 2004

Pertemps Bees	13 - 20	Nottingham
	Report

Sharmans Cross
Referee: Gareth Copsey

13 November 2004

Plymouth Albion	19 - 9	Bedford Blues
	Report

Brickfields
Attendance: 2,810
Referee: Tim Wigglesworth

13 November 2004

Rotherham Titans	15 - 16	Bristol Shoguns
	Report

Clifton Lane
Attendance: 2,000
Referee: Tim Beddow

13 November 2004

Sedgley Park	25 - 39	Exeter Chiefs
	Report

Park Lane
Attendance: 480
Referee: Robin Goodliffe

=== Round 10 ===
20 November 2004

Bedford Blues	41 - 8	Pertemps Bees
	Report

Goldington Road
Attendance: 1,224
Referee: Dean Richards

20 November 2004

Exeter Chiefs	40 - 3	Coventry
	Report

County Ground
Attendance: 1,153
Referee: Alan Biggs

20 November 2004

Henley Hawks	7 - 18	Plymouth Albion
	Report

Dry Leas
Referee: Mark Wilson

20 November 2004

Nottingham	41 - 22	Sedgley Park
	Report

Ireland Avenue
Attendance: 560
Referee: Chris Sharp

20 November 2004

Otley	24 - 3	London Welsh
	Report

Cross Green
Attendance: 650
Referee: Bruce Robertson

21 November 2004

Bristol Shoguns	52 - 15	Orrell
	Report

Memorial Stadium
Attendance: 4,415
Referee: Gareth Copsey

21 November 2004

Penzance & Newlyn	24 - 3	Rotherham Titans
	Report

Mennaye Field
Attendance: 1,784
Referee: Nick Williams

=== Round 11 ===
4 December 2004

Coventry	18 - 19	Sedgley Park
	Report

Park Lane
Referee: Tim Wigglesworth

4 December 2004

London Welsh	34 - 30	Nottingham
	Report

Old Deer Park
Attendance: 450
Referee: Nigel Higginson

4 December 2004

Orrell	13 - 31	Penzance & Newlyn
	Report

Edge Hall Road
Attendance: 320
Referee: Bruce Robertson

4 December 2004

Pertemps Bees	17 - 39	Exeter Chiefs
	Report

Sharmans Cross
Attendance: 500
Referee: Tim Beddow

4 December 2004

Plymouth Albion	11 - 11	Otley
	Report

Brickfields
Attendance: 1,949
Referee: Gareth Copsey

4 December 2004

Rotherham Titans	27 - 7	Henley Hawks
	Report

Clifton Lane
Attendance: 1,000
Referee: Chris Sharp

5 December 2004

Bristol Shoguns	37 - 6	Bedford Blues
	Report

Memorial Stadium
Attendance: 4,532
Referee: Mark Wilson

=== Round 12 ===
11 December 2004

Bedford Blues	26 - 16	Coventry
	Report

Goldington Road
Attendance: 1,753
Referee: David Rosich

11 December 2004

Exeter Chiefs	41 - 17	Rotherham Titans
	Report

County Ground
Attendance: 1,178
Referee: Bruce Robertson

11 December 2004

London Welsh	34 - 40	Plymouth Albion
	Report

Old Deer Park
Attendance: 1,200
Referee: Nick Williams

11 December 2004

Nottingham	31 - 9	Orrell
	Report

Ireland Avenue
Attendance: 810
Referee: Llyr Apgeraint-Roberts

11 December 2004

Sedgley Park	38 - 19	Pertemps Bees
	Report

Park Lane
Attendance: 420
Referee: S Leyshon

12 December 2004

Bristol Shoguns	23 - 11	Otley
	Report

Memorial Stadium
Attendance: 4,182
Referee: Tim Wigglesworth

12 December 2004

Penzance & Newlyn	33 - 13	Henley Hawks
	Report

Mennaye Field
Attendance: 1,840
Referee: Alan Biggs

=== Round 13 ===
27 December 2004

Bedford Blues	33 - 13	Nottingham
	Report

Goldington Road
Attendance: 3,949
Referee: S Leyshon

27 December 2004

Coventry	P - P	Pertemps Bees

- Postponed. Game rescheduled to 5 February 2005.

27 December 2004

Exeter Chiefs	P - P	Bristol Shoguns

- Postponed. Game rescheduled to 5 February 2005.

27 December 2004

Otley	24 - 12	Rotherham Titans
	Report

Cross Green
Referee: Tim Wigglesworth

27 December 2004

Penzance & Newlyn	21 - 26	Plymouth Albion
	Report

Mennaye Field
Attendance: 5,000
Referee: David Rose

27 December 2004

Sedgley Park	22 - 3	Orrell
	Report

Park Lane
Attendance: 740
Referee: Mark Wilson

28 December 2004

Henley Hawks	18 - 14	London Welsh
	Report

Dry Leas
Attendance: 1,358
Referee: Bruce Robertson

=== Round 14 ===
2 January 2005

Pertemps Bees	30 - 22	Henley Hawks
	Report

Sharmans Cross
Attendance: 470
Referee: Llyr Apgeraint-Roberts

3 January 2005

Bristol Shoguns	P - P	Penzance & Newlyn

- Postponed. Game rescheduled to 12 February 2005.

3 January 2005

London Welsh	P - P	Exeter Chiefs

- Postponed. Game rescheduled to 12 February 2005.

3 January 2005

Nottingham	16 - 18	Coventry
	Report

Ireland Avenue
Attendance: 1,459
Referee: Robin Goodliffe

3 January 2005

Orrell	19 - 38	Otley
	Report

Edge Hall Road
Attendance: 364
Referee: Chris Sharp

3 January 2005

Plymouth Albion	24 - 19	Sedgley Park
	Report

Brickfields
Attendance: 3,109
Referee: Rob Debney

3 January 2005

Rotherham Titans	24 - 26	Bedford Blues
	Report

Clifton lane
Attendance: 1,821
Referee: Nigel Higginson

=== Round 15 ===
8 January 2005

Coventry	46 - 15	Orrell
	Report

Butts Park Arena
Referee: Nick Williams

8 January 2005

Exeter Chiefs	18 - 19	Plymouth Albion
	Report

County Ground
Attendance: 4,380
Referee: Bruce Robertson

8 January 2005

Henley Hawks	10-43	Bedford Blues
	Report

Dry Leas
Attendance: 865
Referee: Dean Richards

8 January 2005

London Welsh	3 - 43	Bristol Shoguns
	Report

Old Deer Park
Attendance: 1,900
Referee: Sean Davey

8 January 2005

Otley	37 - 5	Nottingham
	Report

Cross Green
Referee: Alan Biggs

8 January 2005

Sedgley Park	14 - 13	Rotherham Titans
	Report

Park Lane
Attendance: 380
Referee: Tim Beddow

9 January 2005

Penzance & Newlyn	19 - 10	Pertemps Bees
	Report

Mennaye Field
Attendance: 1,463
Referee: Martin Fox

=== Round 16 ===
15 January 2005

Bedford Blues	26 - 13	Otley
	Report

Goldington Road
Attendance: 2,089
Referee: Andrew Small

15 January 2005

Coventry	30 - 3	Penzance & Newlyn
	Report

Butts Park Arena
Referee: Nigel Higginson

15 January 2005

Exeter Chiefs	33 - 5	Henley Hawks
	Report

County Ground
Attendance: 1,268
Referee: Mark Wilson

15 January 2005

Nottingham	3 - 31	Plymouth Albion
	Report

Ireland Avenue
Attendance: 776
Referee: Tim Beddow

15 January 2005

Orrell	9 - 29	Rotherham Titans
	Report

Edge Hall Road
Attendance: 316
Referee: Gareth Copsey

15 January 2005

Pertemps Bees	14 - 13	London Welsh
	Report

Sharmans Cross
Attendance: 450
Referee: Dean Richards

16 January 2005

Bristol Shoguns	62 - 9	Sedgley Park
	Report

Memorial Stadium
Attendance: 4,087
Referee: Alan Biggs

=== Round 17 ===
22 January 2005

Bedford Blues	20 - 39	Exeter Chiefs
	Report

Goldington Road
Attendance: 2,143
Referee: Tim Beddow

22 January 2005

Henley Hawks	14 - 50	Coventry
	Report

Dry Leas
Attendance: 514
Referee: Wayne Barnes

22 January 2005

Otley	36 - 3	Sedgley Park
	Report

Cross Green
Referee: Bruce Robertson

22 January 2005

Pertemps Bees	38 - 25	Orrell
	Report

Sharmans Cross
Referee: Rob Debney

22 January 2005

Plymouth Albion	P - P	Bristol Shoguns

- Postponed. Game rescheduled to 19 March 2005.

22 January 2005

Rotherham Titans	43 - 13	London Welsh
	Report

Clifton Lane
Attendance: 1,200
Referee: David Rose

23 January 2005

Penzance & Newlyn	38 - 25	Nottingham
	Report

Mennaye Field
Attendance: 1,562
Referee: Dean Richards

=== Round 18 ===
29 January 2005

Exeter Chiefs	27 - 21	Penzance & Newlyn
	Report

County Ground
Attendance: 2,483
Referee: Nigel Higginson

29 January 2005

London Welsh	33 - 43	Coventry
	Report

Old Deer Park
Attendance: 1,100
Referee: S Leyshon

29 January 2005

Orrell	18 - 29	Bedford Blues
	Report

Edge Hall Road
Attendance: 268
Referee: David Rose

29 January 2005

Otley	17 - 6	Pertemps Bees
	Report

Cross Green
Referee: Tim Beddow

29 January 2005

Plymouth Albion	40 - 23	Rotherham Titans
	Report

Brickfields
Attendance: 3,511
Referee: Tim Wigglesworth

29 January 2005

Sedgley Park	20 - 21	Henley Hawks
	Report

Park Lane
Attendance: 417
Referee: Gareth Copsey

30 January 2005

Bristol Shoguns	43 - 0	Nottingham
	Report

Memorial Stadium
Attendance: 4,529
Referee: Rob Debney

=== Round 13 (rescheduled games) ===
5 February 2005

Coventry	50 - 7	Pertemps Bees
	Report

Butts Park Arena
Attendance: 2,000
Referee: Gareth Copsey

5 February 2005

Exeter Chiefs	23 - 12	Bristol Shoguns
	Report

County Ground
Attendance: 4,187
Referee: Andrew Small

=== Round 1 & 14 (rescheduled games) ===
12 February 2005

Bristol Shoguns	11-18	Penzance & Newlyn
	Report

Memorial Stadium
Attendance: 5,424
Referee: Mark Wilson

12 February 2005

Bedford Blues	12-17	Rotherham Titans
	Report

Goldington Road
Attendance: 1,712
Referee: Robin Goodliffe

12 February 2005

London Welsh	5-14	Exeter Chiefs
	Report

Old Deer Park
Attendance: 760
Referee: Llyr Apgeraint-Roberts

=== Round 19 ===
19 February 2005

Bedford Blues	16 - 17	London Welsh
	Report

Goldington Road
Attendance: 2,047
Referee: Carlo Damasco

19 February 2005

Coventry	25 - 25	Plymouth Albion
	Report

Butts Park Arena
Referee: Wayne Barnes

19 February 2005

Henley Hawks	12 - 13	Otley
	Report

Dry Leas
Attendance: 512
Referee: Tim Wigglesworth

19 February 2005

Orrell	25 - 36	Exeter Chiefs
	Report

Edge Hall Road
Attendance: 263
Referee: Martin Fox

19 February 2005

Nottingham	19 - 12	Rotherham Titans
	Report

Ireland Avenue
Attendance: 1,350
Referee: Nigel Higginson

19 February 2005

Pertemps Bees	0 - 23	Bristol Shoguns
	Report

Sharmans Cross
Attendance: 650
Referee: Tim Beddow

20 February 2005

Penzance & Newlyn	36 - 29	Sedgley Park
	Report

Mennaye Field
Attendance: 1,436
Referee: Alan Biggs

=== Round 20 ===
26 February 2005

Exeter Chiefs	47 - 17	Nottingham
	Report

County Ground
Attendance: 1,530
Referee: Alan Biggs

26 February 2005

London Welsh	16 - 3	Orrell
	Report

Old Deer Park
Attendance: 350
Referee: Rob Debney

26 February 2005

Penzance & Newlyn	17 - 20	Otley
	Report

Mennaye Field
Referee: Geraint Ashton-Jones

26 February 2005

Plymouth Albion	25 - 17	Pertemps Bees
	Report

Brickfields
Attendance: 2,630
Referee: Bruce Robertson

26 February 2005

Rotherham Titans	13 - 20	Coventry
	Report

Clifton Lane
Attendance: 1,030
Referee: Llyr Apgeraint-Roberts

26 February 2005

Sedgley Park	12 - 23	Bedford Blues
	Report

Park Lane
Attendance: 525
Referee: Dean Richards

28 February 2005

Bristol Shoguns	59 - 14	Henley Hawks
	Report

Memorial Stadium
Attendance: 3,853
Referee: Gareth Copsey

=== Round 8 (rescheduled game) ===
5 March 2005

Exeter Chiefs	41 - 15	Otley
	Report

County Ground
Attendance: 1,673
Referee: Tim Beddow

=== Round 21 ===
12 March 2005

Bedford Blues	23 - 28	Penzance & Newlyn
	Report

Goldington Road
Attendance: 1,576
Referee: Mark Wilson

12 March 2005

Coventry	17 - 27	Bristol Shoguns
	Report

Butts Park Arena
Attendance: 1,700
Referee: Tim Beddow

12 March 2005

Henley Hawks	13 - 10	Nottingham
	Report

Dry Leas
Attendance: 521
Referee: Bruce Robertson

12 March 2005

Orrell	27 - 32	Plymouth Albion
	Report

Edge Hall Road
Attendance: 237
Referee: N Williams

12 March 2005

Otley	27 - 7	Exeter Chiefs
	Report

Cross Green
Attendance: 810
Referee: Carlo Damasco

12 March 2005

Pertemps Bees	6 - 35	Rotherham Titans
	Report

Sharmans Cross
Attendance: 300
Referee: Chris Sharp

12 March 2005

Sedgley Park	46 - 27	London Welsh
	Report

Park Lane
Attendance: 540
Referee: Andrew Small

=== Round 17 (rescheduled game) ===
19 March 2005

Plymouth Albion	23 - 38	Bristol Shoguns
	Report

Brickfields
Attendance: 5,354
Referee: David Rose

=== Round 22 ===
26 March 2005

London Welsh	27 - 14	Henley Hawks
	Report

Old Deer Park
Attendance: 1,860
Referee: Martin Fox

26 March 2005

Nottingham	12 - 20	Bedford Blues
	Report

Ireland Avenue
Attendance: 875
Referee: Richard Draper

26 March 2005

Orrell	11 - 26	Sedgley Park
	Report

Edge Hall Road
Referee: Robin Goodliffe

26 March 2005

Pertemps Bees	15 - 19	Coventry
	Report

Sharmans Cross
Attendance: 600
Referee: S Leyshon

26 March 2005

Plymouth Albion	26 - 22	Penzance & Newlyn
	Report

Brickfields
Attendance: 4,403
Referee: Tim Wigglesworth

26 March 2005

Rotherham Titans	6 - 26	Otley
	Report

Clifton Lane
Attendance: 1,300
Referee: Bruce Robertson

27 March 2005

Bristol Shoguns	68 - 15	Exeter Chiefs
	Report

Memorial Stadium
Attendance: 10,349
Referee: Tim Beddow

=== Round 23 ===
2 April 2005

Bedford Blues	39 - 21	Plymouth Albion
	Report

Goldington Road
Attendance: 1,916
Referee: Gareth Copsey

2 April 2005

Exeter Chiefs	44 - 23	Sedgley Park
	Report

County Ground
Attendance: 1,516
Referee: Martin Fox

2 April 2005

Henley Hawks	59 - 41	Orrell
	Report

Dry Leas
Attendance: 520
Referee: Nick Williams

2 April 2005

Nottingham	33 - 14	Pertemps Bees
	Report

Ireland Avenue
Referee: Chris Sharp

2 April 2005

Otley	17 - 16	Coventry
	Report

Cross Green
Referee: Robin Goodliffe

3 April 2005

Bristol Shoguns	43 - 13	Rotherham Titans
	Report

Memorial Stadium
Attendance: 7,053
Referee: Tim Wigglesworth

3 April 2005

Penzance & Newlyn	45 - 14	London Welsh
	Report

Mennaye Field
Attendance: 1,500
Referee: Rob Debney

=== Round 24 ===
9 April 2005

Coventry	27 - 22	Exeter Chiefs
	Report

Butts Park Arena
Attendance: 1,200
Referee: Mark Wilson

9 April 2005

London Welsh	20 - 14	Otley
	Report

Old Deer Park
Attendance: 1,150
Referee: Geraint-Ashton Jones

9 April 2005

Orrell	5 - 53	Bristol Shoguns
	Report

Edge Hall Road
Attendance: 462
Referee: Alan Biggs

9 April 2005

Pertemps Bees	18 - 29	Bedford Blues
	Report

Sharmans Cross
Referee: Llyr Apgeraint-Roberts

9 April 2005

Plymouth Albion	37 - 25	Henley Hawks
	Report

Brickfields
Attendance: 2,080
Referee: Rob Debney

9 April 2005

Rotherham Titans	25 - 34	Penzance & Newlyn
	Report

Clifton Lane
Attendance: 950
Referee: Carlo Damasco

9 April 2005

Sedgley Park	0 - 11	Nottingham
	Report

Park Lane
Attendance: 444
Referee: Tim Beddow

=== Round 25 ===
23 April 2005

Bedford Blues	33 - 20	Bristol Shoguns
	Report

Goldington Road
Attendance: 3,284
Referee: Mark Wilson

23 April 2005

Exeter Chiefs	35 - 17	Pertemps Bees
	Report

County Ground
Attendance: 2,241
Referee: Martin Fox

23 April 2005

Henley Hawks	19 - 16	Rotherham Titans
	Report

Dry Leas
Referee: Roy Maybank

23 April 2005

Nottingham	30 - 40	London Welsh
	Report

Ireland Avenue
Attendance: 2,122
Referee: Sean Davey

23 April 2005

Otley	24 - 17	Plymouth Albion
	Report

Cross Green
Referee: Tim Beddow

23 April 2005

Sedgley Park	22 - 44	Coventry
	Report

Park Lane
Attendance: 743
Referee: Rowan Kitt

24 April 2005

Penzance & Newlyn	50 - 14	Orrell
	Report

Mennaye Field
Attendance: 1,848
Referee: Nick Williams

=== Round 26 ===
30 April 2005

Coventry	47 - 29	Bedford Blues
	Report

Butts Park Arena
Referee: Chris Sharp

30 April 2005

Henley Hawks	26 - 38	Penzance & Newlyn
	Report

Dry Leas
Attendance: 1,008
Referee: Tim Wigglesworth

30 April 2005

Orrell	25 - 17	Nottingham
	Report

Edge Hall Road
Attendance: 386
Referee: Gareth Copsey

30 April 2005

Otley	13 - 16	Bristol Shoguns
	Report

Cross Green
Referee: Rob Debney

30 April 2005

Pertemps Bees	57 - 19	Sedgley Park
	Report

Sharmans Cross
Attendance: 425
Referee: Richard Draper

30 April 2005

Plymouth Albion	28 - 12	London Welsh
	Report

Brickfields
Attendance: 3,025
Referee: Llyr Apgeraint-Roberts

30 April 2005

Rotherham Titans	33 - 41	Exeter Chiefs
	Report

Clifton Lane
Attendance: 1,000
Referee: Andrew Small

== Total Season Attendances ==
Club	Home Games	Total	Average	Highest	Lowest	% Capacity
Bedford Blues	13	26,733	2,056	3,949	1,224	41%
Bristol Shoguns	13	68,040	5,234	10,349	3,853	43%
Coventry	7 (Note: Missing home attendances v Sedgley Park on 4 December 2004, Orrell on 8 January 2005, Penzance & Newlyn on 15 January 2005, Plymouth Albion on 19 February 2005 and Bedford Blues on 30 April 2005.)	12,400	1,771	2,700	950	44%
Exeter Chiefs	13	25,462	1,959	4,380	1,032	34%
Henley Hawks	11 (Note: Missing home attendances v Plymouth Albion on 20 November 2004 and Rotherham on 23 April 2005.)	7,822	711	1,358	410	18%
London Welsh	13	14,020	1,078	1,900	350	24%
Nottingham	12 (Note: Missing home attendances v Pertemps Bees on 26 March 2005.)	11,232	936	2,122	560	19%
Orrell	12 (Note: Missing home attendance v Sedgley Park on 26 March 2005.)	4,321	360	650	237	7%
Otley	5 (Note: Missing home attendances v Penzance & Newlyn on 23 October 2004, Rotherham Titans on 27 December 2004, Nottingham on 8 January 2005, Sedgley Park on 22 January 2005, Pertemps Bees on 29 January 2005, Coventry on 2 April 2005, Plymouth Albion on 23 April 2005 and Bristol Shoguns on 30 April 2005.)	3,641	728	811	620	10%
Penzance & Newlyn	12 (Note: Missing home attendance v Otley on 26 February 2005.)	24,018	2,002	5,000	1,436	54%
Pertemps Bees	9 (Note: Missing home attendances v Plymouth Albion on 23 October 2004, Nottingham on 13 November 2004, Orrell on 22 January 2005 and Bedford Blues on 9 April 2005.)	4,345	483	650	300	12%
Plymouth Albion	13	41,754	3,212	5,354	1,949	49%
Rotherham Titans	12 (Note: Missing home attendance v Plymouth Albion on 2 October 2004.)	16,051	1,338	2,000	950	54%
Sedgley Park	13	6,749	519	743	320	17%

== Individual statistics ==
- Note that points scorers includes tries as well as conversions, penalties and drop goals.

=== Top points scorers ===
Rank	Player	Team	Appearances	Points
1	(England) Leigh Hinton	Bedford Blues	25	347
2	(Wales) Jason Strange	Bristol Shoguns	22	287
3	(England) Tony Yapp	Exeter Chiefs	24	285
4	(Canada) James Pritchard	Plymouth Albion	24	256
5	(New Zealand) Blair Feeney	Sedgley Park	26	253
6	(England) Simon Binns	Otley	26	241
7	(Wales) Lee Jarvis	Penzance & Newlyn	24	235
8	(Australia) Tim Walsh	Pertemps Bees	25	192
9	(Scotland) Neil Stenhouse	Nottingham	25	147
10	(Wales) Dylan Pugh	London Welsh	20	139

=== Top try scorers ===
Rank	Player	Team	Appearances	Tries
1	(England) Sean Marsden	Bristol Shoguns	24	21
2	(England) David Strettle	Rotherham Titans	22	18
3	(Argentina) Bernardo Stortoni	Rotherham Titans / Bristol Shoguns	21	15
3	(England) Nick Baxter	Pertemps Bees	22	15
4	(Canada) James Pritchard	Plymouth Albion	24	13
4	(England) Richard Baxter	Exeter Chiefs	26	13
4	(England) Jon Feeley	Sedgley Park	26	13
5	(England) Dan Ward-Smith	Plymouth Albion	24	12
5	(England) Richard Lloyd	Nottingham	25	12
5	(England) Wes Davies	Penzance & Newlyn	26	12

== Season records ==
=== Team ===
Largest home win — 53 pts (x2)

62 - 9 Bristol Shoguns at home to Sedgley Park on 16 January 2005
68 - 15 Bristol Shoguns at home to Exeter Chiefs on 27 March 2005

Largest away win — 48 pts

53 - 5 Bristol Shoguns away to Orrell on 9 April 2005

Most points scored — 68 pts

68 - 15 Bristol Shoguns at home to Exeter Chiefs on 27 March 2005

Most tries in a match — 10

Bristol Shoguns away to Nottingham on 2 October 2005

Most conversions in a match — 8 (x2)

Rotherham Titans at home to Orrell on 18 September 2004
Bristol Shoguns at home to Sedgley Park on 16 January 2005

Most penalties in a match — 9

Coventry at home to Otley on 13 November 2004

Most drop goals in a match — 2

Bristol Shoguns at home to London Welsh on 12 September 2004

=== Player ===
Most points in a match — 27 (x2)

(Italy) Ramiro Pez for Rotherham Titans at home to Orrell on 18 September 2004
(England) Matthew Leek for Coventry at home to Otley on 13 November 2004

Most tries in a match — 4 (x2)

(England) Dan Ward-Smith for Plymouth Albion at home to Coventry on 9 October 2004
(England) Sean Marsden for Bristol Shoguns away to Orrell on 9 April 2005

Most conversions in a match — 8

(Italy) Ramiro Pez for Rotherham Titans at home to Orrell on 18 September 2004

Most penalties in a match — 9

(England) Matthew Leek for Coventry at home to Otley on 13 November 2004

Most drop goals in a match — 1

N/A - multiple players

=== Attendances ===
Highest — 10,349

Bristol Shoguns at home to Exeter Chiefs on 27 March 2005

Lowest — 237 (Note: As there are a number of attendances missing this season it is possible that there were lower attendances than the one recorded.)

Orrell at home to Plymouth Albion on 12 March 2005

Highest Average Attendance — 5,234

Bristol Shoguns

Lowest Average Attendance — 360 (Note: As Orrell had 1 home game missing from the attendance statistics this figure is not 100% accurate.)

Orrell

== See also ==
- English rugby union system
