= Calum Cusiter =

Scottish rugby union player

- Born: Calum Cusiter; 21 October 1980 (age 46) Aberdeen, Scotland
- Height: 1.70 m (5 ft 7 in)
- Weight: 86 kg (13 st 8 lb)
- Notable relative(s): Chris Cusiter, brother

Rugby union career
- Position: Scrum-Half
Amateur team(s)
Years	Team	Apps	(Points)
- Boroughmuir
Senior career
Years	Team	Apps	(Points)
2005-06	Glasgow Warriors		
2006-07	Border Reivers		
Provincial / State sides
Years	Team	Apps	(Points)
2001	Edinburgh District		
International career
Years	Team	Apps	(Points)
1999	Scotland U21		
2006	Scotland Club XV		
National sevens team
Years	Team		Comps
2007	Scotland 7s		

Calum Cusiter (born 21 October 1980 in Aberdeen, Scotland), is a retired Scottish 7s international rugby union player, formerly of Glasgow Warriors and Border Reivers. Cusiter played at Scrum-Half. He is the elder brother of former Scotland captain Chris Cusiter.

== Rugby Union career ==
=== Amateur career ===
Cusiter played for Boroughmuir at amateur level.

He also represented Edinburgh District when the Scottish Inter-District Championship returned to its amateur roots during the Scottish professional teams sojourn in the Welsh-Scottish League.

=== Professional career ===
In season 2005-06, Cusiter joined Glasgow Warriors on a trial. He played once that season for the Glasgow side, coming on as a substitute in the pre-season match against rivals Edinburgh Rugby. Edinburgh won the match 24 - 7.

In season 2006-07 Cusiter started with Glasgow Warriors. He played in Glasgow's match against the Scotland U20 team in November 2006.

He was shortly afterwards loaned out and played for Border Reivers at professional level for the rest of that season.

=== International career ===
Cusiter played for the Scotland Under 21 side in 1999.

He also played for the Scotland Club XV international side in 2006. He played for Scotland in the Club XV international match against Ireland.

Cusiter was called into the Scotland 7's squad in 2007, playing in both the New Zealand and USA legs of the series.
