= Francisco Leonelli =

Argentine rugby union player (born 1978)

- Born: May 3, 1978 (age 48)
- Height: 6 ft 2 in (1.88 m)
- Weight: 211 lb (96 kg; 15 st 1 lb)

Rugby union career
- Position(s): Fullback, Wing
Senior career
Years	Team	Apps	(Points)
2006-07	Glasgow Warriors	8	(13)
International career
Years	Team	Apps	(Points)
2001-2009	Argentina	16	(40)
National sevens team
Years	Team		Comps
- Argentina 7s

Francisco Leonelli (born 3 May 1978) is an Argentine rugby union footballer, currently playing for Saracens F.C. in the Guinness Premiership. He has represented the Argentina national team, having previously playing for the under-19s and under-21s Argentina sides. His usual position is at fullback though he also plays on the wing.

He played for Argentina during their two Test series win over Wales at home in June 2006, including scoring a try in the 27 to 25 victory. Before playing for the Warriors he played for fellow Scottish club Edinburgh. Leonelli joined Saracens on 2 August 2007.

In his first season for Saracens, Leonelli was part of the side that reached the semi-finals of the EDF Energy Cup and the Heineken Cup for the first time in the club's history. He scored the team's try in their famous 19-10 win over the Ospreys in the quarter-final of the Heineken Cup.

After being released by Saracens he has moved back to Argentina to play for La Tablada.
