= Sam Pinder =

Scotland international rugby union player

- Born: Jared Sam Pinder; 15 February 1979 (age 47) Taupō, New Zealand
- Height: 1.86 m (6 ft 1 in)
- Weight: 88 kg (13 st 12 lb)
- University: Auckland College of Education

Rugby union career
- Position: Scrum-Half
Amateur team(s)
Years	Team	Apps	(Points)
1999–2000	Otamatea		
2001	Waipu		
–	GHA		
–	Ayr RFC		
Senior career
Years	Team	Apps	(Points)
2003–09	Glasgow Warriors	106	(122)
- Correct as of 18 December 2012
Provincial / State sides
Years	Team	Apps	(Points)
1998	Northland		
Super Rugby
Years	Team	Apps	(Points)
-	Auckland Blues	0	(0)
International career
Years	Team	Apps	(Points)
1998	New Zealand U-19	1	(0)
2006	Scotland	2	(0)
- Correct as of 1 August 2015
Coaching career
- Years: Team
- 2009–present: Hong Kong RFU various roles
- 2009–present: Causeway Bay director of rugby

Sam Pinder (born 15 February 1979 in Taupō, New Zealand), is a Scottish rugby union player formerly of Glasgow Warriors and Scotland. Pinder played at Scrum-Half.

The player qualified to represent the Scottish national rugby union team as his grandmother came from Port Seton near Edinburgh. The scrum half played for Scotland against the Barbarians at Murrayfield on 31 May 2006. Pinder got his first of his two international caps on tour for Scotland on 10 June 2006 in Durban; the second on 17 June 2006 in Port Elizabeth; both against South Africa.

He is a Glasgow Warriors centurion having played over 100 matches for the club. He left the club in 2009 to go to Hong Kong where he has been employed in various roles with the Hong Kong RFU notably as running their Sevens team and as being the Director of Rugby at Causeway Bay RFC.

== Personal Information ==
Pinder is married to Anna Pinder, a netball coach who was formerly a member of the Glasgow Wildcats.

== See also ==
- SCAA Causeway Bay RFC
