= Andrew Henderson (rugby union) =

Scotland international rugby union player

- Born: Andrew Roger Henderson; 3 February 1980 (age 46) Kent, England
- Height: 1.93 m (6 ft 4 in)
- Weight: 97 kg (15 st 4 lb)
- School: Lenzie Academy

Rugby union career
- Position: Centre
Amateur team(s)
| Years | Team | Apps | (Points) |
- Glasgow Thistles
- West of Scotland
- Glasgow Hawks
| 2008-09 | West of Scotland | | |
| 2011-16 | Glasgow Hutchesons Aloysians | 102 | (170) |
Senior career
| Years | Team | Apps | (Points) |
| 2000–09 | Glasgow Warriors | 140 | (65) |
| 2009–10 | Montauban | | |
| 2010–11 | Newcastle Falcons | | |
International career
| Years | Team | Apps | (Points) |
| 2001–08 | Scotland | 53 | (40) |

Andrew Roger Henderson (born 3 February 1980) is a Scottish rugby union footballer who played at centre; who was capped 53 times and scored eight tries for Scotland.

== Early life ==
Henderson was born on 3 February 1980 in Chatham in Kent, England. He was educated at Lenzie primary school and Lenzie Academy.

== Rugby career ==
Henderson played rugby union for West of Scotland at stand off as a youngster before moving to Glasgow Hawks, then Glasgow Warriors where he was preferred at centre.

Playing as a centre, apart from one outing on the wing (versus Wales 2004), he made his debut in the blue of Scotland in 2001 as a second-half replacement against Ireland. The Scots won 32–10 with Henderson scoring the fourth try. His final game for Scotland was in 2008.

In March 2009, Henderson joined Montauban in France on a three-year contract. Due to financial difficulties and relegation from the Top 14 at Montauban, he was released at the end of 2010 season. He returned to Glasgow in the summer of 2011 to play with Glasgow Hutchesons Aloysians, where as Club Captain he appeared 102 times over five seasons.

He is often called "Muffles" because of his hair used to cover his ears.

He presented the match ball on 2 January 2016 for the Glasgow Warriors re-located second leg of the 1872 Cup match against Edinburgh at Murrayfield Stadium.
