= Andy Newman (rugby union) =

Welsh rugby union player

- Born: Andrew Newman; 7 January 1978 (age 48) Leicester, Leicestershire, England
- Height: 6 ft 7 in (2.01 m)
- Weight: 122 kg (19 st 3 lb)

Rugby union career
- Position: Lock
Amateur team(s)
Years	Team	Apps	(Points)
- Neath
–	Swansea		
Senior career
Years	Team	Apps	(Points)
- Northampton Saints
2003-06	Ospreys	75	(30)
2006-08	Glasgow Warriors	45	(5)
–	Grenoble		
–	London Scottish		
International career
Years	Team	Apps	(Points)
- Wales U21
–	Wales A		

Andrew Newman (born 7 January 1978 in Leicester, England) is a former Welsh international rugby union player who played for Glasgow Warriors at the Lock position.

== Rugby Union career ==
=== Amateur career ===
Newman played for Neath and Swansea at amateur level.

=== Professional career ===
He started at Northampton Saints and won the Heineken Cup with them in 2000 but he finished playing with them in 2001.

He moved on to play with the Ospreys in 2003. He made 75 appearances for the Welsh team and scored 6 tries with them. He won the Celtic League while with Ospreys.

He signed for Glasgow Warriors in 2006.

He also played for Grenoble and London Scottish.

=== International career ===
He was capped by Wales at U21 level and at 'A' grade.

== Business career ==
He moved into Finance and now works with LGT Vestra.
