= Hefin O'Hare =

Wales international rugby league & union footballer

- Born: Hefon O'Hare; 2 June 1979 (age 47) Wrexham, Wales
- Height: 5 ft 11 in (1.80 m)
- Weight: 13 st 2 lb (83 kg)
- University: Glasgow Caledonian University

Rugby union career
- Position(s): Wing, Centre
Amateur team(s)
Years	Team	Apps	(Points)
2008-09	Edinburgh Academicals		
2009-11	Dundee HSFP		
2011-	Glasgow Hutchesons Aloysians		
Senior career
Years	Team	Apps	(Points)
1997-99	Leeds Carnegie		
2005-11	Glasgow Warriors	121	(100)
National sevens team
Years	Team		Comps
	Scotland 7s		6
- Rugby league career

Playing information
- Position: Fullback, Wing, Centre, Hooker, Lock
Club
Years	Team	Pld	T	G	FG	P
1999–2000	Leeds Rhinos
2000–05	Huddersfield Giants
	Total	0	0	0	0	0
Representative
Years	Team	Pld	T	G	FG	P
	Wales

Hefin O'Hare (born 2 June 1979) is a Welsh former professional rugby union and rugby league footballer who played in the 1990s, 2000s and 2010s. He played representative level rugby union (RU) for Scotland 7s, and at club level for New Brighton F.C., Leeds Carnegie, Glasgow Warriors, and the Scottish amateur sides Edinburgh Academical Football Club, Dundee HSFP and Glasgow Hutchesons Aloysians RFC, as a wing, or centre, and representative level rugby league (RL) for Wales, and at club level for Leeds Rhinos, and Huddersfield Giants, as a fullback, wing, centre, hooker, or loose forward.

== Background ==
Hefin O'Hare was born in Wrexham, Wales,

As of 2018, he is a Chartered Building Surveyor in Edinburgh, and regularly does charity work.

== Rugby league career ==
=== Professional career ===
Switching code from rugby union, O'Hare moved from Leeds Carnegie to Leeds Rhinos. He played for the Leeds rugby league side from 1999 to 2000, he was then transferred to Huddersfield Giants, where he played from 2000 to 2005.

=== International career ===
He played for Wales in the 2000 Rugby League World Cup.

== Rugby union career ==
=== Amateur career ===
While at the provincial district Glasgow Warriors, he was to play for various Scottish amateur sides.

In the 2008–09 season, O'Hare was at Edinburgh Academicals.

In the 2009-10 and 2010–11 season he played for Dundee HSFP.

After finishing his professional career, he then played for Glasgow Hutchesons Aloysians.

=== Professional career ===
O'Hare started playing rugby with Leeds Carnegie. He was with the Yorkshire club from 1997 to 1999. He then switched codes to play rugby league.

O'Hare joined Glasgow Warriors in 2005, switching code back from rugby league, to play rugby union once again.

=== International career ===
O'Hare qualified to play rugby union for Scotland after fulfilling his residency period. He stated: "It was a dream of mine to play for Scotland ever since I became eligible."

O'Hare was capped by Scotland 7s.
