= Calum Forrester =

Scottish rugby union player

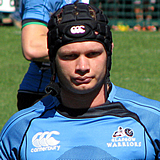
- Forrester in 2008
- Born: Calum Rudolph Forrester; 3 October 1986 (age 40)
- Height: 6 ft 2 in (1.88 m)
- Weight: 218 lb (99 kg)

Rugby union career
- Position: Flanker
Amateur team(s)
Years	Team	Apps	(Points)
2005–08	GHA Rugby		
2008–14	Ayr RFC		
Senior career
Years	Team	Apps	(Points)
2006–12	Glasgow Warriors	42	(5)
- Correct as of 5 May 2012
International career
Years	Team	Apps	(Points)
2004	Scotland U18	1	(0)
2005	Scotland U19	7	(0)
2006	Scotland U21	2	(0)
2009–10	Scotland A	2	(5)
- Correct as of 20 June 2010
National sevens team
Years	Team		Comps
2006–07	Scotland 7s		8
Coaching career
- Years: Team
- 2015–18: Ayr RFC

Calum Forrester (born 3 October 1986) is a Scottish rugby union coach who formerly played professionally for Glasgow Warriors. He also played for the Scotland 7s and Scotland A national teams.

== Early life ==
Forrester attended Hutchesons Grammar School. He had two years at Glasgow University studying sports science and also enrolled in the Open University. Forrester was a member of Scottish Rugby's National Rugby Academy and has a Duke of Edinburgh Silver Award.

== International career ==
Forrester was a member of the Scotland Sevens squad for the 2004 Commonwealth Youth Games in Bendigo, Australia. He made his national team debut during the 2005–06 IRB Sevens World Series, playing in the 2006 London Sevens and Edinburgh Sevens tournaments. He played in four tournaments for the 2006–07 series and, after being selected to play for the Rugby Ecosse at the Singapore Sevens in October 2007, he continued in the Scotland squad for the 2007 tournaments in Dubai and George.

He represented Scotland at the 2005 IRB Under 19 World Championship, playing in all the team's matches at Durban in South Africa. Forrester also played for Scotland at the under-21 World Championship in 2006, joining the squad after the pool stage as a replacement for injured player Johnnie Beattie, and played as a substitute in the 46–14 win against Georgia in Issoire.

Forrester played for Scotland A, as part of the team that won the 2009 IRB Nations Cup in Romania.

== Domestic career ==
Forester joined professional side the Glasgow Warriors in 2006, but continued to play at Glasgow Hutchesons Aloysians (GHA) until 2008, before being selected to join Ayr RFC in August of that year, where he played until 2014.

He made his Celtic League debut for the Warriors as a replacement in the away match against the Cardiff Blues in September 2006. Forrester was played for the Warriors over a six-season span up to the 2011–12 season.

He was also in the Scottish Thistles squad who won the Melrose club's 125th anniversary sevens in April 2008.

== Coaching career ==
Following two years as club captain at Ayr RFC, Forrester took up the head coach position at the club in 2014. He won the BT Premiership in 2017 with a 12–8 victory over Melrose in the Grand Final.
