= Glasgow Hutchesons Aloysians RFC =

Scottish rugby union club, based in Giffnock

Coordinates: 55.808549°N 4.280934°W

(Scotland) GHA
- Full name: Glasgow Hutchesons' Aloysians Rugby Football Club
- Union: Scottish Rugby Union
- Founded: 2002; 24 years ago
- Location: Giffnock, East Renfrewshire, Scotland
- Ground: Braidholm
- President: Jonathan Kelly
- Coach(es): Jamie McCarthy (Head Coach), Colin Sturgeon, Andrew Goudie, Kevin Wyness, Ryan Jenkins (Strength & Conditioning).
- Captain: Michael Fox
- League: Scottish Premiership
- 2025–26: Scottish Premiership, 6th of 10
Team kit

Official website
- gharugby.co.uk

Glasgow Hutchesons Aloysians Rugby Football Club, often abbreviated to GHA and colloquially referred to as G-HA!! /ˈdʒiːhɑː/, is a rugby union club based in the Giffnock area of East Renfrewshire, Scotland. The club plays its home matches at Braidholm and currently competes in the Scottish Premiership since having been promoted at the end of the 2024-25 Scottish National League Division One season.

== History ==
The club was established by the 2002 merger between "Glasgow Southern RFC" and "Hutchesons' - Aloysians' RFC". The former club was originally known as Clarkston but was renamed in 1995 with the ambition of creating the premier side on the south side of Glasgow. The latter club was also formed as the result of an earlier merger between the former pupils (FPs) clubs of Hutchesons' Grammar School and St Aloysius' College. The merged club is now firmly established as the premier club on the south side of Glasgow.

=== Hutchesons' GSFP ===
The club was formed in 1923 playing at Auldhouse, the school's sports ground in Eastwood (near Thornliebank). Admitted as a full member of the Scottish Rugby Union in 1937, the Hutchesons’ Club entered the National League system in Season 1973 at 2nd Division level, having dispensed with tradition to some degree by opting for "Open" status two years previously, a significant decision forced, by necessity, on many Scottish F.P. Clubs at that time.

1990 was to see further constitutional change when the club agreed amalgamation with close friends and one time rivals to form Hutchesons' Aloysians R.F.C.

=== Old Aloysians RFC ===
By contrast, the Old Aloysians club was formed in 1955 for the sole purpose of undertaking a challenge match against the extremely successful Saint Aloysius' College 1st XV. The unexpected success of this venture resulted in a decision to seek regular fixtures which led to a continuing upsurge in interest and the inevitable and rapid expansion of the F.P. Club. The first fixture was against Hutchesons' Grammar FP RFC., coincident with the invitation from Hutchesons' Grammar School to Saint Aloysius' College 1st XV to undertake regular fixtures. This long standing friendship led to the amalgamation in season 1990–91.

=== Hutchesons Aloysians ===
Richard Allan was selected as the club's first full internationalist for the Irish fixture at Murrayfield in 1969, to be followed by other distinguished players who gained representative honours. Brothers Gordon and Alan Bulloch were to gain national caps, with the former captaining the national side on several occasions. Ray Nelson was to achieve caps for the United States national team the U.S. Eagles.

=== Clarkston RFC ===
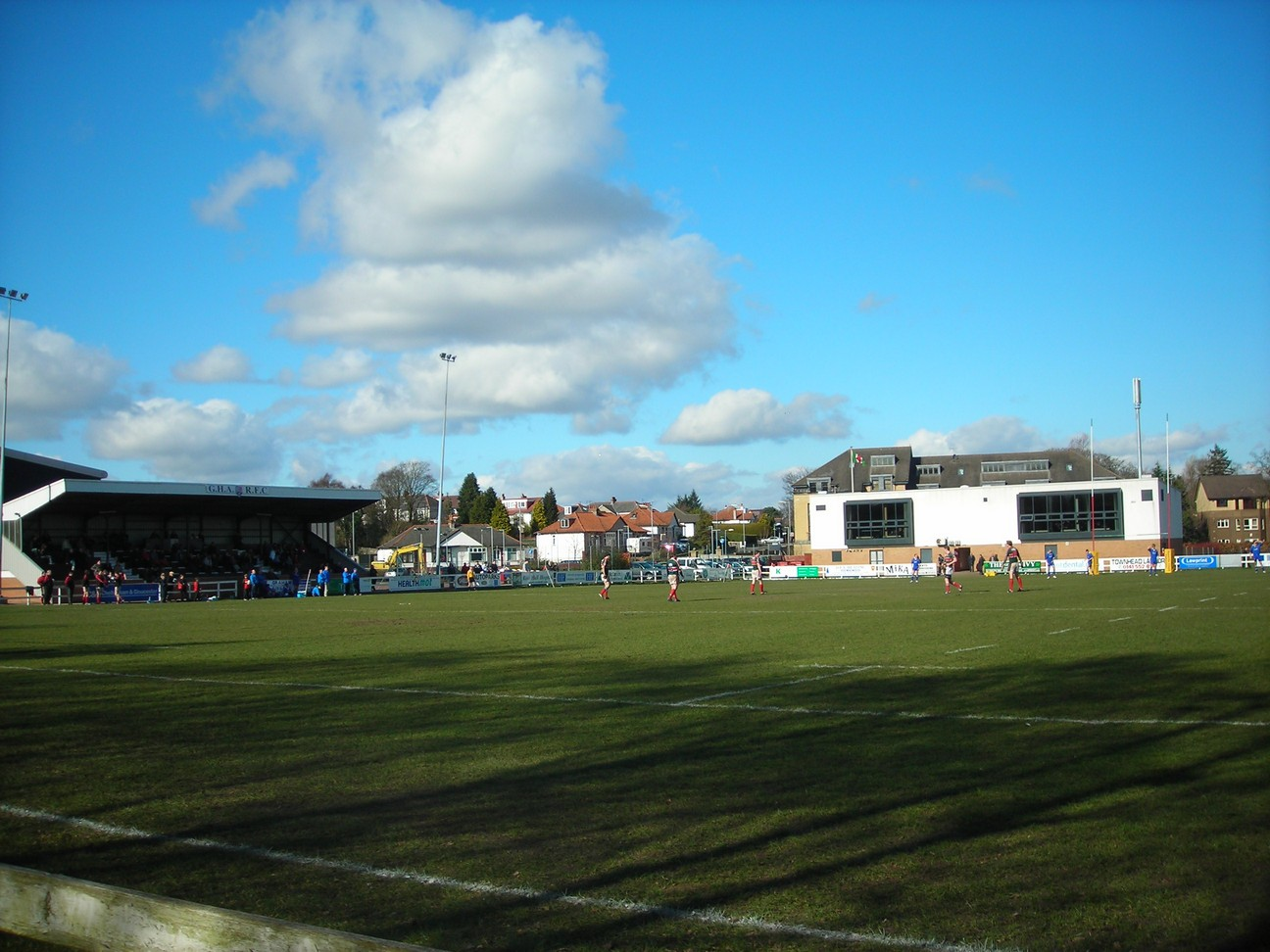
A view of the stand and club house at Braidholm, GHA's home field

Unlike the two Former Pupil Clubs now involved at Braidholm, Clarkston RFC, since its formation in 1937, had always been an "Open" club, created by a variety of former pupil rugby players who did not wish to undertake cross city travel to indulge in their sport. Significantly the first club chairman was a Glasgow Academical, the first President a Glasgow High former pupil and the longest serving club captain and coach, Andrew Williams a product of Allan Glen's.

Playing initially at the local authority's Overlee ground, years of tireless fund raising saw the club's new facility at Braidholm opened by S.R.U. President Charlie Drummond in January 1971. The club entered the new National League structure in 1973 at 4th Division level, rising through the years to division two. With three pitches, floodlights, 250 seater stand and expanded clubhouse, in recognition of its changing character and by a significant membership majority at the May 1995 A.G.M., the club altered its name to Glasgow Southern RFC.

=== Glasgow Southern RFC ===
Over several years a variety of players graduated through the Club participation from both youth and senior level to achieve representative status. Full International caps were awarded to Gordon McIlwham, and Euan Murray while others have achieved selection at Youth level.

=== Further development ===
Agreement reached with a development organisation saw the original 1970 clubhouse demolished to make way for a health club. A new, state of the art, clubhouse was formally opened by S.R.U. President Ronnie Young at Braidholm in January 2002. The Glasgow Southern name was only to survive for seven years before it became evident to all concerned that the sport on the south side of Glasgow would be best served through amalgamation, an initiative formalised in May 2002 with the formation of Glasgow Hutchesons' Aloysians Rugby Football Club. Plans for an all-weather artificial pitch at Braidholm were announced in 2018.

== Senior rugby ==
GHA operates four senior teams. The 1st XV and 2nd XV teams compete in national leagues, while the 3rd XV (the GHA Lions) competes in the regional reserve leagues. There is also a veterans team, the GHA Gazelles, captained by John Willock, which plays social, friendly, and touring matches.

=== Playing Overview ===
Following the amalgamation, GHA took the place of the newly promoted Hutchesons Aloysians in Premiership Division Two, with the new club achieving promotion to Premiership Division One at the first attempt. The club has since spent four seasons in the top division - 2003/04, 2004/05, 2007/08 and 2019/20. Following three seasons in Premiership Two which saw a wealth of the club's most experienced players depart, ended in relegation to Premiership Three for season 2011/12.

In Premiership Three, with the arrival of a new coaching team and experienced ex-professionals Andrew Henderson and Hefin O'Hare GHA managed to finish second but due to league restructuring were denied promotion. Within the newly regionalised third tier of 2012/13 the club achieved promotion by winning RBS Championship A thanks to a historic 23–0 final day, winner-takes-all match away to local rivals Cartha Queens Park.

Following a difficult first season back in the second tier the club once again had a complete change of coaching team, which almost saw a surprise return to the Premiership during season 2014/15, only to be denied 39–22 in a relegation / promotion play-off with Stirling County. In yet another severe reversal of fortunes, the club suffered a season of disappointment in 2015/16, flirted with relegation until safety was assured on the penultimate weekend of the season.

After two consecutive third-place finishes in National League One; GHA were elevated to the Premiership for season 2019/20 due to the restructuring of Scottish club rugby. With the creation of the SRU's new semi-professional Super 6 competition, six of the existing Premiership teams would be demoted to National League One with the top six teams in that league taking their place. The club had mixed success in a very competitive league; with very little separating play-off and relegation places, notable achievements did include first ever away victories at Edinburgh Accies and league leaders Marr. GHA secured their Premiership status with a losing bonus point in their final game against Selkirk. However, three weeks later the 2019/20 season was declared null and void by the SRU due to the coronavirus pandemic, with no promotion or relegation between leagues.

Club rugby finally returned for the 2020-21 season; with an influx of new, young players helping GHA secure their highest ever league finish of 6th place. However, the following season a downturn in fortunes saw the club slowly slide down the league before a late surge by Musselburgh RFC left the Braidholm side needing to secure a final-day victory at league leaders Hawick RFC to avoid the drop. Unfortunately, GHA fell just short and relegation was confirmed. The club were able to retain much of their squad for the 2023-24 National League One campaign and were able to finish runners-up to a highly dominant Ayr RFC.

Season	League	Position	Cup	Notes
2002-03	Premiership Two	2nd	Round of 16	Promoted to Premiership One
2003-04	Premiership One	9th	Round of 16	-
2004-05	Premiership One	11th	Round of 32	Relegated to Premiership Two
2005-06	Premiership Two	9th	Quarter-Finals	-
2006-07	Premiership Two	3rd	Round of 32	Promoted to Premiership One
2007-08	Premiership One	11th	Round of 32	Relegated to Premiership Two
2008-09	Premiership Two	6th	Round of 16	-
2009-10	Premiership Two	5th	Round of 32	-
2010-11	Premiership C	8th	Group Stage	Relegated to Premiership Three
2011–12	Premiership Three	2nd	Round of 16 (West)	-
2012–13	Championship A	1st	Group Stage (West)	Promoted to National League
2013-14	National League	8th	Runners-up (West)	-
2014-15	National One	2nd	Round of 16	Premiership / National One Play-off
2015-16	National One	7th	Round of 16	-
2016-17	National One	7th	Round of 32	-
2017-18	National One	3rd	Quarter-Finals (National League)	-
2018-19	National One	3rd	Round of 16	Promoted to Premiership
2019-20	Premiership	7th*	Round of 16	Season Null & Void due to Coronavirus Pandemic
2020-21	Premiership	-	-	Season Cancelled due to Coronavirus Pandemic
2021-22	Premiership	6th	-	No Cup Competition
2022-23	Premiership	10th	1st Round	Relegated to National One
2023-24	National One	2nd	1st Round	-
2024-25	National One	1st	Winner	Promoted to Premiership
2025-26	Premiership	6th	Semi-finals	-

=== Centurions Club ===
The following players have represented GHA's 1st XV on more than 100 occasions. Appearances for pre-amalgamation clubs are also included on this list.

Totals accurate to 11/04/2026.

#100	Name	Nationality	Position	Caps	Debut	100th Cap	Note
TBC	Andrew Healy	Scotland	Fly-Half / Full-Back	103	31/08/2002	Pre-GHA	*(100)
TBC	Alistair Menzies	Scotland	Full-Back	TBC	31/08/2002	-	*(TBC)
TBC	Euan Baillie	Scotland	Fly-Half	210	30/08/2003	Pre-GHA	†(200)
TBC	Rory Watson	Scotland	Wing	166	31/08/2002	04/12/2004	†(47)
TBC	John Fitzpatrick	Scotland	Back-Row	TBC	31/08/2002	-	†(TBC)
TBC	Ian Smith	Scotland	Lock	160	30/08/2003	-	*(110)
TBC	James Noonan	New Zealand	Fly-Half	173	31/08/2002	17/02/2007	*(40)
TBC	Richard Nolan	Scotland	Prop	TBC	31/08/2002	-	*(TBC)
TBC	Trevor Carmichael	Scotland	Lock	TBC	31/08/2002	-	†(TBC)
TBC	Martin Dunn	Scotland	Fly-Half	TBC	07/09/2002	19/01/2008	†(TBC)
TBC	Paul Harkins	Scotland	Back-Row	134	-	-	-
TBC	Niall Cassie	Scotland	Centre	131	-	-	-
TBC	Andrew Boag	Scotland	Back-Row / Scrum-Half	TBC	-	-	-
TBC	Ross McClymont	Scotland	Full-Back	117	-	-	-
TBC	Andrew Rushforth	Scotland	Centre	TBC	-	-	-
TBC	Zander McIlwham	Scotland	Prop	TBC	-	-	* (TBC)
TBC	Iain Nelson	Scotland	Hooker	TBC	31/08/2002	-	* (TBC)
TBC	Chris Binnie	Scotland	Centre / Full-Back	138	-	-	-
TBC	Andrew Williamson	Scotland	Lock	160	-	-	†(80)
20	Rangi Jericevich	Scotland	Wing	168	06/09/2003	28/09/2013	-
21	Ryan Jenkins	Scotland	Lock / Back-Row	118	08/12/2007	04/01/2014	-
221	Andrew Gillman	Scotland	Scrum-Half / Full-Back	164	30/08/2008	31/01/2015	-
23	Andrew Henderson	Scotland	Centre	102	27/08/2011	26/03/2016	-
24	Alan Auld	Scotland	Back-Row / Wing	100	29/10/2011	23/04/2016	*(1)
25	Jamie Auld	Scotland	Lock / Back-Row	116	03/10/2009	08/10/2016	-
26	Adam Barnett	Scotland	Lock	141	21/08/2010	27/01/2018	-
27	Scott Carson	Scotland	Prop	128	-	24/03/2018	-
28	Murray Houston	Scotland	Scrum-Half	107	20/03/2010	20/10/2018	-
29	Donald Malcolm	Scotland	Hooker / Back-Row	100	04/09/2004	10/11/2018	-
30	**Michael Fox**	Scotland	Prop	187	27/08/2011	09/10/2021	-
31	**Andrew Goudie**	Scotland	Fly-Half	153	30/08/2014	09/09/2023	-
32	**Dario Ewing**	Scotland	Hooker / Back-Row	140	17/09/2016	09/12/2023	-
33	**Adam Kerr**	Scotland	Lock / Back-Row	146	18/02/2017	09/12/2023	-
34	**George Baird**	Scotland	Scrum-Half	115	23/09/2017	14/12/2024	-
35	**Charlie Lonergan**	Scotland	Centre	110	05/09/2015	06/09/2025	-
36	**Luke McCutcheon**	Scotland	Back-Row	100	07/09/2019	11/04/2026	-

_{^{*}Appearances include games played for Glasgow Southern/Clarkston}
_{^{†}Appearances include games played for Hutchesons' Aloysians}
_{^{Bold}Active Players}

=== Records & Statistics ===
==== Individual Records ====
===== Appearances =====
Correct as of 28/09/2024, Current players in bold.

All-Time Most Appearances (Including Constituent Clubs)

#	Nat.	Pos.	Name	Period	Appearances
1	(Scotland)	FH	Euan Baillie	2003–2008	**210**
2	(New Zealand)	FH	James Noonan	2002–2010	**172**
3	(Scotland)	WG	Rangi Jericevich	2003–2016	**168**
4	(Scotland)	SH	Andrew Gillman	2008–2019	**164**
-	(Scotland)	WG	Rory Watson	2002–2009	**164**

All-Time Most Appearances (GHA Only)

#	Nat.	Pos.	Name	Period	Appearances
1	(Scotland)	WG	Rangi Jericevich	2003–2016	**168**
2	(Scotland)	SH	Andrew Gillman	2008–2019	**164**
3	(Scotland)	PR	**Michael Fox**	2011–	**154**
4	(Scotland)	LK	**Adam Barnett**	2010-	**141**
5	(Scotland)	FB	Chris Binnie	2007–2019	**138**

===== Points Scorers =====
Correct as of 28/09/2024, Current players in bold.

Top Points Scorers

#	Nat.	Pos.	Name	Period	Apps.	Tries	Cons.	Pens	Drop goals	Total points
1	(New Zealand)	FH	James Noonan	2002–2010	172	8	200	218	16	**1142**
2	(Scotland)	FH	**Andrew Goudie**	2014–	120	31	132	31	1	**515**
3	(Scotland)	SH	Murray Houston	2010–2019	111	9	96	58	-	**411**
4	(Scotland)	SH	Peter Jericevich	2008–2017	65	22	96	29	-	**389**
5	(Scotland)	WG	Rory Watson	2002–2009	164	69	-	-	-	**345**

- Most points: **1142** – James Noonan (2002-2010)
- Most league points: ? –
- Most cup points: **113** – James Noonan (2002-2010)
- Most points in a game by a player: **30** - George Baird (v Stewart's Melville RFC, in National League One, 09 September 2017
- Most points scored in a single season: **208** – James Noonan in 2002–2003 & 2009-2010
- Most points scored in a calendar year: ? – ? in 0000
- Most points scored on debut: ?-? (v ?, in ?, 00 January 0000

Top Try Scorers

#	Nat.	Pos.	Name	Period	Tries
1	(Scotland)	WG	Rory Watson	2002-2009	**69**
2	(Scotland)	CE	Niall Cassie	2005-2015	**60**
3	(Scotland)	WG	Rangi Jericevich	2003-2016	**55**
4	(Scotland)	SH	Andrew Gillman	2008-2019	**45**
5	(New Zealand)	N8	Jamie Pinder	2008-2013	**42**

- Most tries: **69** – Rory Watson (2002-2009)
- Most league tries: ? –
- Most cup tries: **12** – Rangi Jericevich (2003-2016) & Rory Watson (2002-2008)
- Most tries in a game by a player: **4** – Alan Auld (v Peebles (H), 2015-2016 National League One, 3/10/2015) & Niall Cassie (v Peebles (H), 2010-2011 Premiership Two, 23/10/2010)
- Most tries scored in a single season: **20** – Rangi Jericevich (2012-2013 season)
- Most tries scored in a calendar year: ? – in 0000
- Most tries scored on debut: ? – (versus, on 00 January 0000)

==== Team Records ====
Matches

- First Competitive match: GHA RFC **23-20** Ayr RFC (in Premiership Two, 31 August 2002)
- First Scottish Premiership match: Stirling County RFC **39-24** GHA RFC (30 August 2003)
- First Scottish Cup match: GHA RFC **22-9** Livingston RFC (3rd Round (Last 64), 2 November 2002}
- First Billy Barnes Cup match: Cartha Queens Park RFC **27-34** GHA RFC (2 September 2017)

Record Wins All stats correct up to 24/10/2021

- Biggest Win: GHA RFC **87-0** Perthshire RFC (Scottish Cup 1st Round (Last 64), 30 August 2014)
- Biggest League Win: GHA RFC **87-3** Kirkcaldy RFC (National League One, 29 September 2018)
- Biggest Cup Win: GHA RFC **87-0** Perthshire RFC (Scottish Cup 1st Round (Last 64), 30 August 2014)
- Biggest Home Win: GHA RFC **87-0** Perthshire RFC (Scottish Cup 1st Round (Last 64), 30 August 2014)
- Biggest Away Win: Stewart's Melville RFC **5-66** GHA RFC (National League One, 1 October 2016)

Record defeats All stats correct up to 24/10/2021

- Biggest Defeat: Boroughmuir RFC **76-5** GHA RFC (National League, 23 March 2014)
- Biggest League Defeat: Boroughmuir RFC **76-5** GHA RFC (National League, 23 March 2014)
- Biggest Cup Defeat: Glasgow Hawks '**64-5** GHA RFC (Scottish Cup 3rd Round (Last 16), 27 February 2016)
- Biggest Home Defeat: GHA RFC **0-44** Stewart's Melville RFC (National League, 24 August 2013)
- Biggest Away Defeat: Boroughmuir RFC **76-5** GHA RFC (National League, 23 March 2014)

Other match records All stats correct up to 24/10/2021

- Highest Scoring Draw: Haddington RFC **29-29** GHA RFC (Premiership Two, 26 September 2009)
- Lowest Scoring Draw: GHA RFC **6-6** Selkirk RFC (Premiership Two, 19 October 2002) & Ayr RFC **6-6** GHA RFC (Premiership One, 15 December 2007)
- Highest Scoring Home Draw: GHA RFC **17-17** Cartha Queens Park RFC (Premiership Two, 16 September 2006)
- Lowest Scoring Home Draw: GHA RFC **6-6** Selkirk RFC (Premiership Two, 19 October 2002)
- Highest Scoring Away Draw: Haddington RFC **29-29** GHA RFC (Premiership Two, 26 September 2009)
- Lowest Scoring Away Draw: Ayr RFC **6-6** GHA RFC (Premiership One, 15 December 2007)

High scores and bonus points All stats correct up to 24/10/2021

- Most points scored
  - In a Win: **87** (GHA RFC 87-0 Perthshire RFC (Scottish Cup 1st Round (Last 64), 30 August 2014) & (GHA RFC 87-3 Kirkcaldy RFC (National League One), 29 September 2018)
  - In a Defeat: **47** (Aberdeen Grammar 57-47 GHA RFC, 12 October 2019)
- Most points conceded
  - In a Win: **47** (Hamilton RFC 47-50 GHA RFC, 10 November 2018)
  - In a Defeat: **76** (Boroughmuir RFC 76-5 GHA RFC, 22 March 2014)
- Highest Combined Points: **104** (Aberdeen Grammar 57-47 GHA RFC, 12 October 2019)
- Most tries scored: ? (v ?, 00 January 0000
- Most tries conceded: ? (v ?, 00 January 0000

Sequences All stats correct up to 24/10/2021 Longest unbeaten run

- Overall: ? (00 January 0000 to 00 December 0000)
  - Home: ? (00 January 0000 to 00 December 0000)
  - Away: ? (00 January 0000 to 00 December 0000)

Longest losing run

- Overall: **9** (23 August 2003 to 29 October 2010)
  - Home: ? (00 January 0000 to 00 December 0000)
  - Away: ? (00 January 0000 to 00 December 0000)

Longest winless run

- Overall: ? (00 January 0000 to 00 December 0000)
  - Home: ? (00 January 0000 to 00 December 0000)
  - Away: ? (00 January 0000 to 00 December 0000)

Individual Seasons All stats correct up to 24/10/2021

- Most games played in a season: **26** (2005-2006 & 2014–2015 season)
- Most wins in a season: ? (in ? games, 0000–0000 season)
- Most League wins in a Season: **17** (in 22 games, 2014–2015 season), **14** (in 18 games, 2012–2013 season)
- Fewest wins in a season: ? (in ? games, 0000–0000 season)
- Fewest league wins in a season: ? (in ? games, 0000–0000 season)
- Most defeats in a season: ? (in ? games, 0000–0000 season)
- Most league defeats in a season: ? (in ? games, 0000–0000 season)

Opponents and Familiarity All stats correct up to 24/10/2021

- Club played most often: ? v (won ?, drawn ?, lost ?)
- Club played most often in league matches: ? v
- Club played most often in cup matches: **3** v Hillhead / Jordanhill RFC
- Non-home ground GHA have played on most often: ? at
- Player who has played the most games against one opponent for GHA: ? by ? against ?
- Player who has played the most games against GHA: ? by ? for ?

== Junior Rugby ==
GHA has a large junior rugby section consisting of over 400 boys and girls ranging from micros up to Under 18s. The junior section has contributed several players to the senior set up including James Eddie who subsequently signed for Glasgow's professional team, the Glasgow Warriors.

GHA's ongoing ties with Hutchesons' Grammar School and St. Aloysius' College can also be seen from the large number of pupils and former pupils of both schools playing at the club. Links have also been forged with local state schools, particularly Williamwood High School and Mearns Castle High School whose pupils and former pupils are also widely represented throughout the club.

=== The GHA Rugby Academy ===
The GHA Rugby Academy was established in 2012 and is aimed at helping talented young players at the club to realise their potential and achieve their rugby ambitions.

The GHA Rugby Academy offers the club's most talented young players an opportunity to experience a professional approach to training and playing rugby. It was set up to produce future 1st XV players for GHA RFC, provide more players for the Glasgow district set up and ultimately get more players into National Age Grade Squads. It was seen as a necessary development and use of the clubs limited resources in order to develop the long term sustainability of the club and support its long-term ambitions.

== Notable players ==
This is a list of current and former GHA players who have gained full-time professional contracts within a full-time professional rugby squad and/or achieved senior International, International A or International 7s Honours.

This list does not include players who were allocated to play for GHA in the Scottish Rugby draft whereby players from Scotland's full-time professional squads - Glasgow Warriors and Edinburgh Rugby - are annually drafted by Scottish Premiership clubs to play for them on weekends when not selected for the professional teams. During GHA's spell in the Premiership, current Scotland Internationals Johnnie Beattie and John Barclay were among those to be allocated to play for them.

=== Post the 2002 amalgamation ===
- Ben Addison - Scotland 7s
- (Scotland) James Malcolm - Glasgow Warriors, London Scottish
- Rory Hughes - Glasgow Warriors, Scotland 7s, Scotland
- Jon Welsh - Glasgow Warriors, Newcastle Falcons, Scotland
- Zach Mercer - Bath Rugby, England
- Peter Jericevich - Scotland 7s
- Alan Bulloch - Glasgow Warriors, Scotland
- (Scotland) Carlo di Ciacca - Glasgow Caledonians (who later became Glasgow Warriors), Edinburgh Rugby
- James Eddie - Glasgow Warriors, Scotland A, Scotland 7s
- Calum Forrester - Glasgow Warriors, Scotland A, Scotland 7s
- Andrew Henderson - Glasgow Warriors, Scotland
- (Scotland) Andrew Kelly - Glasgow Warriors
- (Scotland) Gareth McClure - Glasgow Warriors, Newcastle Falcons
- (New Zealand) Joe Naufahu - Glasgow Warriors, Southland, Canterbury
- Hefin O'Hare - Glasgow Warriors, Scotland 7s
- (New Zealand) Jamie Pinder - Northland, North Harbour
- (New Zealand) Sam Pinder - Glasgow Warriors, Northland, Scotland
- Andrew Plastow - Queensland Reds, Australia 7s
- (Scotland) Andy Rennick - Border Reivers, Northampton Saints
- (New Zealand) Gavin Walsh - Northampton Saints, Ireland A
- (Australia) Ross West - Queensland Reds
- (New Zealand) Scott Cowan - Southland, Otago Highlanders
- Graham Harkness - Singapore
- John Fitzpatrick - Scotland 7s
- Ross Armour - Hong Kong 7s
- Erik Cavan - Norway
- Milan Marinković - Serbia
- Will Alton - Hungary

=== Pre the 2002 amalgamation ===
- Euan Murray - Scotland, British and Irish Lions
- Richard Allan - Scotland
- (United States) Ray Nelson - USA
- Gordon Bulloch - Scotland, British and Irish Lions
- Gordon McIlwham - Scotland
- Anthony Posa - Croatia

=== Scotland Club Internationalists ===
- Andrew Kelly - 2007
- Jon Welsh - 2008
- Grant Mollison - 2020

=== Scotland U20/U21 Age Grade Internationalists ===
The following players gained either Under 20 or Under 21 Age Grade International honours whilst playing senior rugby at GHA.

Under 21 (Age group was disbanded after 2006 season)

- Euan Murray - 1999, 2000, 2001
- Justin Reid - 2003
- Alasdhair McFarlane - 2005
- John W. Beattie - 2005
- James Eddie - 2005
- Iain Kennedy - 2005, 2006
- Calum Forrester - 2006

Under 20 (Age group replaced Under 21s from 2007 onwards)

- Peter Jericevich - 2008
- James Malcolm - 2013
- Adam Scott - 2021
- Gregor Hiddlestone - 2022
- Andrew Stirrat - 2022
- Jonny Morris - 2023
- Amena Caqusau - 2023

== Club presidents ==
Bernard Dunn || 2002 / 2004

Brian Williams || 2004 / 2005

Bernard Dunn || 2005 / 2007

Alex Millar || 2007 / 2009

Tom Morrice || 2009 / 2011

Bernard Dunn || 2011 / 2013

Ronnie Jamieson || 2013 / 2016

Euan Baillie || 2016 / 2018

Brian Tracey || 2018 / 2020

Stuart Lang || 2020 / 2022

Euan Greer || 2022 / 2024

Gordon Adams || 2024 / 2026

Jonathan Kelly || 2026 / Present

== Club captains ==
Trevor Carmichael	2002 / 2003
Euan Baillie	2003 / 2004
Zander McIlwham	2004 / 2006
Rory Watson	2006 / 2008
Niall Cassie	2008 / 2011
Andrew Henderson	2011 / 2016
Paul Harkins	2016 / 2018
Tony Brogan	2018 / 2020
Michael Fox	2020 / Present

== Head coaches ==
Gavin Walsh	2002 / 2003
David Wilson	2003 / 2005
Roddy Moir	2005 / 2008
Bill MacDonald	2008 / 2011
Gordon MacPherson	2011 / 2014
Craig Sorbie	2014 / 2016
Euan Clark	2016 / 2019
Trevor Carmichael	2019 / 2022
Calum Forrester	2022 / 2026
Jamie McCarthy	2026 / Present

== Braidholm Sevens ==
The club runs the Braidholm Sevens tournament.

== Honours ==
=== Men ===
- Langholm Sevens
  - Champions (1): 2003
- Glasgow City Sevens
  - Champions (1): 2012
- Howe of Fife Sevens
  - Champions (1): 2022
- Cambuslang Sevens
  - Champions (1): 2003
- Hamilton Sevens
  - Champions (1): 2016

=== Women ===
- Mull Sevens
  - Champions (1): 2006
