= Sean Marsden =

Backs Attack and Skills Coach

- Born: Sean Marsden; 18 January 1980 (age 46) Stirling, Scotland
- Height: 1.84 m (6 ft 0 in)
- Weight: 89 kg (196 lb)
- School: Bristol Grammar School
- Occupation: Attack/Backs Coach Bristol Bears

Rugby union career
- Position(s): Wing, Fullback
- Current team: Bristol Bears
Amateur team(s)
Years	Team	Apps	(Points)
1992-1998	Clifton RFC		
Senior career
Years	Team	Apps	(Points)
1998–2002	Bristol	9	(25)
2001–2002	Exeter Chiefs (loan)	10	(10)
2002–2003	Neath RFC	2	(5)
2003–2006	Bristol	49	(152)
2006–2007	Glasgow Warriors	8	(50)
2007–2010	Exeter Chiefs	32	(115)
2010–2012	Bristol		
International career
Years	Team	Apps	(Points)
1995–1996	England U-16		
1997–1999	England U-18		
2000–2001	England U-21		
National sevens teams
Years	Team		Comps
- Scotland
–	England		

Sean Marsden (born 17 January 1980) is a rugby union player who was born in Scotland but has spent most of his life in England, being capped by England at U16 Level, even scoring a hat-trick of tries against the land of his birth.

He was then capped as part of the England under-18's team and played in the U18 Five Nations as it was then, now the U18 Six Nations. At the same time Sean played for Gloucester Rugby's Academy.

A wing or fullback, he was part of the highly successful Bristol U21 team coached by Paul Hull that won the English U21 title 3 times in a row. At the start of the 2007 season he went on trial with the Exeter Chiefs to prove his fitness after an injury hit season with the Scottish regional team, the Glasgow Warriors. He formerly played for Bristol in two spells as well as spells at Exeter and Neath. He attended Bristol Grammar School.

In July 2010, he re-signed for Bristol, before leaving at the end of the 2011–12 season to join the U18 coaching staff at Hartpury College in Gloucester as Academy Head Coach. He stopped playing for Hartpury College R.F.C. in 2015.

Sean guided his team to the prestigious AASE title for several successive years. Working with Ellis Genge, Harry Randall, Jonny Hill at the start of their careers.

In 2019, Marsden coached England U18s. Coaching backs as well as kicking and skills

In June 2016, Sean rejoined Bristol Rugby as part of the coaching team. He was the Skills Coach for Bristol Bears. In 2024, he was promoted to Attack/Backs Coach under Pat Lam.
