= 2005–06 Glasgow Warriors season =

Glasgow Warriors 2005 / 2006
- Ground(s): Hughenden Stadium (Capacity: 6,000); Firhill Stadium (Capacity: 10,887)
- Coach(es): (Scotland) Hugh Campbell to March 2006 (Scotland) Sean Lineen from March 2006
- Captain: (Scotland) Jon Petrie
- Most caps: (Canada) Kevin Tkachuk (25)
- Top scorer: (Scotland) Dan Parks (163)
- Most tries: (Scotland) Rory Lamont (England) Mike Roberts (6)
- League: 2005–06 Celtic League
- 11th

The 2005–06 season is the tenth in the history of the Glasgow Warriors as a professional side. Since the professional side began in 1996 it had used a warrior logo; with a warrior clutching a rugby ball in one hand - and in the other a Scottish targe ordained with a long steel spike originating from its central boss. The warrior is wearing a simple Spangenhelm conical peaked nasal helmet illustrating an early warrior from the Kingdom of Strathclyde.

The warrior logo was formalised into Glasgow's name from this season onwards. The team was now officially known as Glasgow Warriors and formally competed as such.

The 2005–06 season saw Glasgow Warriors compete in the competitions: the Magners Celtic League and the European Champions Cup, the Heineken Cup for sponsorship reasons.

== Season overview ==
- Move to Firhill Stadium
- New Head Coach

== Team ==
=== Coaches ===
- Head coach: (Scotland) Hugh Campbell to March 2006; (Scotland) Sean Lineen from March 2006
- Assistant coach: (Scotland) Shade Munro
- Assistant coach: (Scotland) Sean Lineen to March 2006.
- Assistant coach: (New Zealand) Gary Mercer from June 2005.
- Strength and Fitness Coach: (England) Mark Bitcon
- Academy coach: (Scotland) Stephen Gemmell

=== Staff ===
Media Manager: Sarah Niblock
Marketing Manager: Fraser Bedwell
Team Facilitators: Dougie Mills, Kim Gray
Sales & Promotions Executive: Colin Marr
Business Manager: Diane Murphy
Team Doctor: Gerry Haggerty
Physiotherapists: Bob Stewart, Lisa Casey

=== Squad ===
Hookers (Scotland) Eric Milligan (Scotland) Scott Lawson (Scotland) Fergus Thomson Props (Australia) Lloyd Campbell-McBride (Scotland) Lee Harrison (Scotland) Andrew Kelly (Scotland) Euan Murray (Scotland) Ben Prescott (Canada) Kevin Tkachuk Locks (Ireland) Tim Barker (Scotland) Craig Hamilton (Scotland) Gregor Hayter (Scotland) Dan Turner	Loose forwards (Scotland) Johnnie Beattie (Scotland) Paul Dearlove (Scotland) Donnie Macfadyen (Scotland) Jon Petrie (Scotland) Steve Swindall (Scotland) Andrew Wilson Half backs (Scotland) Graeme Beveridge (Scotland) Graham Calder (Scotland) Calum Cusiter (Scotland) Alasdhair McFarlane (Scotland) Sam Pinder Stand offs (Scotland) Calvin Howarth (Scotland) Dan Parks	Centres (England) Scott Barrow (Scotland) Ben Cairns (Scotland) Andy Craig (England) Spencer Davey (Scotland) Andrew Henderson (Scotland) Graeme Morrison Back Three (Scotland) Ben Addison (Scotland) Rory Lamont (Scotland) Hefin O'Hare (Scotland) Steven Manning (New Zealand) Eddie McLaughlin (England) Mike Roberts (Scotland) Colin Shaw (Australia) Graydon Staniforth (Ireland) Gavin Dodd

==== Academy players ====
- (Scotland) Stuart Corsar - Prop
- (Scotland) James Eddie - Flanker
- (Scotland) John Barclay - Flanker
- (Scotland) Scott Forrest - Number Eight
- (Scotland) Iain Kennedy - Fly-half
- (Scotland) Colin Gregor - Fly-half

== Player statistics ==
During the 2005–06 season, Glasgow have used 38 different players in competitive games. The table below shows the number of appearances and points scored by each player.

Position	Nation	Name	Celtic League			Champions Cup			Total	
Position	Nation	Name	Apps (sub)	Tries	Points kicked	Apps (sub)	Tries	Points kicked	Apps (sub)	Total pts
HK	(Scotland)	Eric Milligan	(1)	0	0	0	0	0	(1)	0
HK	(Scotland)	Scott Lawson	15(3)	1	0	5(1)	0	0	20(4)	5
HK	(Scotland)	Fergus Thomson	5(14)	0	0	1(4)	0	0	6(18)	0
PR	(Scotland)	Stuart Corsar	1(5)	1	0	(2)	0	0	1(7)	5
PR	(Scotland)	Lee Harrison	7(8)	0	0	2(4)	0	0	9(12)	0
PR	(Scotland)	Euan Murray	13(1)	0	0	4	0	0	17(1)	0
PR	(Scotland)	Ben Prescott	2(2)	0	0	0	0	0	2(2)	0
PR	(Canada)	Kevin Tkachuk	17(2)	2	0	6	2	0	23(2)	20
LK	(Ireland)	Tim Barker	10	0	0	4(1)	0	0	14(1)	0
LK	(Scotland)	Craig Hamilton	11(6)	2	0	4(2)	0	0	15(8)	10
LK	(Scotland)	Gregor Hayter	4(8)	1	0	1(5)	0	0	5(13)	5
LK	(Scotland)	Dan Turner	14(4)	1	0	3(3)	1	0	17(7)	10
BR	(Scotland)	John Barclay	7(5)	0	0	6	1	0	13(5)	5
BR	(Scotland)	Johnnie Beattie	10(4)	2	0	4	0	0	14(2)	10
BR	(Scotland)	Paul Dearlove	5(2)	0	0	2	0	0	7(2)	0
BR	(Scotland)	James Eddie	4(4)	0	0	0	0	0	4(4)	0
BR	(Scotland)	Donnie Macfadyen	6(1)	0	0	0	0	0	6(1)	0
BR	(Scotland)	Jon Petrie	12	1	0	2	0	0	14	5
BR	(Scotland)	Steve Swindall	10(3)	2	0	4(1)	0	0	14(4)	10
BR	(Scotland)	Andrew Wilson	7(2)	1	0	0	0	0	7(2)	5
SH	(Scotland)	Graeme Beveridge	5(6)	0	0	6	0	0	11(6)	0
SH	(Scotland)	Sam Pinder	13(5)	4	0	(6)	0	0	13(11)	20
FH	(Scotland)	Colin Gregor	8(3)	3	56	1(4)	0	24	9(7)	95
FH	(Scotland)	Calvin Howarth	3(5)	1	3	0	0	0	3(5)	8
FH	(Scotland)	Iain Kennedy	(1)	0	0	0	0	0	(1)	0
FH	(Scotland)	Dan Parks	14(2)	1	125	5(1)	1	28	19(3)	163
CE	(Scotland)	Scott Barrow	6(1)	0	0	(1)	0	0	6(2)	0
CE	(Scotland)	Andy Craig	7(2)	1	0	2(1)	1	0	9(3)	10
CE	(England)	Spencer Davey	6(1)	0	0	0	0	0	6(1)	0
CE	(Scotland)	Andrew Henderson	10(1)	1	0	6	1	0	16(1)	10
CE	(Scotland)	Graeme Morrison	8(7)	2	0	5(1)	3	0	13(8)	25
WG	(Scotland)	Rory Lamont	18	4	0	4	2	0	22	30
WG	(Scotland)	Hefin O'Hare	14(3)	1	0	6	0	0	20(3)	5
WG	(New Zealand)	Eddie McLaughlin	(1)	0	0	0	0	0	(1)	0
WG	(England)	Mike Roberts	11(1)	3	0	1(1)	3	0	12(2)	30
WG	(Scotland)	Colin Shaw	7	1	0	2	0	0	9	5
FB	(Australia)	Graydon Staniforth	10(3)	3	0	4(1)	0	0	14(4)	15

== Staff movements ==
=== Coaches ===
==== Promotions ====
(Scotland) Sean Lineen to Head Coach

==== Personnel in ====
(New Zealand) Gary Mercer from (England) Castleford Tigers Rugby League

==== Personnel out ====
(Scotland) Hugh Campbell

== Player movements ==
=== Player transfers ===
==== In ====
- (Scotland) Graham Calder from (Scotland) Currie
- (Scotland) Steven Manning from (Scotland) Ayr
- (Scotland) Calum Cusiter from (Scotland) Boroughmuir
- (Scotland) Ben Addison from (Scotland) Stirling County
- (Ireland) Gavin Dodd from (England) Oldham R.L.F.C. (RL)
- (Scotland) Ben Cairns from (Scotland) Edinburgh (loan)

==== Out ====
- (Scotland) Graham Calder to (Scotland) Currie
- (Scotland) Steven Manning to (Scotland) Ayr
- (Scotland) Calum Cusiter to (Scotland) Boroughmuir
- (Scotland) Ben Addison to (Scotland) Stirling County
- (Ireland) Gavin Dodd to (England) Widnes Vikings (RL)
- (Scotland) Steven Duffy to (Scotland) Glasgow Hawks
- (Scotland) Ben Cairns to (Scotland) Edinburgh (loan ends)

== Competitions ==
=== Pre-season and friendlies ===
==== Match 1 ====
15 August 2005
7pm

(Scotland) Ayr	10-40	(Scotland) Glasgow Warriors
Try: Eddie McLaughlin ?	Report; Report

Millbrae

Ayr:
Replacements:

Glasgow Warriors: Stuart Corsar, Fergus Thomson, Ben Prescott, Tim Barker, Dan Turner, Paul Dearlove, Andy Wilson, Jon Petrie, Sam Pinder, Scott Barrow, Ben Addison, Iain Kennedy, Andy Craig, Rory Lamont, Graydon Staniforth
Replacements: Scott Lawson, Steve Swindall, Dan Parks, Graham Calder, Mike Roberts, Gregor Hayter, Craig Hamilton, Colin Shaw,
Andrew Henderson, Lee Harrison, John Barclay

==== Match 2 ====
20 August 2005
2.30pm

(Scotland) Glasgow Warriors	55 - 7	(England) Rotherham Titans
Try: Kevin Tkachuk; Rory Lamont; Andrew Henderson x 2 Andy Craig; Graeme Beveridge; Fergus Thomson; Con: Dan Parks x 4 Calvin Howarth x 3 Pen: Dan Parks x 2	Preview; Report; Report	Try: Neil Cochrane; Con: Mike Whitehead

Hughenden Stadium
Referee: Graham Hannah (Kirkcaldy)

Glasgow Warriors: Kevin Tkachuk, Scott Lawson, Lee Harrison, Craig Hamilton, Steve Swindall, Andy Wilson, Jon Petrie (captain)
Graeme Beveridge, Dan Parks, Mike Roberts, Andrew Henderson, Andy Craig, Rory Lamont, Colin Shaw
Replacements: (all used) Fergus Thomson, Paul Dearlove, Dan Turner, Colin Gregor, Eddie McLaughlin, Gregor Hayter, John Barclay,
Alasdhair MacFarlane, Graydon Staniforth, Stuart Corsar, Calvin Howarth

Rotherham Titans:Anthony Carter; David Strettle, Lee Blackett (captain), Tom Allen, Errie Classens; Mike Whitehead, Joe Bedford; Attie Pienaar, Neil Hannah, Jarleth Carey, Rob Walton, Nathan Pike, Hendre Fourie, Scott Donald, Neil Cochrane
Replacements: Morne Jonker, Lodewyk Strauss, N D Monye, Jon Golding, Adam Hopcroft, Lewi McGowan, Ben Wade

==== Match 3 ====
22 August 2005
6pm

(Scotland) Glasgow Warriors	7 - 24	(Scotland) Edinburgh Gunners
Try: Rory Lamont; Con: ?	Report; Report	Try: Ben Cairns; Grant Anderson; Dave Hewett; Con: Duncan Hodge x 3 Pen: Duncan Hodge

Whitecraigs

Glasgow Warriors: Stuart Corsar, Fergus Thomson, Lee Harrison, James Eddie, Dan Turner, Gregor Hayter, John Barclay, Paul Dearlove, Alasdhair MacFarlane, Calvin Howarth, Rory Lamont, Scott Barrow, Iain Kennedy, Eddie McLaughlin, Graydon Staniforth
Replacements: Scott Lawson, Tim Barker, Andy Wilson, Colin Gregor, Eric Milligan, Calum Cusiter, Kevin Tkachuk, Jon Petrie, Stephen Manning, Ben Addison, Stephen Duffy

Edinburgh Gunners: Ben Cairns, Andrew Easson, Peter Jorgensen, Matt Dey, Michael Pyke, Duncan Hodge, Rory Lawson, Grant Anderson, Andrew Kelly, Allan Jacobsen, Fergus Pringle, Scott Murray, captain, Simon Cross, Allan Macdonald, Ally Strokosch.
Replacements: Nick De Luca, Simon Webster, Ander Monro, Jamie Blackwood, Craig Smith, Steven Lawrie, Dave Hewett, Ally Dickinson, Steven Turnbull, Matt Mustchin, Apolosi Satala

==== Match 4 ====
27 August 2005
5.30pm

(England) Newcastle Falcons	32 - 11	(Scotland) Glasgow Warriors
Try: Tom May; Jamie Noon; Phil Dowson; Matt Burke; Anthony Elliott; Con: Dave Walder x 2 Pen: Dave Walder	Preview; Report; Report	Try: Graeme Beveridge; Pen: Dan Parks x 2

Kingston Park
Attendance: 3000
Referee: D. Pearson (RFU)

Newcastle Falcons: M Burke; T May, J Noon, M Mayerhofler, A Elliott; D Walder, H Charlton
I Peel, A Long, T Paoletti, A Perry, G Parling, P Dowson, C Harris, C Charvis
Replacements: (all used) M Ward, R Morris, M Thompson, M Wilkinson, J Grindal, S Grimes, L Gross
E Williamson, M Tait, J Hoyle, T Flood, M McCarthy, B Woods

Glasgow Warriors: Kevin Tkachuk, Scott Lawson, Lee Harrison, Gregor Hayter, Craig Hamilton, Paul Dearlove, Andy Wilson, Jon Petrie,
Sam Pinder, Dan Parks, Mike Roberts, Andrew Henderson, Andy Craig, Rory Lamont, Colin Shaw
Replacements: Fergus Thomson, Tim Barker, John Barclay, Graeme Beveridge, Calvin Howarth, Scott Barrow, Eddie McLaughlin,
Graydon Staniforth, Stuart Corsar, Dan Turner

==== Match 5 ====
21 November 2005
6pm

(England) Newcastle Falcons Academy	5 - 50	(Scotland) Glasgow Warriors
Try: Greg Irvin	Report; Report	Try: Graeme Morrison; Fergus Thomson x 2 Graeme Beveridge; Dan Turner; Sam Pinder; Lee Harrison; Steven Duffy

Percy Park

Newcastle Falcons Academy: Andrew Skeen, Cameron Johnston, Mark Laycock, Mark Wilkinson, Gareth Kerr, Joe Shaw, Lee Dickson,
Grant Anderson, Matt Thompson, David Wilson, Ben Marshall, Andy Buist, Eni Gesinde, Jamie Rennie, Greg Irvin
Replacements: Ross Batty, Danny Brown, Jonny Williams, Stuart Mackie, Phil Dawson, Phil Ludford, Tom Jokelson, Gavin Beasley,
James Shiel

Glasgow Warriors: Stuart Corsar, Fergus Thomson, Lee Harrison, Tim Barker, Dan Turner, Steve Swindall, Gregor Hayter, Paul Dearlove,
Graeme Beveridge, Colin Gregor, Colin Shaw, Scott Barrow, Graeme Morrison, Hefin O'Hare, Graydon Staniforth
Replacements: Eric Milligan, Scott Forrest, Sam Pinder, Steven Duffy, Gavin Dodd

=== European Champions Cup ===
==== Pool 5 ====
Team	P	W	D	L	Tries for	Tries against	Try diff	Points for	Points against	Points diff	TB	LB	Pts
(England) Bath (6)	6	5	0	1	18	9	9	166	111	55	3	0	23
(Ireland) Leinster (8)	6	4	0	2	28	13	15	214	124	90	4	2	22
(France) Bourgoin	6	2	0	4	9	24	−15	109	195	−86	1	0	9
(Scotland) Glasgow Warriors	6	1	0	5	16	25	−9	131	190	−59	1	1	6

==== Results ====
===== Round 1 =====
21 October 2005
20:30

Bourgoin (France)	16 – 3	(Scotland) Glasgow Warriors
Try: David Janin; Con: Benjamin Boyet; Pen: Benjamin Boyet x 2 Nicolas Carmona	Preview; Report; Report; Report	Pen: Dan Parks

Stade Pierre Rajon
Attendance: 7,000
Referee: Dave Pearson (England)

===== Round 2 =====
30 October 2005
15:00

Glasgow Warriors (Scotland)	20 – 33	(Ireland) Leinster
Try: Graeme Morrison x 2 Andrew Henderson; Con: Colin Gregor; Pen: Dan Parks	Preview; Preview; Report; Report; Report	Try: Kieran Lewis; Ciaran Potts; Felipe Contepomi; Gordon D'Arcy; Con: Felipe Contepomi x 2 Pen: Felipe Contepomi x 3

Hughenden Stadium
Attendance: 1,907
Referee: Chris White (England)

===== Round 3 =====
10 December 2005
14:15

Bath (England)	31 – 26	(Scotland) Glasgow Warriors
Try: Frikkie Welsh; Michael Stephenson; Michael Lipman; Salesi Finau; Con: Olly Barkley; Pen: Olly Barkley x 3	Preview; Report; Report; Report	Try: Andrew Henderson; Dan Parks; Con: Dan Parks x 2 Pen: Dan Parks x 3 Colin Gregor

The Recreation Ground
Attendance: 10,200
Referee: Christophe Berdos (France)

===== Round 4 =====
16 December 2005
19:30

Glasgow Warriors (Scotland)	10 – 29	(England) Bath
Try: Kevin Tkachuk; Con: Dan Parks; Pen: Dan Parks	Preview; Report; Report; Report	Try: Michael Stephenson; Nick Walshe; Danny Grewcock; Tom Cheeseman; Con: Olly Barkley x 3 Pen: Olly Barkley

Firhill Stadium
Attendance: 1,759
Referee: George Clancy (Ireland)

===== Round 5 =====
14 January 2006
17:15

Leinster (Ireland)	46 – 22	(Scotland) Glasgow Warriors
Try: Girvan Dempsey; Shane Horgan; Brian O'Driscoll x 2 Denis Hickie; Felipe Contepomi; Cameron Jowitt x 2 Con: Felipe Contepomi x 3	Preview; Report; Report; Report	Try: Rory Lamont; Con: Dan Parks; Pen: Dan Parks

RDS
Attendance: 12,443
Referee: Joel Jutge (France)

===== Round 6 =====
22 January 2006
15:00

Glasgow Warriors (Scotland)	50 – 35	(France) Bourgoin
Try: Rory Lamont; Andy Craig; Mike Roberts x 2 Kevin Tkachuk; Dan Turner; Graeme Morrison; Con: Colin Gregor x 6 Pen: Colin Gregor	Preview; Report; Report; Report	Try: Anthony Forest x 2 Pascal Papé; Wessel Jooste; Con: Benjamin Boyet x 2 Alexandre Peclier; Pen: Benjamin Boyet

Firhill Stadium
Attendance: 1,038
Referee: Tim Hayes (Wales)

=== Magners Celtic League ===
Teams played 20 matches each but were deemed as playing 22 with 8 pts added to their score.

==== League table ====
	Team	Pld	W	D	L	PF	PA	PD	TF	TA	Try bonus	Losing bonus	Pts
1	(Ireland) Ulster	22	15	1	4	510	347	+163	49	31	3	2	75
2	(Ireland) Leinster	22	14	0	6	545	427	+118	59	45	8	2	74
3	(Ireland) Munster	22	12	0	8	439	372	+67	49	42	7	3	66
4	(Wales) Cardiff Blues	22	11	0	9	475	389	+86	51	38	6	5	63
5	(Scotland) Edinburgh Gunners	22	11	0	9	418	415	+3	48	45	5	3	60
6	(Wales) Llanelli Scarlets	22	10	1	9	418	402	+16	49	37	3	4	57
7	(Wales) Ospreys	22	11	0	9	381	409	−28	33	38	1	2	55
8	(Wales) Newport Gwent Dragons	22	7	0	13	355	456	−101	40	51	2	7	45
9	(Scotland) Border Reivers	22	7	0	13	386	501	−115	39	59	1	7	44
10	(Ireland) Connacht	22	6	0	14	325	466	−141	28	51	1	4	37
11	(Scotland) Glasgow Warriors	22	5	0	15	371	439	−68	39	47	2	7	37
Under the standard bonus point system, points are awarded as follows: 4 points for a win; 2 points for a draw; 1 bonus point for scoring 4 tries (or more) (Try bonus); 1 bonus point for losing by 7 points (or fewer) (Losing bonus)
Due to the uneven number of participating teams, each team had two free weekends and were awarded 4 match points each time.
Source: RaboDirect PRO12

==== Results ====
===== Round 1 =====
2 September 2005
19:30

Glasgow Warriors (Scotland)	15 – 21	(Wales) Newport Gwent Dragons
Try: Mike Roberts; Steve Swindall; Con: Dan Parks; Pen: Dan Parks	Preview; Report; Report; Report	Try: Gareth Wyatt; Jason Forster x 2 Con: Craig Warlow x 3

Hughenden Stadium
Attendance: 2,034
Referee: George Clancy

===== Round 2 =====
10 September 2005
17:00

Leinster (Ireland)	26 – 21	(Scotland) Glasgow Warriors
Try: Kieran Lewis; Rob Kearney; Con: Felipe Contepomi x 2 Pen: Felipe Contepomi x 4	Preview; Report; Report; Report	Try: Craig Hamilton; Rory Lamont; Con: Dan Parks; Pen: Dan Parks x 2 Drop: Dan Parks

Donnybrook Stadium
Attendance: 3,700
Referee: Phil Fear

===== Round 3 =====
17 September 2005
19:30

Glasgow Warriors (Scotland)	32 – 10	(Ireland) Munster
Try: Mike Roberts; Andrew Wilson; Steve Swindall; Rory Lamont; Con: Dan Parks x 3 Pen: Dan Parks x 2	Preview; Report; Report; Report	Try: penalty try Con: Ronan O'Gara; Pen: Paul Burke

Hughenden Stadium
Attendance: 1,884
Referee: Nigel Owens (Wales)

===== Round 4 =====
24 September 2005
19:30

Glasgow Warriors (Scotland)	23 – 28	(Wales) Cardiff Blues
Try: Calvin Howarth; Mike Roberts; Rory Lamont; Con: Dan Parks; Pen: Calvin Howarth; Dan Parks	Preview; Report; Report; Report	Try: Craig Morgan; Maama Molitika x 2 Nicky Robinson; Con: Nicky Robinson x 3 Lee Thomas

Hughenden Stadium
Attendance: 1,404
Referee: Donal Courtney (Ireland)

===== Round 5 =====
30 September 2005
19:30

Edinburgh Gunners (Scotland)	28 – 12	(Scotland) Glasgow Warriors
Try: Scott Murray; Rory Lawson; Rob Dewey; Con: Chris Paterson x 2 Pen: Chris Paterson x 2 Drop: Chris Paterson	Preview; Report; Report; Report	Try: Andy Craig; Scott Lawson; Con: Dan Parks

Murrayfield Stadium
Attendance: 2,502
Referee: Simon McDowell

===== Round 6 =====
Glasgow Warriors sat out this round.

===== Round 7 =====
16 October 2005
16:10

Llanelli Scarlets (Wales)	24 – 20	(Scotland) Glasgow Warriors
Try: Hottie Louw; Liam Davies; Con: Gareth Bowen; Pen: Gareth Bowen x 4	Preview; Report; Report; Report	Try: Gregor Hayter; Pen: Dan Parks x 5

Stradey Park
Attendance: 6,333
Referee: Donal Courtney

===== Round 8 =====
4 November 2005
19:30

Glasgow Warriors (Scotland)	30 – 15	(Ireland) Connacht
Try: Colin Gregor; Dan Turner; Graydon Staniforth; Con: Colin Gregor x 3 Pen: Colin Gregor x 3	Preview; Report; Report; Report	Try: Andrew Farley; Conor McPhillips; Con: Paul Warwick; Pen: Paul Warwick

Hughenden Stadium
Attendance: 1,518
Referee: Tim Hayes

===== Round 9 =====
4 December 2005
15:00

Glasgow Warriors (Scotland)	46 – 6	(Scotland) Edinburgh Gunners
Try: Kevin Tkachuk; Graeme Morrison; Colin Gregor; Johnnie Beattie; Graydon Staniforth; Con: Dan Parks; Colin Gregor x 4 Pen: Colin Gregor x 2	Preview; Report; Report; Report	Pen: Duncan Hodge x 2

Firhill Stadium
Attendance: 2,003
Referee: Alan Lewis

===== Round 10 =====
Glasgow Warriors sat out this round.

===== Round 11 =====
31 December 2005
14:00

Border Reivers (Scotland)	24 – 13	(Scotland) Glasgow Warriors
Try: Steve Scott; Simon Danielli; Con: Charlie Hore; Pen: Charlie Hore x 4	Preview; Report; Report; Report	Try: Rory Lamont; Con: Dan Parks; Pen: Dan Parks x 2

Netherdale
Attendance: 2,107
Referee: Peter Allan

===== Round 12 =====
7 January 2006
15:30

Ulster (Ireland)	25 – 23	(Scotland) Glasgow Warriors
Try: David Humphreys; Con: David Humphreys; Pen: David Humphreys x 6	Preview; Report; Report; Report	Try: Craig Hamilton; Graeme Morrison; Con: Dan Parks x 2 Pen: Dan Parks x 3

Ravenhill
Attendance: 6,487
Referee: Phil Fear

===== Round 13 =====
27 January 2006
19:30

Glasgow Warriors (Scotland)	8 – 22	(Wales) Ospreys
Try: Kevin Tkachuk; Con: Colin Gregor	Preview; Report; Report; Report	Try: Adrian Cashmore; Con: Adrian Cashmore; Pen: Adrian Cashmore; Shaun Connor x 3 Drop: Shaun Connor

Old Anniesland
Attendance: 1,335
Referee: Donal Courtney

===== Round 14 =====
18 February 2006
15:30

Munster (Ireland)	20 – 26	(Scotland) Glasgow Warriors
Try: Anthony Foley; Anthony Horgan; Stephen Keogh; Con: Mossie Lawlor; Pen: Mossie Lawlor	Preview; Report; Report; Report	Try: Sam Pinder; Colin Gregor; Con: Colin Gregor x 2 Pen: Colin Gregor x 4

Thomond Park
Attendance: 5,000
Referee: Nigel Owens

===== Round 15 =====
3 March 2006
19:30

Glasgow Warriors (Scotland)	8 – 20	(Scotland) Border Reivers
Try: Sam Pinder; Pen: Colin Gregor	Preview; Report; Report; Report	Try: Simon Danielli; Andy Miller; Con: Calum MacRae x 2 Pen: Calum MacRae x 2

Firhill Stadium
Attendance: 1,406
Referee: Rob Dickson

===== Round 16 =====
24 March 2006
19:10

Cardiff Blues (Wales)	31 – 3	(Scotland) Glasgow Warriors
Try: Andy Powell; Martyn Williams; Nicky Robinson; Mike Phillips; Chris Czekaj; Con: Nicky Robinson x 3	Preview; Report; Report; Report	Pen: Dan Parks

Cardiff Arms Park
Attendance: 4,508
Referee: Donal Courtney

===== Round 17 =====
8 April 2006
17:30

Ospreys (Wales)	16 – 13	(Scotland) Glasgow Warriors
Try: Richard Mustoe; Steve Tandy; Pen: Shaun Connor; Gavin Henson	Preview; Report; Report; Report	Try: Sam Pinder; Con: Dan Parks; Pen: Dan Parks x 2

Liberty Stadium
Attendance: 4,000
Referee: Alain Rolland

===== Round 18 =====
15 April 2006
17:30

Glasgow Warriors (Scotland)	18 – 27	(Ireland) Ulster
Try: Johnnie Beattie; Hefin O'Hare; Con: Dan Parks; Pen: Dan Parks	Preview; Report; Report; Report	Try: Justin Harrison; Isaac Boss; Con: David Humphreys; Pen: David Humphreys x 5

Firhill Stadium
Attendance: 2,240
Referee: Tim Hayes

===== Round 19 =====
28 April 2006
19:10

Newport Gwent Dragons (Wales)	32 – 18	(Scotland) Glasgow Warriors
Try: Adam Black; Jason Forster x 2 Nathan Brew; Con: Craig Warlow x 3 Pen: Craig Warlow x 2	Preview; Report; Report; Report	Try: Dan Parks; Colin Shaw; Con: Dan Parks; Pen: Dan Parks x 2

Rodney Parade
Attendance: 3,850
Referee: David Keane

===== Round 20 =====
7 May 2006
19:30

Glasgow Warriors (Scotland)	18 – 21	(Ireland) Leinster
Try: Andrew Henderson; Stuart Corsar; Con: Dan Parks; Pen: Dan Parks x 2	Preview; Report; Report; Report	Try: Keith Gleeson; Rob Kearney; Con: Felipe Contepomi; Pen: Felipe Contepomi x 3

Firhill Stadium
Attendance: 1,129
Referee: Hugh Watkins

===== Round 21 =====
12 May 2006
19:10

Glasgow Warriors (Scotland)	17 – 10	(Wales) Llanelli Scarlets
Try: Jon Petrie; Pen: Dan Parks x 4	Preview; Report; Report; Report	Try: Aled Gravelle; Con: Craig Evans; Pen: Craig Evans

Firhill Stadium
Attendance: 1,014
Referee: George Clancy

===== Round 22 =====
26 May 2006
18:30

Connacht (Ireland)	33 – 7	(Scotland) Glasgow Warriors
Try: John Fogarty; David Slemen; Chris Keane; Matt Lacey; Dave Gannon; Con: Mark McHugh x 4	Preview; Report; Report; Report	Try: Sam Pinder; Con: Colin Gregor

Sportsground
Attendance: 1,100
Referee: Nigel Owens

== Competitive debuts this season ==
A player's nationality shown is taken from the nationality at the highest honour for the national side obtained; or if never capped internationally their place of birth. Senior caps take precedence over junior caps or place of birth; junior caps take precedence over place of birth. A player's nationality at debut may be different from the nationality shown. Combination sides like the British and Irish Lions or Pacific Islanders are not national sides, or nationalities.

Players in BOLD font have been capped by their senior international XV side as nationality shown.

Players in Italic font have capped either by their international 7s side; or by the international XV 'A' side as nationality shown.

Players in normal font have not been capped at senior level.

A position in parentheses indicates that the player debuted as a substitute. A player may have made a prior debut for Glasgow Warriors in a non-competitive match, 'A' match or 7s match; these matches are not listed.

Tournaments where competitive debut made:

**Scottish Inter-District Championship**	**Welsh–Scottish League**	**WRU Challenge Cup**	**Celtic League**	**Celtic Cup**	**1872 Cup**	**Pro12**	**Pro14**	**Rainbow Cup**	**United Rugby Championship**	**European Challenge Cup**	**Heineken Cup / European Champions Cup**

Crosshatching indicates a jointly hosted match.

Number	Player nationality	Name	Position	Date of debut	Venue	Stadium	Opposition nationality	Opposition side	Tournament	Match result	Scoring debut
137	(Scotland)	Craig Hamilton	Lock	2005-09-02	Home	Hughenden Stadium	(Wales)	Dragons	Celtic League	Loss	Nil
138	(England)	Mike Roberts	Wing	2005-09-02	Home	Hughenden Stadium	(Wales)	Dragons	Celtic League	Loss	5 pts
139	(Scotland)	Stuart Corsar	(Prop)	2005-09-02	Home	Hughenden Stadium	(Wales)	Dragons	Celtic League	Loss	Nil
140	(England)	Gregor Hayter	(Lock)	2005-09-02	Home	Hughenden Stadium	(Wales)	Dragons	Celtic League	Loss	Nil
141	(Ireland)	Tim Barker	Lock	2005-09-10	Away	Donnybrook Stadium	(Ireland)	Leinster	Celtic League	Loss	Nil
142	(Australia)	Graydon Staniforth	(Wing)	2005-09-17	Home	Hughenden Stadium	(Ireland)	Munster	Celtic League	Win	Nil
143	(Scotland)	Hefin O'Hare	(Wing)	2005-09-24	Home	Hughenden Stadium	(Wales)	Cardiff Blues	Celtic League	Loss	Nil
144	(New Zealand)	Eddie McLaughlin	(Wing)	2005-11-04	Home	Hughenden Stadium	(Ireland)	Connacht	Celtic League	Loss	Nil
145	(Scotland)	**Ben Cairns**	(Centre)	2006-01-27	Home	Old Anniesland	(Wales)	Ospreys	Celtic League	Loss	Nil
146	(England)	Spencer Davey	Centre	2006-02-18	Away	Thomond Park	(Ireland)	Munster	Celtic League	Win	Nil
147	(Scotland)	James Eddie	(Flanker)	2006-02-18	Away	Thomond Park	(Ireland)	Munster	Celtic League	Win	Nil
148	(Scotland)	Iain Kennedy	(Full back)	2006-05-26	Away	Galway Sportsgrounds	(Ireland)	Connacht	Celtic League	Loss	Nil

== Sponsorship ==
=== Main sponsor ===
- Highland Spring

=== Official kit supplier ===
KooGa

=== Clud sponsors ===
- Maclay Murray & Spens
- Visit Scotland

=== Partners ===
- McCrea Financial Services
- The Glasgow Club
