= Graham Calder =

Scottish rugby union player

- Born: Graham Calder c. 1981 Scotland
- School: Dalziel High School

Rugby union career
- Position: Scrum-Half
Amateur team(s)
Years	Team	Apps	(Points)
1998-2002	Dalziel	66	(271)
2002-2003	Heriots		
2003-2004	Peebles		
2004-2007	Currie		
2007-2010	Stirling County		
2010-present	Dalziel	38	(11)
- Correct as of 3 April 2019
Senior career
Years	Team	Apps	(Points)
2005-06	Glasgow Warriors		

Graham Calder is a Scottish rugby union player, formerly of Glasgow Warriors at professional level and Heriots, Peebles, Currie, and Stirling County and currently at Dalziel. Calder plays at Scrum-Half but can also cover at Fly-Half. Calder now teaches physical education at Dalziel High School.

== Career ==
=== Amateur rugby ===
Calder started his rugby career at Dalziel RFC before moving to Heriots, Peebles, Currie, and Stirling County.

He was part of the Glasgow Thistles squad in season 1999-2000. The Thistles were used as an academy side by Glasgow Warriors and sent to New Zealand for rugby training.

=== Professional rugby ===
In season 2005-06, Calder joined Glasgow Warriors on a trial.

A knee injury in the first game of the season to Sam Pinder against Ayr RFC meant that Calder was called upon almost immediately. Coach Hugh Campbell said "He fitted in very well considering he had met up with the team only tonight."

Although Glasgow Warriors won the match 40 - 10 and his performance was praised, it was Calder's only appearance for the Warriors.

=== Festival of Youth Rugby ===
Calder runs the annual Festival of Youth Rugby in Dalziel. The festival showcases youth rugby in Scotland, although youth teams from Northern Ireland and England also take part as guest touring teams. The tournament annually attracts around a thousand boys and girls.

The festival was started in 1991 by Calder's father Alan Calder, who had previously been club captain and president. The Alan Calder trophy is handed out to the Under 18 winners.

The festival celebrated its silver anniversary in 2015. Since 2016 the Festival of Youth Rugby plays its matches on all-weather parks.

Former Dalziel and Glasgow Warriors players, including Gary Strain, have attended the event.
