= Lloyd Campbell =

Lloyd Campbell may refer to:

- Lloyd Campbell (general)
- Lloyd Campbell (politician)
- Lloyd Campbell (curler)

== See also ==
- Lloyd Campbell-McBride, rugby union player
