= Eddie McLaughlin =

New Zealand rugby player

- Born: Eddie McLaughlin; 11 April 1980 (age 46) New Zealand
- Height: 1.67 m (5 ft 6 in)
- Weight: 84 kg (13 st 3 lb)

Rugby union career
- Position: Wing
Amateur team(s)
Years	Team	Apps	(Points)
- Tuggeranong Vikings
- Canberra Vikings
2005-06	Ayr		
Senior career
Years	Team	Apps	(Points)
2005-06	Glasgow Warriors	1	(0)
Provincial / State sides
Years	Team	Apps	(Points)
- Bay of Plenty
Super Rugby
Years	Team	Apps	(Points)
- Brumbies

Eddie McLaughlin (born 11 April 1980 in New Zealand) is a former rugby union player who played on the wing for Glasgow Warriors.

He is Scottish qualified as his paternal grandparents are from Greenock. His father and two uncles have represented New Zealand at football. McLaughlin played football until 15 when he switched to rugby union.

Although small in stature McLaughlin could run 100 metres in 10.6 seconds and bench press 150 kg.

McLaughlin came from the Bay of Plenty to play for the Tuggeranong Vikings. McLaughlin previously played for Canberra Vikings and for super rugby side Brumbies.

He signed to Glasgow Warriors in 2005 on a three-month contract. He was signed by head coach Hugh Campbell who stated: "We're delighted to welcome a player of Eddie's calibre to Hughenden. His try scoring record for his previous clubs speaks for itself and we hope that he'll be able to continue that form while on trial with us here at Glasgow."

McLaughlin stated that on signing: "Playing in Scotland is something that I've always wanted to do. My family is from there and it was an opportunity that was too good for me to pass up. Ultimately my goal is to perform well for the Celtic League Cup and earn a place in the squad for the Heineken Cup."

When not involved with the Warriors, McLaughlin played for Ayr. He played once for the Warriors in the Pro12; coming on as a substitute in the Warriors match against Connacht on 4 November 2005.

He was released by Warriors at the end of the season.

Eddie was sent to jail after being found guilty of drug possession.
