= North Lanarkshire Heritage Centre =

Scottish heritage centre

Coordinates: 55°47′26″N 3°59′43″W

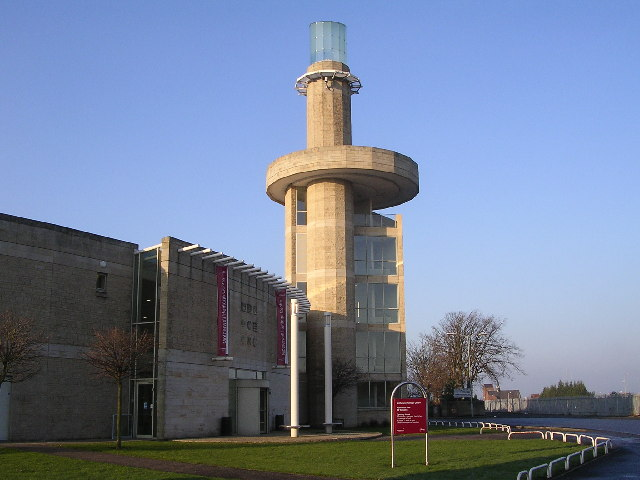
North Lanarkshire Heritage Centre

The North Lanarkshire Heritage Centre is a four star heritage centre located near the town centre of Motherwell, North Lanarkshire, Scotland. The centre is seen as the main repository for archives and modern records for the whole of North Lanarkshire.

== History ==
Originally known as Motherwell Heritage Centre, the centre was opened in 1996, and was known as that until April 2012, when all archive and modern records were transferred to Motherwell from its previous location in Cumbernauld. As of April 2013 ownership was transferred from North Lanarkshire Council to CultureNL.

== Features ==
One of the features at the centre used to include Technopolis where people were allowed to feel part of Lanarkshire's past, by re-creating scenes of eras including heavy industry and steel production. Domestic life of the area is re-created through various talking figures and interactive interpretation. However this part of the Heritage Centre was closed in 2011 and turned over to the storage of paper archives.

There is also a gallery room, located at the ground floor, showing exhibitions provided by North Lanarkshire Council and also exhibitions outwith the local council area. Some international exhibitions are also on display there, and exhibitions are updated regularly.

The local studies and family research room is where reference media such as PC's and Microfilm are based, that allow visitors to browse through local and personal records, usually to search for family ties or former occupations.

Also, based within the heritage centre, is the viewing tower, located on the fifth floor of the building, giving an excellent view of the Clyde Valley region, the Campsie Fells, and of mountains from Tinto Hill to as far back as Ben Lomond, usually only viewable in sunny conditions.

As well as those features, there is a gift shop that sells a range of books about local heritage, and also items typical of a museum/heritage centre gift shop (postcards, toys, sweets etc.).

The centre is also wheelchair accessible, with lifts in operation inside the centre.
