= Sandy McNaughton =

Scottish footballer

Personal information
- Full name: Alexander Crawford McNaughton
- Date of birth: 1 December 1953 (age 72)
- Place of birth: Motherwell, Scotland
- Position: Forward

Senior career*
Years	Team	Apps	(Gls)
1972–1977	Queen's Park	96	(21)
1977–1978	Clydebank	16	(0)
1978	Clyde	6	(0)
1978–1979	Stenhousemuir	25	(16)
1979–1982	Dunfermline Athletic	109	(50)
1982–1984	Ayr United	46	(8)
1984–1985	East Stirlingshire	5	(2)
1984–1986	Stenhousemuir	46	(12)
1987–1988	Deveronvale		
1988–1996	Cove Rangers		

International career
1973	Scotland Amateurs	2	(0)

Managerial career
- 1996–1998: Inverurie Loco Works (joint-manager)
- 1998–2001: Banks O'Dee (joint-manager)
- * Club domestic league appearances and goals

Alexander Crawford McNaughton (born 1 December 1953) is a Scottish retired footballer, best remembered for his time as a forward in the Scottish League with Dunfermline Athletic and Queen's Park. He also played for Stenhousemuir, Ayr United, Clydebank, Clyde and East Stirlingshire. He later embarked on a playing and coaching career in Scottish lower-league football.

== Personal life ==
McNaughton attended Calder Primary School and Dalziel High School. In 1987, McNaughton was appointed Principal Teacher of PE at Kincorth Academy.
