= Dalziel Park =

Coordinates: 55.7993°N 3.9448°W

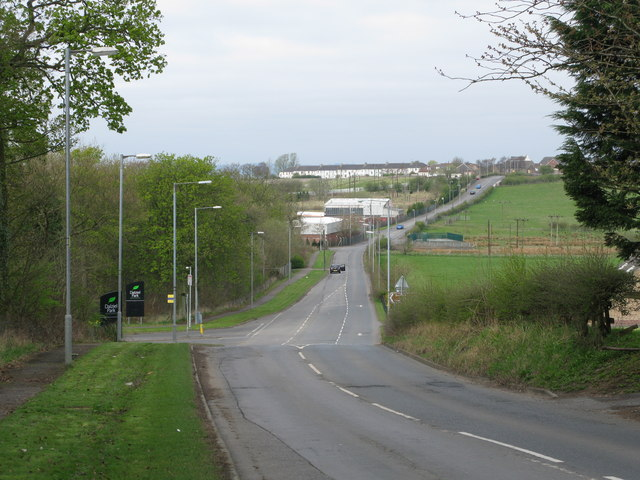
- Chapelknowe Road looking west - entrance to Dalziel Park on left

- Location within North Lanarkshire
- OS grid reference: NS780995
- Council area: North Lanarkshire
- Lieutenancy area: Lanarkshire
- Country: Scotland
- Sovereign state: United Kingdom
- Post town: MOTHERWELL
- Postcode district: ML1 5
- Dialling code: 01698
- Police: Scotland
- Fire: Scottish
- Ambulance: Scottish
- UK Parliament: Motherwell and Wishaw
- Scottish Parliament: Motherwell and Wishaw Central Scotland

Dalziel Park is an area located between the villages of Carfin, Cleland and Newarthill in North Lanarkshire, Scotland. Other nearby settlements include the large town of Motherwell and the new town of Ravenscraig. The area consists of a residential estate, a sports facility, a golf course and a clubhouse. It is also used as the home venue for the local rugby team Dalziel, as well as the training ground for the local professional football team Motherwell.

== History ==
The park was established by the Dalziel War Memorial Trust, an organisation formed to offer a living memorial to the pupils and staff of the Motherwell-based Dalziel High School who lost their lives during World War I and World War II.

On 27 June 1947, the former pupils committee of Dalziel decided that the school's memorial of the pupils who died during both wars should take the form of playing fields. The former Cleland Estate was put up for sale by the Right Honourable Sir John Colville, P.C., G.C.I.E, for only six thousand pounds. For the purchase to be possible, there was much fundraising along with a grant provided by the Lanarkshire Education Committee. After the purchase, playing fields for hockey, rugby, and football were laid, and later an athletics track would also be included. In 1990, the War Memorial Trust took up the challenge of maintaining the facility, converting the former Cleland Estate into Dalziel Park.

On 2 October 2004 the Clubhouse was opened, officially ending a long and determined journey that the War Memorial Trust embarked upon to sell a portion of land for housing and also build a top-quality sports facility, overcoming the main problems including high costs for maintenance. Initially only a handful of playing fields were formed, but that number slowly increased and the reputation of the sports facility started to grow. On 5 April 2001, The Princess Royal formally opened the playing fields and as soon as the clubhouse was built, the vision became a reality. The War Memorial Trust, in existence for more than half-a-century, remain committed to keeping the facility as maintained and successful as possible.

== Layout ==
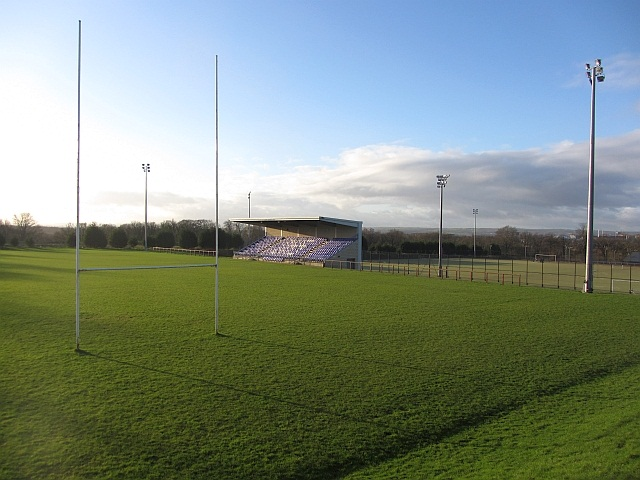
The main rugby pitch, with a grandstand capable of holding 384 spectators.

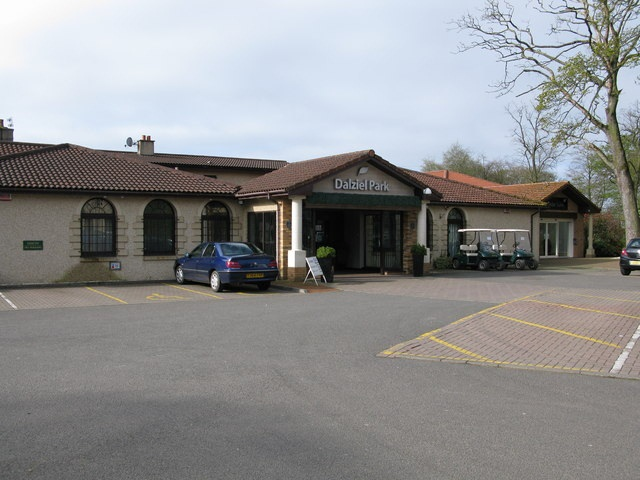
Hotel and Conference Centre

The area also contains a development of high-quality housing (approximately 230 residences, coming under the Murdostoun council ward) accessed from Chapelknowe Road, which is right next to a large golf course. As well as this, Dalziel Park contains a Hotel and Conference Centre, built on the site of the demolished Cleland House mansion which has a restaurant and overnight accommodation; the property was purchased by the leisure company operated by former footballer Harry Hood in 2011.

The sports facility caters for many sports, such as hockey, football, athletics, rugby and tennis, and has pitches, tracks and courts for each of these sports. There is a main rugby playing field located next to the hockey pitches and changing areas, and this is where the rugby team Dalziel RFC play all of their home games. The pitch also contains a grandstand with a seating capacity of 384 spectators.

The local Scottish Premiership side Motherwell F.C. use the football pitches of the facility for training. The club's reserve team often play friendly matches against other reserve sides at the facility. Since 2017, local amateur side Colville Park A.F.C. also play their home matches at Dalziel Park, as do Dalziel HSFP AFC, which like the rugby team has a connection with the school.
