= Terry Lineen =

NZ international rugby union player (1936–2020)

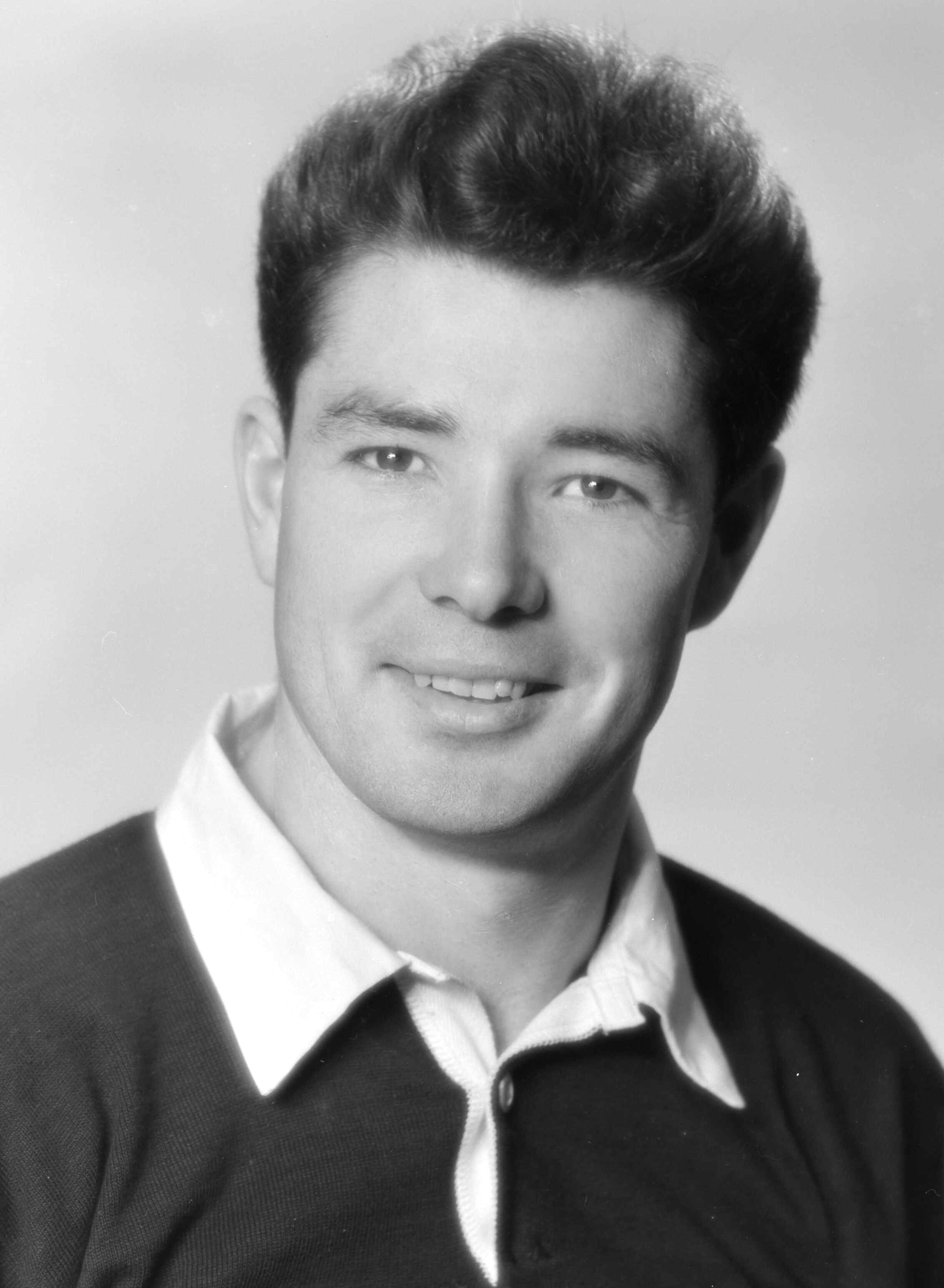
- Lineen in 1957
- Born: Terence Raymond Lineen; 5 January 1936 Auckland, New Zealand
- Died: 17 February 2020 (aged 84) Auckland, New Zealand
- Height: 1.83 m (6 ft 0 in)
- Weight: 79 kg (174 lb)
- School: Sacred Heart College, Auckland
- Notable relative: Sean Lineen (son)

Rugby union career
- Position: Second five-eighth and centre
Provincial / State sides
Years	Team	Apps	(Points)
1955–59	Auckland	57	
International career
Years	Team	Apps	(Points)
1957–60	New Zealand	12	(0)

Terence Raymond Lineen (5 January 1936 – 17 February 2020) was a New Zealand rugby union player. A second five-eighth and centre three-quarter, Lineen represented Auckland at a provincial level, and was a member of the New Zealand national side, the All Blacks, from 1957 to 1960. He played 35 matches for the All Blacks including 12 internationals.

Lineen died in Auckland on 17 February 2020 at the age of 84.
