= Dalziel RFC =

Scottish rugby union club, based in Motherwell

- Full name: Dalziel Rugby Football Club
- Union: Scottish Rugby Union
- Founded: 1924
- Region: Glasgow and District Rugby Union
- Ground(s): Dalziel Park; Motherwell, Scotland (Capacity: 2000 (384 Seated))
- President: (Scotland) John Mathieson
- Coach(es): (Scotland) Graham Calder
- Captain(s): (Scotland) Fraser McKenzie
- League(s): West Division Two
- 2019–20: West Division One, 2nd of 10
1st kit	2nd kit	3rd kit

Official website
- www.dalzielrugby.com

Dalziel Rugby Football Club, formerly known as Dalziel High School Former Pupils Rugby Club, currently has a playing and social membership hailing from Motherwell, Wishaw, Bellshill and other parts of Lanarkshire, Scotland. Historically the club was closely associated with Dalziel High School in Motherwell from which it takes its name. A number of current players are former pupils of Dalziel High School. However, during the 1990s it was felt that the club should drop the "former pupil" tag and be known, in what was felt to be a more inclusive manner, as Dalziel RFC.

The club play in West Division Two and have their home playing grounds at Dalziel Park close to Carfin, just outside Motherwell. They support three senior XVs, under 18s, under 16s, under 15s, S2s and S1s, as well as a large mini rugby section for players of primary school age.

== History ==
The story of Dalziel Rugby Club began in the year 1924 when their first ever game was played.

The inaugural match took place on 5 January against Uddingston 2nd XV, and Dalziel won by 9–5. By 1926 Dalziel High School had started to play rugby and they shared the facilities of the Rugby Football Club, which were at that time located in Motherwell's Ladywell Road. By 1931 the developing links between the Rugby Football Club and the high school became formalised with the setting up of the Dalziel High School Former Pupils’ Rugby Club. The name Dalziel RFC disappeared and the new club, Dalziel High School Former Pupils was formed. This guaranteed a regular supply of players from the local school whilst giving young men an opportunity to play a competitive team sport.

With the arrival of World War II, the club ceased its rugby playing activities until it was re-formed in the immediate post war years by the late Harry Morton OBE, who was a longstanding player, captain and honorary president of the club until his death in 1992. Cleland Estate, now known as Dalziel Park, was purchased by Dalziel High School in 1947 to be set up as a war memorial to all of the school pupils who had been lost in the two world wars. Dalziel High School FP Rugby Club then began to use the newly created facilities at Cleland Estate.

In season 1973–74, the Scottish Rugby Union set up competitive leagues and Dalziel HSFP found that they were slotted into National League Division Five (West). In the first season of competition, the club obtained promotion to Division Four and by season 1980-81 they were playing in Division Three. By season 1987–88, Dalziel had moved through the leagues to Division Two and this had confirmed their status as the leading national club in Lanarkshire, also making them one of the top thirty-five clubs in the country. In the same season, the club won the Glasgow and District Knock-out Cup for the very first time.

Dalziel RFC's position in Scotland since the inception of the league system in 1973

By the mid-1970s, shortly after the commencement of National League Rugby, the ‘F.P’ tag was dropped from the club name with the club reflecting modern trends and becoming fully open. Over many years prior to this, a large number of club members, who were not school F.P.s had contributed greatly to the club in many areas. At that time, the club reverted to its name of Dalziel Rugby Club, although then, as now, the club maintained very strong links with Dalziel High School.

Dalziel Rugby Club is a progressive, warm and welcoming club and is eager to introduce new members from all sections of the community to enjoy the great game of rugby football at the tremendous facilities located at Dalziel Park. All new members are welcomed, whether for P3 or the over 70s age group!

The present team set up at Dalziel Rugby is as follows:

- Mini section (meet Saturday mornings), comprising teams from primary one to primary seven.
- Midi section, comprising S1, S2, S3, under-16, under-17 and under-18 teams (meet Sunday afternoons with the exception of under-18s).
- Senior section, comprising 4XVs.

Over many years, the club has developed young players and made contributions to the Lanarkshire, Glasgow District and National Rugby Teams with a number of under 18, under 19 and under 20 players gaining international honours at those levels.

The club has also produced a number of referees, who are contributing in refereeing games at all levels throughout Scottish rugby. The club also encourages any player who wishes to extend their refereeing skills and contribute to Scottish rugby in this way.

A more recent development within the club is the decision to consider forming a past players' organisation, which would be pro-active and inform past players of the opportunities for playing, refereeing, spectating, advertising or sponsoring rugby at Dalziel.

The Annual Festival of Youth Rugby, masterminded annually by past president Alan Calder, has been running since 1991. With some 800 players, coaches and officials visiting Dalziel Park on the third Saturday in April each year, Dalziel Rugby Club has now firmly plotted its name on the Scottish rugby map as a club which caters for the whole range of participants seeking to play the game.

== Recent seasons ==
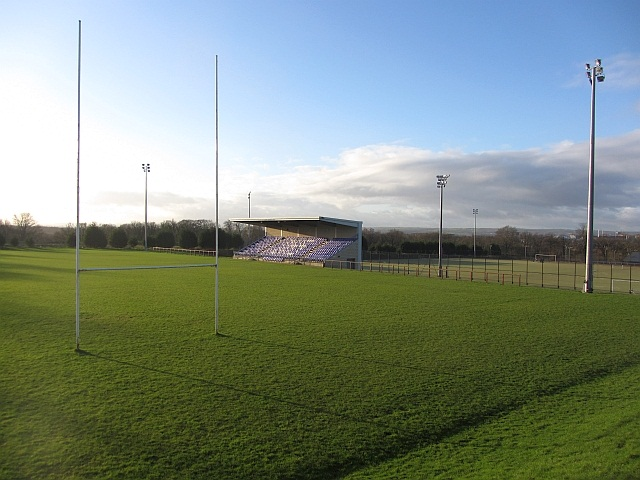
The grandstand on the main pitch of Dalziel Park.

Season 2007–08, while disappointing with respect to the league, culminated in the club's first appearance at Murrayfield in the Scottish Bowl Final where they lost 18–10 to Preston Lodge RFC. The following season the club appointed a new coach and were much improved from previous seasons, but ultimately finishing third behind promoted Dumfries and Howe of Fife. The club's Second XV, however, won their league securing promotion to the National Reserve League, where they would be pitted against the second teams of many Premier One and Premier Two clubs.

Season 2009–10 saw the club go undefeated in the league, winning all 22 games to secure promotion to the Premier Leagues. After Orkney RFC's defeat to Strathmore on 9 May, Dalziel remained the only undefeated team in the Scottish League for that season. Reinforcing the club's first team were strong performances by the second and third teams who finished in the credible positions of fifth and third in their respective leagues.

== Dalziel Sevens ==
The club runs the Dalziel Sevens tournament. It began in 1980.

== Club honours ==
=== 1st XV ===
National League Division 3 (level 3)

- Runners-up: 1987-88

National League Division 4/National League Division 1 (level 4)

- Winners: 1980–81, 2009–10

National League Division 5 (West)/National League Division 2 (level 5)

- Runners-up: 1973–74, 2002–03

Glasgow and District Cup:

- Winners: 1987-88

Scottish Bowl:

- Runners-up: 2007-08

West Regional Shield:

- Runners-up: 2018-19

=== 2nd XV ===
Scottish Division 2

- Winners: 1980-81

Division 4 (West):

- Winners: 2008-09
- Runners-up: 2005-06

Division 6:

- Winners: 1997-98

Division 7:

- Winners: 1996-97

=== Third XV ===
Scottish Reserve League Division West 3

- Winners: 2010-11

=== Sevens ===
- Wigtownshire Sevens
  - Champions: 1952, 1953
- Waysiders Drumpellier Sevens
  - Champions: 1994
- Old Aloysians Sevens
  - Champions: 1979
- Lanarkshire Sevens
  - Champions: 1970, 1985, 1988
- Glasgow University Sevens
  - Champions: 1993
- Hamilton Sevens
  - Champions: 1983
