= Alan Fisher (broadcast journalist) =

Scottish broadcast journalist and war correspondent

- Born: Motherwell, North Lanarkshire, Scotland
- Occupations: TV presenter and journalist
- Years active: 1983–present
- Employer(s): Al Jazeera English (2005–present); GMTV (1992–2005); Scottish TV (1990–1992); Grampian TV (1986–1990); Northsound Radio; Moray Firth Radio; Motherwell Times
- Website: alanfisher.tv

Alan Fisher is a Scottish broadcast journalist and war correspondent.

For many years he worked at GMTV, but now works for international news channel Al Jazeera English, where he was announced as the Chief US Correspondent in November 2025 based at the broadcast centre in Washington, D.C.

== Early life ==
Fisher was born in Motherwell in Scotland and attended Dalziel High School.

He studied journalism at what was then Napier College in Edinburgh. He later graduated with an M.A. from the University of Leicester, where he wrote his thesis on the work of war correspondents.

== Career ==
Fisher began his career writing for his local newspaper The Motherwell Times and broadcasting on Hospital Radio Law while still at High school. He also appeared as a panelist on a BBC Scotland Sunday afternoon current affairs for teenagers called "The Sunday Club". His first job was at Moray Firth Radio in 1983. And then North Sound Radio before he moved to what was then Grampian TV (now STV North) and then Scottish TV before moving to GMTV, where he worked for 13 years. In 2005 he joined Al Jazeera. He worked at both GMTV and Al Jazeera while they were launching new services. He joined GMTV in 1992. GMTV was launched in January 1993. While at GMTV, Fisher was Ireland correspondent based in Belfast for three years, senior news correspondent based in London for four and chief correspondent for six years. Al Jazeera English was launched in 2006.

Fisher reported from Iraq during the 2003 invasion for GMTV. While at GMTV, he also covered the Irish ceasefire agreements in 1994, the Dunblane school massacre in 1996, the Indian earthquake in 2001, and the 2005 London bombings on 7/7. Fisher interviewed Irish President Mary Robinson in 1993. He said the death of Princess Diana was the biggest news event he covered while at GMTV.

While based in the United States, Fisher has covered Republican Party presidential candidate Mitt Romney's presidential campaign in 2012. He anchored Al Jazeera's coverage from the 2012 Republican National Convention in Tampa and co-anchored coverage of the three presidential and one vice-president debate. He also featured heavily in the station's coverage of President Barack Obama's second inauguration. He wrote the book Romney's Run following the election with all profits going to journalism charities. He covered Donald Trump's 2016 presidential campaign, the 2020 United States presidential election and was the journalist who provided live commentary on both Barack Obama and Donald Trump's final moments in the White House as president. He also reported extensively on the second impeachment trial of Donald Trump. In 2022, Fisher reported extensively from Ukraine during the war with Russia. He also reported from Edinburgh and London on the death of Queen Elizabeth II providing live commentary at key moments. Fisher spent two months at the end of 2023, reporting from Jerusalem, Tel Aviv and Ramallah on the war in Gaza. In 2024, he covered the successful Trump Presidential campaign, reporting around the country then live from West Palm Beach, Florida on the evening of the election.

In March 2026, Fisher anchored the launch of the new Al Jazeera segment "This is America" from the Washington studios. It has become a regular part of Jazeera's weekday programming, with rotating anchors.

For the "Talk to Al Jazeera" series, his interviewees have included Martin McGuiness; Joyce Banda and Bill and Melinda Gates.

I As a reporter for GMTV, Fisher intervened on behalf of dual US-British citizen Kenny Richey who was on death row in the United States. Fisher contacted actress Susan Sarandon, provided her with GMTV reports, and issued an authorised statement on her behalf. Fisher acted on Richey's behalf one year after interviewing him in prison. He is a former director and trustee of the Institute of Contemporary Scotland

== Awards ==
Fisher was nominated for story of the year in 2008 by the Foreign Press Association in London, for his Al Jazeera piece called "Russian Advance from Gori to Tbilisi", which was written while covering the Russia–Georgia war. In that story, he followed a Russian military convoy to Tbilisi. His reports were also part of the International News Emmy nominations that Al Jazeera English received for its coverage in Georgia and during the Israeli offensive in Gaza. He was a significant part of the team which covered the 2011 Egyptian revolution, for which the channel won a Peabody Award. A patron of the Young UK programme, which aims to develop the mind and broaden the horizons of young people under the age of 30, he was awarded the Inveramsay Medal in recognition of his efforts with the charity.

== Other work ==
Fisher made a guest appearance as a journalist on the ITV program Bad Girls in 2005.

He also raised thousands of pounds for the British Heart Foundation - officially starting, then riding, in the inaugural Oxford Cambridge Bike ride and raising money in subsequent years.

He wrote a chapter for the academic and journalism book Mirage in the Desert: Reporting the Arab Spring covering the use of social media and its application for Al Jazeera's award-winning coverage of the Arab Spring. This article was later cited by academic Stuart Allan in his book "Citizen Witnessing: Key Concepts in Journalism". He has also written and spoken about the growing use of social media by journalists. He also co-authored a chapter to the book "Reporting from the Wars 1850 – 2015 - The origins and evolution of the war correspondent"

Fisher was mentioned in the book An English Fan Abroad for his performance in a football match between English and German supporters at Euro 2000 after he scored two goals for the England side.

He has been a speaker and chair of conferences, and has spoken on the role of journalists and breaking news coverage in a crisis. He has been involved in a number of events to mark Press Freedom Day. His contribution to the ICTD Conference in Atlanta was described by one of the organisers as a "brilliant tour de force" He has also chaired events at the Edinburgh International Television Festival, including a debate entitled "TV War: What is it Good For".

He has spoken and lectured at the London School of Economics' Summer School and at a number of universities in the UK and abroad.
