= Spanish Civil War memorial, Motherwell =

Memorial in Motherwell, Scotland

Coordinates: 55.78505°N 3.99491°W

A Memorial to the Spanish Civil War is sited at the Duchess of Hamilton Park in Motherwell in Scotland.

It is dedicated to the 40 local volunteers of the International Brigades that fought for the Republican cause in the Spanish Civil War between 1936 and 1939. 11 of the volunteers were killed in the war. The journalist Ethel MacDonald was the only female volunteer to travel from Lanarkshire to fight in the conflict. The memorial is inscribed with the Republican motto '¡No Pasarán!' ('they shall not pass').

The memorial was erected by the No Pasaran Memorial Committee of North Lanarkshire. It was unveiled on 20 July 2013.

An annual service is held at the memorial to remember the local volunteers who went to fight for the Republican side in the war. The flag of the Spanish Republic has been flown from Motherwell Civic Centre by North Lanarkshire council on several occasions to remember the volunteers.

The memorial was vandalised with the words "Franco" and "vermin" in June 2021.

== Inscription ==
Obverse inscription:

SPAIN/ 1936-1939/ Dedicated to the Volunteers/ from the communities of North Lanarkshire/ who fought against fascism and in/ defence of liberty and democracy in/ the Spanish Civil War/ pour la par, la libertad y la democracia/ ! NO PASARANI!

Reverse inscription:

! NO PASARANI!/ They gave up everything-their loves, their/ countries, home and fortune. fathers. mothers,/ wives, brothers, sisters and children./ They gave us everything-their youth or their/ maturity, their science or their experience,/ their blood and their lives, their hopes and/ aspirations- for the cause of all advanced and/ progressive mankind/ You are History/ You are Legend
