= Iain Kennedy (rugby union) =

Scottish rugby union player

- Born: Iain Kennedy; 22 August 1985 (age 41) Scotland
- Height: 183 cm (6 ft 0 in)
- Weight: 86 kg (13 st 8 lb)
- School: Lenzie Academy
- University: Stirling University

Rugby union career
- Position: Fly-half
Youth career
- -: Lenzie Academy
Amateur team(s)
Years	Team	Apps	(Points)
2003-05	Glasgow Hutchesons Aloysians		
2005-06	Glasgow Hawks		
2006	Glasgow Hutchesons Aloysians		
Senior career
Years	Team	Apps	(Points)
2005-06	Glasgow Warriors	1	(0)
International career
Years	Team	Apps	(Points)
- Scotland U18
–	Scotland U19		
–	Scotland U21		

Iain Kennedy (born 22 August 1985, in Scotland) is a former Scotland U21 international rugby union player. He played at Fly-half.

== Amateur career ==
He started playing his youth rugby for Lenzie Academy first XV. He became captain of the side.

He moved to play for Glasgow Hutchesons Aloysians in season 2003-04.

In season 2005-06 he played his rugby for Glasgow Hawks. The following season 2006-07 he played for Glasgow Hutchesons Aloysians again.

== Professional career ==
In 2003-04 Kennedy was mentored by Joe Naufahu in the Warriors academy program.

In season 2005-06 he formally joined Glasgow Warriors as an academy player in their Elite Development Program.

He was named player of the tournament in the 2005-06 Jenkins & Marr Glasgow City Sevens. The Warriors reached the final, only to be beaten by Edinburgh Rugby 40-24.

He had a viral bug and knee injury which curtailed his appearances that season.

However he did play competitively for Glasgow Warriors in the Celtic League against Connacht coming on at half time for Graydon Staniforth on 25 May 2006.

While with the Warriors he took part in community visits. He attended Wellington School in Ayrshire with James Eddie for a skills session with the pupils.

== International career ==
Kennedy was capped at age grades for Scotland at Scotland U18s, Scotland U19s and Scotland U21s levels.

== Outside rugby ==
Kennedy is now a Pastoral Assistant at Gateway Church, Poole.
