= Andrew Farley (rugby union) =

Australian rugby union player

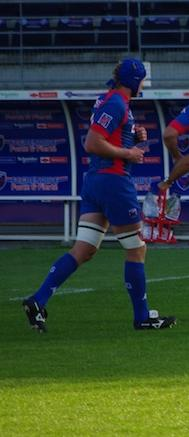
- Andrew farley
- Born: Andrew Bruce Farley; 21 August 1980 (age 46) Brisbane, Australia
- Height: 198 cm (6 ft 6 in)
- Weight: 112 kg (247 lb)

Rugby union career
- Position: Second Row
- Current team: FC Grenoble
Amateur team(s)
Years	Team	Apps	(Points)
1990-2000	GPS Rugby		
Senior career
Years	Team	Apps	(Points)
2000	L'Aquila	6	(0)
2001	Otago		
2002-03	Swansea	5	(5)
2009-2014	Grenoble	107	(20)
- Correct as of 12 April 2014
Provincial / State sides
Years	Team	Apps	(Points)
2003-09	Connacht	154	(10)
Super Rugby
Years	Team	Apps	(Points)
2001	Reds	2	(0)
International career
Years	Team	Apps	(Points)
1998-99	Australia U19		
2001	Australia U21		
2007	Ireland A	3	(0)

Andrew Bruce Farley played professional rugby union, and represented several teams including the Queensland Reds, Otago Rugby Football Union, L'Aquila Rugby, Swansea RFC, Connacht Rugby and FC Grenoble where after retiring, became GM of Rugby Operations.

He was born in Brisbane, Australia on 21 August 1980, to English born father Terence and New Zealand born mother Christine. He started playing rugby at 10 years of age at Marist College Ashgrove. His rugby career commenced when he was selected in the Queensland and Australian Schoolboys. The following year, 1998, he gained selection in the inaugural Reds Rugby College (Junior Queensland Reds). This led him to be selected in Queensland and Australian under 19. Highlights included the Australia under 19 team who played the curtain raiser the 1999 Bledisloe Cup at Stadium Australia which had a record crowd of over 100,000.

== Early career ==
The following season he travelled to Italy to play for L'Aquila Rugby coached by former All Black Michael Brewer. After being there for a half season he returned to Australia to once again play for Queensland under 21, and after playing a successful National Championship he was selected in the Australian under 21 World Cup team who finished runner up to the Junior All Blacks in Sydney. He then travelled to Otago where he was a member of the 2001 NPC development squad where he was coached by Laurie Mains. After the NPC with Otago he returned to Australia to join the Queensland Reds receiving 2 caps that season. Following his two caps, former Reds, Bath, Stade Francais and Wallabies coach John Connelly contacted him with a suggestion of returning to the northern hemisphere, this time to play for Swansea RFC. After the season with the Queensland Reds he played his first game for Swansea RFC against Munster in the 5th round of the Celtic League. Swansea starting XV was his home for the 2002–03 season. After the merging of Welsh clubs at the end of 2002–03 season he was presented with an opportunity to join the Irish province Connacht Connacht Rugby.

== Connacht Rugby ==
During his time at Connacht Rugby, he captained the side for 3 seasons and played over 100 Celtic League games. He also made over 50 appearances in the European Challenge Cup and Heineken Cup collectively.

The highlight of his time with Connacht was captaining his side against the Springboks in a 2007 world cup warm up game where the Connacht team showed a lot a pride and resilience in an 18 – 3 loss to the eventual world cup winners.

While playing in Ireland for Connacht Rugby, he gained Irish residency and was selected to play for Ireland A in the 2007 Barclays Churchill Cup which was hosted at Exeter Chiefs' Sandy Park for group matches against Canada & New Zealand Maori and the Finals at Twickenham Stadiumwhere he played against Scotland 'A'.

== FC Grenoble ==
After 6 seasons at Connacht Rugby, Andrew's career turned over a new page and saw him signing in the 09/10 season for French Rugby Pro D2 Club FC Grenoble. After only one season with FC Grenoble he was named captain and lead them to 2nd place in the 2010/11 Pro D2 Championship. In 2011 he signed a new 2-year contract with the club taking him through to the end of the 2012/13 season. In the first year of his new contract he guided FC Grenoble to Champions of France Pro D2 and taking FC Grenoble back to Top 14 for the first time since 2006. For the following 2 years FC Grenoble successfully retained their position in Top 14 under his captaincy until his retirement in 2014.

== Honours ==
=== Ireland A ===
While playing in Ireland for Connacht Rugby, he gained Irish residency and was selected to play for Ireland A in the 2007 Barclays Churchill Cup which was hosted at Exeter Chiefs' Sandy Park for group matches against Canada & New Zealand Maori and the Finals at Twickenham Stadium where Ireland beat Scotland 'A' in the Plate Final.

=== Other ===
In season 2015/2016 Andrew was inducted into the Connacht Rugby Supporters Club (Connacht Clan) Hall of Fame.

== Post-playing career ==
In June 2014, Andrew retired from professional rugby at the age of 34. He immediately took on the role of Team Manager (Manager Sportif) at FC Grenoble which he occupied for two seasons. After the club was relegated to Pro D2, he became GM of Rugby Operations. In his second year of being GM of Rugby Operations he once again successfully guided FC Grenoble to Champions of France Pro D2 and taking FC Grenoble back once again to the Top 14.

In July 2018, after 16 years away from Australia Andrew made the decision to leave Europe and rugby to return to Brisbane where he lives with his wife and 3 children. Andrew now works as General Manager of a company specialising in Construction Technology.

== Sources ==
- www.lnr.fr
- www.fcgrugby.com
- www.connachtrugby.ie
- www.magnersleague.com
- www.ercrugby.com
- www.irishrugby.ie
