= Gregor Hayter =

Scottish rugby union player

- Born: Gregor Hayter; 13 August 1976 (age 50) Scotland
- Height: 6 ft 5 in (1.96 m)
- Weight: 118 kg (18 st 8 lb)
- School: Elgin Academy, Moray
- University: University of Dundee

Rugby union career
- Position: Lock
Amateur team(s)
| Years | Team | Apps | (Points) |
- Moray
| – | Dundee HSFP | | |
| – | Watsonians | | |
| – | Crociati Parma Rugby FC | | |
| – | Rugby Viadana | | |
| – | Stirling County | | |
| – | Sheffield Tigers | | |
Senior career
| Years | Team | Apps | (Points) |
- Caledonia Reds
- Edinburgh Rugby
| 2005-06 | Glasgow Warriors | 18 | (5) |
| 2006- | Newbury | | |
| – | Rotherham Titans | | |
International career
| Years | Team | Apps | (Points) |
- Scotland U18
| – | Scotland U21 | | |
| – | England Counties XV | | |
Coaching career
- Years: Team
- Sheffield Tigers

Gregor Hayter (born 13 August 1976 in Scotland) is a Scottish former rugby union player who played for Glasgow Warriors at the Lock position. He also previously played for Caledonia Reds and Edinburgh Rugby.

He also spent five years in Italy playing for Crociati Parma Rugby FC and Rugby Viadana.

He also played for Newbury, Rotherham Titans and played and coached Sheffield Tigers.

He played for England Counties XV and Scotland at age grade.

He now works offshore as an electrical technician.
