= Spencer Davey =

English rugby union player

Spencer Davey (born 3 February 1983 (age 43) in Taunton) is a rugby union player for the Newcastle Falcons in the Guinness Premiership. He plays as a centre.

He played in the Under 21 Rugby World Championship, later playing inside centre in twenty-eight games in the Premiership for Bath Rugby. In 2006, he played in the Celtic League for the Glasgow Warriors.

He originally signed with the Falcons in 2008, transferring from the Doncaster Knights. He played eleven games in his initial season with the Falcons before tearing a ligament in his knee and requiring surgery.
