= Motherwell =

Coordinates: 55.7839°N 3.9852°W

Motherwell: Scottish Gaelic: Tobar na Màthar; Scots: Mitherwall; Steelopolis
- Town and administrative centre
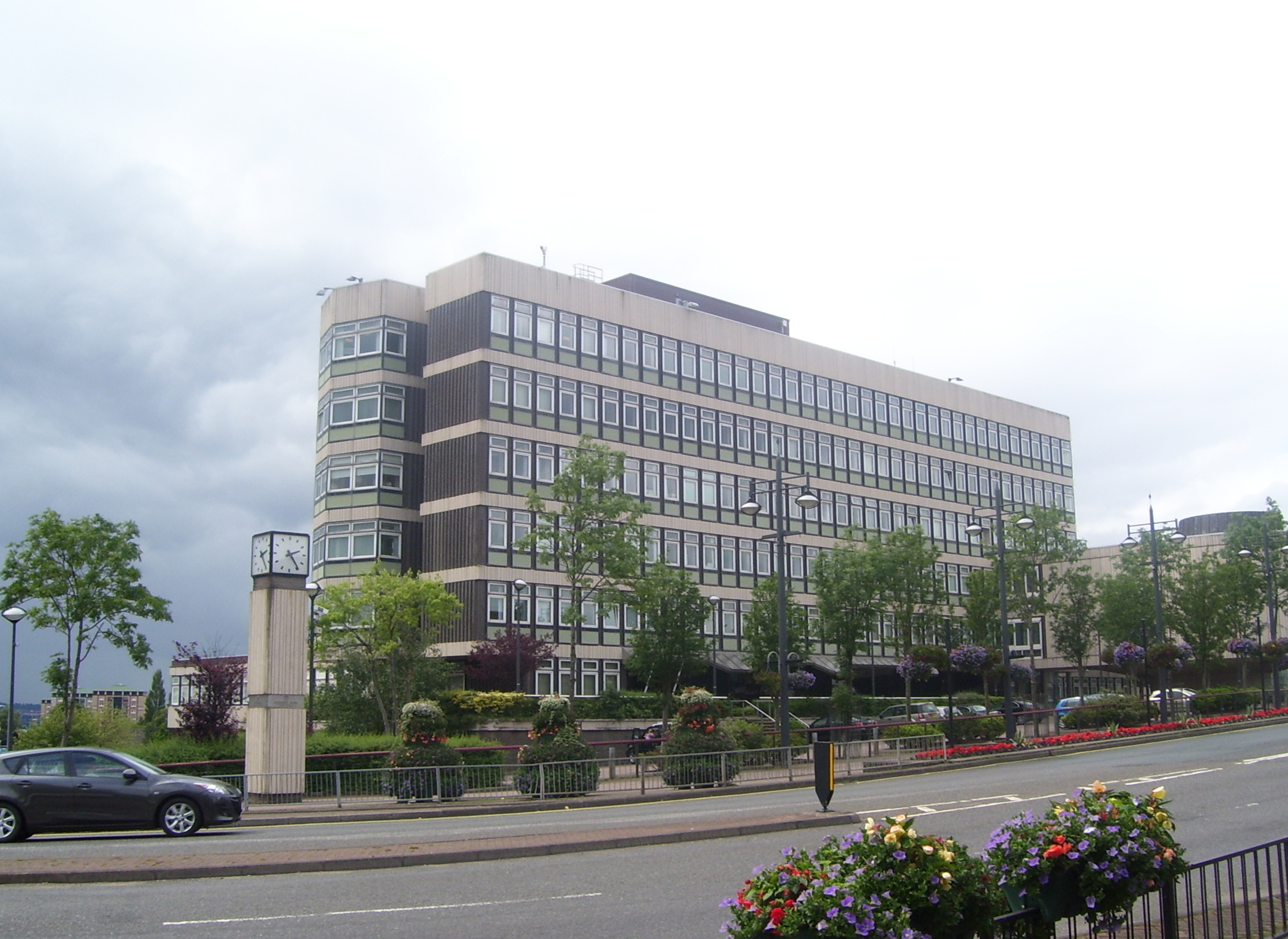
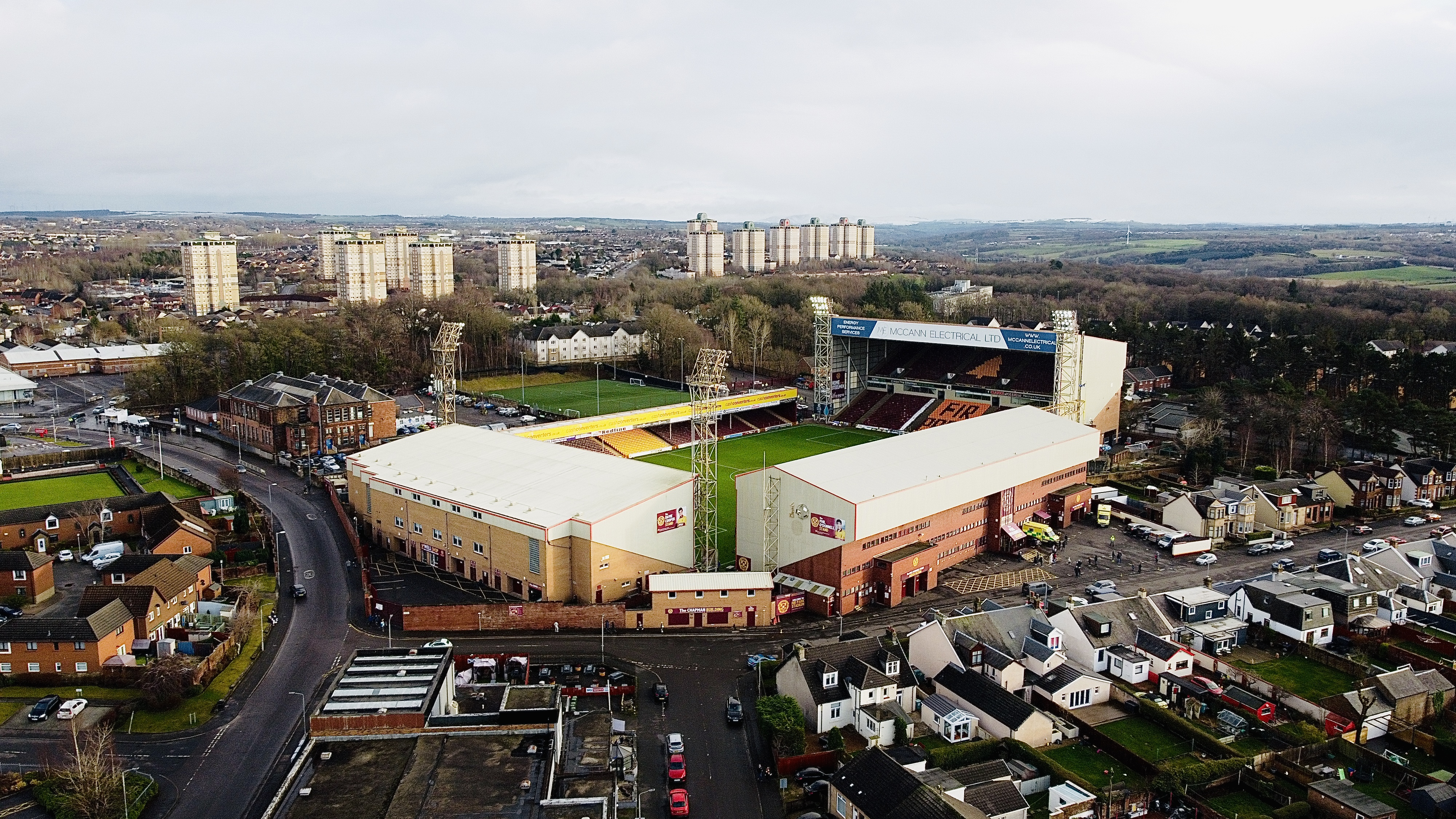
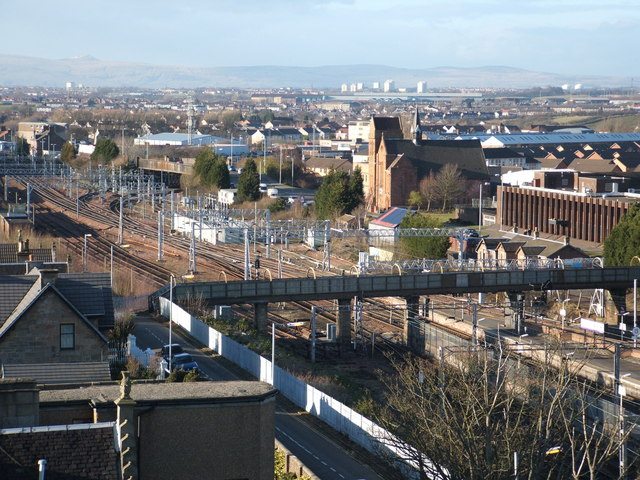
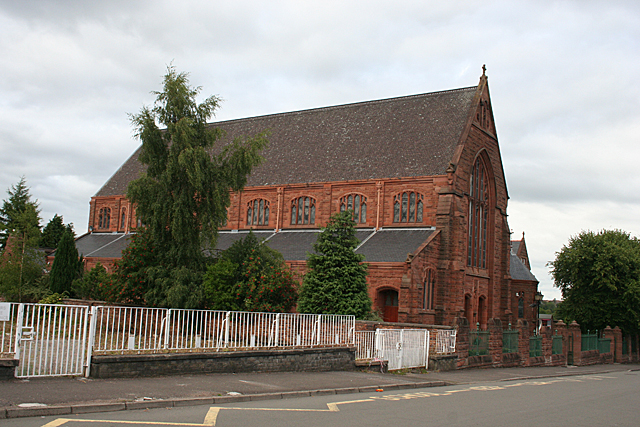
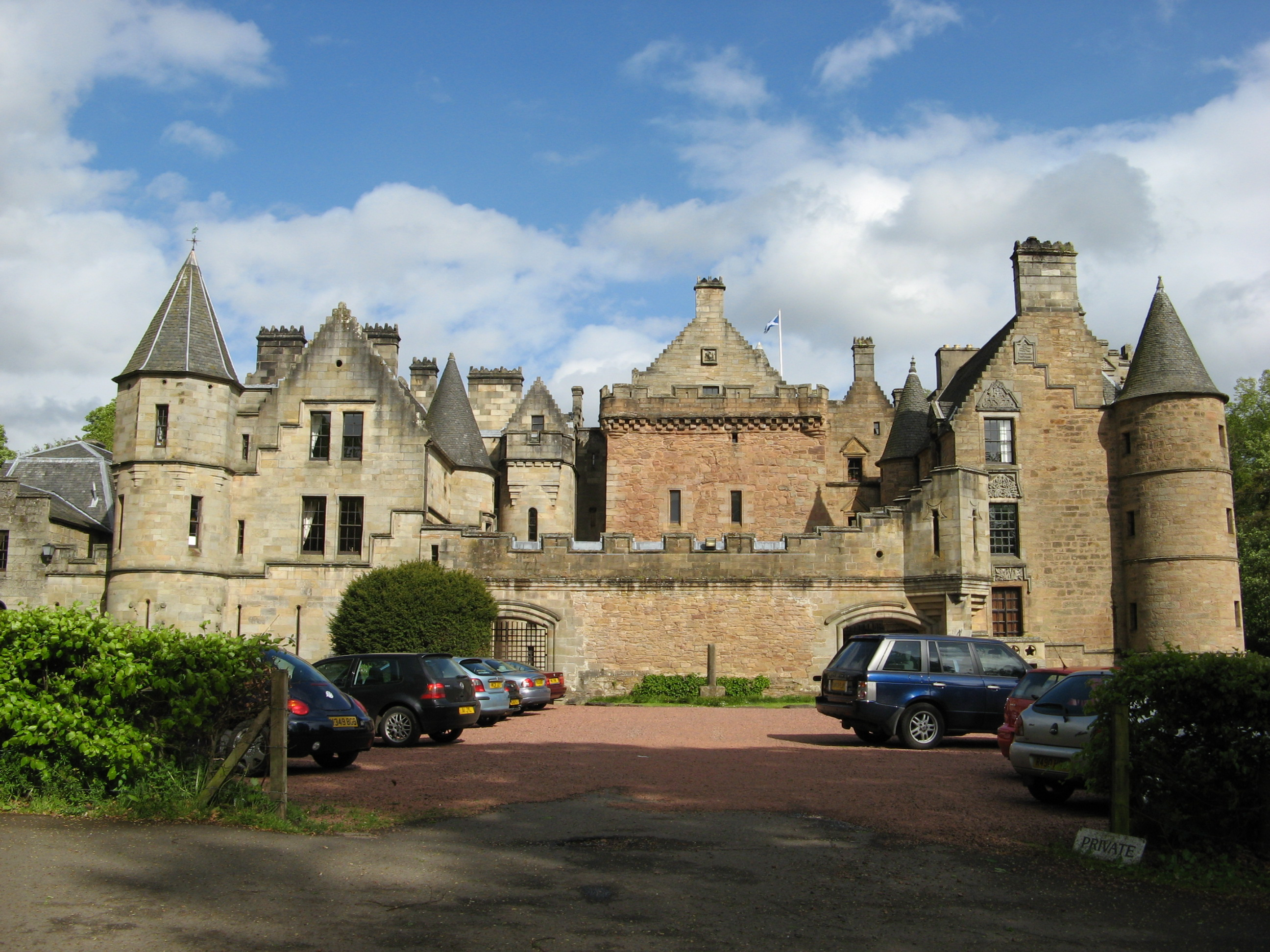
- Civic Centre Fir Park Skyline over Motherwell The Cathedral Dalzell House

- Location within North Lanarkshire
- Area: 14.28 km^{2} (5.51 sq mi)
- Population: 32,840 (2020)
  - Density: 2,300/km^{2} (6,000/sq mi)
  - Edinburgh: 31 mi (50 km) ENE
  - London: 335 mi (539 km) SSE
- Council area: North Lanarkshire
- Lieutenancy area: Lanarkshire
- Country: Scotland
- Sovereign state: United Kingdom
- Post town: MOTHERWELL
- Postcode district: ML1
- Dialling code: 01698
- Police: Scotland
- Fire: Scottish
- Ambulance: Scottish
- UK Parliament: Motherwell, Wishaw and Carluke
- Scottish Parliament: Motherwell and Wishaw

Motherwell (Scots: Mitherwall, Scottish Gaelic: Tobar na Màthar) is a town and former burgh in North Lanarkshire, Scotland, around 12 miles (19 km) south east of Glasgow. It has a population of around 32,120. Historically in the parish of Dalziel and part of Lanarkshire, Motherwell is the headquarters for North Lanarkshire Council. Geographically the River Clyde separates Motherwell from Hamilton to the west whereas the South Calder Water separates Motherwell from Carfin to the north-east and New Stevenston and Bellshill towards the north.

Motherwell is also geographically attached to Wishaw and the two towns form a large urban area in North Lanarkshire, with both towns having similar populations and strong community ties.

== History ==
A Roman road through central Scotland ran along Motherwell's side of the River Clyde, crossing the South Calder Water near Bothwellhaugh. At this crossing a fort and bath house were erected, but the Roman presence in Scotland did not last much later than this. Motherwell's location in the Scottish Lowlands means that it would have been inhabited by the Britons. Motherwell's name reportedly comes from a well, the Lady Well, formerly dedicated to the Virgin Mary. The site of this well is now marked by a plaque on Ladywell Road. The name "Moderwelt" appears on a map of Lanarkshire made by Timothy Pont some time between 1583 and 1611 and printed in the Netherlands in around 1652.

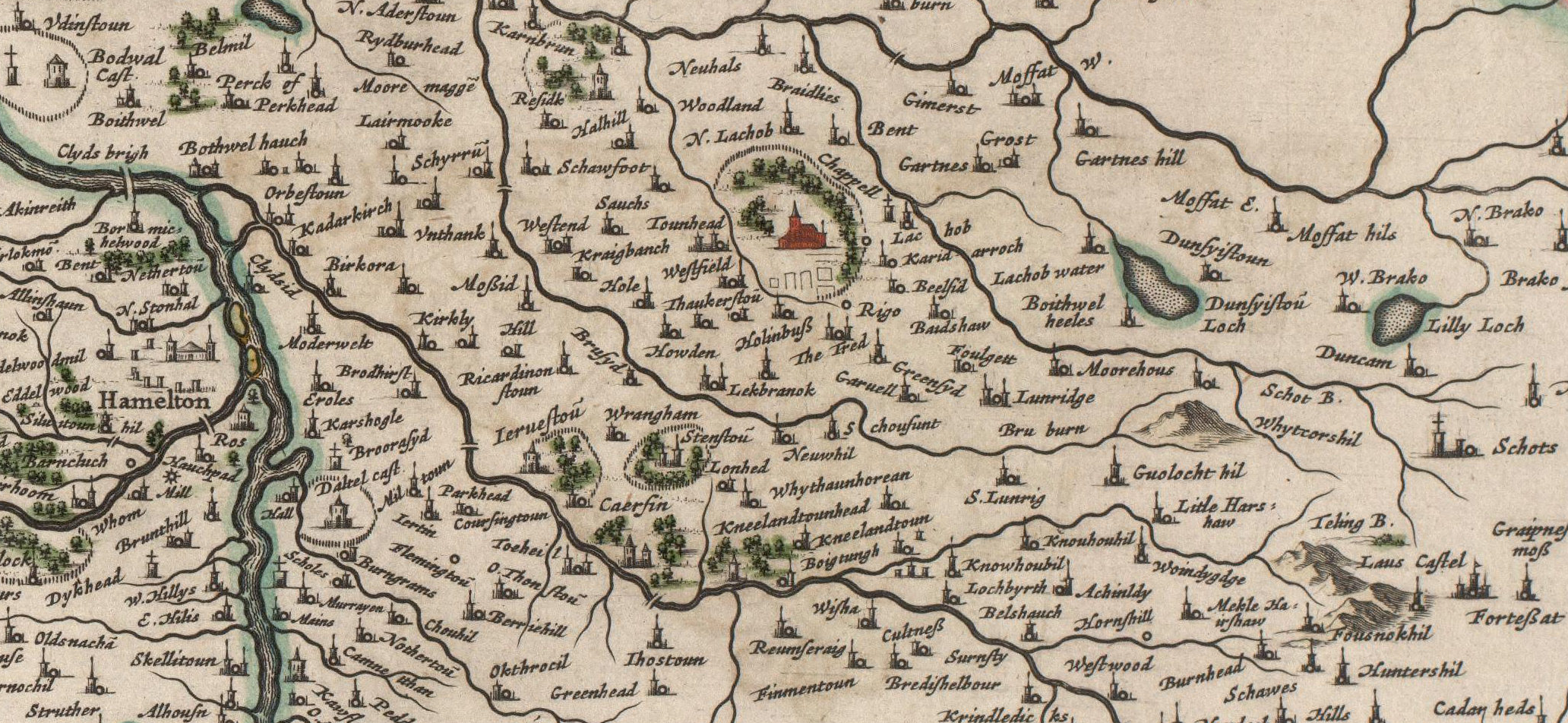
Blaeu's map based on Pont's original "Glasgow and the county of Lanark" map c.1596 depicting Moderwelt east of Hamelton, south of Clydsid and north of Dalzel Castle

By the start of the 19th century, Motherwell was a small hamlet, a farming community of some 600 people living adjacently to the 16th century laird's manor, Jerviston house. The hamlet remained reasonably small, reaching 1,700 people by 1841, and centred on the crossroads between the main road following the Clyde, and the road connecting Edinburgh with Hamilton and the west.

Motherwell's fortunes changed dramatically in the second half of the 19th century. With the coming of the railway in 1848, came industry and money. By 1881 David Colville had opened both an iron and steel works; Motherwell had a new piped water supply; had been granted burgh status and had its population swelled to 13,800 people.

By the end of the 19th century, Motherwell Town Hall and Dalziel High School had been built, the local football club had been founded, and its stadium, Fir Park, had been constructed.

At the start of the 20th century, Motherwell stood a large and growing industrial centre, a town of 37,000 people and a wide variety of heavy industries such as munitions, trams and bridge components. By the 1930s most of Scotland's steel production was in Motherwell, and owned by the Colville family. In 1959 the Colville family were persuaded by the government to begin work of a vast new steel works, which would become Ravenscraig. Within a few years, Ravenscraig was producing more than a million tonnes of steel per year. Following nationalisation of the steel industry, production at the plant was raised, with the Motherwell blast furnaces producing 3 million tonnes each year.

40 locals from Lanarkshire travelled to become volunteers of the International Brigades to fight for the Republican cause in the Spanish Civil War. The Spanish Civil War memorial in Duchess Park in Motherwell commemorates them.

By the middle of the 1970s, Motherwell's steel industry employed more than 13,000 people.

The 1980s brought a catastrophic collapse in the industry of Motherwell. The steel strike of 1980 lost British Steel Corporation important contracts and markets, followed by the closure of important local customers such as the Linwood car factory and Bathgate truck factory, Ravenscraig employed only 3,200 people by the end of the 1980s. Ravenscraig closed on 24 June 1992, and was demolished in July 1996, bringing 400 years of Scottish iron production to an end. Today the Dalzell Plate Mill is all that remains of Motherwell's industrial heritage, rolling steel from Middlesbrough into steel plates of various sizes.

By the start of the 21st century, Motherwell had begun to transform itself with the service industry thriving, the large scale unemployment of the previous twenty years had been largely remedied. Through the expansion of both towns, Motherwell and Wishaw are now effectively one continuous urban area, although the towns remain distinct.

The town served as the location for the Orange Order's Grand Orange Lodge of Scotland between 2021 and 2023.

== Culture ==
Motherwell hosted the National Mòd in 1983.

Strathclyde Park previously hosted the major Scottish music festival, T in the Park, until 1996, when it was moved to a disused airfield in Balado, Kinross-shire. The park also contains the ruins of a Roman bathhouse linked to the nearby site of Bothwellhaugh Roman Fort.

== Economy ==
Motherwell is the headquarters for both North Lanarkshire Council, which is one of Scotland's most populous local authority areas, and of Police Scotland "Q" division. These organisations cover an overall population of 327,000 people (59,000 in Motherwell and Wishaw) throughout the 183 square miles (470 km^{2}) of North Lanarkshire.

Motherwell was noted as the steel production capital of Scotland, nicknamed Steelopolis, home of David Colville & Sons during the 19th and 20th centuries, with its skyline later dominated by the water tower and three cooling towers of their Ravenscraig steelworks which closed in 1992. The Ravenscraig plant had one of the longest continuous casting, hot rolling, steel production facilities in the world before it was decommissioned. The closure of Ravenscraig signalled the end of large scale steel making in Scotland, although the town's Dalzell steel plate works continues to be operated by Tata Steel Europe.

In the past decade, Motherwell has to an extent recovered from the high unemployment and economic decline brought about by this collapse of heavy industry. A number of call centres and business parks such as Strathclyde Business Park have since set up in the region. Large employers include William Grant & Sons whisky distillers and the heavy equipment manufacturer Volvo Construction Equipment/Rokbak.

Motherwell has been a Fairtrade Town since January 2007.

== Transport ==
=== Railway ===
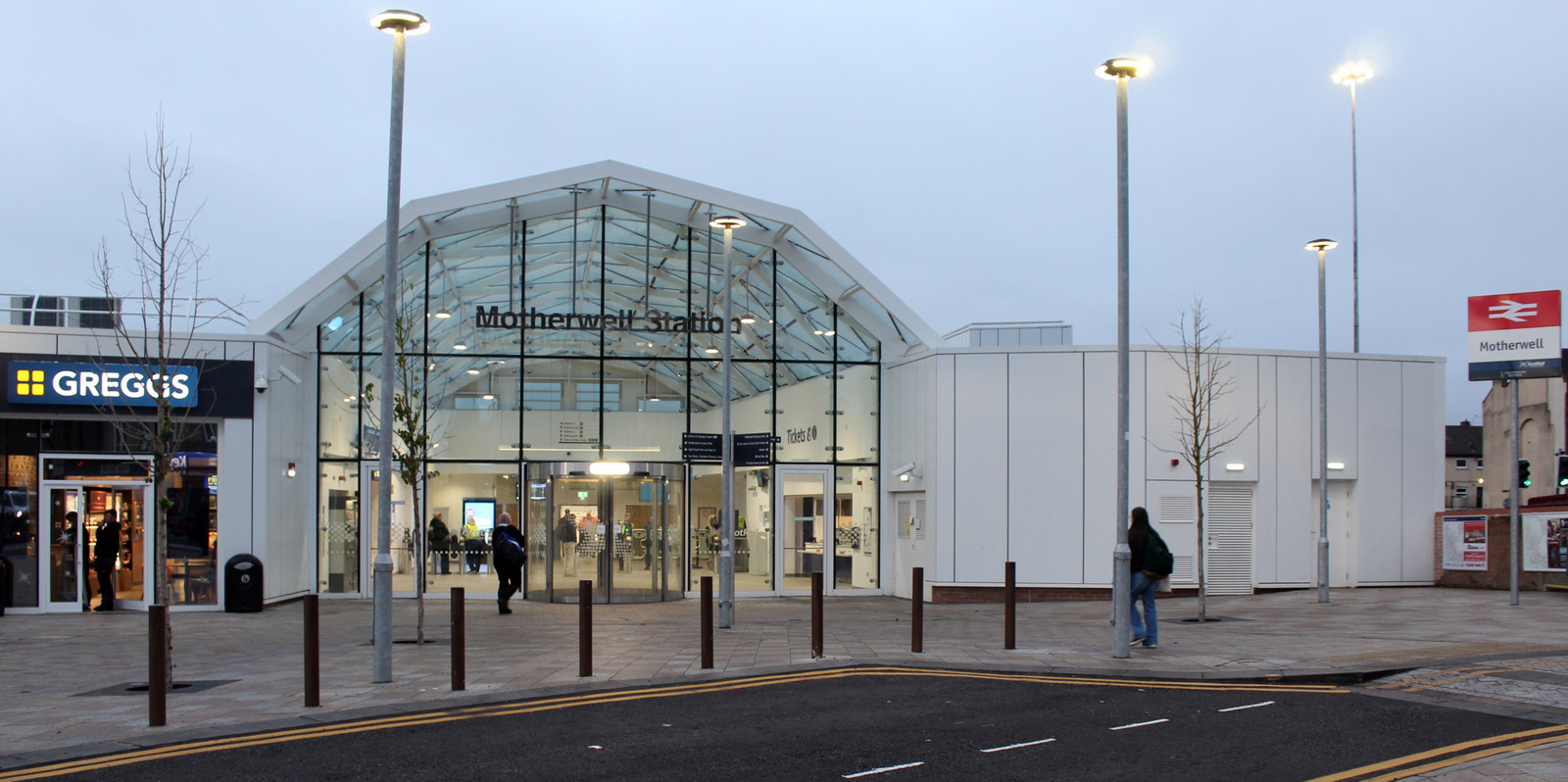
Motherwell railway station

The town has two stations, a main railway station (known simply as Motherwell), Airbles and Shieldmuir. The main station runs on the West Coast Main Line from Glasgow to London and on the East Coast Main Line via Edinburgh and Newcastle, and is located next to Motherwell Shopping Centre. National train operators; Avanti West Coast, CrossCountry and TransPennine Express, pass through the main station, but not all stop there. The station is also served by ScotRail who provide direct services to Carstairs, Coatbridge Central, Cumbernauld, Dalmuir, Edinburgh, Lanark, Milngavie and North Berwick. The smaller station in the Airbles suburb of Motherwell only runs on the line to Dalmuir via Glasgow Central low level and Hamilton Central; however, it is closer to the Civic Centre and Fir Park stadium than the main-line station. That station is served by ScotRail.

Formerly, Motherwell, Wishaw and Hamilton were served by the Lanarkshire Tramways (closed 1931), which were connected to the very large Glasgow electric tramway system (closed 1962) at both Cambuslang and Uddingston. At its maximum extent, the 200-mile system extended to Balloch, Milngavie, Airdrie, Larkhall, Clarkston, Barrhead, Kilbarchan and Renfrew, besides providing a dense network of lines offering pollution-free electric transport in the city centre.

The (now defunct) firm of Hurst Nelson was a major railway rolling stock manufacturer based in the town. The company built trains for the London Underground, and tramcars, as well as vehicles for main line railways.

=== Roads ===
Motherwell is very accessible by car, as it is right next to the M74 motorway beside the River Clyde. This road leads to Cumbria on the Anglo-Scottish border, where it becomes the M6. It is also about 3 miles (5 km) drive from the M8 motorway that links the two largest cities of Scotland, Glasgow and Edinburgh; the nearby A725 road, a dual carriageway with grade-separated junctions, connects the two motorways. Within the town, the primary routes are the A721 (roughly east-west between Wishaw and Bellshill) and the A723 (roughly north-south between Carfin / Newarthill and Hamilton), with a bypass formed by the B754 Airbles Road skirting the south of the town centre.

=== Bus ===
There are a number of different bus companies that travel through the town to various different locations. Bus operators serving Motherwell include First (Routes X11, X43, 201, 209, 211, 240, N240, 243, 242, 291, 293, and 266), JMB Travel (Routes 5, X5, 41, 41A, 42, and 42A), Stuarts Coaches (Route 240X, 366, 244 and 367), Whitelaws Coaches (Route 253), ARG Travel (Route 92 and 245), and PVT Transfer (Route 355).

Places that can be accessed by bus from Motherwell include:

- Wishaw
- Hamilton
- Bellshill
- East Kilbride
- Coatbridge
- Airdrie
- Glasgow
- Carluke
- Lanark
- Larkhall
- Law
- Shotts

The three acute hospitals in Lanarkshire can also be reached by bus from Motherwell:

- University Hospital Wishaw
- University Hospital Hairmyres
- University Hospital Monklands

=== Nearest airports ===
Since the M74 Extension has been completed, access to Glasgow Airport has become easier. The airport is approximately 16 miles (26 km) away from Motherwell. Edinburgh Airport is further away, at 31 miles (50 km), and can be reached by the M8.

== Places of interest ==
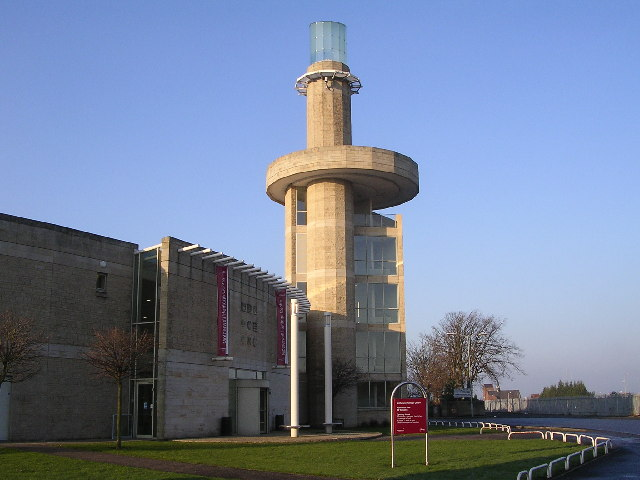
North Lanarkshire Heritage Centre

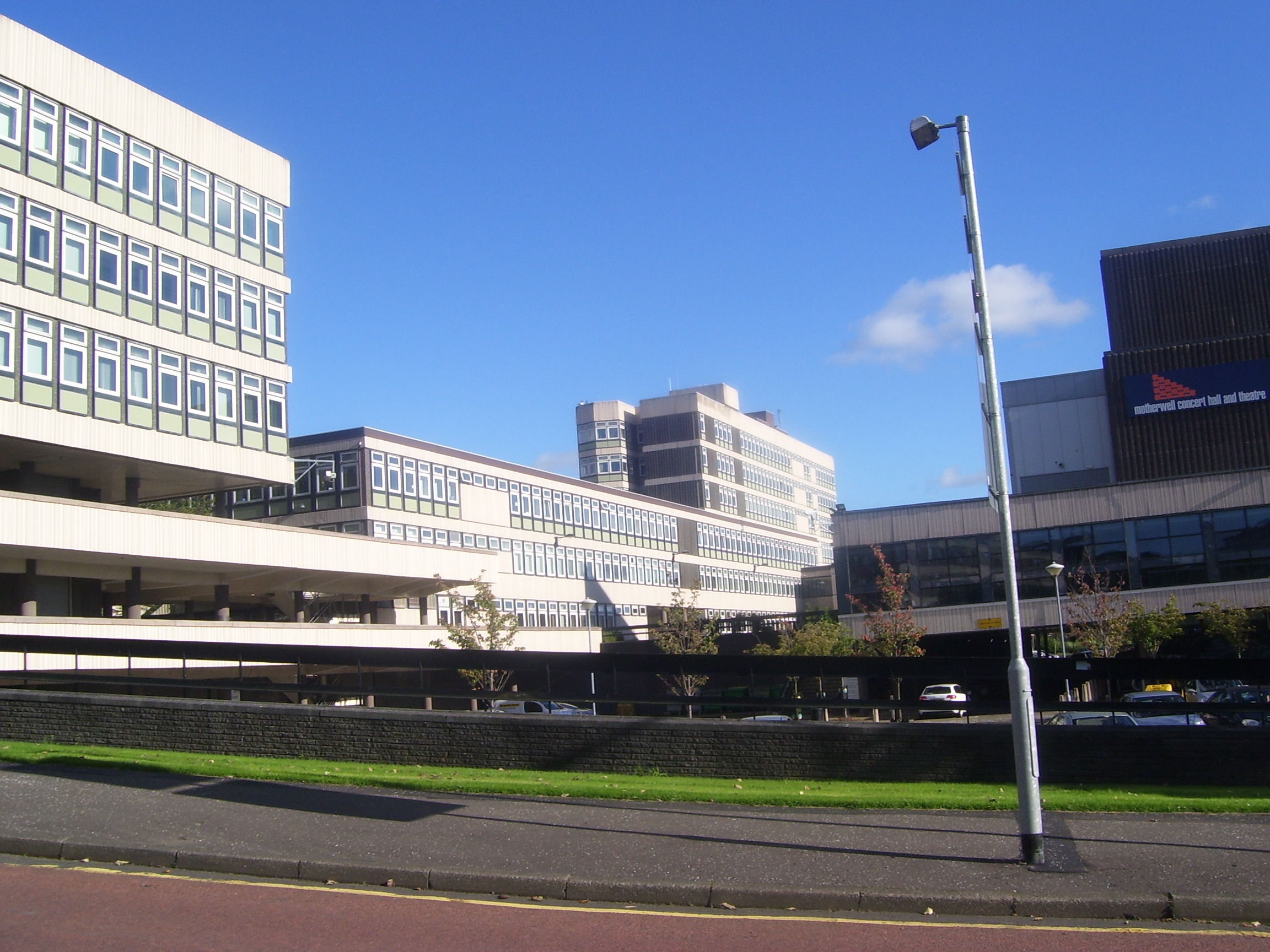
Motherwell Civic Centre

As well as the town's Country Park, The North Lanarkshire Heritage Centre, formerly the Motherwell Heritage Centre on High Road, situated next to the town's railway station, is a building that displays the history of Motherwell from the Roman era. The building also has a viewing tower on the fifth floor, giving visitors a good view of the town and other parts of Lanarkshire, as well as of mountains as far back as Ben Lomond.

Motherwell Civic Centre is the headquarters of North Lanarkshire Council (since 1996, previously the offices of Motherwell District Council within the Strathclyde region since 1975). A number of pantomimes and musicals have taken place in the concert hall and theatre within the complex. As well as this, top-level snooker (the Scottish Masters event) was also held there.

The Dalzell House is a building that is situated to the south of the town, right on the banks of the River Clyde. This house is protected as a Category-A listed building.

One of the main attractions in Motherwell is the M & D's Amusement Park, which is situated next to Strathclyde Loch in Strathclyde Park.

=== Motherwell Cathedral ===
The Cathedral Church of Our Lady of Good Aid, popularly known as Motherwell Cathedral, is a Roman Catholic cathedral which is the Mother Church of the Roman Catholic Diocese of Motherwell. It is the seat of the Bishop of Motherwell and its current bishop is Joseph Toal. The cathedral is open to the public most days. It is used as a venue for performances of the Motherwell Diocesan Choir.

== Education ==
=== Primary schools ===
The following primary schools are located in Motherwell:

- Cathedral Primary School
- Glencairn Primary School
- Knowetop Primary School
- Ladywell Primary School
- Logans Primary School
- Muirhouse Primary School
- Muir Street Primary School
- St. Bernadette's Primary School
- St Brendan's Primary School
- Firpark Primary School

=== Secondary schools ===
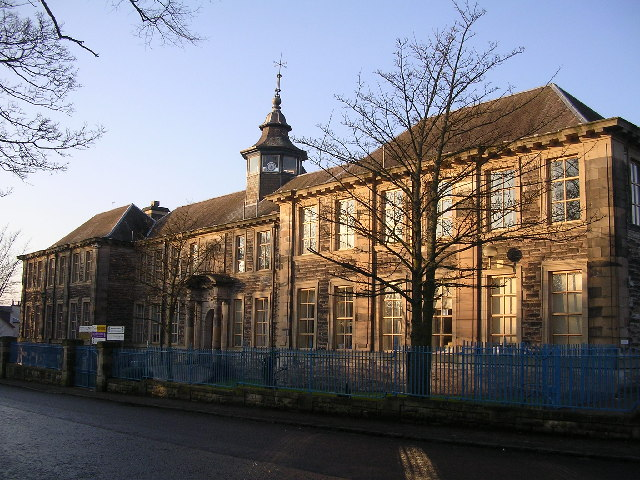
Dalziel High School

Dalziel High School is located on Crawford Street near Duchess park, serving areas including North Motherwell, The Globe, Greenacres, Airbles and North Lodge. and has a school roll of around 1,000 pupils. Notable alumni of Dalziel include former Motherwell, Wigan and Rangers player Lee McCulloch and international television journalist, Alan Fisher.

Another High School on Fir Park Street, Firpark High School which is Right next to Motherwell Football Club stadium, Fir park and has a Primary school attached to the high School and it is all named after the Football team right beside the High School (Fir Park Stadium).

Braidhurst High School, in the Forgewood area of Motherwell, serves areas including Forgewood, North Motherwell, The Globe and Jerviston. With a roll of around 500, Braidhurst is one of the smaller secondary schools in Lanarkshire. The main school building was recently modernised, with the outdated pink and yellow panels replaced by a modern-looking glass exterior. Notable alumni of Braidhurst include Elaine C Smith (actress), former Scotland national football captain Gary McAllister and Tam Cowan (comedian and writer).

Our Lady's High School is a Roman Catholic secondary located in Dalzell Drive, near Fir Park Stadium in Knowetop, the school serves areas including Knowetop, North Lodge, Airbles, Glencairn and Muirhouse. At one point it was the largest school in Western Europe, but the current school roll is around 700. Notable alumni of Our Lady's include Manchester City footballer and Manchester United manager Sir Matt Busby, Celtic F.C. footballer Billy McNeill, Derby County footballer Stephen Pearson, Celtic F.C. footballer Kieran Tierney and Motherwell F.C. footballer Chris Cadden.

Other secondary schools in the Motherwell area (though outside the boundaries of the town itself) include Brannock High School in Newarthill, Taylor R.C. High School in New Stevenston and Clyde Valley High School in Overtown. The nearest private school is Hamilton College in Hamilton, South Lanarkshire.

Another former pupil of Garrion Academy, (later Clyde Valley High School), Deborah Orr, became an award winning journalist in London & was married for a time to Will Self. Her personal memoir "Motherwell" 2020 by Weidenfeld & Nicolson ISBN 978 1 4746 1146 6, gives a clear eyed description of the town as she knew it from the 1960s onwards.

=== Further education ===
There is a Further Education college in Motherwell, known as New College Lanarkshire. This was located next to Our Lady's High School in Dalzell Drive, though in 2009 relocated to Ravenscraig, about 1 km away from its former site. The current roll of students at the new building is approximately 20,000 students.

The former site at Barons Grange is now being regenerated into a modern housing area.

== Sport ==
=== Football ===
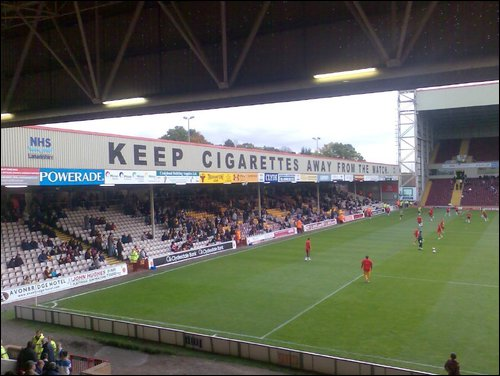
The East Stand at Fir Park Stadium, home of Motherwell Football Club

Motherwell Football Club was established in 1886. Known as the "Steelmen" because of the history of steel making in the area, they play in the Scottish Premiership from their home ground at Fir Park Stadium. Like many smaller clubs in the area, Motherwell struggle to attract a large fanbase due to the attraction of Glasgow's "Old Firm": Rangers and Celtic. The team attracts a regular home support of between five and six thousand fans. Motherwell is one of the most established clubs in the top division of the Scottish football league system, having been in the top flight continuously since the mid-80s. Again, due to the Old Firm's dominance of Scottish football, Motherwell's list of honours is somewhat modest. The club's last major trophy was the 1990–91 Scottish Cup, when they beat Dundee United 4–3 in the final. Motherwell have qualified for European football several times in recent seasons, usually competing in the qualifying rounds of the UEFA Europa League. It has been reported that the famous Viking Thunder Clap originated from Motherwell F.C. and was passed onto Icelandic football club Stjarnan when they played them in a Europa League game in 2014.

=== Speedway ===
Motherwell hosted motorcycle speedway racing at two venues. In 1930 and 1932 racing took place at Airbles Road which would soon be called the Clyde Valley Greyhound Track and the 1930 speedway venture was known as Paragon Speedway. The venture was run by a group of riders who were regulars at White City in Glasgow and known collectively as The Blantyre Crowd.

Speedway returned to the town in 1950 at the then newly constructed Parkneuk Sports Stadium in Milton Street. The Lanarkshire Eagles staged open meetings from July to September 1950. In 1951 the Eagles started out in the National League Second Division with veteran ex-Glasgow Tigers Will Lowther and Joe Crowther in the line up. They operated until the end of the 1954 season.

The top man was Derrick Close, signed from the Newcastle Diamonds in 1951, and he was supported by Gordon McGregor who was a founder Eagle. Eagles also featured Aussies Keith Gurtner and Ron Phillips who moved over when Ashfield left the League. Popular Australian Noel Watson was killed in his home country in 1953. However, due to his "never say die" approach, the fans' favourite was Bluey (Eric) Scott, who joined the Eagles in 1951. The pioneer Eagles featured Bill Baird from Forth who became the only rider to ride for all four Scottish teams.

Tommy Miller, one of the top Scottish speedway stars of the day, joined the Eagles in 1954 but moved on to the Coventry Bees mid-season. A short season in 1958 under former Glasgow Tigers promoter Ian Hoskins saw the end of the events at The Stadium but a short lived Long Track venture and a small speedway track staged four events – three on the long track and one on the short track – in 1972.

Derrick Close represented Lanarkshire Eagles and England in the 1952 Speedway World Championship Final. He was the third Scottish based rider to achieve this feat after Ken Le Breton (Ashfield Giants and Australia) in 1949 and Jack Young (Edinburgh Monarchs and Australia) in 1950 and 1951.

=== Greyhound racing ===
Motherwell had two greyhound tracks in the town. The first opened in 1932 and was called the Clyde Valley Greyhound Track, it was located on Airbles Road and closed in 1959. The second was the Parkneuk Sports Stadium near Milton Street and was opened in 1949 but closed in 1972.

=== Rugby union ===
Dalziel Rugby Club play at Dalziel Park (formerly Cleland Estate) between the villages of Carfin and Cleland (both near Motherwell).

=== Cycling ===
There are cycle routes based in Motherwell and in neighboring Strathclyde Country Park. The Greenlink Cycle Path is a cycle path that acts as a direct route from Strathclyde Park to Motherwell Town Centre. The path was formed in 2005 and may expand into Ravenscraig in the future.

=== Golf ===
Motherwell has a golf course based within the town, the Colville Park Golf Club, based at Jerviston Estate, on the former site of Jerviston House (the ruins are still visible in the grounds). A second golf course is located at the Dalziel Park Hotel and Golf Club.

Torrance Park Golf Club is a third located in Newarthill.

=== Hockey ===
The Motherwell Hockey Club and Dalziel High School Former Pupils (D.H.S.F.P) Ladies Hockey Club are field hockey clubs based at the astroturf hockey pitches in Dalziel Park.

=== Athletics ===
Athletics is a popular sport in Motherwell, as the town has a number of athletics clubs in different locations. The main club, Motherwell Athletics Club, is based at the Boathouse Gym at Strathclyde Country Park. In recent years there have been top class sports facilities built just outside the town, first Dalziel Park and most recently Ravenscraig Sports Centre, with the latter containing a top-class indoor athletics track. The sports facility in the new town of Ravenscraig hosts athletic events and was one of the main venues for the 2011 International Children's Games.

== Strathclyde Park ==
=== Recreation ===
Strathclyde Country Park contains many sport and leisure facilities and also has sites for bird-watchers and anglers. As well as the M&D's theme park, there are woodland and grass areas that are popular for picnicking and walks. Excavations in the park have revealed a site of archaeological interest including a Roman mosaic, Roman bath house and bridge (currently closed for health and safety reasons). The park is on the site of the former mining village, Bothwellhaugh, and much of the town was submerged after it was abandoned.

=== Major events ===
The park was a venue for the 2014 Commonwealth Games and the 2011 International Children's Games. It hosted the triathlon event in both. It was previously a venue for the rowing events at the 1986 Commonwealth Games.

== Town twinning ==
Motherwell is twinned with:

- Schweinfurt, Germany
- Motherwell, Eastern Cape, South Africa

== Notable people ==
- Iain Bonomy, Lord Bonomy (born 1946) – Senator of the College of Justice, attended Dalziel High
- William Clamp (1892–1917)– recipient of the Victoria Cross
- Davie Colquhoun (1906–1983) - Scottish professional footballer
- Jim Conacher – retired ice hockey player who played 324 NHL games for the Chicago Blackhawks, Detroit Red Wings, and New York Rangers
- Tam Cowan – football journalist and radio presenter
- Gordon Dalziel – former footballer and manager, formerly of Raith Rovers
- The Delgados – former indie rock band from Motherwell
- Alan Fisher – broadcast journalist working for international news channel, Al Jazeera English
- Tommy Gemmell – former footballer, formerly of Celtic and best known as one of the Lisbon Lions
- Alexander Gibson – Principal Conductor of the Royal Scottish National Orchestra (1959–1984)
- Paul Higgins – actor, best known as Jamie MacDonald in The Thick of It and In the Loop
- Hamish Imlach – folk singer; lived in Muirhouse, Motherwell
- Margaret Jarvie – swimmer and counsellor
- Graeme Kelling – original guitarist of Deacon Blue (1957–2004)
- The LaFontaines – band founded by Kerr Okan, Darren McCaughey, Jamie Keenan, Anna Smith and Iain Findlay
- Scott Leitch – former footballer, formerly of Motherwell
- Katie Leung – stage and screen actress whose roles include the Harry Potter film series and the BBC miniseries One Child
- Eddie Linden – poet and magazine editor, born in Motherwell.
- Mark Meechan – Scottish YouTuber
- Ethel MacDonald – anarchist who was active in Barcelona during the Spanish Civil War
- Walton Newbold (8 May 1888 – 20 February 1943) – first Communist Party MP to be elected in the United Kingdom
- Alison O'Donnell - actor
- Deborah Orr – journalist
- Anum Qaisar – Member of Parliament for Airdrie and Shotts
- Nan Rae – former swimmer; competed at the 1960 Summer Olympics
- Douglas Miller Reid (1897–1959) – teacher at Harrow School and noted botanical author
- Ian St. John – former Scottish international footballer, formerly of Motherwell and Liverpool
- Anne Sharp – opera singer
- Andy Thomson – former footballer, formerly of Queen of the South
- Kieran Tierney – Scottish international footballer with Celtic and Arsenal
- Doogie White – rock vocalist, singer for Rainbow, Michael Schenker Group and other bands
