= Dalziel High School =

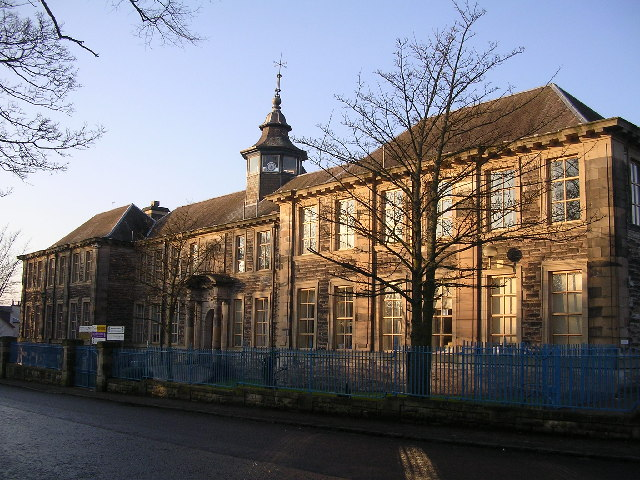

Location
- Crawford Street; Motherwell, North Lanarkshire, ML1 3AG; Scotland; 55.7866°N 4.0000°W

Information
- Type: Secondary
- Motto: Summa Petenda
- Opened: 1898
- Status: open
- School district: North Lanarkshire Council
- Head teacher: Jaclyn Martin
- Staff: 101 (2025)
- Gender: Coeducational
- Age: 11 to 18
- Enrollment: 1,020 (2025)
- Houses: 3 Barclay, Colville, Greig
- Colours: Royal blue, black, white
- Nickname: Dalzielians
- Yearbook: Dalzielian
- Website: www.dalzielhigh.org.uk

Dalziel High School (/diˈɛl/ dee-EL) is a non-denominational secondary school in Motherwell, North Lanarkshire, Scotland.

== Overview ==
James K. Scobbie, Rector from 1957 until 1974, greatly enhanced the school's performance during his tenure. Since then, the school has received some of the best reports of any school in Scotland. The school was one of the first in the country to be awarded Charter Mark status (now Customer Service Excellence), as well as being awarded the National Award For Excellence for Work and Enterprise. On 11 November 2008, the secondary school was voted as the best in Scotland in a report by HMIe. Dalziel was also successful in winning the Customer Service Excellence award with no partial compliances and the highest standard of compliance plus, one of only a few schools in the United Kingdom to win this award.

The school motto is Summa Petenda (Aim for the highest).

The school has a specialised hearing impaired department, which caters to severely hearing impaired pupils from Lanarkshire and beyond.

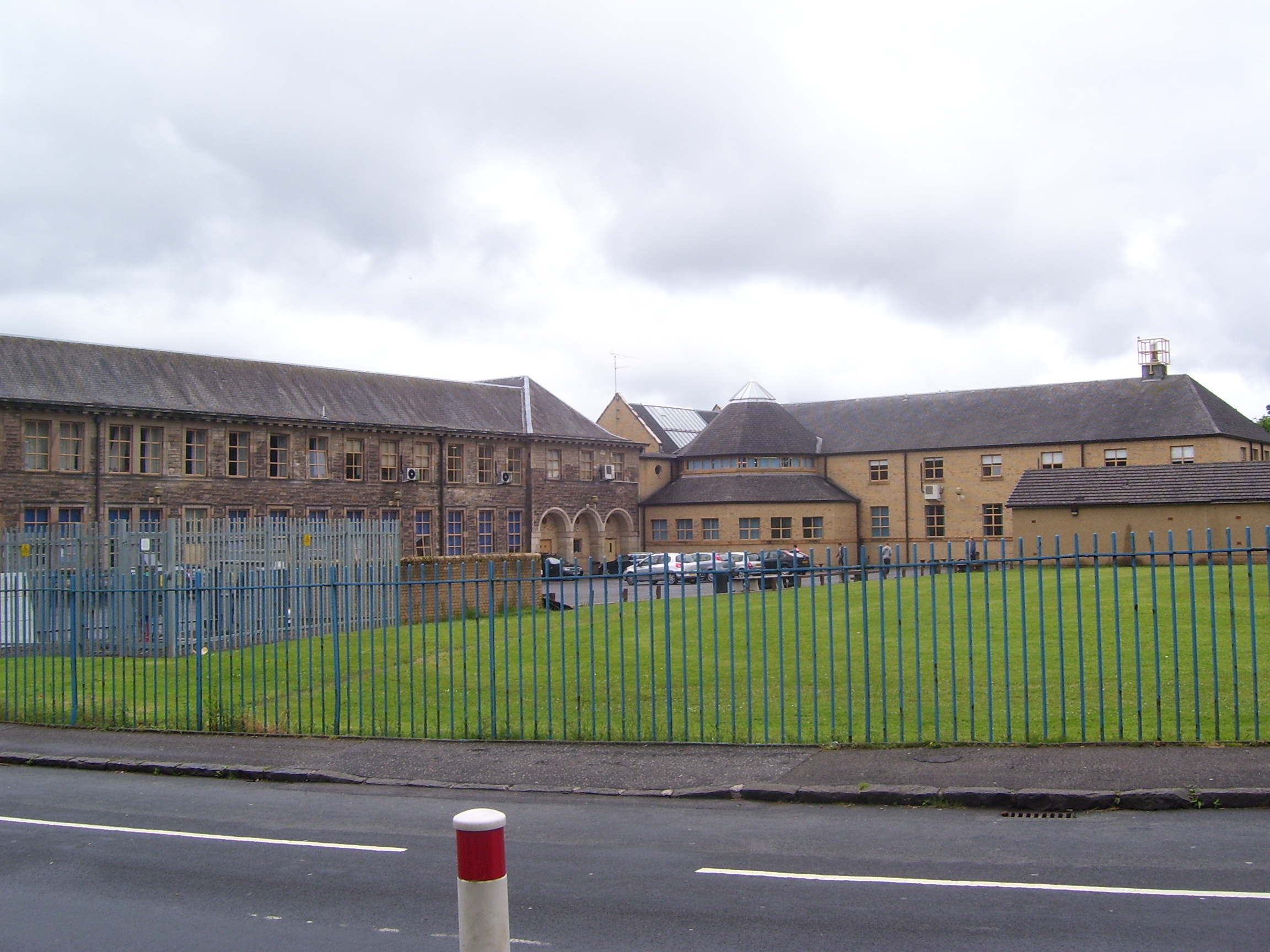
The modern building is attached to the old 1898 building.

== Feeder schools ==
The school's feeder schools include Glencairn Primary School, Knowetop Primary School and Ladywell Primary School. Pupils from other schools near to Dalziel, such as Logans Primary School, are usually transferred to Braidhurst High School.

== Sports ==
Dalziel High School has its own playing fields, located at Dalziel Park, between the villages of Cleland and Carfin. The fields were proposed by the school's War Memorial Trust, and was to act as a permanent tribute to all the former pupils who died in the First World War and the Second World War. The playing fields were established through the purchase of the 192 acres (0.78 km^{2}) Cleland Estate from the Colville family after the wars. Cleland Estate was also the venue for the annual Drama Festival. The estate was later redesigned to make it more compact and improve the quality of the pitches and this change was formalised when it was opened by the Princess Royal on 5 April 2001.

A handful of sports teams use these fields, some of which include the rugby club Dalziel (a club which was, for a number years, only for former pupils of the school), and the local SPL football team Motherwell, as well as a number of local athletics, tennis and hockey clubs. The Dalziel Park playing fields are regarded as one of the best in the country.

In February 2012, Dalziel was made a community sports hub.

== Notable alumni ==
- Iain Bonomy, Lord Bonomy, Senator of the College of Justice 1997–2012, Judge of the International Criminal Tribunal for the former Yugoslavia 2004–09
- Alan Fisher, broadcast journalist and war correspondent
- Allan Gentleman, swimmer
- Alexander Gibson (1926–1995), conductor
- Liz Lochhead, poet, playwright and broadcaster
- Sandy McNaughton, footballer
- Nancy Riach, record holding and champion Scottish swimmer who died of polio at the age of 20
