= Lloyd Campbell-McBride =

Australian rugby union player (born 1982)

- Born: Lloyd Campbell-McBride; 27 March 1982 (age 44) Australia
- Height: 1.9 m (6 ft 3 in)
- Weight: 119 kg (18 st 10 lb)

Rugby union career
- Position: Loosehead Prop
Amateur team(s)
Years	Team	Apps	(Points)
- Easts
Senior career
Years	Team	Apps	(Points)
2005	Glasgow Warriors		
Provincial / State sides
Years	Team	Apps	(Points)
- East Coast Aces
Super Rugby
Years	Team	Apps	(Points)
- Queensland Reds

Lloyd Campbell-McBride (born 27 March 1982 in Australia) is a former rugby union player for Glasgow Warriors at the Loosehead Prop position.

He was signed by Glasgow Warriors by coach Hugh Campbell on a short-term deal lasting for four months. This was a short-term deal to cover injury to Glasgow's Ben Prescott.

He was signed from Queensland Reds and registered for Glasgow's Heineken Cup squad that year. The prop was Welsh-qualified.

Previously Campbell-McBride played his club rugby in Australia with Easts.

While he was with the Warriors he was involved in training the amateur club Ayr RFC in scrummaging.

Unfortunately the recurrence of a sternum injury meant that Campbell-McBride did not play for the Warriors. This was unfortunate both for the player and the club; it happened just before Glasgow's Heineken Cup trip to Bourgoin, France. The Warriors had only 25 players fit for the European match - and this included the academy players John Barclay and Stuart Corsar, who were named in the 23.

As a result of this injury Campbell-McBride's short-term contract wasn't extended and he returned to Australia to play again with the Queensland Country side East Coast Aces. He then moved to Easts.
