= Motherwell Shopping Centre =

Coordinates: 55°47′22″N 3°59′27″W

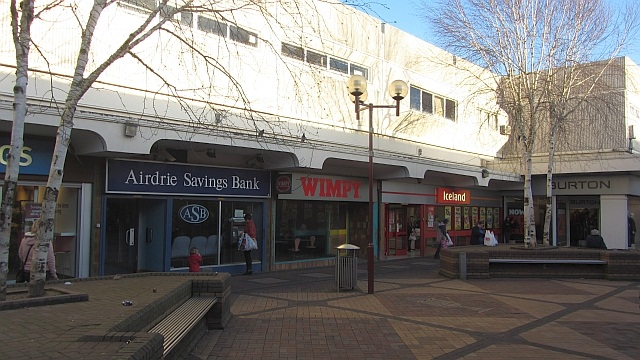
- Formerly Brandon Parade Central, the cup carved on the ground commemorates Motherwell's 1991 Scottish Cup Final win.
- Location: Motherwell, Scotland, UK
- Owner: Chester Properties and Columbus Capital (joint-ownership)
- Num. of stores: 85+ (estimate)
- Floor area: 350,000 m²
- Parking: 600 spaces
- Website: motherwellshoppingcentre.co.uk

Motherwell Shopping Centre is an outdoor shopping centre located in the centre of Motherwell, Scotland. It is owned jointly by Chester Properties and Columbus Capital, who purchased the site from previous owners CALA Properties in May 2010. The centre is known locally as Motherwell Town Centre.

== History and formation ==
Formerly the section of Brandon Street connecting to Motherwell Point in the post-war era, this section would later separate and be transformed into a pedestrianised street, leading to the creation of Brandon Parade. The new end of Brandon Street would later connect to a by-pass road known as Menteith Road. Plan The centre was later renamed Brandon Shopping Centre after CALA Properties purchased the centre. Due to the transition, many famous nationwide retailers, such as Primark, now have a store in the centre, making it one of the most attractive and well-known shopping centres in North Lanarkshire. In October 2013, the centre was given a radical upgrade, and was renamed Motherwell Shopping Centre upon completion.

== Location and transport links ==
The shopping centre is located close to Motherwell railway station, with access to services on routes including the West Coast Main Line, East Coast Main Line, Cross Country and Argyle Line providing local and longer-distance services, from Glasgow, Edinburgh, stretching out to as far as London and Penzance. It also has numerous bus stops located at Merry Street, Muir Street and West Hamilton Street, as well as a taxi rank at the North of the centre next to the public toilets.

== Stores ==
Stores include: B&M, Bonmarché, Boots, British Heart Foundation, Card Factory, Iceland, JD Sports, Poundland, The Works.

== See also ==
- List of shopping centres in the United Kingdom
