= Mike Roberts (rugby union, born 1982) =

- Born: Michael Roberts; 14 October 1982 (age 44) Liverpool, England
- Height: 1.91 m (6 ft 3 in)
- Weight: 99 kg (15 st 8 lb)
- School: St Edward's College

Rugby union career
- Position: Wing
Senior career
Years	Team	Apps	(Points)
2004-2005	Wasps	5	(25)
2005-2007	Glasgow Warriors	15	(30)
2008-2009	Connacht	3	(0)
International career
Years	Team	Apps	(Points)
- England U18

Mike Roberts (born 14 November 1982) is a former rugby union Wing.

== Honours ==
London Wasps

- Guinness Premiership (3): 2002-03, 2003-04, 2004-05
- Heineken Cup (1): 2003-04
- Anglo-Welsh Cup (1):
