= Sean Lineen =

Scotland international rugby union player

- Born: Sean Raymond Patrick Lineen; 25 December 1961 (age 64) Auckland, New Zealand
- Notable relative: Terry Lineen (father)

Rugby union career
- Position: Centre
Amateur team(s)
Years	Team	Apps	(Points)
- Pontypool
–	Boroughmuir		
Provincial / State sides
Years	Team	Apps	(Points)
- Edinburgh District
-	Blues Trial		
International career
Years	Team	Apps	(Points)
1989–92	Scotland	29	(8)
Coaching career
- Years: Team
- -: Boroughmuir
- 2003-06: Glasgow Warriors (Asst.)
- 2006–12: Glasgow Warriors
- 2013–15: Scotland U20
- 2015–: Scottish Rugby
- 2015–16: London Scottish

Sean Lineen (born 25 December 1961) is a former Scotland international rugby union player. He was a former head coach of Glasgow Warriors from 2006 to 2012. He was a director for the Scottish Rugby Union until December 2021.

== Rugby Union career ==
=== Amateur career ===
Lineen played as a Centre.

Originally from New Zealand, in the 1985–86 season he made his first journey to the UK, playing for Pontypool in Wales. In October 1988 he came to Scotland and played for Boroughmuir.

=== Provincial career ===
He played for Edinburgh District.

He has been awarded the freedom of the city of Edinburgh.

He played for the Blues Trial side against the Reds Trial side on 6 January 1990. The Blues won the match 45 - 4.

=== International career ===
He qualified to play for Scotland through his grandfather and made his international debut on 21 January 1989 against Wales at Murrayfield aged 27.

Lineen played at 29 times for Scotland, He was a member of the notable Scottish Grand Slam team of 1990.

=== Coaching career ===
After his playing career ended, Lineen became a coach at Boroughmuir and during his time there he guided the side to cup and league triumphs. From this, Lineen was appointed assistant coach at Glasgow Warriors for the start of the 2003–04 season. He later became a member of the Scotland national coaching team under Frank Hadden in the summer of 2005, coaching the backs.

A previous player for Edinburgh District, Lineen had applied to be head coach of Edinburgh Rugby but the SRU insisted that the new coach of Edinburgh must already have experience as head coach.

However, with Hugh Campbell stepping down as head coach of the Glasgow Warriors in 2006, Lineen was ideally placed as the assistant coach to then make the step up. On 28 March 2006 he was appointed head coach of Glasgow Warriors. He was coach of the Warriors for 6 years and started laying the foundation of the side that Gregor Townsend would later build on.

After coaching the Warriors, Lineen then coached the Scotland Under 20 side; and then moved on to coach London Scottish.

=== Administrative career ===
He was made a head of International Age-Grade Rugby at the Scottish Rugby Union.

In 2016 he was made a director of rugby at London Scottish.

He is now the head of player acquisition at the Scottish Rugby Union.

He is now retired.

== Business career ==
He ran the Scottish Rugby magazine while coaching with Boroughmuir.

== Family ==
He is the son of rugby player Terry Lineen.
