= Hugh Campbell (rugby union) =

Scottish rugby union player

- Born: Hugh Campbell Scotland

Rugby union career
- Position: Prop
Amateur team(s)
Years	Team	Apps	(Points)
-	Jordanhill		
Provincial / State sides
Years	Team	Apps	(Points)
-	Glasgow District		
International career
Years	Team	Apps	(Points)
1978-82	Scotland B	2	
Coaching career
- Years: Team
- Glasgow District
- 1998-2003: Scotland A
- 2003-2006: Glasgow Warriors

Hugh Campbell (born in Scotland) is a former head coach of the Glasgow Warriors.

== Playing career ==
=== Amateur career ===
Campbell played Jordanhill as a prop.

=== Provincial career ===
He represented the Glasgow District side.

=== International career ===
Campbell was capped at Scotland B level.

== Coaching career ==
Campbell coached the Glasgow District side when they were still an amateur district.

Campbell was previously the head coach of Scotland A and the scrummage and line out coach with the senior Scotland side.

He took over the professional district side Glasgow Warriors, then Glasgow Rugby, from New Zealander Kiwi Searancke in April 2003 (although previous coach Richie Dixon did stand in for a few weeks as caretaker between Searancke leaving and Campbell arriving). As part of the coaching set-up Sean Lineen joined him as assistant coach and Shade Munro became a development coach.

Campbell initially got the Glasgow side back to playing rugby the players enjoyed. Glasgow started the 2003-04 season with a confident win over Cardiff Blues. They were however very inconsistent and Glasgow finished 2nd bottom of the table sandwiched by Edinburgh above and the Border Reivers below.

The 2004-05 season saw Glasgow in 7th place in the table and was the best showing from a Scottish side that season. However that season's mid table push was the best in Campbell's reign in charge.

The Glasgow Rugby side finally rebranded itself as Glasgow Warriors in 2005.

The 2004-05 impetus gradually disappeared from the Warriors the following season and they managed just 4 wins in the Celtic League in 2005-06. Attendances dropped with the erratic performances and the number of players selected for Scotland international duty also fell. Finally the chief executive of the SRU Gordon McKie stepped in to resolve the situation.

Campbell was replaced as Warriors boss by his assistant Sean Lineen on 28 March 2006. With the season almost over Lineen could do little to stop the Warriors finishing bottom of the Magners League.
