= 2013–14 Glasgow Warriors season =

Glasgow Warriors 2013 / 2014
- Ground: Scotstoun Stadium (Capacity: 10,000)
- Coach: (Scotland) Gregor Townsend
- Captain: (Scotland) Alastair Kellock
- Most caps: (Scotland) Rob Harley (28)
- Top scorer: (Scotland) Finn Russell (101)
- Most tries: (Fiji) Nikola Matawalu (8)
- League: Pro 12
- 2nd (Runners Up)
| 1st kit | 2nd kit |

The 2013–14 season saw Glasgow Warriors compete in the competitions: the RaboDirect Pro12 and the European Champions Cup, the Heineken Cup.

== Season Overview ==
Glasgow Warriors hoped that this year they would improve on last season's defeat in the semi-final play-off when they finished 3rd in the Pro12 league.

Al Kellock was named as captain again for the eighth season in a row.

A row over the future of the Heineken Cup overshadowed the start of the season. In fact, this was to be the last year of the Heineken Cup in its present format and it was replaced by the European Rugby Champions Cup.

== Team ==
=== Coaches ===
- Head coach: (Scotland) Gregor Townsend
- Assistant coach: (Scotland) Shade Munro
- Assistant coach: (Scotland) Matt Taylor
- Assistant coach: (Scotland) Kenny Murray

=== Squad ===
| Hookers (Scotland) Fraser Brown (Scotland) Kevin Bryce (Scotland) Finlay Gillies (Scotland) Dougie Hall (Scotland) Pat MacArthur Props (Scotland) Geoff Cross (England) Michael Cusack (Scotland) Ryan Grant (Scotland) Ed Kalman (Scotland) Moray Low (Zimbabwe) Denford Mutamangira (Scotland) Gordon Reid (Scotland) Jon Welsh (Fiji) Jerry Yanuyanutawa Locks (Scotland) Jonny Gray (Scotland) Alastair Kellock (Fiji) Leone Nakarawa (Scotland) Tom Ryder (Scotland) Tim Swinson | Loose forwards (Scotland) Adam Ashe (Scotland) James Eddie (Scotland) Chris Fusaro (Scotland) Rob Harley (South Africa) Tyrone Holmes (Scotland) Callum Reid (South Africa) Josh Strauss (Scotland) Ryan Wilson Half backs (Scotland) Chris Cusiter (Scotland) Peter Jericevich (Fiji) Nikola Matawalu (Scotland) Henry Pyrgos Stand offs (Scotland) Ruaridh Jackson (Scotland) Duncan Weir (Scotland) Scott Wight | Centres (Scotland) Mark Bennett (United States) Folau Niua (Scotland) Alex Dunbar (Scotland) Robbie Fergusson (Scotland) Peter Horne (Scotland) Richie Vernon; Back Three (Argentina) Gabriel Ascárate (United States) Carlin Isles (Scotland) Lee Jones (Scotland) Sean Lamont (Scotland) Sean Maitland (Canada) D. T. H. van der Merwe (Scotland) Tommy Seymour (Scotland) Stuart Hogg (Scotland) Peter Murchie |

=== Academy players ===
- (Scotland) Fergus Scott - Hooker
- (Scotland) George Hunter - Prop
- (Scotland) D'Arcy Rae - Prop
- (Scotland) Andy Redmayne - Lock
- (Scotland) Will Bordill - Flanker
- (Scotland) Ali Price - Scrum-half
- (Scotland) Gavin Lowe - Fly-half
- (Scotland) Finn Russell - Fly-half
- (Scotland) Jack Steele - Centre
- (Scotland) Rory Hughes - Wing

== Player statistics ==
During the 2013–14 season, Glasgow have used forty six different players in competitive games. The table below shows the number of appearances and points scored by each player.

| Position | Nation | Name | Pro12 | | | Champions Cup | | | Total | |
| Position | Nation | Name | Apps (sub) | Tries | Points kicked | Apps (sub) | Tries | Points kicked | Apps (sub) | Total pts |
|---|---|---|---|---|---|---|---|---|---|---|
| HK | (Scotland) | Fraser Brown | 0(10) | 0 | 0 | 0 | 0 | 0 | 0(10) | 0 |
| HK | (Scotland) | Kevin Bryce | 0(2) | 0 | 0 | 0 | 0 | 0 | 0(2) | 0 |
| HK | (Scotland) | Dougie Hall | 10(9) | 1 | 0 | 3(3) | 0 | 0 | 13(12) | 5 |
| HK | (Scotland) | Pat MacArthur | 14(5) | 0 | 0 | 3(3) | 0 | 0 | 17(8) | 0 |
| PR | (Scotland) | Geoff Cross | 2(3) | 1 | 0 | 0 | 0 | 0 | 2(3) | 5 |
| PR | (England) | Mike Cusack | 1 | 0 | 0 | 0 | 0 | 0 | 1 | 0 |
| PR | (Scotland) | Ryan Grant | 9(3) | 2 | 0 | 6 | 1 | 0 | 15(3) | 15 |
| PR | (Scotland) | Ed Kalman | 7(2) | 0 | 0 | 2(4) | 0 | 0 | 9(6) | 0 |
| PR | (Scotland) | Moray Low | 3(10) | 0 | 0 | 2(2) | 0 | 0 | 5(12) | 0 |
| PR | (Scotland) | Gordon Reid | 13(6) | 2 | 0 | 0 | 0 | 0 | 13(6) | 10 |
| PR | (Scotland) | Jon Welsh | 11(9) | 0 | 0 | 2(2) | 0 | 0 | 13(11) | 0 |
| PR | (Fiji) | Jerry Yanuyanutawa | 2(12) | 1 | 0 | 0(2) | 0 | 0 | 2(14) | 5 |
| LK | (Scotland) | Jonny Gray | 15(3) | 1 | 0 | 1(1) | 1 | 0 | 16(4) | 10 |
| LK | (Scotland) | Alastair Kellock | 10(1) | 1 | 0 | 4 | 0 | 0 | 14(1) | 5 |
| LK | (Fiji) | Leone Nakarawa | 5(12) | 0 | 0 | 2(2) | 1 | 0 | 7(14) | 5 |
| LK | (Scotland) | Tom Ryder | 5(3) | 0 | 0 | 2(1) | 0 | 0 | 7(4) | 0 |
| LK | (Scotland) | Tim Swinson | 13(2) | 1 | 0 | 4 | 1 | 0 | 17(2) | 10 |
| BR | (Scotland) | Adam Ashe | 0(1) | 0 | 0 | 0 | 0 | 0 | 0(1) | 0 |
| BR | (Scotland) | James Eddie | 3(8) | 2 | 0 | 1(2) | 0 | 0 | 4(10) | 10 |
| BR | (Scotland) | Chris Fusaro | 14(4) | 1 | 0 | 4(1) | 1 | 0 | 18(5) | 10 |
| BR | (Scotland) | Rob Harley | 21(3) | 2 | 0 | 4 | 0 | 0 | 25(3) | 10 |
| BR | (Scotland) | Tyrone Holmes | 9(6) | 0 | 0 | 2(2) | 1 | 0 | 11(8) | 5 |
| BR | (South Africa) | Josh Strauss | 17(3) | 1 | 0 | 4(1) | 0 | 0 | 21(4) | 5 |
| BR | (Scotland) | Ryan Wilson | 4(3) | 1 | 0 | 2(2) | 0 | 0 | 6(5) | 5 |
| SH | (Scotland) | Chris Cusiter | 14(3) | 1 | 0 | 0(3) | 0 | 0 | 14(6) | 5 |
| SH | (Fiji) | Nikola Matawalu | 12(6) | 7 | 0 | 5(1) | 1 | 0 | 17(7) | 40 |
| SH | (Scotland) | Henry Pyrgos | 9(4) | 2 | 12 | 3 | 0 | 0 | 12(4) | 22 |
| FH | (Scotland) | Ruaridh Jackson | 10(10) | 1 | 22 | 5(1) | 0 | 21 | 15(11) | 48 |
| FH | (Scotland) | Finn Russell | 11(3) | 0 | 101 | 0 | 0 | 0 | 11(3) | 101 |
| FH | (Scotland) | Duncan Weir | 8(1) | 0 | 76 | 1(5) | 0 | 12 | 9(6) | 88 |
| FH | (Scotland) | Scott Wight | 2(2) | 0 | 6 | 0 | 0 | 0 | 2(2) | 6 |
| CE | (Scotland) | Mark Bennett | 15(3) | 4 | 12 | 1 | 0 | 0 | 16(3) | 32 |
| CE | (Scotland) | Alex Dunbar | 11 | 1 | 0 | 5 | 0 | 0 | 16 | 5 |
| CE | (Scotland) | Peter Horne | 4(2) | 0 | 0 | 0 | 0 | 0 | 4(2) | 0 |
| CE | (United States) | Folau Niua | 0(1) | 0 | 0 | 0 | 0 | 0 | 0(1) | 0 |
| CE | (Scotland) | Jack Steele | 0(1) | 0 | 0 | 0 | 0 | 0 | 0(1) | 0 |
| CE | (Scotland) | Richie Vernon | 9(8) | 2 | 0 | 0(3) | 0 | 0 | 9(11) | 10 |
| WG | (Scotland) | Rory Hughes | 2 | 0 | 0 | 0 | 0 | 0 | 2 | 0 |
| WG | (Scotland) | Lee Jones | 3(3) | 1 | 0 | 0 | 0 | 0 | 3(3) | 5 |
| WG | (Scotland) | Sean Lamont | 7(2) | 0 | 0 | 2 | 1 | 0 | 9(2) | 5 |
| WG | (Scotland) | Sean Maitland | 10(3) | 3 | 0 | 6 | 2 | 0 | 16(3) | 25 |
| WG | (Canada) | D. T. H. van der Merwe | 6(1) | 2 | 0 | 2(2) | 2 | 0 | 8(3) | 20 |
| WG | (Scotland) | Tommy Seymour | 14(1) | 6 | 0 | 3 | 0 | 0 | 17(1) | 30 |
| FB | (Argentina) | Gabriel Ascárate | 2(2) | 0 | 0 | 2 | 0 | 0 | 4(2) | 0 |
| FB | (Scotland) | Stuart Hogg | 7 | 3 | 11 | 4 | 0 | 5 | 11 | 31 |
| FB | (Scotland) | Peter Murchie | 10(1) | 2 | 0 | 0 | 0 | 0 | 10(1) | 10 |

== Staff movements ==
=== Coaches ===
==== Personnel in ====
- (Scotland) Kenny Murray from (Scotland) Ayr RFC

==== Personnel out ====
None

== Player movements ==
=== Academy promotions ===
- (Scotland) Johnny Gray

=== Player transfers ===
==== In ====
- (Scotland) Kevin Bryce from (Scotland) Heriot's Rugby Club
- (Scotland) Geoff Cross from (Scotland) Edinburgh Rugby(loan)
- (United States) Carlin Isles from (United States) Detroit Lions (NFL)
- (Argentina) Gabriel Ascárate from (France) US Carcassonne
- (United States) Folau Niua from (United States) USA 7s
- Leone Nakarawa from Fiji Barbarians
- (South Africa) Tyrone Holmes from (Italy) Petrarca Rugby
- (Zimbabwe) Denford Mutamangira from (Scotland) Ayr RFC
- (Scotland) Peter Jericevich from (Scotland) Edinburgh Academicals
- (Scotland) Callum Reid from (Scotland) Edinburgh Academicals
- (Scotland) Robbie Fergusson from (Scotland) Ayr RFC

==== Out ====
- (Scotland) Graeme Morrison retired
- (Scotland) John Barclay to (Wales) Scarlets
- (Argentina) Gabriel Ascárate released
- (Scotland) Geoff Cross to (Scotland) Edinburgh Rugby(loan ends)
- (Scotland) Nick Campbell to (England) Jersey
- (Scotland) Bruce Dick to (Scotland) Edinburgh Rugby
- (Scotland) Fraser Thomson to (Scotland) Melrose RFC
- (Scotland) Murray McConnell to (Scotland) Ayr RFC
- (Zimbabwe) Denford Mutamangira to (Scotland) Ayr RFC
- (Scotland) Callum Templeton to (Scotland) Ayr RFC
- James Johnstone to Scotland 7s
- (Scotland) Peter Jericevich to (Scotland) Edinburgh Academicals
- (Scotland) Callum Reid to (Scotland) Edinburgh Academicals
- (Scotland) Robbie Fergusson to (Scotland) Ayr RFC

== Competitions ==
=== Pre-season and friendlies ===
==== Match 1 ====
8 August 2013

| Aberdeen GSFP (Scotland) | 0-53 | (Scotland) Glasgow Warriors |
| | Report | Try: Byron McGuigan; Kevin Bryce; Adam Ashe; Ali Price x 2 Gordon Reid; Gabriel Ascarate; Jack Steele; Gavin Lowe; Con: Scott Wight x 3 Finn Russell |

Aberdeen GSFP: M Crawley; E Oag, H Duthie, W Wardlaw, C Gordon; M Ryan, M Ward; S Corsar, S Bingham, M Erksine, E Nimmons, S Smith, R Cessford, G Ryan (capt), T Preece. Subs (all played): R Coates, M Cox, A Wallace, C Harvey, S Warnock, G Clow, S Ryan, G Walker, A Rennie, L Earle-Wright, P Nacamavatu, S Knudson.
Glasgow Warriors: R Ferguson; B McGuigan, M Bennett, F Russell, D. T. H. van der Merwe; S Wight (capt), A Price; G Reid, K Bryce, J Welsh, A Redmayne, J Gray, R Harley, T Holmes, A Ashe. Subs (all played): F Gillies, D Rae, D Mutamangira, E Kalman, T Ryder, J Eddie, W Bordill, R Vernon, P Jericevich, R Hughes, G Ascarate, J Steele, G Lowe.

==== Match 2 ====
24 August 2013
2.30pm

| Harlequins (England) | 19-12 | (Scotland) Glasgow Warriors |
| Try: N Easter; U Monye; M Hopper; Con: N Evans; B Botica | Report | Try: Byron McGuigan; Con: Scott Wight; Pen: Scott Wight x 3 |

Twickenham Stoop
Referee: Andrew Small

Harlequins: M Brown, T Williams, G Lowe, J Turner-Hall, U Monye, N Evans, D Care; J Marler, J Gray, W Collier, G Merrick, G Robson, T Guest, C Robshaw, N Easter. Replacements (all used): R Buchanan, M Lambert, P Doran-Jones, S Twomey, L Wallace, K Dickson, B Botica, M Hopper, Maurie Fa'asavalu, D Ward, T Casson, P Sackey.
Glasgow Warriors: P Murchie, T Seymour, M Bennett, G Ascarate, B McGuigan, S Wight, A Price; G Reid, P McArthur, E Kalman, J Gray, T Ryder, J Eddie, C Fusaro, R Vernon. Replacements (all used): K Bryce, J Welsh, M Low, T Swinson, W Bordill, T Holmes, H Pyrgos, F Russell, R Hughes, S Lamont.

==== Match 3 ====
31 August 2013
3.00 pm

| Exeter Chiefs (England) | 26-29 | (Scotland) Glasgow Warriors |
| Try: James x 2 Con: Steenson x 2 Pen: Steenson x 4 | Report | Try: Byron McGuigan x 2 Mark Bennett; Alex Dunbar; Con: Scott Wight x2 Finn Russell; Pen: Scott Wight |

Sandy Park
Attendance: 5049
Referee: W Barnes

Chiefs: L Arscott (T James 39); F Vainikolo (M Jess 56), P Dollman, J Shoemark (S Hill 73), I Whitten; G Steenson, H Thomas (W Chudley 49); B Sturgess (B Moon 62), J Yeandle (C Whitehead 62), C Rimmer (A Brown 74), D Mumm, D Welch (T Hayes 66), B White (J Phillips 73), T Johnson (J Scaysbrook 53), D Ewers (B Moon 11–21). Replacements (not used): H Slade, W Carrick-Smith, K Horstmann, D Lewis, C Sweeney
Glasgow Warriors: P Murchie; T Seymour (G Ascarate 64), S Lamont (C Cusiter 53), A Dunbar, B McGuigan; S Wight (F Russell 62), H Pyrgos (M Bennett 62); M Low (J Yanuyanutawa 30; G Reid 62), F Brown (P MacArthur 30; F Gillies 62), J Welsh (E Kalman H/T), T Swinson, J Gray (L Nakawa 62), R Harley (J Eddie 62), T Holmes (C Fusaro H/T), R Vernon

=== Pro12 ===
Glasgow Warriors had a great start to the season winning their first five matches leaving them top of the league. However the results over the winter period were inconsistent and it wasn't until the spring that the side really got going again. Matches postponed over the winter period against Edinburgh and Treviso really helped give a late charge to the line. Glasgow's victory over Edinburgh in the 1872 decider won the 1872 Cup for the fifth year in a row and they found themselves second in the league. By the end of the league season, the Warriors had comfortably secured second spot. In fact, despite the inconsistent winter period the Glasgow side finished with more wins than first-placed Leinster, with only the Irish side's knack of securing bonus points giving them a slender lead.

This was the last season that a top finish secured a home semi-final and possible home final, so Leinster were favourites in the play-offs. They played 4th place Ulster in Dublin in their semi-final whilst Glasgow Warriors had a bruising match against 3rd place Munster at a packed Scotstoun. Perhaps crucially it was the Warriors first semi-final at home. It was the Glasgow side's 9th consecutive win in the season run-in.

Both Leinster and Glasgow Warriors won through, so Leinster secured their home final as expected. 5000 of the Warrior Nation made their way to Dublin to a very tight RDS Arena only to see Leinster take charge of the match in the second half and run out 34–12 winners.

==== League table ====
Pro12 Table
| | Team | Played | Won | Drawn | Lost | Points For | Points Against | Points Difference | Tries For | Tries Against | Try Bonus | Losing Bonus | Points |
| 1 | (Ireland) Leinster (CH) | 22 | 17 | 1 | 4 | 554 | 352 | +202 | 57 | 30 | 8 | 4 | 82 |
| 2 | (Scotland) Glasgow Warriors (RU) | 22 | 18 | 0 | 4 | 484 | 309 | +175 | 53 | 22 | 4 | 3 | 79 |
| 3 | (Ireland) Munster (SF) | 22 | 16 | 0 | 6 | 538 | 339 | +199 | 56 | 27 | 7 | 3 | 74 |
| 4 | (Ireland) Ulster (SF) | 22 | 15 | 0 | 7 | 470 | 319 | +151 | 45 | 26 | 6 | 4 | 70 |
| 5 | (Wales) Ospreys | 22 | 13 | 1 | 8 | 571 | 388 | +183 | 59 | 32 | 6 | 6 | 66 |
| 6 | (Wales) Scarlets | 22 | 11 | 1 | 10 | 435 | 438 | −3 | 43 | 45 | 3 | 6 | 55 |
| 7 | (Wales) Cardiff Blues | 22 | 8 | 1 | 13 | 425 | 538 | −113 | 32 | 55 | 1 | 6 | 41 |
| 8 | (Scotland) Edinburgh | 22 | 7 | 0 | 15 | 397 | 526 | −129 | 38 | 57 | 2 | 8 | 38 |
| 9 | (Wales) Newport Gwent Dragons | 22 | 7 | 1 | 14 | 392 | 492 | −100 | 34 | 46 | 0 | 5 | 35 |
| 10 | (Ireland) Connacht | 22 | 6 | 0 | 16 | 371 | 509 | −138 | 42 | 54 | 4 | 7 | 35 |
| 11 | (Italy) Benetton Treviso | 22 | 5 | 1 | 16 | 376 | 591 | −215 | 31 | 72 | 1 | 7 | 30 |
| 12 | (Italy) Zebre | 22 | 5 | 2 | 15 | 347 | 559 | −212 | 35 | 59 | 0 | 5 | 29 |
If teams are level at any stage, tiebreakers are applied in the following order: 1. number of matches won; 2. the difference between points for and points against; 3. the number of tries scored; 4. the most points scored; 5. the difference between tries for and tries against; 6. the fewest red cards received; 7. the fewest yellow cards received.
Green background (rows 1 to 4) are play-off places, and earn a place in the European Rugby Champions Cup. Blue background indicates teams outside the play-off places, that earn a place in the European Rugby Champions Cup. Plain background indicates teams that earn a place in the European Rugby Challenge Cup. European Rugby Champions/Challenge Cup qualification: The top team from each country, plus the three highest-placed teams apart from those, will qualify for the European Rugby Champions Cup. The remaining teams qualify for the European Rugby Challenge Cup. Updated 19 May 2014. Source: RaboDirect PRO12

==== Results ====
===== Round 1 =====
6 September 2013
19:35

| Glasgow Warriors (Scotland) | 22–15 | (Wales) Cardiff Blues (1 BP) |
| Try: Seymour 68' c Con: Jackson (1/1); Pen: Wight (2/3) 3', 34'; Bennett (2/3) 13', 40'; Jackson (1/1) 73' | Report | Pen: Patchell (4/6) 6', 9', 52', 56'; Drop: Patchell (1/1) 66' |

Scotstoun Stadium
Attendance: 5,052
Referee: Dudley Phillips (IRFU)

===== Round 2 =====
13 September 2013
19:05

| (1 BP) Ulster (Ireland) | 12–13 | (Scotland) Glasgow Warriors |
| Pen: Jackson (4/5) 8', 16', 22', 34' | Report | Try: Eddie 80' c Con: Hogg (1/1); Pen: Hogg (2/3) 6', 28' |

Ravenhill
Attendance: 11,500
Referee: Ian Davies (WRU)

===== Round 3 =====
20 September 2013
19:35

| Glasgow Warriors (Scotland) | 12–6 | (Ireland) Leinster (1 BP) |
| Try: Fusaro 39' c Yanuyanutawa 75' m Con: Hogg (1/1) | Report | Pen: Gopperth (2/2) 24', 60' |

Scotstoun Stadium
Attendance: 5,152
Referee: Peter Fitzgibbon (IRFU)

===== Round 4 =====
27 September 2013
19:30

| (1 BP) Zebre (Italy) | 17–24 | (Scotland) Glasgow Warriors |
| Try: Vunisa 73' c Sarto 77' c Con: Orquera (2/2); Pen: Orquera (1/2) 32' | Report | Try: McGuigan (2) 27' c, 56' c Hall 41' c Con: Pyrgos (3/3); Pen: Pyrgos (1/2) 25' |

Stadio XXV Aprile
Attendance: 2,800
Referee: Dudley Phillips (IRFU)

===== Round 5 =====
5 October 2013
18:30

| (1 BP) Scarlets (Wales) | 12–17 | (Scotland) Glasgow Warriors |
| Pen: Priestland (3/3) 17', 38', 42'; J. Williams (1/2) 60' | Report | Try: Grant 4' c Swinson 30' c Con: Weir (2/2); Pen: Weir (1/1) 62' |

Parc y Scarlets
Attendance: 6,504
Referee: Giuseppe Vivarini (FIR)

===== Round 6 =====
25 October 2013
19:35

| (1 BP) Glasgow Warriors (Scotland) | 6–13 | (Ireland) Munster |
| Pen: Weir (2/3) 3', 25' | Report | Try: Hanrahan 44' c Con: Hanrahan (1/1); Pen: Hanrahan (2/2) 21', 47' |

Scotstoun Stadium
Attendance: 5,726
Referee: Ian Davies (WRU)

===== Round 7 =====
2 November 2013
17:00

| (1 BP) Connacht (Ireland) | 12–19 | (Scotland) Glasgow Warriors |
| Pen: Parks (2/4) 15', 51'; Ronaldson (2/3) 61', 69' | Report | Try: Van der Merwe 5' c Con: Weir (1/1); Pen: Weir (4/4) 24', 33', 55', 79' |

Galway Sportsgrounds
Attendance: 4,185
Referee: Neil Paterson (SRU)

===== Round 8 =====
22 November 2013
19:35

| Glasgow Warriors (Scotland) | 8–23 | (Wales) Newport Gwent Dragons |
| Try: Matawalu 2' m Pen: Pyrgos (1/2) 44' | Report | Try: Tovey 33' c Harries 57' c Con: Tovey (2/2); Pen: Tovey (2/2) 8', 11'; Drop: Tovey (1/1) 76' |

Scotstoun Stadium
Attendance: 4,665
Referee: Peter Fitzgibbon (IRFU)

===== Round 9 =====
29 November 2013
19:05

| Ospreys (Wales) | 16–28 | (Scotland) Glasgow Warriors |
| Try: Hassler 17' c Con: Davies (1/1); Pen: Davies (2/2) 34', 54'; Drop: Davies (1/1) 25' | Report | Try: Cusiter 58' m Van der Merwe 68' c Wilson 80' c Con: Jackson (2/3); Pen: Jackson (2/2) 3', 23'; Hogg (1/1) 61' |

Liberty Stadium
Attendance: 5,679
Referee: Dudley Phillips (IRFU)

===== Round 10 =====
20 December 2013
19:35

| Glasgow Warriors (Scotland) | P–P | (Italy) Benetton Treviso |
| | Postponed due to a waterlogged pitch. |

Scotstoun Stadium
Referee: Claudio Blessano (FIR)

===== Round 11: 1872 Cup (1st Leg) =====
26 December 2013
15:05

| (1 BP) Edinburgh (Scotland) | 16–20 | (Scotland) Glasgow Warriors |
| Try: Fife 14' c Con: Laidlaw (1/1); Pen: Laidlaw (3/4) 8', 27', 39' | Report | Try: Hogg 67' m Pen: Weir (5/5) 3', 12', 22', 51', 62' |

Murrayfield Stadium
Attendance: 10,125
Referee: Neil Paterson (SRU)

===== Round 12 =====
1 January 2014
18:05

| Glasgow Warriors (Scotland) | P–P | (Scotland) Edinburgh |
| | Postponed due to a waterlogged pitch. |

Scotstoun Stadium
Referee: Andrew McMenemy (SRU)

===== Round 13 =====
9 February 2014
14:00

| Glasgow Warriors (Scotland) | 8–6 | (Ireland) Connacht (1 BP) |
| Try: Bennett 18' m Pen: Jackson (1/4) 43' | Report | Pen: Ronaldson (2/5) 8', 40' |

Scotstoun Stadium
Attendance: 3,904
Referee: Leighton Hodges (WRU)

===== Round 14 =====
15 February 2014
18:30

| (1 BP) Cardiff Blues (Wales) | 20–27 | (Scotland) Glasgow Warriors |
| Try: Copeland 34' c Jones 44' c Con: Humberstone (2/2); Pen: Humberstone (1/1) 7'; G. Davies (1/1) 68' | Report | Try: Jones 40' c Eddie 71' c Bennett 78' c Con: Jackson (1/1); Russell (2/2); Pen: Russell (2/2) 54', 66' |

Cardiff Arms Park
Attendance: 5,645
Referee: George Clancy (IRFU)

===== Round 15 =====
23 February 2014
14:30

| Newport Gwent Dragons (Wales) | 24–23 | (Scotland) Glasgow Warriors (1 BP) |
| Try: O. Evans 14' c Hill 62' c Wardle 70' c Con: Tovey (1/1); R. Jones (2/2); Pen: Tovey (1/1) 10' | Report | Try: Harley 3' c Matawalu 35' c Con: Russell (2/2); Pen: Bennett (1/2) 13'; Russell (2/3) 56', 67' |

Rodney Parade
Attendance: 3,916
Referee: Matteo Liperini (FIR)

===== Round 16 =====
1 March 2014
20:30

| Leinster (Ireland) | 28–25 | (Scotland) Glasgow Warriors (1 BP) |
| Try: Reid 6' c Fanning 38' m Ruddock 63' c Con: Madigan (2/3); Pen: Madigan (3/3) 18', 27', 30' | Report | Try: Vernon (2) 12' c, 23' m Matawalu 50' c Con: Russell (2/3); Pen: Russell (2/2) 40', 76' |

RDS Arena
Attendance: 14,400
Referee: Nigel Owens (WRU)

===== Round 17 =====
22 March 2014
18:30

| Glasgow Warriors (Scotland) | 14–6 | (Wales) Scarlets |
| Try: Matawalu 31' m Pen: Weir (3/3) 8', 21', 43' | Report | Pen: Barkley (2/2) 26', 50' |

Scotstoun Stadium
Attendance: 4,679
Referee: Alain Rolland (IRFU)

===== Round 18 =====
28 March 2014
19:35

| Glasgow Warriors (Scotland) | 11–9 | (Wales) Ospreys (1 BP) |
| Try: Seymour 76' m Pen: Weir (2/3) 49', 58' | Report | Pen: Biggar (2/2) 20', 66'; Drop: Biggar (1/2) 72' |

Scotstoun Stadium
Attendance: 5,038
Referee: John Lacey (IRFU)

===== Round 10 rescheduled match =====
4 April 2014
19:35

| (1 BP) Glasgow Warriors (Scotland) | 29–10 | (Italy) Benetton Treviso |
| Try: Pyrgos (2) 1' m, 14' c Matawalu 4' c Maitland 53' c Con: Russell (3/4); Pen: Russell (1/1) 46' | Report | Try: Sgarbi 11' c Con: Botes (1/1); Pen: Botes (1/3) 18' |

Scotstoun Stadium
Attendance: 4,710
Referee: Giuseppe Vivarini (FIR)

This match – originally scheduled to be held during Round 10, on 20 December 2013 – was postponed due to a waterlogged pitch.

===== Round 19 =====
12 April 2014
18:30

| Munster (Ireland) | 5–22 | (Scotland) Glasgow Warriors |
| Try: Stander 18' m | Report | Try: Gray 4' c Maitland 25' m Strauss 36' c Con: Weir (2/3); Pen: Weir (1/1) 9' |

Thomond Park
Attendance: 13,946
Referee: Nigel Owens (WRU)

===== Round 20 =====
18 April 2014
19:35

| Glasgow Warriors (Scotland) | 27–9 | (Ireland) Ulster |
| Try: Maitland 40' c Seymour 48' c Bennett 67' c Con: Russell (3/3); Pen: Russell (2/2) 9', 43' | Report | Pen: Jackson (3/5) 21', 25', 28' |

Scotstoun Stadium
Attendance: 7,417
Referee: John Lacey (IRFU)

===== Round 12 rescheduled match: 1872 Cup (2nd Leg) =====
26 April 2014
19:05

| (1 BP) Glasgow Warriors (Scotland) | 37–34 | (Scotland) Edinburgh (2 BP) |
| Try: Murchie (2) 8' m, 49' c Jackson 22' m Bennett 40' c Harley 76' c Con: Russell (3/5); Pen: Russell (2/3) 4', 12' | Report | Try: Nel 15' c Scott 58' c Visser (2) 79' c, 80' c Con: Laidlaw (4/4); Pen: Laidlaw (2/3) 21', 36' |

Scotstoun Stadium
Attendance: 8,855
Referee: Mathieu Raynal (FFR)

This match – originally scheduled to be held during Round 12, on 1 January 2014 – was postponed due to a waterlogged pitch.

Glasgow Warriors won the 1872 Cup with an aggregate score of 57 - 50.

===== Round 21 =====
2 May 2014
20:00

| Benetton Treviso (Italy) | 16–38 | (Scotland) Glasgow Warriors (1 BP) |
| Try: penalty try 78' c Con: Ambrosini (1/1); Pen: Berquist (3/3) 13', 24', 31' | Report | Try: Seymour (3) 21' c, 42' c, 58' c Reid 48' m Con: Russell (3/4); Pen: Russell (3/4) 15', 27', 39'; Bennett (1/1) 40' |

Stadio Comunale di Monigo
Attendance: 3,113
Referee: George Clancy (IRFU)

===== Round 22 =====
10 May 2014
18:30

| (1 BP) Glasgow Warriors (Scotland) | 54–0 | (Italy) Zebre |
| Try: Hogg (2) 1' c, 19' m Grant 7' c Kellock 15' c Dunbar 22' c Matawalu (2) 31' c, 76' c Cross 66' c Con: Weir (6/7); Jackson (1/1) | Report |

Scotstoun Stadium
Attendance: 5,950
Referee: Alain Rolland (IRFU)

==== Play-offs ====
===== Semi-finals =====
16 May 2014
19:35

| Glasgow Warriors (Scotland) | 16–15 | (Ireland) Munster |
| Try: Reid 46' c Con: Russell (1/1); Pen: Russell (3/4) 17', 36', 39' | Report | Try: Varley 9' c Dougall 51' m Con: Keatley (1/2); Pen: Keatley (1/1) 66' |

Scotstoun Stadium
Attendance: 10,000
Referee: Marius Mitrea (FIR)

===== Final =====
31 May 2014
18:15

| Leinster (Ireland) | 34–12 | (Scotland) Glasgow Warriors |
| Try: Kirchner (2) 17' c, 74' c Jennings 38' c D'Arcy 76' c Con: Gopperth (4/4); Pen: Gopperth (2/3) 60', 65' | Report | Pen: Russell (4/4) 4', 13', 35', 40' |

RDS Arena
Attendance: 19,200
Referee: Nigel Owens (WRU)

=== Europe ===
Despite initial confidence over a decent European run Glasgow Warriors had a mixed European campaign in 2013–14. The first match against Toulon seemed to sum up the Warriors' European experience over the season; good in parts but not consistent enough to win out.

Unfortunately for the Warriors, aside from the opening two games in October, the European matches fell in a winter period when they suffered most from inconsistencies. Losing both matches against Cardiff Blues - a side that finished 7th in the Pro12 that year - really put paid to any hopes and the last match at home to Toulon which could have otherwise ended in a group decider fizzled out with another Toulon victory. Only wins against the Exeter Chiefs gave any solace and the Warriors finished bottom of their group.

==== Results ====
===== Round 1 =====
13 October 2013
16:00

| (1 BP) Toulon (France) | 51–28 | (Scotland) Glasgow Warriors (1 BP) |
| Try: D. Armitage 8' c Mermoz (2) 15' c, 34' c Masoe 24' c Giteau (2) 49' c, 78' c Con: Wilkinson (3/3); Giteau (1/1); Michalak (2/2); Pen: Wilkinson (1/1) 6'; Michalak (2/2) 40', 64' | Report | Try: Van der Merwe (2) 41' c, 62' c Matawalu 52' c Gray 58' c Con: Jackson (4/4) |

Stade Mayol
Attendance: 14,145
Referee: Greg Garner (RFU)

===== Round 2 =====
20 October 2013
14:00

| Glasgow Warriors (Scotland) | 20–16 | (England) Exeter Chiefs (1 BP) |
| Try: Swinson 48' c Holmes 71' c Con: Jackson (2/2); Pen: Jackson (2/3) 6', 14' | Report | Try: Ewers 75' c Con: Slade (1/1); Pen: Steenson (3/4) 2', 12', 20' |

Scotstoun Stadium
Attendance: 6,047
Referee: Romain Poite (FFR)

===== Round 3 =====
6 December 2013
20:00

| Cardiff Blues (Wales) | 29–20 | (Scotland) Glasgow Warriors |
| Try: Patchell 21' c Cuthbert 72' c Con: Halfpenny (2/2); Pen: Halfpenny (4/5) 11', 31', 46', 70'; Patchell (1/1) 15' | Report | Try: Maitland 38' c Nakarawa 78' c Con: Weir (2/2); Pen: Weir (2/2) 52', 62' |

Cardiff Arms Park
Attendance: 6,144
Referee: George Clancy (IRFU)

===== Round 4 =====
13 December 2013
20:00

| (1 BP) Glasgow Warriors (Scotland) | 7–9 | (Wales) Cardiff Blues |
| Try: Grant 70' c Con: Weir (1/1) | Report | Pen: Patchell (1/1) 6'; Halfpenny (2/3) 22', 65' |

Scotstoun Stadium
Attendance: 5,429
Referee: Pascal Gaüzère (FFR)

===== Round 5 =====
11 January 2014
15:00

| (1 BP) Exeter Chiefs (England) | 10–15 | (Scotland) Glasgow Warriors |
| Try: Vainikolo 16' c Con: Slade (1/1); Pen: Slade (1/2) 2' | Report | Try: Maitland 18' m Lamont 34' c Con: Hogg (1/1); Pen: Hogg (1/1) 49' |

Sandy Park
Attendance: 6,978
Referee: George Clancy (IRFU)

===== Round 6 =====
18 January 2014
15:40

| (1 BP) Glasgow Warriors (Scotland) | 8–15 | (France) Toulon |
| Try: Fusaro 63' m Pen: Jackson (1/1) 30' | Report | Pen: Wilkinson (5/7) 27', 37', 42', 51', 57' |

Scotstoun Stadium
Attendance: 6,541
Referee: JP Doyle (RFU)

==== Table ====
| Team | P | W | D | L | PF | PA | Diff | TF | TA | TB | LB | Pts |
|---|---|---|---|---|---|---|---|---|---|---|---|---|
| (France) Toulon | 6 | 5 | 0 | 1 | 170 | 104 | +66 | 15 | 10 | 3 | 1 | 24 |
| (Wales) Cardiff Blues | 6 | 3 | 0 | 3 | 119 | 148 | −29 | 10 | 14 | 1 | 1 | 14 |
| (England) Exeter Chiefs | 6 | 2 | 0 | 4 | 118 | 123 | −5 | 11 | 14 | 1 | 3 | 12 |
| (Scotland) Glasgow Warriors | 6 | 2 | 0 | 4 | 98 | 130 | −32 | 12 | 10 | 1 | 2 | 11 |

== End of Season awards ==
| Award | Winner |
|---|---|
| Young Player of the Season | (Scotland) Finn Russell |
| Coaches Award | (Scotland) James Eddie |
| Test Player of the Season | (Scotland) Alex Dunbar |
| Most Improved Player of the Season | (Scotland) Gordon Reid |
| Club Ambassador of the Season | (Scotland) Peter Murchie |
| Try of the Season | (Scotland) Tommy Seymour vs. (Italy) Treviso |
| Players' Player of the Season | (Scotland) Jonny Gray |
| Player of the Season | (Scotland) Rob Harley |

== Competitive debuts this season ==
A player's nationality shown is taken from the nationality at the highest honour for the national side obtained; or if never capped internationally their place of birth. Senior caps take precedence over junior caps or place of birth; junior caps take precedence over place of birth. A player's nationality at debut may be different from the nationality shown. Combination sides like the British and Irish Lions or Pacific Islanders are not national sides, or nationalities.

Players in BOLD font have been capped by their senior international XV side as nationality shown.

Players in Italic font have capped either by their international 7s side; or by the international XV 'A' side as nationality shown.

Players in normal font have not been capped at senior level.

A position in parentheses indicates that the player debuted as a substitute. A player may have made a prior debut for Glasgow Warriors in a non-competitive match, 'A' match or 7s match; these matches are not listed.

Tournaments where competitive debut made:

| **Scottish Inter-District Championship** | **Welsh–Scottish League** | **WRU Challenge Cup** | **Celtic League** | **Celtic Cup** | **1872 Cup** | **Pro12** | **Pro14** | **Rainbow Cup** | **United Rugby Championship** | **European Challenge Cup** | **Heineken Cup / European Champions Cup** |

Crosshatching indicates a jointly hosted match.

| Number | Player nationality | Name | Position | Date of debut | Venue | Stadium | Opposition nationality | Opposition side | Tournament | Match result | Scoring debut |
|---|---|---|---|---|---|---|---|---|---|---|---|
| 221 | (Fiji) | **Jerry Yanuyanutawa** | Prop | 2013-09-06 | Home | Scotstoun Stadium | (Wales) | Cardiff Blues | Pro12 | Win | Nil |
| 222 | (Scotland) | **Tyrone Holmes** | (Flanker) | 2013-09-06 | Home | Scotstoun Stadium | (Wales) | Cardiff Blues | Pro12 | Win | Nil |
| 223 | (Argentina) | **Gabriel Ascárate** | (Wing) | 2013-09-13 | Away | Ravenhill Stadium | (Ireland) | Ulster | Pro12 | Win | Nil |
| 224 | (Fiji) | **Leone Nakarawa** | (Lock) | 2013-11-02 | Away | Galway Sportsgrounds | (Ireland) | Connacht | Pro12 | Win | Nil |
| 225 | (Scotland) | Jack Steele | (Centre) | 2013-11-22 | Home | Scotstoun Stadium | (Wales) | Dragons | Pro12 | Loss | Nil |
| 226 | (Scotland) | **Rory Hughes** | Wing | 2014-02-09 | Home | Scotstoun Stadium | (Ireland) | Connacht | Pro12 | Win | Nil |
| 227 | (Scotland) | **Lee Jones** | Wing | 2014-02-09 | Home | Scotstoun Stadium | (Ireland) | Connacht | Pro12 | Win | Nil |
| 228 | (United States) | **Folau Niua** | (Centre) | 2014-02-23 | Away | Rodney Parade | (Wales) | Dragons | Pro12 | Loss | Nil |
| 229 | (Scotland) | **Kevin Bryce** | (Hooker) | 2014-02-23 | Away | Rodney Parade | (Wales) | Dragons | Pro12 | Loss | Nil |
| 230 | (Scotland) | **Geoff Cross** | Prop | 2014-04-04 | Away | Stadio Comunale di Monigo | (Italy) | Benetton Treviso | Pro12 | Win | Nil |

== Sponsorship ==
- BT Sport
- Rowan Glen
- McCrea Financial Services
- Malcolm Group
- QBE Insurance

=== Official kit supplier ===
Macron
