= 2007–08 Glasgow Warriors season =

- Ground: Firhill Stadium (Capacity: 10,887)
- Coach: (Scotland) Sean Lineen
- Captain: (Scotland) Alastair Kellock
- Most caps: (Argentina) Bernardo Stortoni (Scotland) Moray Low (Scotland) Johnnie Beattie (24)
- Top scorer: (Scotland) Dan Parks (234)
- Most tries: (Scotland) Dan Parks (6)
- League: Celtic League
- 5th
1st kit	2nd kit

The 2007–08 season saw Glasgow Warriors compete in the Celtic League and the Heineken Cup.

== Team ==
=== Staff ===
Chairman: Charles Shaw
Chief Executive: Ian Riddoch
Medical Team: Dr. Gerry Haggerty, Lisa Casey, Paul McGinley, Nicola McGuire
Fitness Team: Gary Sheriff, Andy Smith, Ian Cleland
Media Manager: Stuart Martin
Kit Manager & Masseur: Dougie Mills
Video Analyst: Robert Holdsworth
Team Co-Ordinator: Kim Gray
Community Board Members: Walter Malcolm, Douglas McCrea
Community Marketing Officer: Natalie Duncan
Administrator: Nicola Sturgeon

=== Squad ===
Hookers (Scotland) Ross Ford (Scotland) Dougie Hall (Scotland) Eric Milligan (Scotland) Fergus Thomson Props (New Zealand) Michael Collins (Scotland) Ed Kalman (Scotland) Moray Low (Scotland) Ben Prescott (Canada) Kevin Tkachuk (Samoa) Justin Va'a Locks (Scotland) Alastair Kellock (Wales) Andy Newman (Samoa) Opeta Palepoi (Scotland) Dan Turner	Loose forwards (Scotland) John Barclay (Scotland) Johnnie Beattie (Scotland) Kelly Brown (Scotland) James Eddie (Scotland) Donnie Macfadyen (Scotland) Steve Swindall (Scotland) Richie Vernon Scrum-halves (Scotland) Colin Gregor (Australia) Chris O'Young (Scotland) Sam Pinder Fly-halves (Scotland) Mike Adamson (Scotland) Dan Parks	Centres (England) Scott Barrow (Scotland) Max Evans (New Zealand) Daryl Gibson (Scotland) Andrew Henderson (Scotland) Graeme Morrison Back three (Scotland) Thom Evans (Samoa) Lome Fa'atau (Scotland) Hefin O'Hare (Scotland) Sean Marsden (Scotland) Colin Shaw (Argentina) Bernardo Stortoni

==== Academy players ====
- (Scotland) Alan Dymock – Prop
- (Scotland) Neil Rodger – Hooker
- (Scotland) Pat MacArthur – Hooker
- (Scotland) Richie Gray – Lock
- (Scotland) Rob Harley – Flanker
- (Scotland) Calum Forrester – Flanker
- (Scotland) Andy Dymock – Scrum half
- (Scotland) Jamie Hunter – Fly-half
- (Scotland) Andy White – Fly-half
- (Scotland) Steven Aitken – Centre
- (Scotland) Scott Forrest – Centre
- (Scotland) Richard Mills
- (Scotland) Ben Addison – full back

== Player statistics ==
During the 2007–08 season, Glasgow used 35 different players in competitive games. The table below shows the number of appearances and points scored by each player.

Position	Nation	Name	Celtic League			Champions Cup			Total	
Position	Nation	Name	Apps (sub)	Tries	Points kicked	Apps (sub)	Tries	Points kicked	Apps (sub)	Total Pts
HK	(Scotland)	Dougie Hall	4(4)	1	0	1(1)	0	0	5(5)	5
HK	(Scotland)	Eric Milligan	4(2)	0	0	(4)	0	0	4(6)	0
HK	(Scotland)	Fergus Thomson	10(3)	0	0	5	0	0	15(3)	0
PR	(New Zealand)	Michael Collins	2(3)	0	0	0	0	0	2(3)	0
PR	(Scotland)	Ed Kalman	5(7)	0	0	1(5)	0	0	6(12)	0
PR	(Scotland)	Moray Low	18	3	0	5(1)	0	0	23(1)	15
PR	(Scotland)	Ben Prescott	(1)	0	0	0	0	0	(1)	0
PR	(Canada)	Kevin Tkachuk	(6)	0	0	1(1)	0	0	1(7)	0
PR	(Samoa)	Justin Va'a	11(1)	0	0	5(1)	0	0	16(2)	0
LK	(Scotland)	Alastair Kellock	10(1)	0	0	4	1	0	14(1)	5
LK	(Wales)	Andy Newman	13(3)	0	0	3	0	0	16(3)	0
LK	(Samoa)	Opeta Palepoi	5(3)	0	0	2(2)	0	0	7(5)	0
LK	(Scotland)	Dan Turner	8(8)	0	0	3(3)	0	0	11(11)	0
BR	(Scotland)	John Barclay	12(1)	0	0	6	3	0	18(1)	15
BR	(Scotland)	Johnnie Beattie	16(2)	3	0	6	0	0	22(2)	15
BR	(Scotland)	Kelly Brown	11	1	0	6	1	0	17	10
BR	(Scotland)	James Eddie	5(10)	1	0	(6)	0	0	5(16)	5
BR	(Scotland)	Donnie Macfadyen	2	0	0	0	0	0	2	0
BR	(Scotland)	Steve Swindall	6	0	0	0	0	0	6	0
BR	(Scotland)	Richie Vernon	1(2)	0	0	0	0	0	1(2)	0
SH	(Scotland)	Colin Gregor	10(3)	1	51	2(1)	0	0	12(4)	56
SH	(Australia)	Chris O'Young	6(2)	0	0	2(2)	0	0	8(4)	0
SH	(Scotland)	Sam Pinder	8(7)	4	0	4(2)	1	0	12(9)	25
FH	(Scotland)	Mike Adamson	(1)	0	0	0	0	0	(1)	0
FH	(Scotland)	Dan Parks	12	5	134	6	1	70	18	234
CE	(England)	Scott Barrow	1(16)	0	0	2(3)	0	0	3(19)	0
CE	(Scotland)	Max Evans	9(2)	1	0	0	0	0	9(2)	5
CE	(New Zealand)	Daryl Gibson	14	0	0	4	0	0	18	0
CE	(Scotland)	Andrew Henderson	6(1)	0	0	3(1)	0	0	9(2)	0
CE	(Scotland)	Graeme Morrison	13(1)	0	0	1(2)	1	0	14(3)	5
WG	(Scotland)	Thom Evans	13	4	0	3	0	0	16	20
WG	(Samoa)	Lome Fa'atau	8	3	0	5	0	0	13	15
WG	(Scotland)	Hefin O'Hare	5(9)	1	0	3(2)	2	0	8(11)	15
WG	(Scotland)	Colin Shaw	3	1	0	1	0	0	4	5
FB	(Argentina)	Bernardo Stortoni	18	1	0	6	2	0	24	15

== Staff movements ==
=== Staff ===
==== Personnel in ====
- (Scotland) Ian Riddoch – General Manager

== Player movements ==
=== Academy promotions ===
- (Scotland) Moray Low

=== Player transfers ===
==== In ====
- (Scotland) Ross Ford from (Scotland) Border Reivers
- (Samoa) Lome Fa'atau from (New Zealand) Hurricanes
- (Argentina) Bernardo Stortoni from (England) Bristol
- (Australia) Chris O'Young from (Australia) Western Force
- (Scotland) Richie Vernon from (Scotland) Border Reivers
- (New Zealand) Daryl Gibson from (England) Leicester Tigers
- (Scotland) Dougie Hall from (Scotland) Edinburgh
- (Scotland) Ed Kalman from (Scotland) Border Reivers

==== Out ====
- (Scotland) Stuart Corsar to (England) Rotherham Titans
- (Scotland) Ross Ford to (Scotland) Edinburgh Rugby
- (Argentina) Francisco Leonelli released
- (Scotland) Scott Lawson to (England) Sale Sharks
- (Scotland) Euan Murray to (England) Northampton Saints
- (Scotland) Rory Lamont to (England) Sale Sharks
- (Scotland) Jon Petrie retired

== Competitions ==
=== Pre-season and friendlies ===
==== Match 1 ====
24 August 2007
19:00

Rotherham Titans (England)	7–22	(Scotland) Glasgow Warriors
Try: ? Con: ?	Preview [ Report] Report	Try: Sam Pinder; Donnie Macfadyen; Chris O'Young; Richie Vernon; Con: Mike Adamson

Millmoor

Rotherham Titans:
Replacements:
Glasgow Warriors: Sean Marsden, Hefin O'Hare, Graeme Morrison, Scott Barrow, Colin Shaw, Colin Gregor, Sam Pinder, Michael Collins, Eric Milligan, Ben Prescott, James Eddie, Opeta Palepoi, Stevie Swindall, Donnie Macfadyen, Johnnie Beattie
Replacements: Ben Addison, Daryl Gibson, Thom Evans, Mike Adamson, Chris O'Young, Pat McArthur, Ed Kalman, Andy Newman, Dan Turner, Richie Vernon, John Barclay, Scott Forrest, Ruaridh Jackson, Jamie Hunter

==== Match 2 ====
31 August 2007
19:30

Glasgow Warriors (Scotland)	18–13	(England) Newcastle Falcons
Try: Chris O'Young; Sam Pinder; Con: Colin Gregor; Pen: Colin Gregor (2)	Preview [ Report] Report	Try: Andy Buist; Geoff Parling; Pen: Steve Jones

Firhill Stadium
Referee: Andrew Macpherson (West of Scotland RRS)

Glasgow Warriors: Michael Collins, Eric Milligan, Ben Prescott, Andy Newman, Alastair Kellock, Steve Swindall, Donnie Macfadyen, Johnnie Beattie, Chris O'Young, Colin Gregor, Hefin O'Hare, Daryl Gibson, Graeme Morrison, Max Evans, Colin Shaw
Replacements: Pat MacArthur, Ed Kalman, Moray Low, Dan Turner, James Eddie, Opeta Palepoi, Richie Vernon, Scott Forrest, Sam Pinder, Mike Adamson, Sean Marsden, Scott Barrow, Bernardo Stortoni

Newcastle Falcons: Matt Burke, Tom May, James Hoyle, Mark Mayerhofler, John Rudd, Steve Jones, Lee Dickson, Joe McDonnell, Matt Thompson, Micky Ward, Andy Buist, Mark Sorenson, Geoff Parting, Ben Woods, Phil Dowson (c)
Replacements: Andy Long, David Wilson, Jon Golding, Andy Perry, Brent Wilson, James Grindal, Adam Dehaty, Joe Shaw, Ollie Phillips

==== Match 3 ====
7 September 2007
19:30

Wasps (England)	34–8	(Scotland) Glasgow Warriors
Try: John Hart; David Doherty (2); Riki Flutey; Dominic Waldouck; Hugo Ellis; Con: ?	Preview; Report	Try: Hefin O'Hare; Pen: Colin Gregor

Adams Park
Attendance: 2236
Referee: Martin Fox (RFU)

Wasps:
Replacements:
Glasgow Warriors: Michael Collins, Eric Milligan, Moray Low, Andy Newman, Dan Turner, Steve Swindall, Donnie Macfadyen, Johnnie Beattie, Chris O'Young, Colin Gregor, Thom Evans, Scott Barrow, Graeme Morrison, Hefin O'Hare, Colin Shaw
Replacements: Pat MacArthur, Ed Kalman, Ben Prescott, James Eddie, Opeta Palepoi, Richie Vernon, Sam Pinder, Mike Adamson, Max Evans, Sean Marsden, Scott Barrow, Bernardo Stortoni

==== Match 4 ====
5 November 2007
19:00

Leeds Carnegie (England)	6–19	(Scotland) Glasgow Warriors
Pen: Adam Greendale (2)	Preview Report	Try: Opeta Palepoi; Colin Gregor; Hefin O'Hare; Con: Colin Gregor (2)

Sycamores, West Park Leeds

Leeds Carnegie: 1 Michael Cusack 2 Scott Freer 3 Adam Hopcroft 4 James Craig 5 Mark Anderson 6 Andrew Boyde 7 Sam Stitcher ( C ) 8 Max Lewis 9 Mike Aspinall 10 Adam Greendale 11 Luther Burrell 12 Lee Blackett 13 Tom Rock 14 Andy Rock 15 Pete Wackett
Replacements: 16 Chris Steel 17 Aarin Yorke 18 Chris Wilson 19 Gareth Williams 20 Dan White 21 Luke Gray
Glasgow Warriors: 15 Colin Shaw 14 Hefin O'Hare 13 Graeme Morrison 12 Scott Barrow 11 Chris Kinloch 10 Colin Gregor 9 Mike Adamson 1 Justin Va'a 2 Eric Milligan 3 Mike Collins 4 Opeta Palepoi 5 Dan Turner 6 James Eddie 7 Calum Forrester 8 Richie Vernon
Replacements: Ruaridh Jackson, Andrew Dymock, Scott Forrest, Allan Kelly, Ben Prescott, Pat McArthur, Alan Dymock, Tom Bury

=== European Champions Cup ===
==== Pool 4 ====
Team	P	W	D	L	Tries for	Tries against	Try diff	Points for	Points against	Points diff	TB	LB	Pts
(England) Saracens (1)	6	5	0	1	27	11	16	225	119	106	3	1	24
(France) Biarritz	6	4	0	2	9	11	−2	109	116	−7	1	1	18
(Scotland) Glasgow Warriors	6	3	0	3	12	14	−2	130	127	3	1	3	16
(Italy) Viadana	6	0	0	6	13	25	−12	106	208	−102	2	1	3

==== Results ====
===== Round 1 =====
11 November 2007
15:00

Saracens (England)	33–31	(Scotland) Glasgow Warriors
Try: Vyvyan 8' c Penney 17' c Skirving 38' m Ratuvou 50' m Con: Jackson (2); Pen: Jackson (3) 23', 32', 79'	Preview; Report; Report; Report	Try: Barclay 25' m O'Hare 73' c Kellock 80' c Con: Parks (2); Pen: Parks (4) 6', 30', 43', 55'

Vicarage Road, Watford
Attendance: 7,012
Referee: Romain Poite (France)

===== Round 2 =====
16 November 2007
19:30

Glasgow Warriors (Scotland)	41–31	(Italy) Viadana
Tries: O'Hare 10' c Parks 21' c Morrison 23' c Pinder 60' c Barclay 65' c Con: Parks (5); Pen: Parks (2) 15', 48'	Preview; Report; Report; Report	Tries: Pedersen (2) 4' c, 34' c Birchall 46' c Bortolussi 80' c Con: Howarth (4); Pen: Howarth 41'

Firhill Stadium, Glasgow
Attendance: 1,722
Referee: James Jones (Wales)

===== Round 3 =====
9 December 2007
13:00

Glasgow Warriors (Scotland)	9–6	(France) Biarritz
Pen: Parks (3) 8', 13', 38'	Preview; Report; Report; Report	Pen: Dupuy (2) 26', 73'

Firhill Stadium, Glasgow
Attendance: 2,194
Referee: Tim Hayes (Wales)

===== Round 4 =====
14 December 2007
21:00

Biarritz (France)	21–14	(Scotland) Glasgow Warriors
Tries: Vahafolau 77' c, 80+3' m Con: Traille; Pen: Traille (3) 32', 56', 64'	Preview; Report; Report; Report	Try: Barclay 23' m Pen: Parks (2) 1', 21'; Drop: Parks 57'

Parc des Sports Aguiléra, Biarritz
Attendance: 7,200
Referee: Nigel Owens (Wales)

===== Round 5 =====
12 January 2008
14:30

Viadana (Italy)	15–18	(Scotland) Glasgow Warriors
Tries: Erasmus (2) 26' c, 36' m Con: Howarth; Pen: Pilat 75'	Preview; Report; Report; Report	Tries: Brown 23' c Stortoni 65' m Con: Parks; Pen: Parks (2) 40', 48'

Stadio Luigi Zaffanella, Viadana
Attendance: 2,270
Referee: Jérôme Garces (France)

===== Round 6 =====
18 January 2008
20:00

Glasgow Warriors (Scotland)	17–21	(England) Saracens
Try: Stortoni 61' m Pen: Parks (4) 17', 24', 40+1', 76'	Preview; Report; Report; Report	Tries: Haughton 4' m Jackson 40+3' c Con: Jackson; Pen: Jackson (3) 21', 38', 68'

Firhill Stadium, Glasgow
Attendance: 5,213
Referee: Alan Lewis (Ireland)

=== Magners Celtic League ===
==== League table ====
Team	Pld	W	D	L	PF	PA	PD	TF	TA	Try bonus	Losing bonus	Pts
(Ireland) Leinster	18	13	1	4	428	283	+145	44	30	4	3	61
(Wales) Cardiff Blues	18	12	0	6	395	315	+80	48	31	6	2	56
(Ireland) Munster	18	10	1	7	330	258	+72	33	26	2	4	48
(Scotland) Edinburgh	18	9	3	6	313	285	+28	35	29	3	3	48
(Scotland) Glasgow Warriors	18	10	1	7	340	349	−9	31	38	1	3	46
(Wales) Llanelli Scarlets	18	7	0	11	403	362	+41	45	38	6	5	39
(Wales) Ospreys	18	6	1	11	321	255	+66	24	24	2	9	37
(Wales) Newport Gwent Dragons	18	7	1	10	282	394	−112	31	44	1	3	34
(Ireland) Ulster	18	6	1	11	278	407	−129	33	41	2	1	29
(Ireland) Connacht	18	5	1	12	214	396	−182	16	39	0	2	24
Under the standard bonus point system, points are awarded as follows: 4 points for a win; 2 points for a draw; 1 bonus point for scoring 4 tries (or more) (Try bonus); 1 bonus point for losing by 7 points (or fewer) (Losing bonus)
Source: RaboDirect PRO12

==== Results ====
Some of the all Welsh fixtures were played early to allow the Welsh teams to play in the British & Irish Cup.

===== Round 1 =====
21 September 2007
18:10

Cardiff Blues (Wales)	32–16	(Scotland) Glasgow Warriors
Try: Gareth Williams; Tal Selley; Nick Macleod; Jamie Roberts (2); Con: Nicky Robinson (2); Pen: Nicky Robinson	Preview; Report; Report; Report	Try: James Eddie; Con: Colin Gregor; Pen: Colin Gregor (3)

Cardiff Arms Park
Attendance: 5,425
Referee: Peter Fitzgibbon (Ireland)

===== Round 2 =====
30 September 2007
15:00

Ospreys (Wales)	37–23	(Scotland) Glasgow Warriors
Try: Lee Byrne (2); Ben Lewis; Con: Shaun Connor (2); Pen: Shaun Connor (4); Drop: Shaun Connor (2)	Preview; Report; Report; Report	Try: Sam Pinder; Colin Shaw; Con: Colin Gregor (2); Pen: Colin Gregor (3)

Liberty Stadium
Attendance: 5,417
Referee: Colin Stanely (Ireland)

===== Round 3 =====
5 October 2007
19:30

Glasgow Warriors (Scotland)	16–15	(Ireland) Connacht
Try: Johnnie Beattie; Con: Colin Gregor; Pen: Colin Gregor (3)	Preview; Report; Report; Report	Pen: Tim Donnelly (3); Drop: Tim Donnelly (2)

Firhill Stadium
Attendance: 1,226
Referee: Phil Fear (Wales)

===== Round 4 =====
12 October 2007
19:30

Glasgow Warriors (Scotland)	21–17	(Ireland) Leinster
Try: Bernardo Stortoni; Hefin O'Hare; Moray Low; Pen: Colin Gregor; Drop: Colin Gregor	Preview; Report; Report; Report	Try: Cian Healy; Pen: Johnny Sexton (3); Drop: Johnny Sexton

Firhill Stadium
Attendance: 1,580
Referee: Hugh Watkins (WRU)

===== Round 5 =====
26 October 2007
19:30

Glasgow Warriors (Scotland)	11–11	(Ireland) Munster
Try: Lome Fa'atau; Pen: Dan Parks (2)	Preview; Report; Report; Report	Try: Lifeimi Mafi; Pen: Paul Warwick (2)

Firhill Stadium
Attendance: 1,829
Referee: James Jones (WRU)

===== Round 6 =====
2 November 2007
19:30

Glasgow Warriors (Scotland)	25–6	(Ireland) Ulster
Try: Andrew Henderson; Con: Dan Parks; Pen: Dan Parks (6)	Preview; Report; Report; Report	Try: David Humphreys (2)

Firhill Stadium
Attendance: 2,631
Referee: Andrew Small (RFU)

===== Round 7 =====
23 November 2007
19:30

Glasgow Warriors (Scotland)	17–5	(Wales) Cardiff Blues
Try: Dan Parks; Pen: Dan Parks (3); Drop: Dan Parks	Preview; Report; Report; Report	Try: Rhys Williams

Firhill Stadium
Attendance: 1,638
Referee: Alan Lewis (IRFU)

===== Round 8 =====
30 November 2007
18:30

Connacht (Ireland)	10–6	(Scotland) Glasgow Warriors
Try: Adrian Flavin; Con: Andrew Dunne; Pen: Andrew Dunne	Preview; Report; Report; Report	Pen: Dan Parks (2)

Sportsground
Attendance: 1,145
Referee: Neil Ballard (Wales)

===== Round 9: 1872 Cup (1st Leg) =====
28 December 2007
19:30

Edinburgh (Scotland)	35–31	(Scotland) Glasgow Warriors
	Report

Murrayfield
Attendance: 6,225
Referee: Andrew Small (RFU)

===== Round 10 =====
4 January 2008
19:30

Glasgow Warriors (Scotland)	16–18	(Wales) Newport Gwent Dragons
	Report

Firhill Stadium
Attendance: 1,798

===== Round 11 =====
15 February 2008
19:10

Llanelli Scarlets (Wales)	30–7	(Scotland) Glasgow Warriors
	Report

Stradey Park
Attendance: 6,190

===== Round 12 =====
29 February 2008
19:30

Glasgow Warriors (Scotland)	9–6	(Wales) Ospreys
	Report

Firhill Stadium
Attendance: 2,058

===== Round 13 =====
21 March 2008
19:30

Leinster (Ireland)	34–18	(Scotland) Glasgow Warriors
	Report

Royal Dublin Society
Attendance: 11,730

===== Round 14 =====
30 March 2008
16:05

Newport Gwent Dragons (Wales)	14–20	(Scotland) Glasgow Warriors
	Report

Rodney Parade
Attendance: 5,949

===== Round 15: 1872 Cup (2nd Leg) =====
11 April 2008
20:00

Glasgow Warriors (Scotland)	23–14	(Scotland) Edinburgh
	Report

Firhill Stadium
Attendance: 4,731
Referee: Jérôme Garcès (France)

Glasgow Warriors won the 1872 Cup with an aggregate score of 54–49.

===== Round 16 =====
18 April 2008
19:30

Glasgow Warriors (Scotland)	25–23	(Wales) Llanelli Scarlets
	Report

Firhill Stadium
Attendance: 2,012

===== Round 17 =====
3 May 2008
15:00

Ulster (Ireland)	24–35	(Scotland) Glasgow Warriors
	Report

Ravenhill
Attendance: 6,592

===== Round 18 =====
10 May 2008
17:00

Munster (Ireland)	18–21	(Scotland) Glasgow Warriors
	Report

Musgrave Park
Attendance: 5,360
