= David Jordan (rugby union) =

Former CEO of Glasgow Warriors

David Jordan is a former CEO of the Glasgow Warriors, a professional Scottish rugby union club playing in the Pro14. He is now the tournament director of the Pro14 league.

Jordan started as the chief executive officer of Glasgow Rugby in July 1997. After six weeks in the post there was an office, a receptionist and a spiritual home in Scotstoun.

He was quoted as wanting more autonomy from the SRU in buying players: "Once we get into the European season as such, I want to start concentrating on the strategic objectives of Glasgow rugby. Those are long-term and to be worked in partnership with the clubs." But to do that, he argues, Glasgow needs more autonomy from the SRU to prepare properly.

"I intend to work closely with the clubs to identify talent to bring into the city," he says. "I want to get together with the clubs and form a shopping list of players, for example exiles, who would strengthen Glasgow rugby. We want to promote Glasgow rugby and ensure more competitive clubs are at the top level. We will target players together with clubs and offer them packages. That is to happen more next year because the registration period for players for this year has passed. But I hope that the district can get more autonomy from the SRU."

"At present, all players' contracts are negotiated centrally with the SRU. I hope that the district will be able to negotiate directly with players, for if we wish to bring in top players, and use the combined power of clubs and districts to do that, then we need to have more say in the matter," says Jordan. "Whatever we do, we have to do it hand in hand with the clubs in our district."

He bemoaned the nomadic existence of the Glasgow club as Glasgow Rugby and Glasgow Caledonians. "As a team whether as Glasgow or Glasgow Caledonians we have trained at Stirling, Dalziel, Scotstoun, Hughenden and Whitecraigs, and played games in Aberdeen, Inverness, Perth, Stirling, Ayr, Hughenden, Firhill and Scotstoun, and while we’ve worked hard recently to make Hughenden a home we’re only there on match days and the players, physios, admin staff etc are scattered all over the place."

Jordan was to fall victim to cost cutting at the SRU and lost his job in January 2005.

Despite that he hoped that his involvement in getting Scotstoun to be re-developed as a sporting facility would ultimately benefit Glasgow Warriors. "Because we have been closely involved for the past two years we have been able to help with a design which has cut the athletics track from ten lanes to eight, and ensured there are no long jump pits in front of the stand, to really get supporters as close to the rugby as possible, and while there is still a bit to go yet before it is finalised, if it was up and running as planned in 2007 I'd feel quite proud of the work we've done."

The deals that Jordan worked on, involved Glasgow Warriors being given full operational and commercial control as anchor tenants of a Scotstoun Stadium, with a 6078 capacity, in 2007 – and a short term move to Firhill. "We've been working hard on this project with Glasgow City Council over the past two years and it is very exciting for professional rugby here. It will give us a home we can call our own and a single location we can use for all Glasgow representative matches – at age grade as well as pro level – along with an administrative and training base. The SRU have been involved in the discussions all the way down the line, because we cannot sign anything as Glasgow Rugby."

Although Scottish Rugby appointed Charles Shaw as Glasgow Warriors chairman in October 2006, it was left to 2007 that another CEO was appointed to run the club, replacing Jordan. Ian Riddoch became the Warriors new CEO in July 2007, after first being appointed as interim general manager in June 2007.

On leaving the Glasgow Warriors as CEO, Jordan was appointed tournament director of the Celtic League in February 2005 and – after that evolved into the Pro12 League – became the tournament director of the Pro12; still his present role.
