= Callum Reid =

Callum Reid may refer to:

- Callum Reid (rugby union, born 1992), Scottish rugby union and rugby sevens player
- Callum Reid (rugby union, born 1999), Irish rugby union player
