= Jamie Ritchie =

Scotland international rugby union player (born 1996)

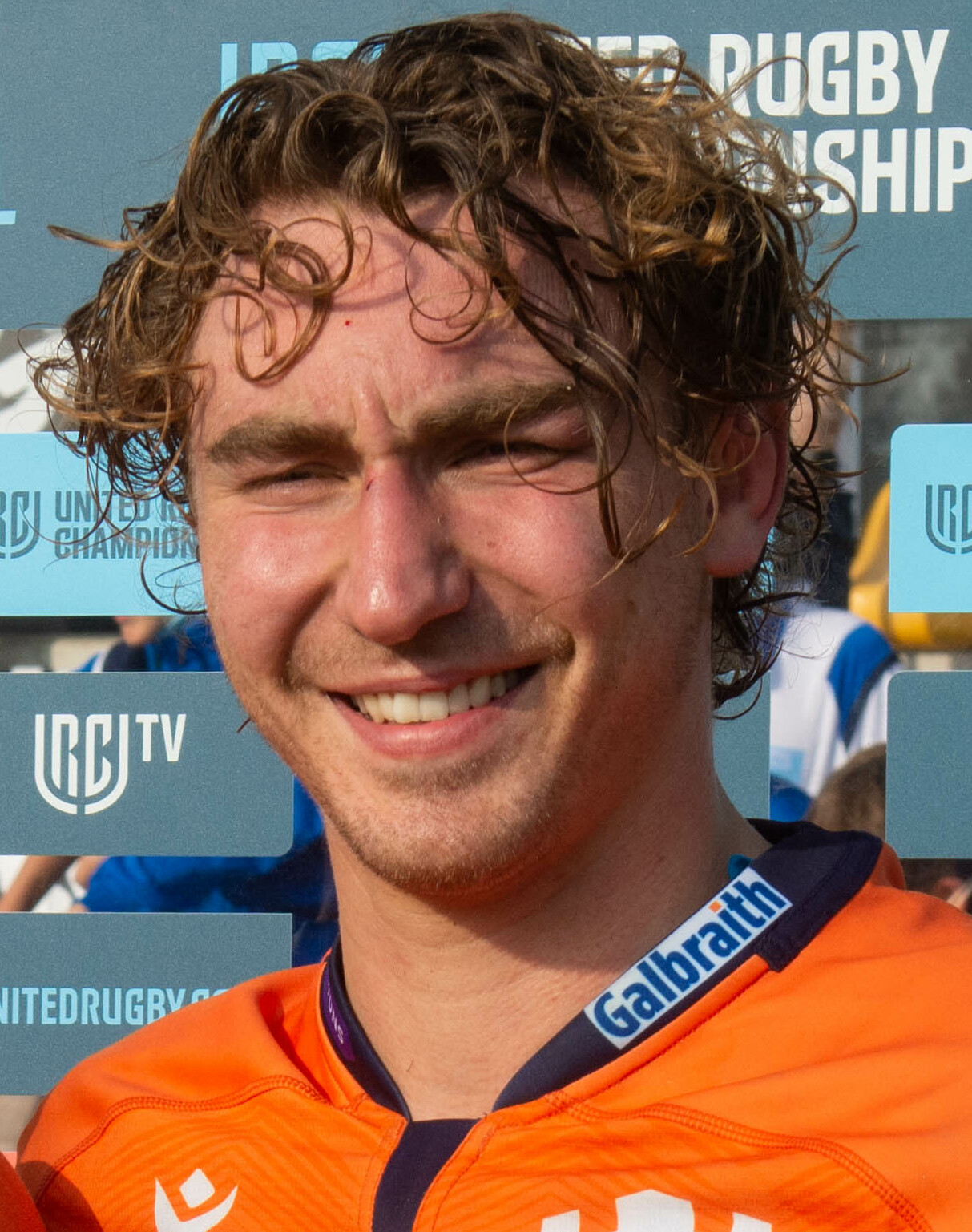
- Ritchie representing Edinburgh in 2021
- Full name: James Thomas Ritchie
- Born: 16 August 1996 (age 30) Dundee, Scotland
- Height: 1.93 m (6 ft 4 in)
- Weight: 109 kg (240 lb; 17 st 2 lb)
- School: Madras College; Strathallan School

Rugby union career
- Position: Flanker
- Current team: Glasgow Warriors
Senior career
Years	Team	Apps	(Points)
2014–25	Edinburgh	133	(50)
2025–26	Perpignan	15	(0)
2026-	Glasgow Warriors	2	(0)
- Correct as of 30 October 2026
International career
Years	Team	Apps	(Points)
2013	Scotland U18s	15	(0)
2014–2016	Scotland U20s	18	(25)
2018–	Scotland	63	(15)
- Correct as of 18 November 2026

James Thomas Ritchie (born 16 August 1996) is a Scottish professional rugby union player who plays as a flanker for Glasgow Warriors and the Scotland national team. He previously played for Top 14 side USA Perpignan and the United Rugby Championship side Edinburgh Rugby.

== Early life ==
Jamie Ritchie started his rugby career while being brought up in the city of Dundee. One of his idols is Dundee-born Andy Nicol.

Outside rugby, he was a silver medalist at the British Judo Championships in 2009, the British independent schools judo champion in 2010 and played first XI cricket at his school.

== Club career ==
While still a teenager, Ritchie made his first-team debut in October 2014 with an appearance from the replacements' bench in the Pro12 match against Leinster. In January 2021, Ritchie signed the longest deal in Edinburgh's history, with head coach Richard Cockerill describing Ritchie as a future Scotland captain. "“Jamie is an excellent young player with an old head on his shoulders. He has a really bright future ahead of him and we’re delighted he’s signed such a long-term deal. His work-rate is immense but it’s the quality of work within that which sets him apart," Cockerill said.

On 6 February 2025, it was confirmed that Ritchie would leave Edinburgh to join French side Perpignan in the Top 14 from the 2025-26 season.

In May 2026 it was confirmed that Ritchie would join Glasgow Warriors for the 2026-27 season. His first competitive match for the Warriors came against Benetton Treviso in Italy on 24 October 2026. The Warriors ground out a tight bonus point victory against the Italian side, winning 24 points to 20 points. Ritchie became Glasgow Warrior No. 382.

== International career ==
Ritchie has represented Scotland at under-16, under-18 and under-20. He played in the 2013 and 2014 European Under-18 Rugby Union Championship, the latter as captain. In June 2014 he played four matches for Scotland under-20 at the 2014 IRB Junior World Championship.

Ritchie received his first call up to the senior Scotland squad by coach Gregor Townsend in October 2017 for the autumn internationals. Ritchie received his first senior cap against Canada on the 9 June 2018 in a 48–10 victory.

Ritchie was picked in Scotland's 2019 Rugby World Cup squad. However he fractured his cheekbone in the last warm-up match for Scotland against Georgia.

Ritchie received player of the match in Scotland's match against France in the 2020 Six Nations, after getting punched by France prop Mohamed Haouas During this game Mohamed Haouas was sent off for dangerous play in the 37th minute for punching Ritchie. He once again won a 2020 Six Nations player of the match award, this time against Wales in a 14–10 victory. It was Scotland's first win on Welsh soil since 2002.

In October 2022 Ritchie was named as the captain of the Scottish squad for the 2022 end-of-year rugby union internationals. In 2023 Ritchie was selected in Scotland's 33-player squad for the 2023 Rugby World Cup in France.

Awards and achievements
Previous: Darcy Graham	Sir Willie Purves Quaich; 2020	Next: Scott Cummings
