= Sophie Anderson (rugby union) =

- Born: 4 April 1998 (age 28) Mintlaw, Scotland
- Height: 1.83 m (6 ft 0 in)
- Weight: 90 kg (200 lb; 14 st 2 lb)

Rugby union career
- Position: Flanker
Senior career
Years	Team	Apps	(Points)
- Garioch
- Hillhead Jordanhill
- Watsonians Ladies
Provincial / State sides
Years	Team	Apps	(Points)
2023	Glasgow Warriors Women	1	(0)
International career
Years	Team	Apps	(Points)
2019–22	Scotland		

Sophie Anderson (born 4 April 1998) is a Scotland international rugby union player.

== Rugby Union career ==
=== Club career ===
She first played with Garioch, after playing football with Buchan Ladies FC.

On her move to Glasgow in 2017 she was invited to train with West of Scotland, but she later joined Hillhead Jordanhill.

She now plays with Watsonians Ladies.

=== Provincial career ===
She was selected for the Glasgow Warriors Women side for their first Celtic Challenge match, against Edinburgh Rugby Women on 30 December 2023. She became Glasgow Warriors No. 17. Edinburgh won the match 28–12.

=== International career ===
She has been capped for Scotland from 2019 to 2022.

== Medical career ==
She moved to Glasgow in 2017 to study midwifery. Anderson is a midwife.
