= Mark McMillan =

Scottish rugby union player (born 1983)

- Born: Mark McMillan; 17 May 1983 (age 43) Stirling, Scotland
- Height: 1.80 m (5 ft 11 in)
- Weight: 89 kg (14 st 0 lb)
- School: Dunblane High School

Rugby union career
- Position: Scrum-half
Senior career
| Years | Team | Apps | (Points) |
| 2003–04 | Glasgow | | |
| 2004-06 | Leeds Carnegie | 32 | (20) |
| 2006-08 | London Wasps | 36 | (10) |
| 2008-10 | Glasgow | 48 | (10) |
| 2010- | Bath Rugby | 46 | (5) |
International career
| Years | Team | Apps | (Points) |
| 2007–2013 | Scotland A | 17 | (10) |

5th Sir Willie Purves Quaich
- In office 2004–2004
- Preceded by: Chris Cusiter
- Succeeded by: Stuart Corsar

Mark McMillan (born 17 May 1983 in Stirling, Scotland) is a former rugby union player who played for Bath Rugby, London Wasps and Leeds Carnegie in the Aviva Premiership, and Glasgow Warriors in the Pro14. During his time at Wasps, he helped them win both the Heineken Cup and the English Premiership, coming off the bench in both finals. At Leeds he also won the 2004–05 Powergen Cup.

He was called up to the senior Scotland training squad in October 2008, however he was ultimately not capped at that level.

McMillan's position of choice is as at scrum-half.

== Honours ==
- Powergen Cup/Anglo-Welsh Cup titles: 1
  - 2005
- Heineken Cup titles: 1
  - 2006–07
- Premiership titles: 1
  - 2007–08
