= Ben Prescott =

Scottish rugby union player (b. 1978)

- Born: Benjamin Gaddafi Prescott; 31 July 1978 (age 48) Tripoli, Libya
- Height: 1.84 m (6 ft 0 in)
- Weight: 117 kg (18 st 6 lb)
- School: Gordonstoun
- University: Aberdeen University

Rugby union career
- Position: Tighthead Prop
Amateur team(s)
Years	Team	Apps	(Points)
- Aberdeen GSFP
–	Blackrock College		
Senior career
Years	Team	Apps	(Points)
2001–08	Glasgow Warriors	21	(0)
2006–07	→Waterloo		
2007–08	→Rotherham Titans		
2008–10	Rotherham Titans		
2010	Nottingham		
2010	Leinster		
2010	→Rotherham Titans		
2010–11	Northampton Saints		
2011–12	Nottingham		
2012–14	Cornish Pirates		
2014–15	London Scottish		
International career
Years	Team	Apps	(Points)
- Scotland U18

Ben Prescott (born 31 July 1978 in Tripoli, Libya) is a Libyan-born Scottish former rugby union player for Glasgow Warriors at the Tighthead Prop position.

== Amateur career ==
Prescott played for Aberdeen GSFP. He also played for Blackrock College RFC when based in Ireland with Leinster in 2010.

== Professional career ==
Prescott started playing for Glasgow Warriors in the 2001–02 season under Richie Dixon. His first match was the pre-season friendly against Northampton Saints where he came on as a substitute on 14 August 2001.

He also played in competitive matches. His first competitive appearance was against Cardiff RFC in the Heineken Cup replacing Dave Hilton on 4 November 2001 at Hughenden Stadium. He played in the Welsh-Scottish League against Edinburgh Rugby, coming on as a temporary replacement for Steve Griffiths on 22 February 2002 He did not play for the Warriors again until season 2004–05. He signed full-time for the Warriors in 2005. In the following season, 2006–07, a calf injury restricted his Warriors appearances. He went out on loan to Waterloo for more game time. The 2007–08 season was his last as a Warrior.

The 2007–08 season saw Prescott on a loan to Rotherham Titans. This move was made permanent on 23 May 2008. He left the Titans to join Nottingham RFC in May 2010. He then moved on to Leinster in September 2010. He rejoined the Titans on loan in early December 2010 when their prop Anton O'Donnell broke his ankle. That move was brief as he moved on a short-term deal to Northampton Saints at the end of December 2010. He rejoined Nottingham for season 2011–12. In May 2012 he signed for the Cornish Pirates. He rejected a new contract in the summer of 2014 and was released. Instead, Prescott signed for London Scottish for the 2014–15 season. He announced his retirement from the game in September 2015 due to a neck and shoulder injury.

== International career ==
Prescott played for Scotland U18s, Scottish Universities and Scottish Students.
