= Lucy Winter =

- Born: 26 March 1995 (age 31)
- Height: 1.72 m (5 ft 7 1/2 in)
- Weight: 70 kg (150 lb; 11 st 0 lb)

Rugby union career
- Position: Flanker
Senior career
Years	Team	Apps	(Points)
2017-20	Watsonians		
2017	Edinburgh University		
2020-22	Sale Sharks Women		
2023-	Durham Sharks		
Provincial / State sides
Years	Team	Apps	(Points)
2023	Glasgow Warriors Women	6	(0)
International career
Years	Team	Apps	(Points)
2018–22	Scotland		

Lucy Winter (born 26 March 1995) is a Scotland international rugby union player.

== Rugby Union career ==
=== Club career ===
From Kirriemuir High School she joined Watsonians.

At university she played for Edinburgh University. She won the British Universities & Colleges Sport Championship in 2017 with the club.

She played for Sale Sharks Women from 2020 to 2022.

She moved to play for Durham Sharks in 2023.

=== Provincial career ===
She was selected for the Glasgow Warriors Women side for their first Celtic Challenge match, against Edinburgh Rugby Women on 30 December 2023. She became Glasgow Warriors No. 8. Edinburgh won the match 28–12.

=== International career ===
She has been capped for Scotland from 2018 to 2022. She made her debut against Italy on 4 November 2018.
