= Garioch RFC =

Scottish rugby union club, based in Inverurie

- Full name: Garioch Rugby Club Football Club
- Nickname: Super Garioch
- Founded: 1977
- Location: Inverurie, Scotland
- Ground: Kellands Park
- League(s): Men: Caledonia North Two; Women: Scottish Womens Premiership
- 2024–25: Men: Caledonia North Two; Women: Scottish Womens Premiership, 7th of 8
Team kit

Official website
- www.gariochrfc.org

Garioch RFC is a rugby union club based in Inverurie, Scotland. The Men's team currently plays in Caledonia North Two. The Women's team currently plays in the Scottish Womens Premiership league.

== History ==
It was founded in 1977. On 11 February 1977 the Aberdeen Press and Journal reported:

Two Aberdeenshire stalwarts Jim Black and 3rd XV captain John Fraser are behind the move and to gauge likely interest they have organised a meeting in the Kintore Arms Hotel in Inverurie on Monday week at 8pm. Dr Black stated: "I have been approached by several incomers to the area who are interested in starting a club. With the example of Mackie Academy F.P. getting off the ground at Stonehaven, we are encouraged to think the same at Inverurie. We have been assured that there is space for a rugby pitch at the town's Pleasure Park and we are also pleased to note that rugby is now being offered to first year pupils at Inverurie Academy and it has now caught on."

On the 28 March 1977 the first general meeting of the rugby club was held in the local Kintore Arms pub and Pat Mitchell was elected the club president. Mitchell died in April 2021.

The rugby club serves the rural Aberdeenshire area; and in particular the towns of Inverurie, Oldmeldrum, Kemnay, Kintore and Kinellar.

The Men's side started in the Aberdeen and District League, before moving to the North District League and when the SRU restructured the leagues were in the Caledonia Regional Leagues.

Well equipped, it has a full suite of changing rooms for 4 teams beside 2 pitches, which are full sized and with drainage; together with a flood-lit training area.

The men's side played an annual match with the 'Oil Blacks' - a group of Southern Hemisphere players based in Aberdeen.

== Sides ==
Garioch runs various age grade sections for boys and girls, along with its men's and women's sides. It provides free school coaching. The club's junior training was announced on 12 August 1999, with SRU qualified coaches training boys and girls.

Its women's side is currently much more successful than the men's side, playing at a much higher national tier; and is coached by former Scotland 'A' international Stuart Corsar.

Coaches Stuart Corsar, Anna Newsome and Courtni Fritts won the Scottish Rugby Union Diversity and Inclusion Award in June 2021 for setting up the Garioch girls side.

== Garioch Sevens ==
The club runs the Garioch Sevens tournament. It has both men's and women's competitions.

The tournament began in 1978.

== Honours ==
=== Men's ===
- Midlands District League
  - Champions (1): 1984
- Mackie Academy F.P. Sevens
  - Champions (1): 1979

== Notable former players ==
=== Men ===
==== Glasgow Warriors ====
The following former Garioch players have represented Glasgow Warriors at professional level.

- (Scotland) Stuart Corsar
- (Scotland) Seb Stephen

==== Scotland 'A' ====
The following former Garioch players have represented Scotland 'A' at international level.

- (Scotland) Stuart Corsar

Tim McKay was a Scotland Schoolboy internationalist.

Garioch rugby stalwart Tommy Robertson, who died at the age of 89 in 1996, played for the first Aberdeen Exiles versus Select match at Rubislaw in 1929.

=== Women ===
==== Glasgow Warriors ====
The following former Garioch players have represented Glasgow Warriors at provincial level.

- (Scotland) Sophie Anderson

==== Scotland ====
The following former Garioch players have represented Scotland at international level.

- (Scotland) Sophie Anderson
