= List of Glasgow Warriors Women players =

List of Glasgow Warriors Women rugby union players is a list of people who have played for Glasgow Warriors Women from 2023 season to present.

This list only includes players who have played in a competitive match for the provincial club in the tournaments listed below. Other provincial players for the club may be found in the broader Category:Glasgow Warriors Women players.

A player's nationality shown is taken from the nationality at the highest honour for the national side obtained; or if never capped internationally their place of birth. Senior caps take precedence over junior caps or place of birth; junior caps take precedence over place of birth. A player's nationality at debut may be different from the nationality shown. Combination sides like the British and Irish Lions or Pacific Islanders are not national sides, or nationalities.

Players in BOLD font have been capped by their senior international XV side as nationality shown.

Players in Italic font have capped either by their international 7s side; or by the international XV 'A' side as nationality shown.

Players in normal font have not been capped at senior level.

A position in parentheses indicates that the player debuted as a substitute. A player may have made a prior debut for Glasgow Warriors in a non-competitive match, 'A' match or 7s match; these matches are not listed.

Tournaments where competitive debut made:

**Celtic Challenge**

Number	Player nationality	Name	Position	Date of debut	Venue	Stadium	Opposition nationality	Opposition side	Tournament	Match result	Scoring debut
1	(Scotland)	Ailie Tucker	Prop	2023-12-30	Away	Edinburgh Rugby Stadium	(Scotland)	Edinburgh Rugby Women	Celtic Challenge	Loss	5pts
2	(Scotland)	Nikki Simpson	Hooker	2023-12-30	Away	Edinburgh Rugby Stadium	(Scotland)	Edinburgh Rugby Women	Celtic Challenge	Loss	Nil
3	(Scotland)	Eilidh Fleming	Prop	2023-12-30	Away	Edinburgh Rugby Stadium	(Scotland)	Edinburgh Rugby Women	Celtic Challenge	Loss	Nil
4	(Scotland)	Emma Turner	Lock	2023-12-30	Away	Edinburgh Rugby Stadium	(Scotland)	Edinburgh Rugby Women	Celtic Challenge	Loss	Nil
5	(Scotland)	**Louise McMillan**	Lock	2023-12-30	Away	Edinburgh Rugby Stadium	(Scotland)	Edinburgh Rugby Women	Celtic Challenge	Loss	5pts
6	(Scotland)	Holland Bogan	Flanker	2023-12-30	Away	Edinburgh Rugby Stadium	(Scotland)	Edinburgh Rugby Women	Celtic Challenge	Loss	Nil
7	(Scotland)	Izzy Hannah	Flanker	2023-12-30	Away	Edinburgh Rugby Stadium	(Scotland)	Edinburgh Rugby Women	Celtic Challenge	Loss	Nil
8	(Scotland)	**Lucy Winter**	No. 8	2023-12-30	Away	Edinburgh Rugby Stadium	(Scotland)	Edinburgh Rugby Women	Celtic Challenge	Loss	Nil
9	(Scotland)	Rhea Clarke	Scrum half	2023-12-30	Away	Edinburgh Rugby Stadium	(Scotland)	Edinburgh Rugby Women	Celtic Challenge	Loss	Nil
10	(Scotland)	Ceitidh Ainsworth	Fly half	2023-12-30	Away	Edinburgh Rugby Stadium	(Scotland)	Edinburgh Rugby Women	Celtic Challenge	Loss	Nil
11	(Scotland)	Roma Fraser	Wing	2023-12-30	Away	Edinburgh Rugby Stadium	(Scotland)	Edinburgh Rugby Women	Celtic Challenge	Loss	Nil
12	(Scotland)	Lucy MacRae	Centre	2023-12-30	Away	Edinburgh Rugby Stadium	(Scotland)	Edinburgh Rugby Women	Celtic Challenge	Loss	2 pts
13	(Scotland)	Claudia McLaren	Centre	2023-12-30	Away	Edinburgh Rugby Stadium	(Scotland)	Edinburgh Rugby Women	Celtic Challenge	Loss	Nil
14	(Scotland)	Sky Phimister	Wing	2023-12-30	Away	Edinburgh Rugby Stadium	(Scotland)	Edinburgh Rugby Women	Celtic Challenge	Loss	Nil
15	(Scotland)	Izzy McGuire-Evans	Full back	2023-12-30	Away	Edinburgh Rugby Stadium	(Scotland)	Edinburgh Rugby Women	Celtic Challenge	Loss	Nil
16	(Scotland)	Pearl Kellie	(Full back)	2023-12-30	Away	Edinburgh Rugby Stadium	(Scotland)	Edinburgh Rugby Women	Celtic Challenge	Loss	Nil
17	(Scotland)	**Sophie Anderson**	(Flanker)	2023-12-30	Away	Edinburgh Rugby Stadium	(Scotland)	Edinburgh Rugby Women	Celtic Challenge	Loss	Nil
18	(Scotland)	**Mairi McDonald**	(Scrum half)	2023-12-30	Away	Edinburgh Rugby Stadium	(Scotland)	Edinburgh Rugby Women	Celtic Challenge	Loss	Nil
19	(Scotland)	Carla McDonald	(Fly half)	2023-12-30	Away	Edinburgh Rugby Stadium	(Scotland)	Edinburgh Rugby Women	Celtic Challenge	Loss	Nil
20	(Scotland)	Debbie Lee	(Prop)	2023-12-30	Away	Edinburgh Rugby Stadium	(Scotland)	Edinburgh Rugby Women	Celtic Challenge	Loss	Nil
21	(Scotland)	Eve Thomson	(Lock)	2023-12-30	Away	Edinburgh Rugby Stadium	(Scotland)	Edinburgh Rugby Women	Celtic Challenge	Loss	Nil
22	(Scotland)	Karis Craig	(Prop)	2023-12-30	Away	Edinburgh Rugby Stadium	(Scotland)	Edinburgh Rugby Women	Celtic Challenge	Loss	Nil
23	(Scotland)	Kaylee Fraser	(Hooker)	2023-12-30	Away	Edinburgh Rugby Stadium	(Scotland)	Edinburgh Rugby Women	Celtic Challenge	Loss	Nil
24	(Scotland)	Demi Swann	Prop	2024-01-07	Away	Cardiff Arms Park	(Wales)	Gwalia Lightning	Celtic Challenge	Loss	Nil
25	(Scotland)	Ellie Williamson	Lock	2024-01-07	Away	Cardiff Arms Park	(Wales)	Gwalia Lightning	Celtic Challenge	Loss	Nil
26	(Scotland)	Alex Love	No. 8	2024-01-07	Away	Cardiff Arms Park	(Wales)	Gwalia Lightning	Celtic Challenge	Loss	Nil
27	(Scotland)	Kiyomi Honjigawa	Full Back	2024-01-07	Away	Cardiff Arms Park	(Wales)	Gwalia Lightning	Celtic Challenge	Loss	Nil
28	(Scotland)	Chloe Brown	(Prop)	2024-01-07	Away	Cardiff Arms Park	(Wales)	Gwalia Lightning	Celtic Challenge	Loss	Nil
29	(Scotland)	Giselle Chicot	(Centre)	2024-01-07	Away	Cardiff Arms Park	(Wales)	Gwalia Lightning	Celtic Challenge	Loss	Nil
30	(Scotland)	Phaedra Snailham	Wing	2024-01-13	Home	Scotstoun Stadium	(Ireland)	Wolfhounds	Celtic Challenge	Loss	5 pts
31	(Scotland)	**Beth Blacklock**	Centre	2024-01-27	Home	Scotstoun Stadium	(Ireland)	Clovers	Celtic Challenge	Loss	5 pts
32	(Scotland)	Megan Hyland	(No. 8)	2024-01-27	Home	Scotstoun Stadium	(Ireland)	Clovers	Celtic Challenge	Loss	Nil
33	(Scotland)	Aicha Sutcliffe	(Hooker)	2024-02-04	Away	Stadiwm CSM	(Wales)	Brython Thunder	Celtic Challenge	Loss	Nil
34	(Scotland)	Alison Orr	(Flanker)	2024-02-04	Away	Stadiwm CSM	(Wales)	Brython Thunder	Celtic Challenge	Loss	Nil
35	(Scotland)	**Coreen Grant**	Wing	2024-02-17	Home	Scotstoun Stadium	(Wales)	Brython Thunder	Celtic Challenge	Loss	Nil
36	(Scotland)	Rebekah Douglas	(Scrum Half)	2024-02-17	Home	Scotstoun Stadium	(Wales)	Brython Thunder	Celtic Challenge	Loss	Nil
