= Sir Willie Purves Quaich =

Rugby union award

- Sport: Rugby Union
- Awarded for: Young Scottish player of the season
- Sponsored by: Friends of Scottish Rugby
- Country: Scotland

History
- First award: 2000
- First winner: Donnie Macfadyen
- Website: www.f-s-r.org/content/pages/trophies.html

The Sir Willie Purves Quaich is an annual rugby union award given to the "most outstanding young male Scottish player" of that season. The quaich is named for Sir Willie Purves, a notable Scottish banker who was a chairman of the HSBC bank. First awarded in 2000, Donnie Macfadyen was the initial recipient.

== The Quaich ==
The Quaich is presented by the Friends of Scottish Rugby organisation annually. The award was originally held to be for the youngest male Scottish player likely to be capped by the full senior Scotland team. However, since these young players are now often already capped internationally, the award has morphed into a "Young Scottish Player of the Season" type of award.

The Sir Willie Purves Quaich is one of three awards presented by the Friends of Scottish Rugby organisation, the others being the Sir Tommy Macpherson Quaich (presented to the most promising young player at London Scottish that season) and the Lady Jean Macpherson Trophy (presented to the most aspiring female Scottish player).

=== Friends of Scottish Rugby ===
The Friends of Scottish Rugby organisation exists to support grass-roots rugby in Scotland. They give out various grants to clubs in Scotland; these grants are also available to London Scottish as an SRU member. Over the last 20 years, their grants to these clubs have exceeded £600,000.

== List of awardees ==
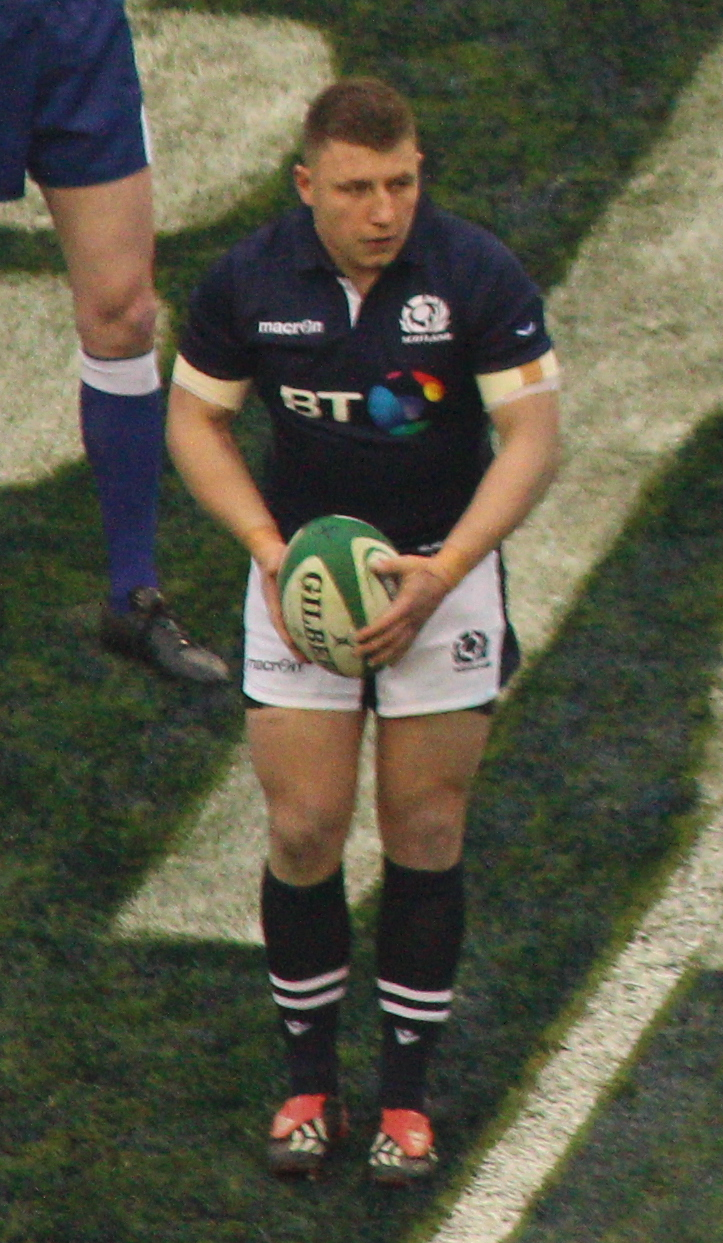
2011 winner Duncan Weir

Holder No.	Name	Year	Club
1	Donnie Macfadyen	2000	Glasgow Warriors
2	Andrew Wilson	2001	Glasgow Warriors
3	Ally Hogg	2002	Edinburgh Rugby
4	Chris Cusiter	2003	Border Reivers
5	Mark McMillan	2004	Glasgow Warriors
6	Stuart Corsar	2005	Glasgow Warriors
7	James Eddie	2006	Glasgow Warriors
8	Moray Low	2007	Glasgow Warriors
9	Sean Crombie	2008	Edinburgh Rugby
10	Richie Gray	2009	Glasgow Warriors
11	Alex Blair	2010	Edinburgh Rugby
12	Duncan Weir	2011	Glasgow Warriors
13	David Denton	2012	Edinburgh Rugby
14	Sean Kennedy	2013	Edinburgh Rugby
15	Jonny Gray	2014	Glasgow Warriors
16	Finn Russell	2015	Glasgow Warriors
17	Mark Bennett	2016	Glasgow Warriors
18	Magnus Bradbury	2017	Edinburgh Rugby
19	Matt Fagerson	2018	Glasgow Warriors
20	Darcy Graham	2019	Edinburgh Rugby
21	Jamie Ritchie	2020	Edinburgh Rugby
22	Scott Cummings	2021	Glasgow Warriors
23	Rory Darge	2022	Glasgow Warriors
24	Luke Crosbie	2023	Edinburgh Rugby
25	Harry Paterson	2024	Edinburgh Rugby
26	Max Williamson	2025	Glasgow Warriors
