= Denford Mutamangira =

Zimbabwean rugby union player

- Born: Denford Mutamangira; 5 June 1984 (age 42) Zimbabwe
- Height: 6 ft 1 in (1.85 m)
- Weight: 115 kg (18 st 2 lb)

Rugby union career
- Position: Tighthead Prop
Amateur team(s)
Years	Team	Apps	(Points)
2004-2012	Harare Sports Club		
2012-2014	Ayr RFC		
2014-2015	Harare Sports Club		
Senior career
Years	Team	Apps	(Points)
2013	Glasgow Warriors		
2015	Sharks		
International career
Years	Team	Apps	(Points)
- Zimbabwe

Denford Mutamangira is a Zimbabwean rugby union player and captain of the Zimbabwe national side. He plays at the Tighthead Prop position or at Loosehead.

== Rugby Union career ==
=== Amateur career ===
Mutamangira began his rugby career playing for Harare Sports Club in Zimbabwe in 2004.

He moved to Scotland where he played for the BT Premiership side Ayr RFC in 2012. Ayr was to win the RBS league title and RBS Scottish Cup and RBS Team of the Season in 2012-2013.

He moved back to Zimbabwe in 2014 and once again played for Harare Sports Club.

=== Professional career ===
During the 2013-14 season he was part of the back-up squad for Glasgow Warriors. He played in their pre-season friendly match against Aberdeen GSFP. He was named as part of Glasgow Warriors 38 man Heineken Cup squad in that season.

On the 18 June 2015 it was announced that Mutamangira would be training with the South African Super Rugby side, the Durban Sharks ahead of the Currie Cup. He was scheduled to play for the Sharks against Xerox Golden Lions but was sidelined with a strained knee.

=== International career ===
He won the Africa Cup with Zimbabwe in 2014.

The prop was named captain of the Zimbabwe national team on 7 June 2015.
