= Sean Crombie =

Scottish rugby union player

- Born: Sean Crombie; 25 June 1986 (age 40) Kirkcaldy, Scotland
- Height: 1.78 m (5 ft 10 in)
- Weight: 105.6 kg (16 st 9 lb; 233 lb)

Rugby union career
- Position: Hooker
Amateur team(s)
Years	Team	Apps	(Points)
2003–2005, 2023	Kirkcaldy	24	(0)
Senior career
Years	Team	Apps	(Points)
- Border Reivers
–	Edinburgh Rugby		
–	Newcastle Falcons		
International career
Years	Team	Apps	(Points)
- Scotland U19s
–	Scotland U21s		
National sevens team
Years	Team		Comps
- Scotland 7s

9th Sir Willie Purves Quaich
- In office 2008–2008
- Preceded by: Moray Low
- Succeeded by: Richie Gray

Sean Crombie (born 25 June 1986) is a former Scotland 7s international rugby union player. He played at hooker.

== Rugby Union career ==
=== Amateur career ===
He won the Scottish Premiership with Boroughmuir.

Crombie received the first ever U.A.E Player of the Year in 2014 after winning 6 championships in a row with the world-famous Jebel Ali Dragons of Dubai. This was the first of its kind in the country and was hosted by ex Scotland Captain Rory Lawson and guests included Steve Thompson and Jonah Lomu.

He played for Aberdeen GSFP.

=== Professional career ===
He played for Border Reivers.

He played for Edinburgh Rugby in the Celtic League.

He played for Newcastle Falcons.

=== International career ===
He has been capped for the Scotland U19s and Scotland U21s.

He played for Scotland 7s in San Diego, Wellington and Hong Kong.

== Investment career ==
He is now an Investment Assistant at Social Investment Scotland.
