= Aberdeen GSFP RFC =

Scottish rugby union club, based in Aberdeen

(Scotland) Aberdeen Grammar
- Full name: Aberdeen Grammar Rugby Football Club
- Union: SRU
- Founded: 1893; 133 years ago
- Location: Aberdeen, Scotland
- Ground: Rubislaw Playing Fields (Capacity: 5,000 (150 in stand))
- Chairman: Iain Macadie
- President: John Stewart
- Coach: Justin Taljaard
- Captain: Jack Burnett
- League: Scottish National League Division Three
- 2024–25: Scottish National League Division Three, 6th of 9
Team kit

Official website
- aberdeenrugby.org.uk

Aberdeen Grammar School FP RFC, also known as Aberdeen Grammar, are an amateur rugby union club based in Aberdeen, Scotland. They currently compete in the Scottish National League Division Three. The club plays its home games at Rubislaw in the city's west end.

== Notable players ==
Scotland

- Donny Innes
- William Dallas "Dally" Allardice, 1947 to 1949 (8 caps)
- D.W.C. (Doug) Smith, British and Irish Lions player and 1971 tour manager
- E.T.S Michie, the first University of Aberdeen Lions player in the 1955 British Lions tour to South Africa and also in Barbarian FC.
- Robbie Russell (27 caps)
- Andrew Wilson (2 caps)
- Johnnie Beattie
- Moray Low

A number of former players have also gone on to play professional rugby including:

- Stuart Corsar - Glasgow Warriors, Rotherham Titans, Doncaster Knights
- Sean Crombie - Edinburgh Rugby
- Dave Millard - Glasgow Warriors
- Matt Taylor - Edinburgh Rugby, Border Reivers. Current coach for Glasgow Warriors and Scotland
- Ben Prescott - Glasgow Warriors, Rotherham Titans, Nottingham, Leinster, Northampton Saints, Cornish Pirates
- Murray Douglas - Edinburgh Rugby, Melbourne Rebels, Hurricanes, Brumbies and Shizuoka Blue Revs
- Andy Cramond - Toulon, RC Vannes and Biarritz Olympique
- Murray McCallum - Edinburgh Rugby, Worcester Warriors, Glasgow Warriors, Newcastle Redbulls and Scotland
- Hamilton Burr - Glasgow Warriors, Waikato and Chiefs

== Honours ==
- Scottish National League Cup: 2019
- Scottish National League Division Two
  - Champions (1): 1983-84
- Aberdeen University Sevens
  - Champions: 1894
- Aberdeen Sevens
  - Champions: 1946, 1947, 1948, 1949, 1950, 1951, 1955, 1961, 1962, 1963
- Banff Sevens
  - Champions: 1993, 1995
- Ellon Sevens
  - Champions: 1981, 1996
- Garioch Sevens
  - Champions: 1979
- Highland Sevens
  - Champions: 1950, 1955, 1986, 1988, 1995
- Howe of Fife Sevens
  - Champions: 1969
- Mackie Academy F.P. Sevens
  - Champions: 1977, 1982, 1986
- Moray Sevens
  - Champions: 1950, 1951, 1952, 1953, 1955, 1963, 1993, 1995
- Orkney Sevens
  - Champions: 1999, 2000

== Bibliography ==
- Bath, Richard (ed.) The Scotland Rugby Miscellany (Vision Sports Publishing Ltd, 2007 ISBN 1-905326-24-6)
- Godwin, Terry Complete Who's Who of International Rugby (Cassell, 1987, ISBN 0-7137-1838-2)
- Massie, Allan A Portrait of Scottish Rugby (Polygon, Edinburgh; ISBN 0-904919-84-6)
