= Andy Buist =

English rugby union player (born 1984)

Andy Buist (born 25 August 1984 in Norwich, England) is a rugby union player for the Newcastle Falcons in the Guinness Premiership.

Buist's position of choice is as a lock or as a back-row forward.

He signed for London Irish in April 2009 but the move fell through because of a failed medical.
