= Richie Gray (rugby union, born 1989) =

Scottish rugby union player

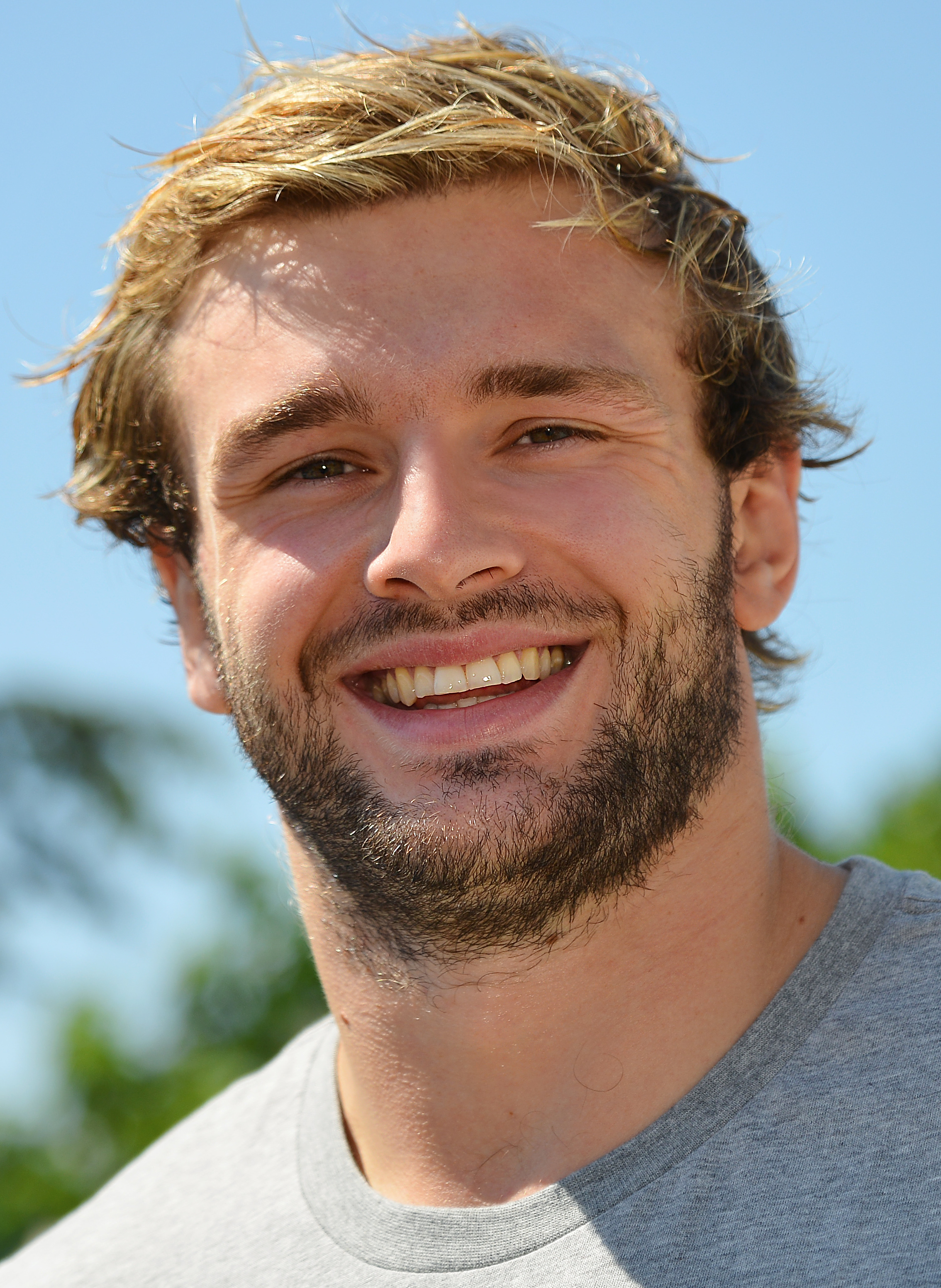
- Gray representing Toulouse
- Full name: Richard James Gray
- Born: 24 August 1989 (age 37) Rutherglen, Lanarkshire, Scotland
- Height: 2.08 m (6 ft 10 in)
- Weight: 126 kg (278 lb; 19 st 12 lb)
- School: Kelvinside Academy
- Notable relative: Jonny Gray (brother)

Rugby union career
- Position: Lock
Senior career
Years	Team	Apps	(Points)
2008–2012, 2020–2024	Glasgow Warriors	110	(25)
2012–2013	Sale Sharks	16	(5)
2013–2016	Castres	65	(10)
2016–2020	Toulouse	66	(10)
2024–2026	Toyota Verblitz	13	(0)
- Correct as of 25 June 2023
International career
Years	Team	Apps	(Points)
2008–2009	Scotland U20	12	(0)
2010–2024	Scotland	79	(15)
2013	British & Irish Lions	1	(0)
- Correct as of 4 February 2024
Coaching career
- Years: Team
- 2026–: Toyota Verblitz (Assistant coach)
- Correct as of 1 September 2026

Richard James Gray (born 24 August 1989) is a Scottish professional rugby union coach and former player. Gray played as a lock for the Glasgow Warriors, Sale Sharks, Castres, Toulouse, and finished his professional career with Japan Rugby League One club Toyota Verblitz. He won 79 caps for the Scotland national team between 2010 and 2024.

== Career ==
Gray played for provincial sides Glasgow Hawks and West of Scotland. He began his professional career at Glasgow Warriors in 2008, and was named in the Pro12 Dream Team at the end of the 2010/11 season. It was announced in November 2011 that Gray would be leaving Glasgow Warriors at the end of the 2011–12 season, having agreed to sign for the Sale Sharks. In May 2013 it was announced that he would leave Sharks and had signed a three-year deal with French team Castres Olympique.

On 24 November 2015, Gray agreed a four-year deal with Top 14 rivals Toulouse from the 2016–17 season. Gray was part of the Toulouse team that won the Top 14 in 2019.

It was announced on 16 January 2020 that Gray would be returning to his original Glaswegian club, Glasgow Warriors, on a two-year deal from the 2020–21 season. Gray was part of the Glasgow team that won the URC Final in 2024.

On 15 October 2024, Gray immediately left Glasgow to travel to Japan to sign for Toyota Verblitz in their Japan Rugby League One competition from the 2024–25 season.

In May 2026, following the end of the 2025–26 Japan Rugby League One season, Gray announced his retirement from rugby.

== International career ==
A former Kelvinside Academy student, Gray has represented Scotland at every age group from under-17 through to the senior sides, winning his first cap as an international as a substitute in the 2010 Six Nations Championship match against France. His first international start came against New Zealand during the 2010 Autumn test series. He scored his first international try in a Six Nations game against Ireland in March 2012, where he smashed through Tommy Bowe and dummied a great pass against Rob Kearney. Gray's 2013 Six Nations got off to a good start with Scotland beating Italy and Ireland, but during the match against Wales at Murrayfield, Edinburgh, he was injured and taken off the field. It was later revealed that he pulled a hamstring and was taken off the pitch as a precaution.

Gray was selected for the 2013 British & Irish Lions tour to Australia, being the tallest on the tour. He played against Combined Country, Brumbies, Reds and Rebels, and went on to play a part in the final test against Australia, being part of a winning Lions series team.

In 2023, Gray was selected in Scotland's 33 player squad for the 2023 Rugby World Cup in France.

== Career statistics ==
As of 24 September 2023.

=== Stats by opposition ===
Opposition	Played	Win	Loss	Draw	Tries	Points	Win %
Argentina	2	1	1	0	1	5	.500
Australia (Note: Includes of one British & Irish Lions test appearance in the 2013 tour to Australia.)	4	2	2	0	0	0	.500
Canada	1	1	0	0	0	0	1.000
England	8	2	6	0	0	0	.250
Fiji	2	2	0	0	0	0	1.000
France	11	2	9	0	0	0	.182
Georgia	2	2	0	0	0	0	1.000
Ireland	9	4	5	0	2	10	.444
Italy	8	7	1	0	0	0	.875
Japan	4	4	0	0	0	0	1.000
New Zealand	4	0	4	0	0	0	.000
Romania	1	1	0	0	0	0	1.000
Samoa	3	3	0	0	0	0	1.000
South Africa	4	1	3	0	0	0	.250
Tonga	3	2	1	0	0	0	.667
United States	2	2	0	0	0	0	1.000
Wales	9	2	7	0	0	0	.222
Career	78	38	40	0	3	15	.487

== Coaching career ==
On 1 September 2026, Gray was appointed an assistant coach under Ian Foster at Toyota Verblitz ahead of the 2026–27 Japan Rugby League One season.

Awards and achievements
Preceded by Sean Crombie	10th Sir Willie Purves Quaich; 2009	Succeeded by Alex Blair
