= Tyrone Holmes =

Scotland international rugby union player

- Born: Tyrone Holmes; 15 April 1986 (age 40) Johannesburg, South Africa
- Height: 1.87 m (6 ft 1 1/2 in)
- Weight: 102 kg (16 st 1 lb; 225 lb)
- School: Fish Hoek High School

Rugby union career
- Position: Loose forward
Senior career
Years	Team	Apps	(Points)
- Toulon
- Northampton Saints
2010–2011	Cornish Pirates	13	(10)
2012–2013	Petrarca Rugby	10	(20)
2013–2016	Glasgow Warriors	34	(10)
2016-	Newcastle Falcons		
- Correct as of 27 June 2014
Provincial / State sides
Years	Team	Apps	(Points)
2008	Western Province	5	(0)
2008	→ Griquas	3	(0)
2012	Western Province	15	(10)
- Correct as of 28 October 2012
Super Rugby
Years	Team	Apps	(Points)
2012	Stormers	1	(0)
- Correct as of 2 July 2012
International career
Years	Team	Apps	(Points)
2014	Scotland A	1	(0)
2014	Scotland	1	(0)
- Correct as of 29 June 2014
Coaching career
- Years: Team
- 2017–19: Stade Niçois (Strength & Conditioning)
- 2019-: Scottish Rugby Academy (Performance)

Tyrone Holmes (born 15 April 1986) is a South African-born Scottish professional rugby union footballer.

== Rugby Union career ==
=== Professional career ===
As part of his South African academy development with the RPC Rugby Performance Centre, Holmes trained with Toulon for four months. He then joined Northampton Saints academy for five months but on their relegation most of the academy players were cut and he returned to South Africa.

He played for the Stormers in Super Rugby and for Western Province in the Currie Cup and Vodacom Cup, as well as the Griquas and Cornish Pirates.

Holmes helped Western Province win the Vodacom Cup for the first time in 2012, he made nine appearances and scored two tries. He also played his first Super Rugby game later in the season. As a result of a loose forward injury crisis, Holmes debuted against the Lions on 30 June 2012. He started the game in the number 6 jersey and was replaced in the 52nd minute by Tiaan Liebenberg in a 27–17 Stormers win.

After the 2012 Currie Cup Premier Division season, he joined Italian National Championship of Excellence team Petrarca Rugby for one season.

Holmes then moved to Glasgow Warriors for the start of season 2013–14. He was part of the Glasgow side's 2014–2015 Pro12 league championship winning season. Following his release from Glasgow, Holmes signed for Newcastle Falcons in the Aviva Premiership from the 2016–17 season.

=== International career ===
Holmes is eligible to play for Scotland as his father was Scottish. His grandfather played for Peebles RFC.

He was named in the Scotland A squad for their match against England Saxons on 31 January 2014, helping them to a 13–13 draw. This confirmed his Scottish nationality under World Rugby rules.

The flanker received his first cap for the full Scotland national side against South Africa on 29 June 2014.

=== Coaching career ===
On 25 July 2017 it was announced that Holmes would begin a new role as the Strength and Conditioning Coach at Stade Niçois in France.

Holmes is now the Performance Coach of the Glasgow campus of the Scottish Rugby Academy.
