= Stuart Corsar =

Scottish rugby union player

- Born: Stuart Alexander Corsar; 28 March 1984 (age 42) Inverurie, Scotland
- Height: 1.83 m (6 ft 0 in)
- Weight: 94 kg (14 st 11 lb)
- School: Inverurie Academy
- University: Aberdeen College

Rugby union career
- Position: Loosehead Prop
Amateur team(s)
Years	Team	Apps	(Points)
- Garioch
- Aberdeen GSFP
2011-13	Aberdeen GSFP		
Senior career
Years	Team	Apps	(Points)
2005-07	Glasgow Warriors	8	(5)
2007-09	Rotherham Titans		
2009-12	Doncaster Knights		
Provincial / State sides
Years	Team	Apps	(Points)
-	Caledonia U16		
-	Caledonia U18		
-	Caledonia U19		
–	Caledonia U20		
International career
Years	Team	Apps	(Points)
-	Scotland U16		
–	Scotland U18		
–	Scotland U19		
–	Scotland U21		
–	Scotland 'A'		
Coaching career
- Years: Team
- 2014-16: Aberdeen GSFP
- 2016-: Garioch RFC

6th Sir Willie Purves Quaich
- In office 2005–2005
- Preceded by: Mark McMillan
- Succeeded by: James Eddie

Stuart Corsar (born 28 March 1984 in Inverurie, Scotland) is a former rugby union player for Glasgow Warriors at the Loosehead Prop position.

Corsar was a member of Glasgow Warriors Elite Development Players (Academy squad) was promoted to a full-time professional contract in 2006.

He then moved to England to play with the Rotherham Titans.

From there he moved on to play for the Doncaster Knights.

Corsar was capped by Scotland at various age grades and finally earned a Scotland 'A' cap.

After concussion forced him to quit playing, he moved into coaching, first with Aberdeen GSFP before moving onto coach Garioch RFC, his first amateur club. Left in 2017.
