= Jack Steele (rugby union) =

Scottish rugby union player

- Born: Jack Steele; 9 September 1992 (age 34) Scotland
- Height: 6 ft 0 in (1.83 m)
- Weight: 97 kg (15 st 4 lb)

Rugby union career
- Position: Centre
Amateur team(s)
Years	Team	Apps	(Points)
- Dundee HSFP
2014-	Glasgow Hawks		
Senior career
Years	Team	Apps	(Points)
2013-15	Glasgow Warriors	1	(0)
- Correct as of 12 July 2015
International career
Years	Team	Apps	(Points)
2014	Scotland Club XV		
2014	Scotland U20		
- Correct as of 12 July 2015

Jack Steele is a Scottish rugby union player who played for Glasgow Warriors at the Centre position and now plays for Glasgow Hawks.

== Rugby Union career ==
=== Amateur career ===
Steele played for Dundee HSFP before finding himself on the Warriors radar.

He moved to the Glasgow Hawks in 2014.

=== Professional career ===
He secured an Elite Development Programme place in 2013 with Glasgow Warriors aligned to Dundee HSFP and the contract allows Steele to play for Dundee HSFP if not playing for the Glasgow Warriors.

Steele secured another EDP placement in 2014 with Glasgow Warriors this time aligned to Glasgow Hawks. Again, the EDP contract signed allows Steele to play for Glasgow Hawks if not playing for the Glasgow Warriors.

He has played 1 competitive game for Glasgow Warriors coming on a substitute in 2013–14 season against Newport Gwent Dragons.

=== International career ===
Steele has represented Scotland at Under 20 level. and at Club XV.
