= Peter Jericevich =

Scottish rugby union player

- Born: Peter Kena Jericevich; 13 February 1989 (age 37) Scotland
- Height: 5 ft 8 in (1.73 m)
- Weight: 87 kg (13 st 10 lb)

Rugby union career
- Position: Scrum-Half
International career
Years	Team	Apps	(Points)
-	Scotland Club XV	-	(-)

Peter Jericevich is a Scotland Club XV international rugby union player who has played for Doncaster Knights in the English RFU Championship. Peter is a former Scotland Age Group International and Scotland Under 19 Player of the Season (2007/08). He has also played for the Scotland 7 a side team, representing his country in six tournaments in the 2009/10 season. He is also the younger brother of Tane Jericevich, a professional rugby coach for The Austin Herd in the United States Major League Rugby Competition.
