= Matt Taylor (rugby union) =

Australian rugby union player

- Born: Matt McGregor Taylor; 16 September 1972 (age 54) Brisbane, Australia
- Height: 1.83 m (6 ft 0 in)
- Weight: 97 kg (214 lb; 15 st 4 lb)

Rugby union career
- Position: Flanker
Amateur team(s)
Years	Team	Apps	(Points)
1999–2000	Aberdeen GSFP		
Senior career
Years	Team	Apps	(Points)
2000–2002	Edinburgh Rugby		
2002–2004	Border Reivers		
2004–2005	Exeter Chiefs		
Provincial / State sides
Years	Team	Apps	(Points)
-	Queensland U16		
-	Queensland U21		
International career
Years	Team	Apps	(Points)
2001–2002	Scotland A	3	(0)
Coaching career
- Years: Team
- Queensland Reds (Defence coach)
- 2012–17: Scotland (Defence coach)
- 2012–17: Glasgow Warriors (Asst.)
- 2017-2019: Scotland (Asst. coach)
- 2019-: Australia (Defence coach)

Matt Taylor (born 16 September 1972 in Brisbane, Australia) is an Australian-born Scottish rugby union coach and is the assistant coach (defence) of the Australian National Rugby union team. He was formerly the assistant coach of the Scotland National Rugby Union team, Glasgow Warriors and the Queensland Reds.

== Rugby Union career ==
=== Playing career ===
He holds a British passport as his parents are from Dunfermline, Fife. He played in the Flanker position.

As a rugby player he played for various Scottish sides; Aberdeen GSFP, Edinburgh Rugby and Border Reivers.

He also played for Exeter Chiefs.

He was capped for Scotland 'A' thus confirming his Scottish nationality under World Rugby regulations.

=== Coaching career ===
He was previously a defence coach of Queensland Reds. As a defence coach he has led Queensland Reds to the Super Rugby title in 2011.

He joined Glasgow Warriors in August 2012. As a defence coach he has led Glasgow Warriors to the Pro12 title in 2015.

Matt Taylor's contracts as assistant coach of Scotland and assistant coach of Glasgow Warriors were due to expire at end of the 2015 World Cup.

Taylor left Glasgow Warriors to follow Gregor Townsend in taking over the Scotland national rugby union team in May 2017. He remained there until 2019.

In 2019 he was chosen by current Wallabies head coach Dave Rennie as defence coach. He is currently based in Australia.
