= Dangerous play in rugby union =

Dangerous play in rugby union is dealt with under the foul play law (Law 9) in the official International Rugby Board (IRB) rugby union law book. It defines foul play as "anything a player does within the playing enclosure that is against the letter and spirit of the Laws of the Game". Under these laws dangerous play includes; punching or striking, stamping or trampling, and kicking.

== Process ==
If a referee observes dangerous play they are obliged to penalise and admonish the perpetrator. This can result in a "temporary suspension" (yellow card) of 10 minutes or even a "sending off" (red card). If the offence is serious enough further action can be taken after the game, including bans from playing rugby and criminal charges. In some high-profile matches a citing commissioner is appointed, who can cite any player for dangerous play, whether they have been detected by the referee or not. In matches where there is no appointed citing commissioner the Unions involved can cite players for dangerous play. During the judicial process the severity of the incident is considered. This is assessed by judging if the offending was intentional, reckless, provoked or premeditated as well as what body part was used (fist, knee, boot etc.), how vulnerable the victim was, the effect of the actions had on the victim and disciplinary record of the offender. When handing out match suspensions for dangerous play the IRB recommends suspension periods based on the type and severity of the offence. For most incidences of dangerous play (punching, stamping, dangerous tackles etc.) they recommend suspensions starting from two weeks, up to a maximum of one year. The more serious offences include striking with the head (up to two years), making contact with the eyes (up to three years), testicle grabbing (up to four years) and biting (up to four years).

== Misconduct ==
The law that deals with dangerous play also applies to misconduct. Misconduct is any conduct (excluding foul play during a match) that is unsporting, unruly, ill-disciplined or that brings the sport of rugby union into disrepute. Misconduct deals with violence or intimidation that occurs within the venue (i.e. changing rooms, tunnel, warmup area), abuse of match officials or spectators, discriminatory statements, bribery, betting on involved games or lying about past disciplinary records. The penalty handed down for misconduct cases could be a caution, fine, suspension (for a number of matches or time period), exclusion from Rugby Unions or grounds, suspension from Rugby officiating or a combination of the above. Verbal abuse of match officials can be punished by up to a year suspension, while threatening could result in five years and physical abuse of an official could see the offender banned for life.

== History ==
Early Rugby games were played under a code of conduct that varied between each school or club. As the popularity and number of clubs increased a set of standardised rules were developed. On 24 November 1863 a set of rules was developed by the Football Association (FA) that included the first law involving dangerous play. Law 10 stated that: "If any player with the ball should run towards his advisories' goal, any player in the opposition side should be at liberty to charge, hold, trip, or hack him, or wrest the ball from him; but no player shall be held or hacked at the same time". Hacking (tripping an opponent and kicking his shins) and carrying the ball were the most contested rules and they were soon scrapped by the FA. This caused some clubs to leave the Association and soon more games were played that involved hacking and carrying the ball than those that followed the FA's "official" laws. Concerns over hacking came to a head in 1870 when a surgeon published a letter in the times complaining about the number of rugby injuries he had dealt with that involved hacking, and chastised the schools for letting it continue.

== Punching and fighting ==
During the 1974 Lions tour to South Africa, Lions captain Willie McBride devised a plan where on a set call every player would attack a South African player, reasoning that this would prevent the referee form penalising any one individual, as he could not send the whole team off. After French fullback Serge Blanco was bumped after taking a mark by Englishman Nigel Heslop during the 1991 Rugby World Cup quarter-final, flanker Éric Champ knocked Heslop out with a punch. In 1990 English lock Paul Ackford was unexpectedly hit by a haymaker from Argentine prop Federico Mendez after being mistaken for another player who made contact with Mendez's head. During the British and Irish Lions 2001 tour match against Australian state side the New South Wales Waratahs, fullback Duncan McRae punched Lions Fly half Ronan O'Gara multiple times as he lay prone on the ground. He received a red card and subsequent seven week ban for the offence, although as it occurred during the Australian off-season he didn't miss any games. In 2009 at a rugby derby involving two of Romania's top teams a mass brawl broke out involving most of the players and reportedly a few spectators. Two players received a red card at the time and nine players were later suspended by the Romanian Rugby Federation.

== Stamping and kicking ==
In a 1927 match involving Quillan, the strongest team in France at the time, and Perpignan, the Quillan hooker Gaston Riviere received such a kicking that he died from his injuries. Welsh fullback J. P. R. Williams was the victim of stamping by touring New Zealand prop John Ashworth in 1978. After receiving 30 stitches from his father he returned to the game. A player for Welsh club Pontycymmer was jailed for 15 months after stomping on an opposition player's head during a rugby game in 2005. In 2006 a South African rugby player from the Western Cape died after allegedly being kicked in the head during a rugby match.

== Biting ==
South African prop Johan le Roux bit New Zealand hooker Sean Fitzpatrick's ear during a scrum during a test in 1994, receiving an 18-month ban. After the disciplinary hearing he stated that "For an 18-month suspension, I feel I probably should have torn it off". Kevin Yates, an English international, was cited for foul play in 1998 by London Scottish after a player suffered a serious injury to his left ear and subsequently received a six-month ban. In 2008 an English club player was banned for eighty weeks following a biting incident that left a player with "a partial amputation of the right index finger". A Welsh club rugby player was jailed for a year in 2008 for biting an opponent's earlobe off. After a scuffle during a 2009 rugby match in the Cape Town suburb of Brackenfell, a player had to have his fingertip reattached after an alleged biting incident.

== Dangerous tackles ==
New Zealand players Tana Umaga and Keven Mealamu were involved in an illegal spear tackle on Lions captain Brian O'Driscoll at the start of the first test during the 2005 tour. The tackle dislocated O'Driscoll's shoulder, putting him out of the rest of the tour. Although cited, no suspensions were handed to either Umaga or Mealamu.

== Eye-gouging ==
Eye-gouging is a serious offence where a player uses hands or fingers to inflict pain in an opponent's eyes. The game's laws refer to it as "contact with eyes or the eye area of an opponent" but such incidents are usually referred to as "eye-gouging" among players and in the media. The IRB has made special mention of eye gouging, describing it as "particularly heinous". Following two high-profile test match incidents, involving Schalk Burger and Sergio Parisse, during the same week in June 2009, the IRB stated that it would review the sanction structure for this type of offence "in order to send out the strongest possible message that such acts will not be tolerated".

On 2 October 2010, Gavin Quinnell of the Welsh regional team Scarlets suffered an eye injury 30 minutes into a game between Scarlets feeder club Llanelli and Cross Keys. The following Thursday it was confirmed that, despite the best efforts of surgeons, he had lost the sight in his left eye. The incident is currently being investigated by the Welsh Rugby Union and Gwent Police. Clarence Harding, an amateur player, lost sight in his right eye after an incident. On 24 November 2010 the player alleged to have been responsible was cleared of all charges due to lack of evidence.
