= Chris O'Young =

- Born: 3 March 1981 (age 45)
- Height: 1.79 m (5 ft 10 in)
- Weight: 82 kg (181 lb)

Rugby union career
- Position: Scrumhalf
Amateur team(s)
Years	Team	Apps	(Points)
-	Associates		
Senior career
Years	Team	Apps	(Points)
2007-8	Glasgow Warriors	12	(0)
Super Rugby
Years	Team	Apps	(Points)
-	Waratahs	8	
–	Western Force	43	

Chris O'Young (born 3 March 1981) is an Australian rugby union player. His position of choice is scrum-half and he played for the Western Force in the Super 14 competition in 2006. He joined Scottish club the Glasgow Warriors for the 2007–08 Celtic League season.

== Early career ==
O'Young was educated at St Patrick's College, Strathfield, the same school as former Wallabies Michael Foley and John Ballesty. He represented the college's First XV and on graduating joined the Eastwood club in Sydney's grade competition.

== Club and Nationals ==
In 2002 and 2003, he represented Australia in sevens. He has represented NSW at U/19 and U/21 levels. In 2004, he joined the West Harbour club, renewing his association with coach Joe Barakat who was his coach at St Patrick's.

He is considered to be the deputy to first choice half Matt Henjak but did start one game in 2006. He used to be understudy to Chris Whitaker for the NSW Waratahs. O'Young joined the Western Force for their inaugural Super 14 season in 2006 and WAS linked with Associates rugby club in Perth. He has a degree in economics and is studying for an MBA. In 2007 O'Young joined Scottish side Glasgow Warriors and was their first choice scrum half. In 2008 O'Young moved back to Western Force during the off-season. Announced his retirement from rugby at the end of the 2010 Super 14 season 21 April 2010.
