= Callum Reid (rugby union, born 1992) =

Scottish rugby union player

- Born: Callum Reid; 9 September 1992 (age 34) Scotland
- Height: 6 ft 1 in (1.85 m)
- Weight: 97 kg (15 st 4 lb)

Rugby union career
- Position: Flanker / Number Eight
Amateur team(s)
Years	Team	Apps	(Points)
- Edinburgh Academicals
2015-present	Boroughmuir RFC		
International career
Years	Team	Apps	(Points)
2011/12	Scotland U20	8	(0)
- Correct as of 20 August 2015

Callum Reid (born 9 September 1992 in Scotland) is a Scottish rugby union player who plays for Boroughmuir RFC. He can play at Flanker or Number Eight.

Reid played for Edinburgh Academicals for many years. He left Accies in 2015 to play in New Zealand. He joined Boroughmuir RFC for the 2015-16 season.

He has represented Scotland at Under 20 level. He has also represented Scotland at Sevens.

He played for Glasgow Warriors as part of their 7s squad that won the Glasgow City Sevens in May 2013. They beat Glasgow Hawks 26-17 in the final. Reid scored a hat trick in the final.

He trained with Glasgow Warriors in the 2013-14 season.
