= Ian Riddoch =

Ian Riddoch is a former CEO of the Glasgow Warriors, a professional Scottish rugby union club playing in the Pro14.

On leaving Leeds Beckett University in 1994 Riddoch got a job with Leeds City Council in Promotions and Tourism. This evolved into being a co-ordinator for Leeds becoming a host city for the football tournament Euro 96.

This gave a natural progression into the sporting world; first as an account manager working on football sponsorship accounts between 1995 and 1998; then as head of sales and marketing for Super League (Europe) marketing rugby league. Staying with rugby league he became the commercial director of Wigan Warriors in 2000.

Moving to football, he was the head of sales and marketing at Aberdeen FC for five years from 2001. He stepped down from this role to become a consultant in May 2006. He briefly worked with Milton Keynes Dons to develop a programme for their new stadium plan.

A move to rugby union saw him become the Commercial Director for Edinburgh Rugby. He moved to the Edinburgh club in August 2006.

He was made interim General Manager of the Glasgow Warriors in June 2007. This move to Glasgow was made permanent by Riddoch accepting the post of Chief Executive Officer in July 2007. The new CEO was keen on new sponsorship deals and together with Edinburgh Rugby they announced a sponsorship deal for the 2008-09 season's 1872 Cup with the backing of the fitness operator David Lloyd Leisure.

Riddoch stepped down as CEO in July 2009. This seemed to be following a review by the SRU of its commercial operation. It was hinted that this review took back the commercial activities from the professional clubs to the SRU and was accompanied by a drop in salary for both Edinburgh Rugby and Glasgow Warriors CEOs. Riddoch refused the new deal. After a short caretaker stint by Colin Thomson, the Warriors replaced Riddoch as CEO by Kenny Baillie in October 2009.

In 2010 it was announced that he was the new Commercial Director of football club Southend Utd. The post lasted last than a year and he became a consultant again in 2011.

From 2011 he has been consulting in Doha, Qatar developing football's commerciality there ahead of the 2022 World Cup. He is presently the Acting Director of Sales for the Qatar Stars League.
