= James Eddie =

Scottish rugby union player

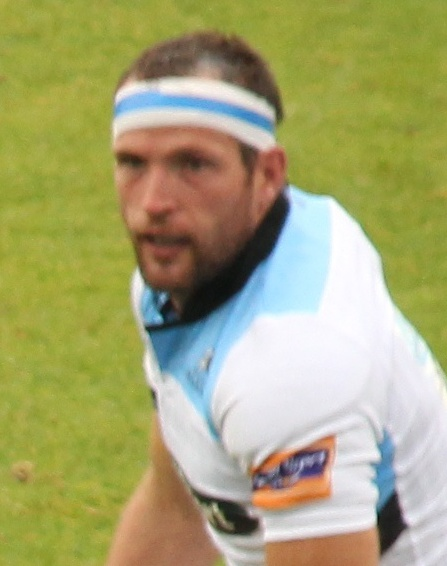
- Eddie in 2013
- Born: James William Eddie; 3 June 1985 (age 41) Glasgow, Scotland
- Height: 1.93 m (6 ft 4 in)
- Weight: 112 kg (17 st 9 lb)

Rugby union career
- Position(s): Flanker, Lock
Amateur team(s)
| Years | Team | Apps | (Points) |
- Clarkston
| – | Glasgow Southern RFC | | |
| – | GHA | | |
Senior career
| Years | Team | Apps | (Points) |
| 2004–2016 | Glasgow Warriors | 126 | (35) |
International career
| Years | Team | Apps | (Points) |
| 2005-06 | Scotland U21 | 3 | (0) |
| 2008-10 | Scotland A | 6 | (0) |
National sevens team
| Years | Team | | Comps |
| 2011–2015 | Scotland 7s | | 13 |
Coaching career
- Years: Team
- 2016-: GHA (Specialist Skills Coach)

7th Sir Willie Purves Quaich
- In office 2006–2006
- Preceded by: Stuart Corsar
- Succeeded by: Moray Low

James Eddie (born 3 June 1985) is a Scottish former professional Rugby union player. He played as a flanker or lock for Glasgow Warriors in the Guinness PRO12.

Eddie has represented both Scotland A and Scotland Sevens and has made 126 appearances for his club since joining as an apprentice in 2004 and earning his professional contract in 2006.

On 26 April 2016, James Eddie announced his retirement from playing professional rugby with immediate effect. A huge fans favourite, Eddie paid tribute to the fans on his retiral: "The Glasgow Warriors supporters have always had my back, they've been amazing and I want to thank them for all the support they've given me." This was echoed by Gregor Townsend: "James has been a great role model for what the Warriors are all about – working hard every day to improve himself and also doing all he can to get the best out of his teammates. He has also been a great ambassador for the club and is rightly held in high regard from our supporters."

In May 2016, he was named as Specialist Skills Coach for GHA.
