= Moray Low =

Scotland international rugby union player

- Born: Moray John Low; 28 November 1984 (age 41) Torphins, Aberdeenshire, Scotland
- Height: 1.88 m (6 ft 2 in)
- Weight: 130 kg (20 st 7 lb; 287 lb)
- School: Lossiemouth High School

Rugby union career
- Position: Tighthead Prop/Loosehead Prop
Senior career
Years	Team	Apps	(Points)
2006–2014	Glasgow Warriors	150	(40)
2014–2019	Exeter Chiefs	31	(10)
- Correct as of 21 May 2019
International career
Years	Team	Apps	(Points)
2006	Scotland Club XV		
2009–19	Scotland	37	(0)
- Correct as of 21 May 2019

8th Sir Willie Purves Quaich
- In office 2007–2007
- Preceded by: James Eddie
- Succeeded by: Sean Crombie

Moray Low (born 28 November 1984 in Torphins, Aberdeenshire, Scotland) is a retired rugby union player. Low's position of choice is as a Prop. He is capable of playing on both sides of the scrum.

He was called up to the Scotland squad for the 2008 Six Nations Championship, where he made his debut coming on as a second substitute for Alasdair Dickinson against France in the Stade de France.

Low was named in the Scotland squad for the 2011 Rugby World Cup but played no part in any of Scotland's four games.

It was announced on 16 February 2014 that Low will be joining English Aviva Premiership side Exeter Chiefs on a two-year deal. He would go on to spend five years with the Chiefs reaching three Premiership Finals in that time.

In May 2019, Low announced his retirement from Rugby. It was revealed he planned to focus on a property development business he had set up with former team-mate and Exeter Chiefs defense coach Julian Salvi.
