= 2026–27 Glasgow Warriors season =

Glasgow Warriors
- 2026–27 season
- Head coach: Franco Smith
- United Rugby Championship: 2nd (after Round 3)
- Top try scorer: League: Jamie Dobie – 5
- Top points scorer: League: George Horne – 27

The 2026–27 season is Glasgow Warriors' sixth season in the United Rugby Championship, and 28th in all formats of the competition including the Welsh–Scottish League. Along with competing in the URC and its Scottish–Italian Shield competition, the club will also participate in the 2026–27 European Rugby Champions Cup and the 1872 Cup.

Glasgow Warriors enter the URC Scottish–Italian Shield as reigning champions, following a fourth triumph in the competition, and as holders of the 1872 Cup.

== Team ==
=== Coaches ===
- Head coach: (South Africa) Franco Smith
- Assistant coach (attack): (Ireland) Nigel Carolan
- Assistant coach (defence): (Scotland) Scott Forrest
- Scrum Coach: (Scotland) Alasdair Dickinson
- Senior Academy Coach: (Scotland) Shade Munro

=== Athletic Performance ===
- Head Strength and Conditioning Coach: (Ireland) Liam Walshe
- Senior Athletic Performance Coach: (Scotland) Al Strokosch
- Sport Scientist: Andy Ryan
- Senior Academy Athletic Performance Coach: Luke O'Dea

=== Medical ===
- Team Doctor: Neil Howie
- Clinical Manager and Lead Physiotherapist: Andrew Boag
- Senior Team Physiotherapist: Michael Clark
- Junior Physiotherapist: Josh Kennedy
- Junior Physiotherapist: Sean Hannon

=== Analysis ===
- Lead Performance Analyst: Greg Woolard
- Asst. Performance Analyst: Alex Geddes
- Senior Academy Performance Analyst: Eilidh Wright

=== Rugby Operations ===
- Rugby Operations Manager: John Manson
- Player Development Manager: Stuart Dow
- Assistant Operations Manager: Stuart Lewis
- Kit & Equipment Manager: Dougie Mills

=== Commercial ===
- Head of Commercial: Glen Tippett
- Lead Account Manager: Rachael McConnell
- Account Manager: Courtney McBain
- Partnership Account Manager: Rachel Bradley
- Partnership and Sales Manager and Rugby Ambassador: Ryan Wilson
- Account Executive: Katie Miller

=== Marketing ===
- Marketing and brand manager: Claire Scott

=== Communications ===
- Lead Communications and External Affairs Manager: Jack McIlroy Reid
- Media Manager: Craig Wright
- Social Media Manager : Darcie Morris
- Content Producer: Cameron Avery

=== Operations ===
- Head of Operations: Fraser Michie
- Stadium Operations Manager: Jana Tobin
- Events and Operations Executive: Caitlin Chase
- Operations Executive: Ross Lowther
- Community Engagement Manager: Ciera Campbell

=== Executive ===
- Managing Director: Kenny Brown
- Chairman: Charles Shaw
- Advisory Group: Walter Malcolm, Douglas McCrea, Alan Lees, Paul Taylor, Frank Mitchell, Scott Mathieson

=== Squad ===
Hookers (Scotland) Angus Fraser (Scotland) Gregor Hiddleston (Scotland) Seb Stephen (England) Jack Singleton (Australia) Tavi Tuipulotu Props (Scotland) Zander Fagerson (South Africa) Leon Lyons (Scotland) Nathan McBeth (Scotland) Fin Richardson (Namibia) Patrick Schickerling (Scotland) Rory Sutherland (Australia) Sam Talakai (Scotland) Murphy Walker Locks (Scotland) Ryan Burke (Scotland) Alex Craig (Scotland) Scott Cummings (Scotland) Jare Oguntibeju (Scotland) Alex Samuel (Scotland) Max Williamson	Loose Forwards (Scotland) Gregor Brown (Scotland) Rory Darge (Scotland) Macenzzie Duncan (Scotland) Matt Fagerson (Scotland) Euan Ferrie (Scotland) Ruaraidh Hart (Scotland) Ally Miller (Scotland) Jamie Ritchie (South Africa) Ruwald van der Merwe Scrum halves (Scotland) Ben Afshar (Scotland) Jamie Dobie (Scotland) George Horne (Scotland) Jack Oliver Fly halves (Scotland) Dan Lancaster (Australia) Charlie Savala (Scotland) Matthew Urwin	Centres (Australia) Bayley Kuenzle (Scotland) Stafford McDowall (Scotland) Duncan Munn (Scotland) Kyle Steyn (Scotland) Sione Tuipulotu (Scotland) Johnny Ventisei (Scotland) Kerr Yule Back Three (Scotland) Kerr Johnston (New Zealand) Josh McKay (Scotland) Kyle Rowe (Scotland) Ollie Smith (Scotland) Fergus Watson

=== Academy ===
==== Scottish Rugby Academy Stage 3 players ====
These players are given a professional contract by the Scottish Rugby Academy. To be involved in the Scottish Rugby Academy all players must commit to play for Scotland and cannot play for any other nation while in the academy. Although given placements they are not contracted by Glasgow Warriors. Players graduate from the academy when a professional club contract is offered.

These players are assigned to Glasgow Warriors for the season 2026–27.

Academy players promoted in the course of the season are listed with the main squad.

- (Scotland) Max Morrison - Prop
- (Scotland) Jackson Rennie - Prop
- (Scotland) Jake Shearer – Prop
- (Scotland) Oliver McKenna – Prop
- (Scotland) Joe Roberts – Hooker
- (Scotland) Dan Halkon – Lock
- (Scotland) Rory Baxter - Flanker
- (Scotland) Dylan Cockburn - Flanker
- (Scotland) Josh Mackenzie – Flanker
- (Scotland) Lloyd Moncrieff - Flanker
- (Scotland) Harvey Preston – Flanker
- (Scotland) Rory Purvis – Flanker
- (Scotland) Callum Reidy - Scrum half
- (Scotland) Henry Armstrong - Fly half
- (Scotland) Alex Brydon - Centre
- (Scotland) Campbell Waugh – Centre
- (Scotland) James Mackenzie – Wing
- (Scotland) Harry Provan – Wing
- (Scotland) Guy Rogers – Wing
- (Scotland) Cameron Van Wyk – Wing

==== Back up players ====
Other players used by Glasgow Warriors over the course of the season.

- (Scotland) Jamie McAughtrie (Ayr RFC) - Hooker
- (Scotland) Gregor Johnston (Glasgow Hawks) - Scrum Half

== Staff movements ==
=== Coaches ===
==== Personnel in ====
- (Scotland) Duncan Weir (Academy coach)

==== Personnel out ====
- (Scotland) Roddy Grant (Assistant coach) [left October 2026]

=== Staff ===
==== Personnel out ====
- (Scotland) Kenny Brown (Managing Director) [leaves end December 2026]

== Player movements ==
=== Academy promotions ===
None as yet.

=== Player transfers ===
==== In ====
- (South Africa) Ruwald van der Merwe from (South Africa) Pumas
- (Australia) Bayley Kuenzle from (Australia) Western Force
- (Scotland) Jamie Ritchie from (France) Perpignan
- (Scotland) Ruaraidh Hart from (Scotland) Stirling County
- (England) Jack Singleton from (England) Gloucester Rugby
- (South Africa) Leon Lyons from (South Africa) Griquas

==== Out ====
- (Scotland) Jamie Bhatti to (England) Bath
- (Scotland) Johnny Matthews to (France) Montauban
- (Scotland) Jack Dempsey to (Japan) Toshiba Brave Lupus Tokyo
- (Scotland) Huw Jones to (France) Toulon
- (Scotland) Duncan Weir retired
- (Scotland) Adam Hastings to (France) Montpellier
- (Tonga) Sione Vailanu to (France) Biarritz
- (Scotland) Brent Jackson to (England) Rotherham Titans
- (Scotland) Grant Stewart released

== Competitions ==
=== Pre-season and friendlies ===
Warriors confirmed an early September pre-season friendly with Newcastle Red Bulls on 5 September 2026. The match starts at 5pm. It will be the first time that Glasgow Warriors played the Newcastle side since April 2022 when the Glasgow Warriors won a European Challenge Cup match with the then Newcastle Falcons by 29 points to 19 points.

A pre-season friendly was announced, with last year's hosts Bath, this time heading north. The match however with not be played at Scotstoun; instead Glasgow Warriors will play the match at the High School of Glasgow's rugby ground at the Old Anniesland complex. Glasgow Warriors are no strangers to Old Anniesland, they played some Celtic League matches there back in the day, but it has been over twenty years since they last played there. Coincidentally that match was also played on 18 September; back in 2004-05 season and then Glasgow Warriors beat their oldest rival Edinburgh Rugby in a 12-10 derby win, in a towsy match where at one point they were down to 13 players.

The match pitting a Glasgow Warriors - with few exceptions, where almost every player was either an academy player or an academy graduate of the previous season - against a full powered Bath side with Finn Russell, Will Stuart, Josh Bayliss and Sam Underhill among them, was a huge task for Glasgow's youngsters. Nevertheless, it was a match where they had more possession and more entries into the opposition 22 and stood up well to Bath's physicality. They couldn't match Bath's experience though and the Somerset side simply picked off the Glasgow side when they lost the ball with Finn Russell pulling the strings and starting Bath's attacks. The match ended 9 tries to 1 for the Bath side.

From The Scotsman:

Ultimately, there were positives to take from the final results. Physically it wasn’t nearly as one sided as the final score line would suggest, but it was the quality of Bath’s defence and precision when in attack that was the difference. Warriors stood up well to their far more experienced opponents and made them work hard for their points. They were realistically unlucky not to add more scores of their own but time and again they were cut off by a huge defensive effort.

Franco Smith was full of positives for his young side at the end of the match: "We did expect them to be as physical as they were, and I think that was the main lesson. I think the three objectives we had was to be brave, to be physical and to show the effort, and I thought we've seen that. I'm excited because we want to measure ourselves against the best. It's easy to explain to the boys in a Monday morning meeting. This is going to be tough and it's going to be hard, and remember, these guys are top in the Premiership. They've been consistent in Europe and played in the semi-finals, quarter-finals last year. They're a good side, it's going to be physical. So if they get that experience, then that's fantastic."

A mid-season friendly was announced by Leicester Tigers, stating that they would play Glasgow Warriors on 27 November 2027 at Welford Road.

==== Pre-season ====
5 September 2026	Newcastle Red Bulls (England)	47 - 31	(Scotland) Glasgow Warriors	Kingston Park
5pm	Try: Sam Graham; Chris Harris; Josh Hodge; Tom Christie; Christian Wade; George McGuigan; Oli Spencer; Con: Josh Hodge x 5 Jake Dalziel	Preview; Report; Report; Report	Try: Kerr Johnston; Guy Rogers x 2 Jamie McAughtrie; Callum Reidy; Con: Matthew Urwin x 3	Attendance: 2,816; Referee: Hamish Smales (RFU)
Newcastle Red Bulls: 15 Josh Hodge, 14 Christian Wade, 13 Chris Harris, 12 Will Rigg, 11 Werner Kok, 10 Brett Connon, 9 Raffi Quirke; 1 Micky Rewcastle, 2 George McGuigan, 3 James Harper, 4 Rusi Tuima, 5 Cam Jordan, 6 Sam Graham, 7 Tom Christie (captain), 8 Ollie Leatherbarrow. Replacements: Elvis Kitenge-Fuki, George Bolam, James Elliott, Jake Dalziel, Sammy Arnold, Zuriel Togiatama, Tom West, Murray McCallum, Oscar Usher, Allan Ferrie, Alfie Warwick, Oli Spencer, Harrison Obatoyinbo				Attendance: 2,816; Referee: Hamish Smales (RFU)
Glasgow Warriors: 15 Fergus Watson, 14 Cameron van Wyk, 13 Kerr Johnston, 12 Kerr Yule, 11 Guy Rogers, 10 Matthew Urwin, 9 Jack Oliver; 1 Jake Shearer, 2 Tavi Tuipulotu, 3 Murphy Walker, 4 Dan Halkon, 5 Jare Ogntibeju, 6 Dylan Cockburn, 7 Angus Fraser, 8 Macenzzie Duncan. Replacements: 6 Jamie McAughtrie, 17 Patrick Schickerling, 18 Sam Talakai, 19 Ruaraidh Hart, 20 Euan Ferrie, 21 Callum Reidy, 22 Johnny Ventisei, 23 Bayley Kuenzle, 16 Joe Roberts, 17 Ollie McKenna, 20 Harvey Preston, 9 Gregor Johnston, 10 Dan Lancaster, 11 Harry Provan, 14 Alex Bryden, 15 Josh McKay

18 September 2026	Glasgow Warriors (Scotland)	5 - 53	(England) Bath	Old Anniesland
7.30pm	Try: Alex Bryden	Preview; Report; Report; Report	Try: Santiago Carreras x 2 Joe Cokanasiga; Bernard van der Linde x 2 Cameron Redpath x 2 Ollie Lawrence; Tom Carr-Smith; Con: Finn Russell; Ciaran Donoghue x 2 Tom de Glanville	Attendance: 2000; Referee: Rob McDowell (SRU)
Glasgow Warriors: 15 Fergus Watson, 14 Cameron van Wyk, 13 Johnny Ventisei, 12 Bayley Kuenzle, 11 Guy Rogers, 10 Matthew Urwin, 9 Callum Reidy, 1 Jake Shearer, 2 Tavi Tuipulotu, 3 Fin Richardson, 4 Ruaraidh Hart, 5 Dan Halkon, 6 Ally Miller [capt], 7 Angus Fraser, 8 Macenzzie Duncan Replacements: Joe Roberts, Seb Stephen, Nathan McBeth, Ollie McKenna, Murphy Walker, Max Williamson, Dylan Cockburn, Harvey Preston, Jack Oliver, Gregor Johnston, Ollie Smith, Dan Lancaster, Harry Provan, Kerr Yule, Kerr Johnston, Alex Bryden, Sam Talakai, Josh McKay				Attendance: 2000; Referee: Rob McDowell (SRU)
Bath: 01. Beno Obano, 02. Dan Frost, 03. Will Stuart, 04. Ted Hill, 05. Charlie Ewels [capt], 06. Guy Pepper, 07. Sam Underhill, 08. Josh Bayliss, 09. Bernard Van der Linde, 10. Finn Russell, 11. Tom De Glanville, 12. Max Ojomoh, 13. Ollis Lawrence, 14. Joe Cokonasiga, 15. Santiago Carreras Replacements: Jamie Bhatti, Tom Carr-Smith, Ieuan Davies, Ciaran Donoghue, Dan du Preez, Tom Dunn, Austin Emens, Arthur Green, Archie Griffin, Charlie Griffin, Jack Harrison, Will Jeanes, Scott Kirk, Ross Molony, Cameron Redpath, Miles Reid, Ewan Richards, Quinn Roux, George Timmins, Kepueli Tuipulotu, Claudius Wheeler, Jack Woods

==== Mid-season ====
27 November 2026	Leicester Tigers (England)	v	(Scotland) Glasgow Warriors	Welford Road Stadium
7.30pm
Leicester Tigers: Replacements:
Glasgow Warriors: Replacements:

21 January 2027	Glasgow Warriors 'A' (Scotland)	v	Scotland U20	Scotstoun Stadium
Glasgow Warriors 'A': Replacements:
Scotland U20: Replacements:

4 February 2027	Leinster (Ireland)	v	(Scotland) Glasgow Warriors 'A'	RDS Arena
Leinster: Replacements:
Glasgow Warriors 'A': Replacements:

2 April 2027	Glasgow Warriors 'A' (Scotland)	v	(Scotland) Edinburgh 'A'	Scotstoun Stadium
Glasgow Warriors 'A': Replacements:
Edinburgh 'A': Replacements:

16 April 2027	Glasgow Warriors 'A' (Scotland)	v	(United Kingdom) Army	Scotstoun Stadium
Glasgow Warriors 'A': Replacements:
Army: Replacements:

8 May 2027	Newcastle Red Bulls Academy (England)	v	(Scotland) Glasgow Warriors 'A'	Kingston Park
Newcastle Red Bull Academy: Replacements:
Glasgow Warriors 'A': Replacements:

14 May 2027	Leinster Academy (Ireland)	v	(Scotland) Glasgow Warriors 'A'	RDS Arena
Leinster Academy: Replacements:
Glasgow Warriors 'A': Replacements:

== United Rugby Championship ==
=== Matches ===
26 September	(1 BP) Munster (Ireland)	20–26	(Scotland) Glasgow Warriors (1 BP)	Thomond Park, Limerick
	Try: O'Connor 14' c Milne 36' c Con: Hanrahan (2/2) 15', 37'; Pen: Hanrahan (2) 4', 58'	Report; Scorecard; Highlights	Try: Dobie (2) 31' c, 76' m McBeth 51' c Horne 67' x Con: Horne (3/4) 32', 52', 68'; Cards: Smith (yellow card) 8'	Attendance: 11,031; Referee: Ferreira (South Africa)

3 October	(1 BP) Glasgow Warriors (Scotland)	33–33	(Ireland) Ulster (1 BP)	Scotstoun Stadium
	Try: McKay 10' c Rowe (2) 26' c, 64' m Dobie 53' c Talakai 60' c Con: Horne (4/5) 11', 27', 54', 60'; Cards: Lancaster (yellow card) 19'; Darge (yellow card) 71'; Talakai (yellow card) 72'	Report; Scorecard; Highlights	Try: B Ward 4' c McIlroy 21' m Murphy 43' c Mullins 47' c Augustus 73' c Con: Murphy (3/4) 5', 44', 48'; Doak (1/1) 74'; Cards: Carson (yellow card) 50'; McIlroy (yellow card) 51'	Attendance: 7,321; Referee: Marius Jonker (South Africa)

9 October	(1 BP) Glasgow Warriors (Scotland)	36–19	(Ireland) Connacht	Scotstoun Stadium
	Try: Hiddleston (2) 20' m, 43' c Darge 33' c McKay 43' c Stephen 65' c Con: Horne (4/5) 34', 44', 44', 66'; Pen: Lancaster 83'; Cards: Cummings (yellow card) 74'	Report; Scorecard; Highlights	Try: Jansen 15' c Ioane (2) 47' c, 59' m Con: Frawley (2/3) 16', 48'; Cards: Illo (yellow card) 42'; Murphy (yellow card) 62'	Attendance: 6,970; Referee: Ben Breakspear (Wales)

24 October	(1 BP) Benetton (Italy)	20–24	(Scotland) Glasgow Warriors (1 BP)	Stadio Monigo, Treviso
	Try: Zanandrea 30' c Lynagh 42' c Con: Umaga (2/2) 31', 43'; Pen: Umaga (2) 41', 69'; Cards: Midena (yellow card) 46'	Report; Scorecard; Highlights	Try: Ferrie 50' c Steyn 53'm Darge 56' m Oguntibeju 78' c Con: Urwin (1/3) 51'; Kuenzle (1/1) 79'	Attendance: 5,000; Referee: Griffen Colby (South Africa)

30 October	(1 BP) Glasgow Warriors (Scotland)	29–20	(South Africa) Lions	Scotstoun Stadium
	Try: Watson 10' c Lancaster 29' c Singleton 35' m Smith 76' c Con: Horne (3/4) 11', 30', 77'; Pen: Horne 82'	Report; Scorecard; Highlights	Try: van den Berg 50' c Mahashe 65' m Brandon 70' m Con: Chamberlain (1/3) 51'; Pen: C Smith 14'; Cards: Oosthuizen (yellow card) 28'	Attendance: 7,321; Referee: Andrea Piardi (Italy)

5 December 2026	Glasgow Warriors (Scotland)	v	(Italy) Benetton	Scotstoun Stadium

19 December 2026	Leinster (Ireland)	v	(Scotland) Glasgow Warriors	RDS Arena, Dublin

27 December 2026	Edinburgh (Scotland)	v	(Scotland) Glasgow Warriors	Murrayfield Stadium, Edinburgh

2 January 2027	Zebre Parma (Italy)	v	(Scotland) Glasgow Warriors	Stadio Sergio Lanfranchi

22 January 2027	Glasgow Warriors (Scotland)	v	(Wales) Scarlets	Scotstoun Stadium

29 January 2027	Glasgow Warriors (Scotland)	v	(Wales) Ospreys	Scotstoun Stadium

27 February 2027	Cardiff (Wales)	v	(Scotland) Glasgow Warriors	Cardiff Arms Park

19 March 2027	Glasgow Warriors (Scotland)	v	(South Africa) Stormers	Scotstoun Stadium

26 March 2027	Glasgow Warriors (Scotland)	v	(Italy) Zebre Parma	Scotstoun Stadium

16 April 2027	Dragons (Wales)	v	(Scotland) Glasgow Warriors	Rodney Parade, Newport

24 April 2027	Glasgow Warriors (Scotland)	v	(Scotland) Edinburgh	Hampden Park

8 May 2027	Bulls (South Africa)	v	(Scotland) Glasgow Warriors	Loftus Versfeld, Pretoria

15 May 2027	Sharks (South Africa)	v	(Scotland) Glasgow Warriors	Kings Park Stadium, Durban

=== Standings ===
Pos	Team	Pld	W	D	L	PF	PA	PD	TF	TA	TB	LB	Pts	Qualification
1	Glasgow Warriors	5	4	1	0	148	112	+36	22	15	5	0	23	Qualification for the Champions Cup and knockout stage
2	Bulls	5	4	0	1	214	106	+108	31	15	4	1	21	Qualification for the Champions Cup and knockout stage
3	Stormers	5	4	0	1	166	101	+65	24	14	4	1	21	Qualification for the Champions Cup and knockout stage
4	Sharks	5	4	0	1	140	107	+33	20	16	3	0	19	Qualification for the Champions Cup and knockout stage
5	Edinburgh	5	4	0	1	123	95	+28	17	12	3	0	19	Qualification for the Champions Cup and knockout stage
6	Leinster	5	3	0	2	149	81	+68	23	11	4	2	18	Qualification for the Champions Cup and knockout stage
7	Cardiff	5	3	0	2	113	107	+6	17	17	2	0	14	Qualification for the Champions Cup and knockout stage
8	Dragons	5	2	1	2	137	128	+9	20	20	3	1	14	Qualification for the Champions Cup and knockout stage
9	Ospreys	5	2	0	3	112	147	−35	18	21	3	0	11	Qualification for the Challenge Cup
10	Benetton	5	1	1	3	115	104	+11	16	17	2	3	11	Qualification for the Challenge Cup
11	Connacht	5	2	0	3	109	161	−52	18	24	2	0	10	Qualification for the Challenge Cup
12	Munster	5	1	1	3	93	113	−20	12	17	2	2	10	Qualification for the Challenge Cup
13	Lions	5	2	0	3	107	162	−55	15	25	1	0	9	Qualification for the Challenge Cup
14	Scarlets	5	1	0	4	134	191	−57	20	29	4	1	9	Qualification for the Challenge Cup
15	Ulster	5	0	2	3	121	160	−39	18	22	4	1	9	Qualification for the Challenge Cup
16	Zebre	5	0	0	5	93	199	−106	14	30	2	0	2	Qualification for the Challenge Cup

Updated to match(es) played on 2nd November 2026. Source: UnitedRugby.com
Rules for classification: Tiebreakers for teams tied on points: 1) Number of matches won 2) The difference between points for and points against 3) The number of tries scored 4) The most points scored 5) The difference between tries for and tries against 6) The fewest red cards received 7) The fewest yellow cards received.

=== URC Scottish–Italian Shield ===
Glasgow Warriors enter the Shield as defending champions, and four-time winners of the competition.

2026–27 United Rugby Championship Regional Shield tables
(Italy) (Scotland) Italian x Scottish Shield
	Team	P	W	D	L	PF	PA	PD	TF	TA	TBP	LBP	Pts	Pos overall
1	(Italy) Benetton	2	1	0	1	51	36	+15	6	6	1	1	6	10
2	(Scotland) Glasgow Warriors	1	1	0	0	24	20	+4	4	2	1	0	5	1
3	(Scotland) Edinburgh	2	1	0	1	41	43	–2	6	6	1	0	5	5
4	(Italy) Zebre Parma	1	0	0	1	12	29	–17	2	4	0	0	0	16
If teams are level at any stage, tiebreakers are applied in the following order: 1. number of matches won 2. the difference between points for and points against 3. the number of tries scored 4. the most points scored 5. the difference between tries for and tries against 6. the fewest red cards received 7. the fewest yellow cards received
Green background indicates teams currently leading the regional shield. Upon the conclusion of the regular season, these teams win their respective regional shields. (S) : URC Shield champion

== European Rugby Champions Cup ==
Having finished top of the 2025–26 United Rugby Championship, Glasgow Warriors qualified for the 2026–27 European Rugby Champions Cup. On 1 July, Glasgow were drawn with URC champions Leinster Rugby (who Glasgow will not face as they are from the same league competition), English sides Sale Sharks and Leicester Tigers, and French teams Pau and Clermont.

=== Pool stage ===
==== Matches ====
17 October 2026	Sale Sharks (England)	27–47	(Scotland) Glasgow Warriors (1 BP)	CorpAcq Stadium, Manchester
13:00	Try: Curry 3' c Reed (2) 9' m, 67' m Ma'asi-White 58' c Con: Ford (2/4) 4', 59'; Pen: Ford (1/2) 28'; Cards: Warr (yellow card) 16'; Roebuck (yellow card) 17'	Report	Try: Penalty try 15'; Steyn 21' c Dobie 31' c Craig 47' m Darge 65' c Smith 72' c T. Tuipulotu 76' c Con: Horne (4/5) 22', 32', 65', 73'; Lancaster (1/1) 77'	Attendance: 4,582; Referee: Craig Evans (Wales)

11 December 2026	Glasgow Warriors	v	Section Paloise	Scotstoun Stadium, Glasgow
20:00 GMT (UTC)

8 January 2027	Glasgow Warriors	v	Leicester Tigers	Scotstoun Stadium, Glasgow
20:00 GMT (UTC)

16 January 2027	ASM Clermont Auvergne	v	Glasgow Warriors	Stade Marcel-Michelin, Clermont-Ferrand
21:00 CET (UTC+1)

==== Standings ====
European Rugby Champions Cup Pool 1
Pos	Team	Pld	W	D	L	PF	PA	PD	TF	TA	TB	LB	Pts	Qualification
1	(Ireland) Leinster	1	1	0	0	48	23	+25	7	2	1	0	5	Champions Cup round of 16.
2	(France) Pau	1	1	0	0	41	17	+24	5	2	1	0	5	Champions Cup round of 16.
3	(Scotland) Glasgow Warriors	1	1	0	0	47	27	+20	7	4	1	0	5	Champions Cup round of 16.
4	(England) Sale Sharks	1	0	0	1	27	47	−20	4	7	0	0	0	Champions Cup or Challenge Cup round of 16 based on table points amongst non-top-three teams.
5	(England) Leicester Tigers	1	0	0	1	17	41	−24	2	5	0	0	0	Champions Cup or Challenge Cup round of 16 based on table points amongst non-top-three teams.
6	(France) Clermont	1	0	0	1	23	48	−25	2	7	0	0	0	Champions Cup or Challenge Cup round of 16 based on table points amongst non-top-three teams.

Updated to match(es) played on 18 October 2026. Source: EPCR
Rules for classification: Tiebreakers for teams tied on points: 1) Number of matches won; 2) Difference between points for and against; 3) Total number of points for; 4) Aggregate number of points scored in matches between tied teams; 5) Number of matches won excluding the first match, then the second and so on until the tie is settled.

== Warrior of the month awards ==
Monteith Insurance became the title sponsor of the Warrior of the month this season.

Award	Winner
September	
October	
November	
December	
January	
February	
March	
April	
May	

== Competitive debuts this season ==
A player's nationality shown is taken from the nationality at the highest honour for the national side obtained; or if never capped internationally their place of birth. Senior caps take precedence over junior caps or place of birth; junior caps take precedence over place of birth. A player's nationality at debut may be different from the nationality shown. Combination sides like the British and Irish Lions or Pacific Islanders are not national sides, or nationalities.

Players in BOLD font have been capped by their senior international XV side as nationality shown.

Players in Italic font have capped either by their international 7s side; or by the international XV 'A' side as nationality shown.

Players in normal font have not been capped at senior level.

A position in parentheses indicates that the player debuted as a substitute. A player may have made a prior debut for Glasgow Warriors in a non-competitive match, 'A' match or 7s match; these matches are not listed.

Tournaments where competitive debut made:

**Scottish Inter-District Championship**	**Welsh–Scottish League**	**WRU Challenge Cup**	**Celtic League**	**Celtic Cup**	**1872 Cup**	**Pro12**	**Pro14**	**Rainbow Cup**	**United Rugby Championship**	**European Challenge Cup**	**Heineken Cup / European Champions Cup**

Crosshatching indicates a jointly hosted match.

Number	Player nationality	Name	Position	Date of debut	Venue	Stadium	Opposition nationality	Opposition side	Tournament	Match result	Scoring debut
378	(Australia)	Bayley Kuenzle	(Centre)	2026-09-26	Away	Thomond Park	(Ireland)	Munster	United Rugby Championship	Win	Nil
379	(Scotland)	Callum Reidy	(Scrum Half)	2026-10-09	Home	Scotstoun Stadium	(Ireland)	Connacht	United Rugby Championship	Win	Nil
380	(South Africa)	Ruwald van der Merwe	No. 8	2026-10-17	Away	CorpAcq Stadium	(England)	Sale Sharks	European Champions Cup	Win	Nil
381	(Australia)	Tavi Tuipulotu	(Hooker)	2026-10-17	Away	CorpAcq Stadium	(England)	Sale Sharks	European Champions Cup	Win	5 pts
382	(Scotland)	**Jamie Ritchie**	Flanker	2026-10-24	Away	Stadio Comunale di Monigo	(Italy)	Benetton Treviso	United Rugby Championship	Win	Nil
383	(Scotland)	Jake Shearer	Prop	2026-10-30	Home	Scotstoun Stadium	(South Africa)	Lions	United Rugby Championship	Win	Nil
384	(England)	**Jack Singleton**	Hooker	2026-10-30	Home	Scotstoun Stadium	(South Africa)	Lions	United Rugby Championship	Win	5 pts

== Sponsorship ==
- SP Energy Networks – Title Sponsor and Community Sponsor

=== Official kit supplier ===
- Macron

=== Official kit sponsors ===
- Malcolm Group
- Ross Hall Hospital
- Arnold Clark
- Allied Mobility
- Love Loan

=== Official sponsors ===
- The Famous Grouse
- Strathclyde Sport
- Denholm Energy Services
- Harper Macleod
- KubeNet
- Mackenzie Construction
- The Scot JCB Group
- Tennents
- Fosroc
- Cameron House
- Monteith Insurance

=== Official partners ===
- Affordable Golf
- Atlas Maintenance
- The Botanist
- Cairnhill
- First Bus
- Glasgow Airport
- HF Group
- Hilton Glasgow
- Loch Lomond Golf Club
- Old Schoolhouse
- One Four Nine Wealth
- Quality Meat Scotland
- The Superlative Collection
- The Park Practice
- Selective Personnel
