= 2025–26 Glasgow Warriors season =

Glasgow Warriors
- 2025–26 season
- Head coach: Franco Smith
- Chairman: Charles Shaw
- United Rugby Championship: Semi-finals; 1st, regular season
- Champions Cup: Quarter-finals
- URC Scottish-Italian Shield: Champion (4th title)
- 1872 Cup: Retained (12th title)
- Top try scorer: League: Gregor Hiddleston; Kyle Steyn; Jamie Dobie – 7
- Top points scorer: League: George Horn – 76
- Highest home attendance: 21,093 RD 7 v Edinburgh
- Lowest home attendance: 6,476
- Average home attendance: 8,532

The 2025–26 season saw Glasgow Warriors compete in the 2025–26 United Rugby Championship, and also in the European Champions Cup. In addition to the two main competitions, Glasgow also compete for the URC Scottish–Italian Shield and for the 1872 Cup, where they are the reigning champion in both competitions from the previous season.

== Team ==
=== Coaching staff ===
- Head coach: (South Africa) Franco Smith
- Assistant coach: (Ireland) Nigel Carolan
- Assistant coach: (Scotland) Scott Forrest
- Assistant coach: (Scotland) Roddy Grant
- Scrum Coach: (Scotland) Alasdair Dickinson
- Senior Academy Coach: (Scotland) Shade Munro

=== Squad ===
Hookers (Scotland) Angus Fraser (Scotland) Gregor Hiddleston (Scotland) Johnny Matthews (Scotland) Seb Stephen (Scotland) Grant Stewart (Australia) Tavi Tuipulotu Props (Scotland) Jamie Bhatti (Scotland) Zander Fagerson (Scotland) Nathan McBeth (Scotland) Fin Richardson (Namibia) Patrick Schickerling (Scotland) Rory Sutherland (Australia) Sam Talakai (Scotland) Murphy Walker Locks (Scotland) Ryan Burke (Scotland) Alex Craig (Scotland) Scott Cummings (Scotland) Jare Oguntibeju (Scotland) Alex Samuel (Scotland) Max Williamson	Loose forwards (Scotland) Gregor Brown (Scotland) Rory Darge (Scotland) Jack Dempsey (Scotland) Macenzzie Duncan (Scotland) Matt Fagerson (Scotland) Euan Ferrie (Scotland) Ally Miller (Tonga) Sione Vailanu Scrum-halves (Scotland) Ben Afshar (Scotland) Jamie Dobie (Scotland) George Horne (Scotland) Jack Oliver Fly-halves (Scotland) Adam Hastings (Scotland) Dan Lancaster (Australia) Charlie Savala (Scotland) Matthew Urwin (Scotland) Duncan Weir	Centres (Scotland) Huw Jones (Scotland) Stafford McDowall (Scotland) Duncan Munn (Scotland) Kyle Steyn (Scotland) Sione Tuipulotu (Scotland) Johnny Ventisei (Scotland) Kerr Yule Back three (Scotland) Kerr Johnston (New Zealand) Josh McKay (Scotland) Kyle Rowe (Scotland) Ollie Smith (Scotland) Fergus Watson

=== Academy ===
==== Scottish Rugby Academy Stage 3 players ====
These players are given a professional contract by the Scottish Rugby Academy. Although given placements they are not contracted by Glasgow Warriors. Players graduate from the academy when a professional club contract is offered.

These players are assigned to Glasgow Warriors for the season 2025–26.

Academy players promoted in the course of the season are listed with the main squad.

- (Scotland) Jackson Rennie – Prop
- (Scotland) Jake Shearer – Prop
- (Scotland) Oliver McKenna – Prop
- (Scotland) Joe Roberts – Hooker
- (Scotland) Dan Halkon – Lock
- (Scotland) Dylan Cockburn – Flanker
- (Scotland) Archie McMichael – Flanker
- (Scotland) Jonny Morris – Flanker
- (Scotland) Rory Purvis – Flanker
- (Scotland) Brent Jackson – Scrum-half
- (Scotland) Alex Brydon – Centre
- (Scotland) Ben Salmon – Centre
- (Scotland) Harry Provan – Wing
- (Scotland) Cameron Van Wyk – Wing

==== Back up players ====
Other players used by Glasgow Warriors over the course of the season.

- (Scotland) Callum Reidy (Glasgow Hawks) – Scrum-half

== Player statistics ==
During the 2025–26 season, Glasgow have used 48 different players in competitive games. The table below shows the number of appearances and points scored by each player.

Position	Nation	Name	United Rugby Championship			Champions Cup			Total	
Position	Nation	Name	Apps (sub)	Tries	Points kicked	Apps (sub)	Tries	Points kicked	Apps (sub)	Total Pts
HK	(Scotland)	Angus Fraser	6(4)	0	0	(2)	0	0	6(6)	0
HK	(Scotland)	Gregor Hiddleston	5(10)	7	0	6	3	0	11(10)	50
HK	(Scotland)	Johnny Matthews	10(2)	5	0	0	0	0	10(2)	25
HK	(Scotland)	Seb Stephen	4(6)	3	0	(6)	1	0	4(12)	20
HK	(Scotland)	Grant Stewart	(1)	0	0	0	0	0	(1)	0
PR	(Scotland)	Jamie Bhatti	7(1)	0	0	(2)	0	0	7(3)	0
PR	(Scotland)	Zander Fagerson	5(3)	0	0	6	0	0	11(3)	0
PR	(Scotland)	Nathan McBeth	2(8)	2	0	2	0	0	4(8)	10
PR	(Scotland)	Fin Richardson	7	0	0	0	0	0	7	0
PR	(Namibia)	Patrick Schickerling	8(4)	2	0	4	1	0	12(4)	15
PR	(Scotland)	Rory Sutherland	3(6)	0	0	(4)	0	0	3(10)	0
PR	(Australia)	Sam Talakai	1(15)	1	0	(6)	0	0	1(21)	5
PR	(Scotland)	Murphy Walker	5(1)	0	0	0	0	0	5(1)	0
LK	(Scotland)	Ryan Burke	1(1)	0	0	0	0	0	1(1)	0
LK	(Scotland)	Alex Craig	6(6)	0	0	2(2)	0	0	8(8)	0
LK	(Scotland)	Scott Cummings	4(4)	0	0	4	0	0	8(4)	0
LK	(Scotland)	Jare Oguntibeju	8(6)	3	0	1	0	0	9(6)	15
LK	(Scotland)	Alex Samuel	11(4)	0	0	2	0	0	13(4)	0
LK	(Scotland)	Max Williamson	6(4)	1	0	3(2)	1	0	9(6)	10
BR	(Scotland)	Gregor Brown	6(3)	1	0	(4)	1	0	6(7)	10
BR	(Scotland)	Dylan Cockburn	(3)	0	0	0	0	0	(3)	0
BR	(Scotland)	Rory Darge	6(1)	2	0	5	1	0	11(1)	15
BR	(Scotland)	Jack Dempsey	9	1	0	6	2	0	15	15
BR	(Scotland)	Macenzzie Duncan	7(5)	2	0	0	0	0	7(5)	10
BR	(Scotland)	Matt Fagerson	8(1)	1	0	6	0	0	14(1)	5
BR	(Scotland)	Euan Ferrie	10(4)	1	0	1(3)	1	0	11(7)	10
BR	(Scotland)	Ally Miller	4(4)	0	0	(3)	0	0	4(7)	0
BR	(Tonga)	Sione Vailanu	3(6)	0	0	0	0	0	3(6)	0
SH	(Scotland)	Ben Afshar	6(8)	0	0	2(3)	0	0	8(11)	0
SH	(Scotland)	Jamie Dobie	6(1)	7	0	2(1)	0	0	8(2)	35
SH	(Scotland)	George Horne	10(2)	6	46	3(1)	1	14	13(3)	95
SH	(Scotland)	Jack Oliver	1(7)	0	0	0	0	0	1(7)	0
FH	(Scotland)	Adam Hastings	10(4)	1	42	2(2)	0	19	12(6)	66
FH	(Scotland)	Dan Lancaster	9(8)	2	23	4(1)	0	6	13(9)	39
FH	(Scotland)	Matthew Urwin	(1)	0	0	0	0	0	(1)	0
FH	(Scotland)	Duncan Weir	(1)	1	3	0	0	0	(1)	8
CE	(Scotland)	Huw Jones	4	0	0	2	1	0	6	5
CE	(Scotland)	Stafford McDowall	15(2)	4	0	4(2)	3	0	19(4)	35
CE	(Scotland)	Duncan Munn	1	0	0	0	0	0	1	0
CE	(Scotland)	Sione Tuipulotu	12(1)	1	0	6	1	0	18(1)	10
CE	(Scotland)	Johnny Ventisei	1	0	0	0	0	0	1	0
CE	(Scotland)	Kerr Yule	4	0	0	0	0	0	4	0
WG	(Scotland)	Kerr Johnston	1	0	0	0	0	0	1	0
WG	(Scotland)	Kyle Rowe	14	6	0	2	0	0	16	30
WG	(Scotland)	Kyle Steyn	11	5	0	6	4	0	17	45
WG	(Scotland)	Fergus Watson	2	1	0	0	0	0	2	5
FB	(New Zealand)	Josh McKay	13	3	0	4	1	0	17	20
FB	(Scotland)	Ollie Smith	13(3)	4	2	5	2	0	18(3)	32

== Staff movements ==
=== Coaches ===
==== Personnel in ====
- Scott Forrest from Scotland U20 (Asst.)
- (Scotland) Roddy Grant from (Georgia (country)) Georgia (Asst.)

==== Personnel out ====
- (Scotland) Peter Murchie to (Japan) Kobelco Kobe Steelers

=== Staff ===
==== Personnel out ====
(Scotland) Alastair Kellock to (Scotland) SRU Head of Performance Pathways

== Player movements ==
=== Academy promotions ===
- (Scotland) Jack Oliver from Scottish Rugby Academy
- (Scotland) Macenzzie Duncan from Scottish Rugby Academy
- (Scotland) Matthew Urwin from Scottish Rugby Academy
- (Scotland) Johnny Ventisei from Scottish Rugby Academy
- (Scotland) Fergus Watson from Scottish Rugby Academy
- (Scotland) Seb Stephen from Scottish Rugby Academy
- (Scotland) Kerr Yule from Scottish Rugby Academy
- (Scotland) Kerr Johnston from Scottish Rugby Academy
- (Scotland) Ryan Burke from Scottish Rugby Academy

=== Player transfers ===
==== In ====
- (Scotland) Alex Craig from (Wales) Scarlets
- (Australia) Charlie Savala from (England) Northampton Saints
- (England) Dan Lancaster from (France) Racing 92
- (Australia) Tavi Tuipulotu from (Australia) NSW Waratahs

==== Out ====
- (Scotland) Tom Jordan to (England) Bristol Bears
- (South Africa) Henco Venter to (France) CA Brive
- (Scotland) Jack Mann to (England) Gloucester
- (Argentina) Sebastián Cancelliere to (Argentina) Hindú Club
- (Argentina) Facundo Cordero released
- (Scotland) Sean Kennedy released
- (South Africa) JP du Preez to (Japan) Red Hurricanes Osaka
- (Scotland) Logan Trotter released
- (Scotland) Amena Caqusau to (England) Northampton Saints
- (Scotland) Aidan Cross to (England) Doncaster Knights
- (Scotland) Callum Smyth to (England) Worcester Warriors
- (Scotland) Richie Simpson to (England) Ealing Trailfinders
- (Scotland) Duncan Munn to (Australia) North Brisbane Rugby Club (loan out)

== Competitions ==
=== Pre-season and friendlies ===
A pre-season march against Northampton Saints has been announced. An earlier away match to the English champions Bath was later announced.

6 September 2025
15:00

Bath (England)	47–14	(Scotland) Glasgow Warriors
Try: Cuckson; Cowan; Arundell (2); Butt; Roux; Carr-Smith; Con: Donoghue (5); Linegar	Preview; Report; Report; Report	Try: Penalty try Jackson; Con: Lancaster

Recreation Ground, Bath
Attendance: 11,000
Referee: Adam Leal

Bath: 1 Scott Kirk, 2 Jasper Spandler, 3 Kieran Verden, 4 Will Jeanes, 5 Harvey Cuckson, 6 Ewan Richards (c), 7 Thompson Cowan, 8 Arthur Green, 9 Bernard van der Linde, 10 Ciaran Donoghue, 11 Charlie Griffin, 12 Will Butt, 13 Chris Harris, 14 Austin Emens, 15 Sam Winters
Replacements: Henry Arundell, Henry Bartlett, Jack Bennett, Tom Carr-Smith, Joe Cokanasiga, Tom de Glanville, Tom Dunn, Alfie Griffin, Jack Harrison, Neil le Roux, James Linegar, James Maloney, Ross Molony, Max Pearce, Miles Reid, Quinn Roux, Ethan Staddon, Mikey Summerfield, Francois van Wyk, Claudius Wheeler
Glasgow Warriors: 1 Jake Shearer, 2 Grant Stewart, 3 Fin Richardson, 4 Ryan Burke, 5 Jare Oguntibeju, 6 Macenzzie Duncan, 7 Joe Roberts, 8 Euan Ferrie (c), 9 Jack Oliver, 10 Matthew Urwin, 11 Ben Salmon, 12 Kerr Yule, 13 Kerr Johnston, 14 Cameron van Wyk, 15 Fergus Watson
Replacements: Seb Stephen, Gregor Hiddleston, Nathan McBeth, Rory Sutherland, Sam Talakai, Max Williamson, Dan Halkon, Dylan Cockburn, Angus Fraser, Ben Afshar, Brent Jackson, Dan Lancaster, Johnny Ventisei, Josh McKay, Ollie Smith

12 September 2025
19:30

Glasgow Warriors (Scotland)	40–31	(England) Northampton Saints
Try: Dan Lancaster; Jack Oliver; Gregor Hiddleston (2); Johnny Matthews; Josh McKay; Con: Dan Lancaster (4); Matthew Urwin	Preview; Report; Report; Report	Try: Callum Chick; Tom Pearson (2); George Hendy (2); Con: Anthony Belleau (3)

Scotstoun Stadium, Glasgow
Referee: Ruairidh Campbell

Glasgow Warriors: 1 Nathan McBeth, 2 Gregor Hiddleston, 3 Fin Richardson, 4 Max Williamson, 5 Alex Samuel, 6 Euan Ferrie (c), 7 Macenzzie Duncan, 8 Jack Dempsey, 9 Ben Afshar, 10 Dan Lancaster, 11 Ollie Smith, 12 Kerr Yule, 13 Kerr Johnston, 14 Fergus Watson, 15 Josh McKay
Replacements: Johnny Matthews, Jake Shearer, Sam Talakai, Jare Oguntibeju, Gregor Brown, Angus Fraser, Jack Oliver, Matthew Urwin, Ben Salmon, Johnny Ventisei, Jamie Bhatti, Seb Stephen, Dylan Cockburn, Brent Jackson, Alex Bryden
Northampton Saints: 1 Emmanuel Iyogun, 2 Craig Wright, 3 Cleopas Kundiona, 4 Ed Prowse, 5 Tom Lockett, 6 Tom Pearson, 7 Sam Graham, 8 Callum Chick, 9 Archie McParland, 10 Anthony Belleau, 11 Amena Caqusau, 12 Toby Thame, 13 Rory Hutchinson, 14 Edoardo Todaro, 15 James Ramm (c)
Replacements: Henry Walker, Danilo Fischetti, Elliott Millar Mills, Oliver Scola, Luke Green, Chunya Munga, Angus Scott-Young, Archie Benson, Fyn Brown, Jonny Weimann, Tom James, James Pater, James Martin, Tom Litchfield, Tom Rowe, George Hendy

25 October 2025
15:00

Edinburgh Rugby 'A' (Scotland)	35–26	(Scotland) Glasgow Warriors 'A'
Try: Currie; Blyth-Lafferty (2); McKenzie; Jessop; Con: Wolfenden (5)	Preview; Report; Report; Report	Try: Watson (2); Stephen; Jackson; Con: Urwin

Edinburgh Rugby Stadium, Edinburgh

Edinburgh 'A': 1. Mikey Jones, 2. Jerry Blyth-Lafferty, 3. Ollie Blyth-Lafferty, 4. Euan McVie, 5. Christian Lindsay, 6. Tom Dodd (c), 7. Freddy Douglas, 8. Tom Currie, 9. Adam McKenzie (NTP/Watsonians), 10. Ross Wolfenden, 11. Rory McHaffie, 12. Henry Kesterton, 13. Nairn Moncrieff, 14. Malelili Satala, 15. Henry Widdowson
Replacements: 16. Jack Utterson, 17. Ben White, 18. Jamie Stewart, 19. Mac Rutherford, 20. Henry Jackaman (NTP/Watsonians), 21. Freddie Nickalls (The University of Edinburgh), 22. Callum Jessop (NTP/Heriot's), 23. Luca Mathieson (Newcastle University)
Glasgow Warriors 'A': 1. Jake Shearer, 2. Angus Fraser, 3. Patrick Shickerling, 4. Ryan Burke, 5. Jare Oguntibeju, 6. Dylan Cockburn, 7. Macenzzie Duncan, 8. Ally Miller (c), 9. Jack Oliver, 10. Matthew Urwin, 11. Ben Salmon, 12. Kerr Yule, 13. Kerr Johnston, 14. Cameron Van Wyk, 15. Fergus Watson
Replacements: Joe Roberts, Ollie McKenna, Finn Richardson, Johnny Morris, Brent Jackson, Duncan Weir, Johnny Ventisei, Alex Bryden

=== United Rugby Championship ===
==== Matches ====
The full fixture list was announced on 21 May 2025.

26 September 2025	(1 BP) Glasgow Warriors (Scotland)	35–19	(South Africa) Sharks	Scotstoun Stadium, Glasgow
20:05	Try: Rowe 14' c McDowall 32' c Darge 49' c Dobie 70' c Penalty try 78'; Con: Horne (4) 15', 33', 51', 71'	Report, 2	Try: E. van der Merwe 9'; Tshituka 40'; Am 66'; Con: Hendrikse (2) 41', 67'; Cards: Mavesere (yellow card) 77'; Mazibujo (yellow card) 79'	Attendance: 6,775; Referee: Keith David

4 October 2025	Benetton (Italy)	16–14	(Scotland) Glasgow Warriors (1 BP)	Stadio Comunale di Monigo, Treviso
17:30	Try: Menoncello 51' c Con: Umaga 53'; Pen: Umaga (2) 26', 71'; Drop: R. Smith 80+1'; Cards: Cannone (yellow card) 67'	Report	Try: Oguntibeju 19' c McKay 29' c Con: A. Hastings (2) 20', 30'	Attendance: 4,806; Referee: Ben Connor

11 October 2025	(1 BP) Glasgow Warriors (Scotland)	49–0	(Wales) Dragons	Scotstoun Stadium, Glasgow
17:30	Try: Steyn 10' c Horne (2) 25' c, 62' c Brown 43' c Hiddleston 47' c Matthews 67' c Penalty try 80'; Con: Hastings (4) 11', 26', 43', 48'; Horne 62'; Lancaster 68'	Report	Cards: Dyer (yellow card) 80+1'	Attendance: 6,800

18 October 2025	Ospreys	17–42	Glasgow Warriors (1 BP)	Brewery Field, Bridgend
19:45	Try: Morgan-williams (13'); Morgan (45'); Con: Edwards (14', 46'); Pen: Edwards (24'); Cards: Lake (yellow card) 29'	Report	Try: Dobie (2) 9' c, 50' c Steyn 16' c Matthews 40+1' c Ferrie 62' c Duncan 76' c Con: A Hastings (5) 9', 17', 40+2', 51', 63'; Lancaster 77'	Attendance: 4,861; Referee: Andrea Piardi (Italy)

24 October 2025	Glasgow Warriors (Scotland)	21–12	(South Africa) Bulls	Scotstoun Stadium, Glasgow
19:45	Try: Tuipulotu 5' c Penalty try 65'; McBeth 70' c Con: Hastings (2) 6', 71'; Cards: McBeth (yellow card) 53'	Report; Scoreboard	Try: Jacobs 11' m Le Roux 49' c Con: Johannes 49'; Cards: Klopper (yellow card) 65'	Attendance: 6,848; Referee: Craig Evans (Wales)

29 November 2025	Scarlets (Wales)	23–0	(Scotland) Glasgow Warriors	Parc y Scarlets, Llanelli
19:45	Try: MacLeod 16' c Page 49' c Con: Costelow (2/2) 17', 50'; Pen: Costelow (3) 25', 31', 67'; Cards: Cuckson (yellow card) 71'	Report		Attendance: 5,444; Referee: Christopher Allison (South Africa)

20 December 2025	(1 BP) Glasgow Warriors (Scotland)	24–12	(Scotland) Edinburgh	Hampden Park, Glasgow
15:00	Try: Fagerson 10' c Darge 51' c Hiddleston 55' m Stephen 77' m Con: Hastngs (2) 11', 51'	Report	Try: Richardson 28' m Gilchrist 72' c Con: Thompson 72'; Cards: Hunter-Hill (yellow card) 77'	Attendance: 21,093; Referee: Eoghan Cross (IRFU)

27 December 2025	Edinburgh (Scotland)	3–21	(Scotland) Glasgow Warriors	Murrayfield Stadium, Edinburgh
15:00	Pen: Scott 6'	Report	Try: Dobie (2) 32' c, 79' c Horne 76' c Con: Adam Hastings 33'; Horne 77'; Lancaster 80'; Cards: Fraser (yellow card) 21'	Attendance: 38,179; Referee: Hollie Davidson (SRU)

3 January 2026	(1 BP) Glasgow Warriors (Scotland)	47–10	(Italy) Zebre Parma	Scotstoun Stadium, Glasgow
19:45	Try: McDowall 13'c Smith 20'c Stephen 39' m Dobie 59' c, 78' c Hiddleston 74' c Weir 77' c Con: Hastings (2) 13', 21'; Weir (3) 60', 74', 78'; Lancaster 79'	Report	Try: Bertaccini 23' m Quattrini 48' m Cards: Reggeri (yellow card) 40'	Attendance: 6,476; Referee: Ben Breakspear (Wales)

24 January 2026	(1 BP) Zebre Parma (Italy)	21–26	(Scotland) Glasgow Warriors (1 BP)	Stadio Sergio Lanfranchi, Parma
19:45	Try: Carrera 31' c Bertaccini 47' c Pani 69' c Con: Roger Farias (2/2) 31', 48'; Montemauri (1/1) 70'; Cards: Odiase (yellow card) 19'; Carrera (yellow card) 52'; Krumov (yellow card) 64'	Report	Try: Penalty try 18'; Hiddleston (2) 24' c, 33' c Hastings 66' m Con: Horne (2/3) 25', 34'; Cards: Hastings (yellow card) 45'	Attendance: 1,803; Referee: Robbie Jenkinson

30 January 2026	(1 BP) Glasgow Warriors (Scotland)	31–22	(Ireland) Munster (1 BP)	Scotstoun Stadium, Glasgow
19:45	Try: Smith 7' c Lancaster 8' c Oguntibeju 33' c McKay 40' c Con: Lancaster (4/4) 8', 9', 34', 40+1'; Pen: Lancaster 74'	Report	Try: Coughlan 11' m Kelly 51' m Gleeson 61' m Kilgallen 67' c Con: Wood (1/2) 68'; Cards: Abrahams (yellow card) 39'; O'Donoghue (yellow card) 80+3'	Attendance: 7,351; Referee: Craig Evans (Wales)

28 February 2026	Connacht (Ireland)	15–10	(Scotland) Glasgow Warriors (1 BP)	The Sportsground, Galway
15:00	Try: J Murphy 74' c Jansen 80+1' m Con: Gilbert 75'; Pen: Gilbert 25'; Cards: Joyce (yellow card) 63'	Report	Try: Rowe (2) 62' m, 67' m	Attendance: 8,654; Referee: Ben Breakspear

21 March 2026	(1 BP) Glasgow Warriors (Scotland)	38–17	(Ireland) Leinster	Scotstoun Stadium, Glasgow
17:30	Try: Duncan 27' c Hiddleston 31' m Horne (2) 34' c, 78' m Rowe 37' c Smith 69' c Con: Horne (4/6) 28', 35', 38', 70'; Cards: Hastings (yellow card) 78'		Try: Kenny 17' m Keenan 41' c Frawley 73' m Con: Prendergast (1/3) 42'; Cards: Deeny (yellow card) 26'; Kelleher (yellow card) 29'; Slimani (yellow card) 79'	Attendance: 7,321

27 March 2026	(1 BP) Glasgow Warriors (Scotland)	31–10	(Italy) Benetton	Scotstoun Stadium, Glasgow
19:45	Try: Matthews 38' c Watson 42' c Williamson 60' m Stephen 67' m Talakai 73' c Con: Hastings 39', 43'; Lancaster 74'	Report	Try: Odogwu 15' c Con: Smith 16'; Pen: Smith 40+1'; Cards: Odogwu (yellow card) 23'	Attendance: 7,266; Referee: Ben Breakspear (Wales)

18 April 2026	(1 BP) Lions (South Africa)	54–12	(Scotland) Glasgow Warriors	Ellis Park Stadium, Johannesburg
16:00	Try: Van Wyk (2) 6' c, 19' c Cronjé 10' m SJ Kotze 40' c Venter 44' c Van den Berg 68' c Mahashe 72' c Q. Horn 75' c Con: Chris William Smith (7/8) 7', 19', 41', 45', 69', 73', 76'		Try: Lancaster 31' c McDowall 58' m Con: Lancaster (1/2) 32'	Attendance: 3,677; Referee: Peter Martin (Ireland)

25 April 2026	(1 BP) Stormers (South Africa)	48–12	(Scotland) Glasgow Warriors	Cape Town Stadium
12:30 (rearranged)	Try: Mchunu (2) 9' c, 14' c Roos 29' c Nel 49' c Feinberg-Mngomezulu 72' c Morabe 78' c Con: Feinberg-Mngomezulu (6/6) 10', 15', 30', 49', 73', 77'; Pen: Feinberg-Mngomezulu 5', 43'; Cards: Reinach (yellow card) 37'	Report, 2, 3	Try: O. Smith 25' m Hiddleston 38' c Con: Hastings (1/2) 38'; Cards: Dempsey (yellow card) 14'; Hastings (yellow card) 42'	Attendance: 23,740; Referee: Eoghan Cross (Ireland)

8 May 2026	(1 BP) Glasgow Warriors (Scotland)	40–17	(Wales) Cardiff	Scotstoun Stadium, Glasgow
19:45	Try: Dempsey 19' c Steyn 24' c Matthews (2) 32' c, 54' c Schickerling 65' m Rowe 74' c Con: Horne (4/5) 20', 26', 33', 55'; O Smith (1/1) 74'	Report	Try: J Adams 28' c Southworth 59' m Beetham 80' m Con: Sheedy (1/3) 29'	Attendance: 7,321; Referee: Eoghan Cross (Ireland)

15 May 2026	(2 BP) Ulster (Ireland)	22–26	(Scotland) Glasgow Warriors (1 BP)	Ravenhill Stadium, Belfast
19:45	Try: Z Ward (2) 19', 33'; Mcilroy 59'; Murphy 68'; Con: Flannery 33'	Report	Try: McDowall 8' c McBeth 37' c Horne 40+2' c Rowe 76' m Con: Horne (3/4) 9', 38', 40+3'; Cards: McBeth (yellow card) 22'; McKay (yellow card) 45'	Attendance: 11,556; Referee: Gianluca Gnecchi (Italy)

==== Table ====
Pos	Team	Pld	W	D	L	PF	PA	PD	TF	TA	TB	LB	Pts	Qualification
1	Glasgow Warriors	18	13	0	5	479	338	+141	72	48	11	2	65	Qualification for the Champions Cup and knockout stage
2	Leinster (CH)	18	12	0	6	515	370	+145	77	51	13	2	63	Qualification for the Champions Cup and knockout stage
3	Stormers	18	12	1	5	504	344	+160	63	48	9	1	60	Qualification for the Champions Cup and knockout stage
4	Bulls (RU)	18	12	0	6	576	406	+170	82	59	10	1	59	Qualification for the Champions Cup and knockout stage
5	Munster	18	11	0	7	396	376	+20	59	51	8	3	55	Qualification for the Champions Cup and knockout stage
6	Cardiff	18	11	0	7	353	372	−19	52	52	7	4	55	Qualification for the Champions Cup and knockout stage
7	Lions	18	10	1	7	532	473	+59	73	70	9	3	54	Qualification for the Champions Cup and knockout stage
8	Connacht	18	10	0	8	442	395	+47	62	56	10	4	54	Qualification for the Champions Cup and knockout stage
9	Ulster	18	9	1	8	494	420	+74	72	60	10	4	52	Qualification for the Challenge Cup
10	Sharks	18	8	1	9	467	428	+39	71	57	9	3	46	Qualification for the Challenge Cup
11	Ospreys	18	7	2	9	376	454	−78	55	69	4	3	39	Qualification for the Challenge Cup
12	Edinburgh	18	7	0	11	362	439	−77	57	66	6	4	38	Qualification for the Challenge Cup
13	Benetton	18	6	2	10	327	493	−166	41	71	4	1	33	Qualification for the Challenge Cup
14	Scarlets	18	4	2	12	361	460	−99	52	63	3	5	28	Qualification for the Challenge Cup
15	Dragons	18	3	4	11	350	481	−131	46	71	4	4	28	Qualification for the Challenge Cup
16	Zebre	18	2	0	16	312	587	−275	43	85	3	4	15	Qualification for the Challenge Cup

Updated to match(es) played on 16 May 2026. Source: UnitedRugby.com
Rules for classification: Tiebreakers for teams tied on points: 1) Number of matches won 2) The difference between points for and points against 3) The number of tries scored 4) The most points scored 5) The difference between tries for and tries against 6) The fewest red cards received 7) The fewest yellow cards received.

=== Playoffs ===
The top eight teams in the regular season standings advance to the knockout stage, a single-elimination tournament culminating in a Grand Final to crown the overall champion.

Teams are seeded based on the regular season standings, with teams ranked 1–4 receiving home field advantage in the quarter-final, with 1 playing 8, 2 playing 7 etc. The top two teams in the standings are seeded so as not to meet until the Grand Final.

Home-field advantage for the semi-finals and Grand Final will be awarded to the highest-ranked team in each tie; the top two teams are therefore guaranteed home advantage until the final for as long as they remain in the tournament, and the top ranked team, Glasgow Warriors, in the standings will be awarded home advantage should they reach the Grand Final. In the build up to the final week of the regular season, it was reported that Glasgow Warriors may be forced to play a semi-final and final outside Scotland due to venue unavailability, although they would technically remain the home team. In the week of the quarter-final, it was announced they would, if they progressed, play their semi-final and Grand Final on home soil, at Murrayfield Stadium, Edinburgh.

Cardiff and Lions both made the play-offs for the first time. Stormers, Glasgow Warriors, Leinster, Munster and Bulls reached their fifth URC play-off phase from five seasons. Glasgow Warriors became the first non-Irish team to top the regular season table and take the number one seeding since they did so themselves in 2019.

Quarter-finals
1	(Scotland) Glasgow Warriors	33
8	(Ireland) Connacht	21
4	(South Africa) Bulls	45
5	(Ireland) Munster	14
3	(South Africa) Stormers	44
6	(Wales) Cardiff	21
2	(Ireland) Leinster	59
7	(South Africa) Lions	10

Semi-finals
1	(Scotland) Glasgow Warriors	21
4	(South Africa) Bulls	22
2	(Ireland) Leinster	20
3	(South Africa) Stormers	11

Final
2	(Ireland) Leinster	36
4	(South Africa) Bulls	7

Quarter-final

29 May 2026	Glasgow Warriors (Scotland) (1)	33–21	(8) (Ireland) Connacht	Scotstoun Stadium, Glasgow
19:45	Try: Schickerling 10' c Steyn (2) 44' c, 74' m MvKay 55' c Oguntibeju 68' c Con: Horne 10', 44', 55', 69'; Cards: Samuel (yellow card) 64'	Report	Try: Prendergast 4' c Heffernan 64' c Bealham 71' c Con: Gilbert 5', 65', 71'; Cards: Sam Illo (yellow card) 13'	Attendance: 7,321; Referee: Adam Jones (Wales)

Semi-final

The home win streak in URC play-off matches ended at eleven in the Murrayfield Stadium as top seeds Glasgow Warriors, despite an early 21 to 3 lead, succumbed to a comeback from three-time beaten finalists Bulls, who booked their fourth final in five for their fourth assault on the United Rugby Championship title.

6 June 2026	Glasgow Warriors (Scotland) (1)	21–22	(4) (South Africa) Bulls	Murrayfield Stadium, Edinburgh
14:30	Try: Steyn (2) 15' c, 19' c Penalty try 35'; Con: Lancaster (2/2) 16', 20'; Cards: Cummings (yellow card) 44'	Report; Highlights	Try: Grobbelaar 32' c Papier 45' m Klopper 53' c Con: Pollard (2/3) 32', 54'; Pen: Pollard 7'; Cards: Pollard (yellow card) 9'; Nortjé (yellow card) 25'	Attendance: 17,981; Referee: Andrew Brace (Ireland)

=== URC Scottish-Italian Shield ===
2025–26 United Rugby Championship Regional Shield tables
(Italy) (Scotland) Italian x Scottish Shield
	Team	P	W	D	L	PF	PA	PD	TF	TA	TBP	LBP	Pts	Pos overall
1	(Scotland) Glasgow Warriors	6	5	0	1	163	72	+91	25	9	4	1	25	1
2	(Scotland) Edinburgh	6	3	0	3	132	120	+12	20	17	3	1	16	12
3	(Italy) Benetton	6	3	0	3	98	141	–43	10	19	1	1	14	13
4	(Italy) Zebre Parma	6	1	0	5	130	190	–60	17	26	2	3	9	16
If teams are level at any stage, tiebreakers are applied in the following order: 1. number of matches won 2. the difference between points for and points against 3. the number of tries scored 4. the most points scored 5. the difference between tries for and tries against 6. the fewest red cards received 7. the fewest yellow cards received
Green background indicates teams currently leading the regional shield. Upon the conclusion of the regular season, these teams win their respective regional shields. (S) : URC Shield champion

=== European Champions Cup ===
Glasgow Warriors were drawn in Pool 1 along with South Africa's Sharks, English sides Sale Sharks and Saracens, French champions Toulouse and French side ASM Clermont Auvergne. As the South African side are in the same domestic league as the Warriors, they do not play each other in the group stage.

European Rugby Champions Cup Pool 1
Pos	Team	Pld	W	D	L	PF	PA	PD	TF	TA	TB	LB	Pts	Qualification
1	(Scotland) Glasgow Warriors (2)	4	4	0	0	115	66	+49	17	9	4	0	20	Home Champions Cup round of 16
2	(France) Toulouse (8)	4	2	0	2	168	74	+94	24	11	2	2	12	Home Champions Cup round of 16
3	(England) Sale Sharks (11)	4	2	0	2	89	127	−38	13	18	2	1	11	Away Champions Cup round of 16
4	(England) Saracens (13)	4	2	0	2	93	70	+23	13	14	1	1	10	Away Champions Cup round of 16
5	(South Africa) Sharks (9CC)	4	2	0	2	107	117	−10	16	17	2	0	10	Away Challenge Cup round of 16
6	(France) Clermont	4	0	0	4	57	165	−108	9	25	0	0	0	

Source: EPCR
Rules for classification: Tiebreakers for teams tied on points: 1) Number of matches won; 2) Difference between points for and against; 3) Total number of points for; 4) Aggregate number of points scored in matches between tied teams; 5) Number of matches won excluding the first match, then the second and so on until the tie is settled.

==== Pool 1 ====
5 December 2025	(1 BP) Sale Sharks (England)	21–26	(Scotland) Glasgow Warriors (1 BP)	Salford Community Stadium, Manchester
20:00	Try: Van Rhyn 2' c Davies 19' c Louw 65' c Con: Du Preez (3/3) 3', 19', 66'	Report	Try: Hiddleston 31' m Darge 39' c Steyn 42' c McDowall 54' c Con: Hastings (3/4) 40', 43', 55'	Attendance: 4,965; Referee: Pierre Brousset (France)

13 December 2025	(1 BP) Glasgow Warriors (Scotland)	28–21	(France) Toulouse (1 BP)	Scotstoun Stadium, Glasgow
20:00	Try: McKay 50' c Brown 58' c Tuipulotu 65' c Hiddleston 70' c Con: Hastings (4/4) 51', 59', 66', 71'	Report	Try: Dupont 7' c Gourgues (2) 11' c, 35' c Con: Ramos (3/3) 8', 12', 36'	Attendance: 7,321; Referee: Matthew Carley (England)

10 January 2026	Clermont (France)	21–33	(Scotland) Glasgow Warriors (1 BP)	Stade Marcel-Michelin, Clermont
16:15	Try: Moala 31' c Penalty try 51'; Simone 61' c Con: Plummer (2/2) 32', 62'; Cards: Sowakula (yellow card) 6'	Report	Try: Ferrie 9' m Jones 17' c Steyn (2) 23' c, 70' c Dempsey 34' c Con: Horne (4/5) 18', 24', 35', 71'; Cards: Schickerling (yellow card) 51'; Horne (yellow card) 51'	Attendance: 16,435; Referee: Luke Pearce (England)

18 January 2026	(1 BP) Glasgow Warriors (Scotland)	28–3	(England) Saracens	Scotstoun Stadium, Glasgow
17:30	Try: Smith 9' c Steyn 28' c Horne 30' c Stephen 80+2'; Con: Horne (3/3) 10', 28', 31'; Lancaster (1/1) 80+3'	Report	Pen: Farrell (1/1) 14'; Cards: González (yellow card) 21'; Caluori (yellow card) 75'	Attendance: 7,321; Referee: Luc Ramos (France)

==== Knockout stage ====
Glasgow qualified for a home tie in the round of 16 with their third victory from three in the pool stage. Their fourth victory, a bonus-point win against Saracens, guaranteed top spot in Pool 1, second seeding overall and both a home quarter-final and home nation semi-final should they progress that far.

Their round of sixteen match will be against fellow United Rugby Championship team, Bulls.

Round of 16
1	(France) Bordeaux Bègles	64
16	(England) Leicester Tigers	14
8	(France) Toulouse	59
9	(England) Bristol Bears	26
4	(England) Bath	31
13	(England) Saracens	22
5	(England) Northampton Saints	49
12	(France) Castres	41
2	(Scotland) Glasgow Warriors	25
15	(South Africa) Bulls	21
7	(France) Toulon	28
10	(South Africa) Stormers	27
3	(Ireland) Leinster	49
14	(Scotland) Edinburgh	31
6	(England) Harlequins	17
11	(England) Sale Sharks	26

Quarter-finals
1	(France) Bordeaux Bègles	30
8	(France) Toulouse	15
4	(England) Bath	43
5	(England) Northampton Saints	41
2	(Scotland) Glasgow Warriors	19
7	(France) Toulon	22
3	(Ireland) Leinster	43
11	(England) Sale Sharks	13

Semi-finals
1	(France) Bordeaux Bègles	38
4	(England) Bath	26
3	(Ireland) Leinster	29
7	(France) Toulon	25

Final
1	(France) Bordeaux Bègles	41
3	(Ireland) Leinster	19

Round of 16

4 April 2026	Glasgow Warriors (Scotland) (2)	25–21	(15) (South Africa) Bulls	Scotstoun Stadium, Glasgow
17:30	Try: Williamson 17' c Dempsey 33' m Schickerling 56' m McDowall 71' m Con: Lancaster (1/4) 18'; Pen: Hastings (1/1) 80'	Report	Try: Grobbelaar 25' m Van Staden 76' c Con: Pollard (0/1); Kriel (1/1) 77'; Pen: Pollard (3/3) 12', 31', 39'; Cards: Louw (yellow card) 79'	Attendance: 7,321; Referee: Pierre Brousset (France)

Quarter-final

11 April 2026	Glasgow Warriors (Scotland) (2)	19–22	(7) (France) Toulon	Scotstoun Stadium, Glasgow
15:00	Try: McDowall 9' c Smith 22' m Hiddleston 44' c Con: Lancaster (1/2) 10'; Hastings (1/1) 46'	Report	Try: Dréan (2) 13' m, 36' m Gros 28' c Brex 58' m Con: Jaminet (1/4) 29'; Cards: Kpoku (yellow card) 20'	Attendance: 7,321; Referee: Karl Dickson (England)

== Awards ==
=== Warrior of the Month ===
Month	Winner
September	(Scotland) Jare Oguntibeju
October	(Scotland) Ollie Smith
December	(Scotland) Jamie Dobie
January	(Scotland) Jack Dempsey
March	(Scotland) Alex Samuel
April	(Namibia) Patrick Schickerling
May	(Scotland) Kyle Steyn

=== End of season ===
Award	Winner
Breakthrough Player of the Season	(Scotland) Seb Stephen
Coaches Award	(Scotland) Stafford McDowall
Test Player of the Season	(Scotland) Kyle Steyn
Most Improved Player of the Season	(Namibia) Patrick Schickerling
Leadership Award	(Scotland) Rory Darge
Community Hero of the Year	Ali Anderson (Hamilton RFC)
Try of the Season	(Scotland) Kyle Rowe vs. (Ireland) Leinster
Players' Player of the Season	(Scotland) Stafford McDowall
Player of the Season	(Scotland) George Horne
