= 2025–26 Scottish Rugby Academy season =

Scottish Rugby Academy 2024 / 2025

The Scottish Rugby Academy provides Scotland's up-and-coming rugby union players a dedicated, focused routeway for development into the professional game. Entry is restricted to Scottish qualified students and both male and female entrants are accepted into four regional academies. The 2025–26 season sees the eleventh year of the academy.

== Season overview ==
This was the eleventh year of the Scottish Rugby Academy. With the closure of the Super 6 league, the academy numbers for both Glasgow Warriors and Edinburgh Rugby have been increased to help mitigate the young players development.

== Regional Academies ==
The Scottish Rugby Academy runs four regional academies in Scotland:- Glasgow and the West, Borders and East Lothian, Edinburgh and Caledonia. These roughly correspond to the traditional districts of Glasgow District, South, Edinburgh District and North and Midlands.

== Stages ==
Players are selected in three stages:-

=== Supported stages ===
- Stage 1 – Regionally selected and regionally supported players
- Stage 2 – Nationally selected and regionally supported players

=== Contracted stage ===
- Stage 3 – Nationally selected and regionally supported players assigned to a professional team.

== Academy Players ==
=== Stage 3 players ===
Stage 3 players are assigned to a professional team. Nominally, for the men, Glasgow Warriors receive the Stage 3 players of Glasgow and the West and Caledonia regions, while Edinburgh Rugby receive the Stage 3 players of the Edinburgh and Borders and East Lothian regions. The women are integrated into the Scotland women's national rugby sevens team and the Scotland women's national rugby union team.

The Stage 3 players were assigned directly to Glasgow Warriors and Edinburgh Rugby.

==== Glasgow Warriors ====
Note: Flags indicate national union under World Rugby eligibility rules. Players may hold more than one non-World Rugby nationality.

Player	Position	Union
Oliver McKenna	Prop	Scotland
Jackson Rennie	Prop	Scotland
Jake Shearer	Prop	Scotland
Joe Roberts	Hooker	Scotland
Seb Stephen	Hooker	Scotland
Ryan Burke	Lock	Scotland
Dan Halkon	Lock	Scotland
Dylan Cockburn	Flanker	Scotland
Macenzzie Duncan	Flanker	Scotland
Archie McMichael	Flanker	Scotland
Jonny Morris	Flanker	Scotland
Rory Purvis	Flanker	Scotland

Player	Position	Union
Brent Jackson	Scrum-half	Scotland
Jack Oliver	Scrum-half	Scotland
Matthew Urwin	Fly-half	Scotland
Alex Brydon	Centre	Scotland
Kerr Johnston	Centre	Scotland
Ben Salmon	Centre	Scotland
Johnny Ventisei	Centre	Scotland
Kerr Yule	Centre	Scotland
Cameron Van Wyk	Wing	Scotland
Harry Provan	Wing	Scotland
Fergus Watson	Fullback	Scotland

==== Edinburgh ====
Note: Flags indicate national union under World Rugby eligibility rules. Players may hold more than one non-World Rugby nationality.

Player	Position	Union
Jamie Stuart	Prop	Scotland
Ben White	Prop	Scotland
Jerry Blyth-Lafferty	Hooker	Scotland
Jack Utterson	Hooker	Scotland
Sam Byrd	Lock	Scotland
Euan McVie	Lock	Scotland
Mak Rutherford	Lock	Scotland
Christian Lindsay	Flanker	Scotland
Ollie Duncan	Number 8	Scotland

Player	Position	Union
Hamish McArthur	Scrum-half	Scotland
Hector Patterson	Scrum-half	Scotland
Isaac Coates	Fly-half	Scotland
Henry Widdowson	Fly-half	Scotland
Henry Kesterton	Centre	Scotland
Sam Leweni	Centre	Scotland
Findlay Thomson	Centre	Scotland
Ross Wolfenden	Centre	Scotland
Finlay Doyle	Wing	Scotland
Ross McKnight	Wing	Scotland
Nairn Moncrieff	Wing	Scotland
Lewis Wells	Wing	Scotland
Rory McHaffie	Fullback	Scotland

== Graduates of this year ==
Players who have signed professional contracts with clubs:

- (Scotland) Jack Oliver (Glasgow Warriors)
