= 2023–24 Scottish Rugby Academy season =

Scottish Rugby Academy 2023 / 2024

The Scottish Rugby Academy provides Scotland's up and coming rugby stars a dedicated focused routeway for development into the professional game. Entry is restricted to Scottish qualified students and both male and female entrants are accepted into 4 regional academies. The 2023–24 season sees the ninth year of the academy, now sponsored by Fosroc.

== Season overview ==
This was the ninth year of the Scottish Rugby Academy.

== Regional Academies ==
The Scottish Rugby Academy runs four regional academies in Scotland:- Glasgow and the West, Borders and East Lothian, Edinburgh and Caledonia. These roughly correspond to the traditional districts of Glasgow District, South, Edinburgh District and North and Midlands.

== Stages ==
Players are selected in three stages:-

=== Supported stages ===
- Stage 1 - Regionally selected and regionally supported players
- Stage 2 - Nationally selected and regionally supported players

=== Contracted stage ===
- Stage 3 - Nationally selected and regionally supported players assigned to a professional team.

== Academy Players ==
=== Stage 3 players ===
Stage 3 players are assigned to a professional team. Nominally, for the men, Glasgow Warriors receive the Stage 3 players of Glasgow and the West and Caledonia regions, while Edinburgh Rugby receive the Stage 3 players of the Edinburgh and Borders and East Lothian regions. The women are integrated into the Scotland women's national rugby sevens team and the Scotland women's national rugby union team.

The Stage 3 players were assigned directly to Glasgow Warriors and Edinburgh Rugby.

However they were also eligible for the Super 6 FOSROC Futures XV side when not in use by the United Rugby Championship sides.

==== Glasgow Warriors ====
Note: Flags indicate national union under World Rugby eligibility rules. Players may hold more than one non-World Rugby nationality.

Player	Position	Union
Tom Banatvala	Prop	Scotland
Callum Norrie	Prop	Scotland
Callum Smyth	Prop	Scotland
Ryan Burke	Lock	Scotland
Harris McLeod	Lock	Scotland
Ruaraidh Hart	Flanker	Scotland
Jonny Morris	Flanker	Scotland

Player	Position	Union
Matthew Urwin	Fly-half	Scotland
Ben Salmon	Centre	Scotland
Johnny Ventisei	Centre	Scotland
Kerr Yule	Centre	Scotland
Amena Caqusau	Wing	Scotland
Logan Jarvie	Wing	Scotland
Kerr Johnston	Wing	Scotland
Fergus Watson	Wing	Scotland

==== Edinburgh ====
Note: Flags indicate national union under World Rugby eligibility rules. Players may hold more than one non-World Rugby nationality.

Player	Position	Union
Jerry Blyth-Lafferty	Hooker	Scotland
Harri Morris	Hooker	Scotland
Robbie Deans	Prop	Scotland
Ollie Blyth-Lafferty	Prop	Scotland
Euan McVie	Lock	Scotland
Tom Currie	Flanker	Scotland
Freddy Douglas	Flanker	Scotland
Liam McConnell	Flanker	Scotland
Ollie Duncan	Number 8	Scotland

Player	Position	Union
Finlay Burgess	Scrum-half	Scotland
Hector Patterson	Scrum-half	Scotland
Isaac Coates	Fly-half	Scotland
Jack Hocking	Centre	Scotland
Finn Douglas	Wing	Scotland
Jack Brown	Fullback	Scotland

== Graduates of this year ==
Players who have signed professional contracts with clubs:

None as yet.
