= Mosese Tuipulotu =

Australian rugby union player

- Born: 5 May 2001 (age 25) Melbourne, Australia
- Height: 182 cm (6 ft 0 in)
- Weight: 102 kg (225 lb; 16 st 1 lb)
- School: St Kevin's College
- Notable relative(s): Sione Tuipulotu brother Tavi Tuipulotu, brother

Rugby union career
- Position: Centre
Senior career
Years	Team	Apps	(Points)
2022–24	Waratahs	5	(0)
2024–	Edinburgh	24	(25)
- Correct as of 24 November 2024
International career
Years	Team	Apps	(Points)
2024–	Scotland A	1	(0)
- Correct as of 24 November 2024

Mosese Tuipulotu (born 5 May 2001) is an Australian born Scottish rugby union player, currently playing for Edinburgh Rugby. He previously played for the Waratahs. His preferred position is centre.

== Early career ==
Tuipulotu was born in Melbourne, Australia and is the brother of Scotland international Sione Tuipulotu. Like his brother, he is also eligible for Tonga via his father and for Scotland via his grandmother.

== Club career ==
Tuipulotu played his junior rugby in Victoria, playing in the Dewar Shield. He moved to New South Wales in 2021, representing the Eastern Suburbs team. He was first named in the Waratahs squad for the 2022 season, although did not feature due to injury. He was again named in the squad for 2023, and made his debut in Round 4 of the 2023 Super Rugby Pacific season against the Hurricanes. In the same week, he was heavily linked to a move to Scotland.

In May 2024, it was announced that Tuipulotu had signed a two-year contract with United Rugby Championship team Edinburgh.

== International career ==
In October 2024, Tuipolotu was named in the Scotland squad for the autumn nations series alongside his brother who was also named as captain. He played for Scotland A against Chile in Nov 2024.
