= Harri Morris =

Scottish rugby union player

- Born: 13 October 2001 (age 25)
- Height: 180 cm (5 ft 11 in)
- Weight: 104 kg (229 lb)
- School: George Watson’s College

Rugby union career
- Position: Hooker
- Current team: Edinburgh Rugby
Amateur team(s)
Years	Team	Apps	(Points)
- Southport
–	Melrose RFC		
Senior career
Years	Team	Apps	(Points)
2021–	Edinburgh Rugby	5	(5)
2022	→ London Scottish	9	(5)
2023	→ Doncaster Knights	5	(10)
International career
Years	Team	Apps	(Points)
2021	Scotland U20	1	(0)
2024–	Scotland A	2	(0)
2024	Emerging Scotland	1	(0)
2025-	Scotland	1	(0)

Harri Morris is a Scotland international rugby union player who currently plays for Edinburgh Rugby in the United Rugby Championship.

== Rugby Union career ==
=== Amateur career ===
Morris began playing rugby with Southport RFC in England, before moving to Scotland aged 12.

=== Professional career ===
Morris was announced in Edinburgh's squad ahead of their Round 4 Pro14 Rainbow Cup match against Ulster. He made his Pro14 debut in the same match, coming on as a replacement.

In the summer of 2023 he went on a season long loan to Doncaster Knights.

=== International career ===
He played for Emerging Scotland in their first match on 14 December 2024.

He played for Scotland in the Autumn Nation Series in 2025.

He played for Scotland 'A' on 6 February 2026 in their match against Italy XV.
