= Callum Reidy =

Scottish rugby union player

- Born: 2 March 2005 (age 21) Aberdeen, Scotland
- Height: 1.88 m (6 ft 2 in)
- Weight: 90 kg (14 st 2 lb)

Rugby union career
- Position: Scrum half
Amateur team(s)
Years	Team	Apps	(Points)
-	Norths Eagles		
2025-26	Glasgow Hawks	15	(0)
Senior career
Years	Team	Apps	(Points)
2026-	Glasgow Warriors	3	(0)

Callum Reidy (born 2 March 2005) is a Scottish rugby union player. He plays for Glasgow Warriors. He has also played for the amateur side Glasgow Hawks in the Scottish Premiership.

== Rugby Union career ==
=== Amateur career ===
Born in Aberdeen, Reidy and his family moved to Australia. Reidy played rugby union for the Brisbane club Norths in their Eagles side. Moving back to Scotland he turned out for Glasgow Hawks. He won Player's Player of the Season for the Glasgow club.

=== Professional career ===
He entered the Glasgow Warriors academy in 2026-27 season, after providing cover for the club during the 2026 Six Nations international window and joining their European squad.

Reidy played in Glasgow Warriors two pre-season matches of 26/27 season, starting the match against Bath.

Reidy was on the bench for two URC matches against Munster and Ulster but not used. Initially not selected for the Warriors versus Connacht match when Kyle Rowe fell sick, Reidy made the bench again. Finally Reidy made his competitive debut for the Warriors in a 26 - 19 bonus point win for the Glasgow club. Reidy became Glasgow Warrior No. 379.
