= Ollie Smith (rugby union, born 2000) =

Scottish rugby union player (born 2002)

- Born: Oliver James Smith; 7 August 2000 (age 26) Prestwick, South Ayrshire, Scotland
- Height: 1.88 m (6 ft 2 in)
- Weight: 98 kg (216 lb; 15 st 6 lb)
- School: Strathallan School

Rugby union career
- Position: Fullback / Centre
Amateur team(s)
Years	Team	Apps	(Points)
- Marr
–	Ayr		
Senior career
Years	Team	Apps	(Points)
2021–	Glasgow Warriors	54	(40)
International career
Years	Team	Apps	(Points)
2019–2020	Scotland U20	13	(15)
2022-	Scotland 'A'	2	(0)
2022-	Scotland	15	(15)
2024	Emerging Scotland	1	(0)

Ollie Smith (born 7 August 2000) is a Scotland international rugby union player for Glasgow Warriors in the United Rugby Championship. Smith's primary position is full back but can also play at centre.

== Rugby Union career ==
=== Amateur career ===
Smith first played youth rugby with Marr. He then moved to play for Ayr.

Smith was a member of the winning Strathallan School team that won the 2017-18 Scottish Rugby Schools' Cup 52–8 against Glenalmond College at Murrayfield.

=== Professional career ===
He played for the Ayrshire Bulls in the Super 6 in 2019–20 season.

Smith was named as a member of the Glasgow Warriors academy for the 2020–21 season. He made his debut for Glasgow Warriors in the re-arranged Round 9 of the 2020–21 Pro14 against Edinburgh. He is Warrior No. 321.

On 24 February 2021 it was announced that Smith had graduated from the academy to sign with Glasgow Warriors.

He won Warrior of the Month in May 2022 and Young Player of the Season in 2021-22. He won Warrior of the Month again in October 2025.

=== International career ===
In February 2022 Smith was called up to the Scotland squad for the 2022 Six Nations Championship. He received his first full international cap for Scotland in the 3rd test against Argentina in Santiago del Estero on 16 July 2022. He scored his first international try against Australia on 29 October 2022 at Murrayfield Stadium.

In 2023 Smith was selected in Scotland's 33 player squad for the 2023 Rugby World Cup in France.

On his comeback from injury he played for Emerging Scotland in their first match on 14 December 2024.

He was capped by Scotland 'A' on 25 June 2022 in their match against Chile. He played for Scotland 'A' on 6 February 2026 in their match against Italy XV.

==== List of international tries ====
Try	Opposing team	Venue	Competition	Date	Score
1	Australia	Murrayfield Stadium, Edinburgh	2022 Autumn Internationals	29 October 2022	15 - 16
2	Romania	Stade Pierre-Mauroy, Lille	2023 Rugby World Cup	30 September 2023	84 - 0
3	United States	Murrayfield Stadium, Edinburgh	2025 Autumn Internationals	1 November 2025	85 - 0
