= Gregor Hiddleston =

Scottish rugby union player (born 2002)

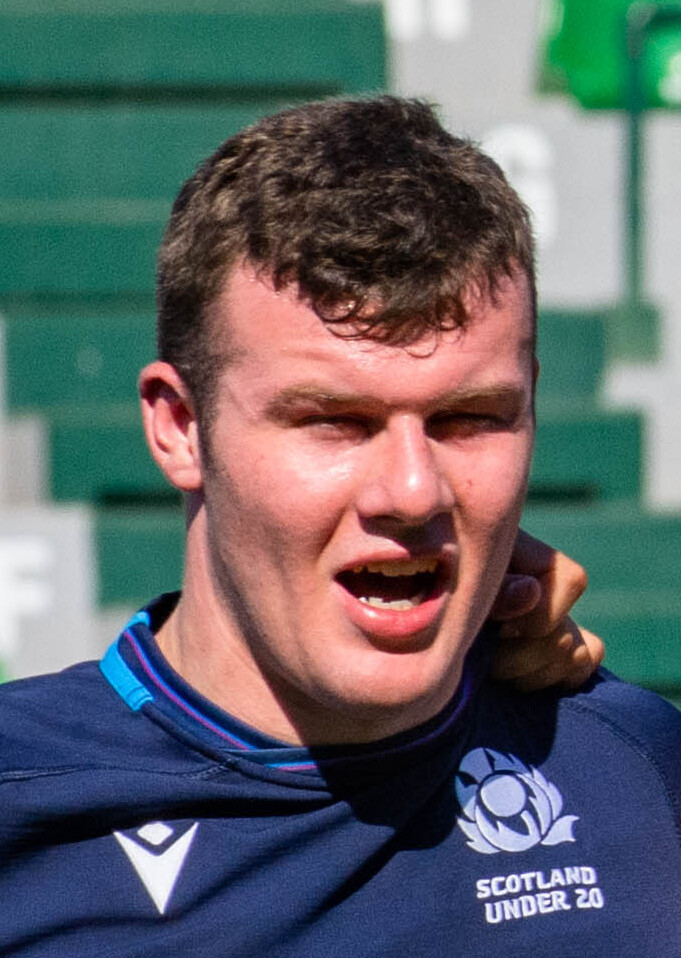
- Hiddleston in 2022
- Born: Gregor Hiddleston; 26 March 2002 (age 24) Dumfries, Scotland
- Height: 6 ft 2 in (1.88 m)
- Weight: 106 kg (234 lb; 16 st 10 lb)
- School: Wallace Hall Academy

Rugby union career
- Position: Hooker
Amateur team(s)
Years	Team	Apps	(Points)
2009–21	Dumfries Saints		
2021–22	Glasgow Hutchesons Aloysians		
Senior career
Years	Team	Apps	(Points)
2022–	Glasgow Warriors	43	(40)
- Correct as of 18 November 2026
Super Rugby
Years	Team	Apps	(Points)
2022–	Stirling Wolves		
International career
Years	Team	Apps	(Points)
2022	Scotland U20	6	
2024-	Scotland 'A'	2	(5)
2026-	Scotland	3	(5)
- Correct as of 18 November 2026

Gregor Hiddleston (born 26 March 2002) is a Scotland international rugby union player who plays for Glasgow Warriors at the Hooker position.

== Rugby Union career ==
=== Amateur career ===
He played with Dumfries Saints, before joining Glasgow Hutchesons Aloysians.

=== Professional career ===
Hiddleston joined Glasgow Warriors in 2022, on a partnership deal with Stirling Wolves. This allowed him to play for Stirling Wolves when not in use for Glasgow.

He played for Stirling Wolves from 2022.

He played for Glasgow Warriors 'A' side in 2023 against Boroughmuir Bears and against Edinburgh 'A' side. He made his competitive debut for the Warriors in their European Champions Cup match against Exeter Chiefs on 13 January 2024.

On 12 February 2024, Glasgow replaced his partnership contract with a full time contract with the club.

=== International career ===
Hiddleston got his debut for the Scotland U20s in February 2022.

He was capped in the Scotland 'A' international match against Chile on 23 November 2024. He scored a try for the 'A' side in their match against Italy XV on 6 February 2026.

He made his senior debut in the 47-38 win away to Argentina in the 2026 Nations Championship. He scored a try in the match.
