= Max Williamson =

Scottish rugby union player (born 2002)

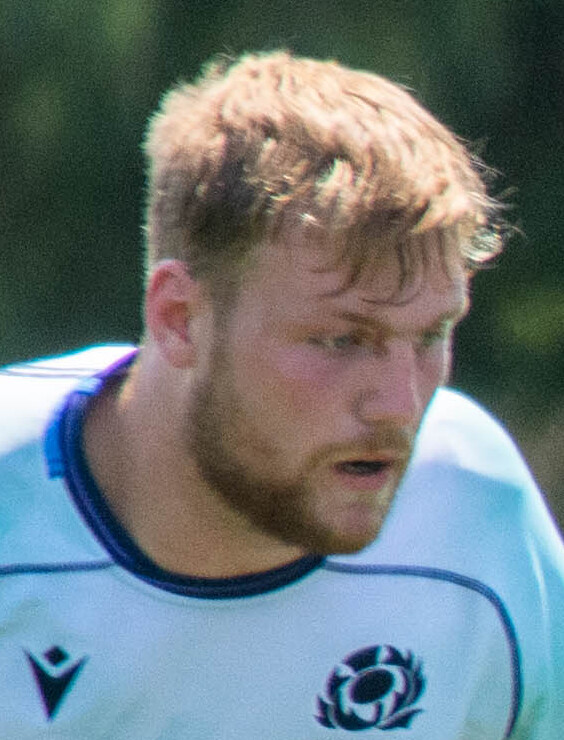
- Williamson in 2022
- Born: Max Williamson; 5 August 2002 (age 24) Glasgow, Scotland
- Height: 6 ft 7 in (2.01 m)
- Weight: 123 kg (271 lb; 19 st 5 lb)
- School: Dollar Academy

Rugby union career
- Position: Lock
Amateur team(s)
Years	Team	Apps	(Points)
2007–2015	Stirling County		
Senior career
Years	Team	Apps	(Points)
2020–	Glasgow Warriors	36	(10)
2022	→ London Scottish	0	(0)
2023	→ Doncaster Knights	4	(0)
Super Rugby
Years	Team	Apps	(Points)
2021–22	Stirling Wolves		
International career
Years	Team	Apps	(Points)
- Scotland U16
2018	Scotland U17		
2020–22	Scotland U20	14	(0)
2024–	Scotland	18	(5)
- Correct as of 18 November 2026

Max Williamson (born 5 August 2002) is a Scotland international rugby union player who plays for Glasgow Warriors at the Lock position.

== Rugby Union career ==
=== Amateur career ===
He played with Stirling County from the age of 4, before joining the Dollar Academy set-up.

=== Professional career ===
Williamson joined Glasgow Warriors in 2020, initially with the Scottish Rugby Academy, before graduating from the academy with a permanent deal with the Glasgow club in 2022.

He made his debut for Glasgow Warriors in a 'A' match against Edinburgh Rugby on 4 February 2021 at a closed doors match at Scotstoun Stadium. Following this he played in the pre-season match against Newcastle Falcons on 3 September 2021 replacing Lewis Bean in the second half.

Williamson played for the Stirling Wolves in 2021 and 2022.

With a permanent deal at the Glasgow club, he was loaned out to London Scottish, and then Doncaster Knights before returning for the season end, where he made a string of appearances for Glasgow Warriors 'A' side against the Super 6 sides Ayrshire Bulls, Boroughmuir Bears and Stirling Wolves in the 2022–23 season.

He then made his competitive debut for the Warriors against Benetton Rugby on 18 November 2023 in the United Rugby Championship in a bonus point win which took the Warriors joint-top of the URC league. He became Glasgow Warrior No. 355.

He scored his first try for the club against Cardiff Rugby in a 17 - 13 win for the Scotstoun side.

=== International career ===
Williamson came through the age grades for Scotland playing at Under 16 and Under 17s.

Williamson played for the Scotland U20 side from 2020 to 2022.

He was asked to train with the Scotland senior squad in 2021. In June 2024 Williamson was called up to the senior Scotland squad for a tour of The Americas.

He made his Scotland debut against Canada on 6 July 2024 at TD Place Stadium in Ottawa. Scotland won the match 73 points to 12. Williamson has the Scotland no. 1220.

== Outside of rugby ==
Williamson is studying mathematics at the University of Strathclyde.
