= Tavi Tuipulotu =

Australian rugby union player (born 2004)

- Born: Ottavio Tuipulotu; 7 March 2004 (age 22) Melbourne, Australia
- Height: 1.80 m (5 ft 11 in)
- Weight: 110 kg (243 lb; 17 st 5 lb)
- School: St. Kevin's College
- Notable relative(s): Sione Tuipulotu, brother Mosese Tuipulotu, brother

Rugby union career
- Position: Hooker
Senior career
Years	Team	Apps	(Points)
2023–24	Melbourne Rebels	0	(0)
2024–25	Waratahs	0	(0)
2025–	Glasgow Warriors	1	(5)
International career
Years	Team	Apps	(Points)
2023–24	Australia U20	8	(5)

Tavi Tuipulotu (born 7 March 2004) is an Australian rugby union player who plays as a hooker for United Rugby Championship club Glasgow Warriors.

He is the brother of Scotland captain Sione Tuipulotu and Scotland 'A' cap Mosese Tuipulotu. He has played for the Australia under-20 side and also qualifies for Scotland through his grandmother.

== Club career ==
=== Amateur career ===
Tuipulotu captained his school XV at St. Kevin's College in Melbourne. He had two reconstructive knee surgeries before his 18th birthday.

=== Professional career ===
Tuipulotu joined the Melbourne Rebels academy system on a development contract in November 2023. He played in their Under 19 and Under 20 teams. The Rebels had their licence revoked to play Super Rugby after the 2024 season, so Tuipulotu had to look elsewhere.

In late 2024 he moved to train with the New South Wales Waratahs. There was stiff competition at hooker there and he did not play a competitive match for the club, nor offered a contract.

Tuipulotu was signed by Glasgow Warriors for season 2025-26. Unfortunately an injury kept him out of contention for the whole of the season. He was fit for the 2026-27 season and he started both pre-season matches against Newcastle Red Bulls and Bath Rugby. He made his competitive debut for the Warriors in the European Champions Cup match against Sale Sharks, coming off the bench and scoring a try on debut on 17 October 2026. He became Glasgow Warrior No. 381.

== International career ==
Tuipulotu played for Australia Under 20s in the season 2023–24. He played 8 matches, starting 6 of them. He scored a try in the second round of the Under 20 Championship against Italy Under 20s.
