= Patrick Schickerling =

Namibian rugby union player (born 1998)

- Full name: Patrick Schickerling
- Born: 16 October 1998 (age 28) Walvis Bay, Namibia
- Height: 182 cm (6 ft 0 in)
- Weight: 124 kg (273 lb; 19 st 7 lb)
- School: Walvis Bay Private High School

Rugby union career
- Position: Tight-head Prop
- Current team: Glasgow Warriors
Youth career
- 2018: Pumas
Senior career
Years	Team	Apps	(Points)
2018–2024	Exeter Chiefs	38	(35)
2019	→ Chinnor (loan)	7	(5)
2019	→ Guernsey (loan)	2	(10)
2020–2022	→ Cornish Pirates (loan)	9	(15)
2024–	Glasgow Warriors	8	(10)
- Correct as of 6 April 2025
International career
Years	Team	Apps	(Points)
2016	Namibia U18s	??	(??)
2017–2019	Namibia U20s	8	(15)
2022	England XV	1	(0)
- Correct as of 6 April 2025

Patrick Schickerling (born 16 October 1998) is a Namibian professional rugby union player who plays as a prop for United Rugby Championship club Glasgow Warriors.

== Club career ==
Schickerling featured for the Pumas in the Currie Cup. He was scouted by Exeter Chiefs after the 2018 World Rugby U20 Trophy. In February 2020 he made his club debut coming off the bench during a 2019–20 Premiership Rugby Cup semi-final defeat against Harlequins.

Schickerling spent time on loan at Chinnor and Guernsey, as well as at Championship side Cornish Pirates where impressive performances saw him get recalled to Exeter. In March 2023 he started for the Chiefs side that defeated London Irish to win the Premiership Rugby Cup.

Schickerling joined Glasgow Warriors for the 2024–25 United Rugby Championship.

== International career ==
Schickerling played for Namibia under-18 at the 2016 Craven schools week. He featured in two World Rugby U20 Trophy competitions featuring 8 times scoring 3 tries.

In June 2022 Schickerling was called up to the senior England squad by coach Eddie Jones for an uncapped match against the Barbarians at Twickenham. He came off the bench in the 21–52 loss. He was included in the squad for their 2022 tour of Australia however did not feature in any of the Test series.

It was later revealed Schickerling was ineligible to represent England having not completed the required residency period. While living in the country World Rugby revised the rule from three to five years resulting in Schickerling not qualifying until November 2023.
