= Josh McKay (rugby union) =

New Zealand rugby union player (born 1997)

- Full name: Joshua Alexander McKay
- Born: 10 October 1997 (age 29) Christchurch, New Zealand
- Height: 184 cm (6 ft 0 in)
- Weight: 95 kg (209 lb; 14 st 13 lb)
- School: Christchurch Boys' High School
- University: Lincoln University

Rugby union career
- Position(s): Wing, Fullback
Senior career
Years	Team	Apps	(Points)
2017–21	Canterbury	50	(110)
2018–20	Highlanders	15	(20)
2021	Crusaders	2	(0)
2021-	Glasgow Warriors	82	(105)
International career
Years	Team	Apps	(Points)
2016–17	New Zealand U20	4	(10)

Joshua Alexander McKay (born 10 October 1997) is a New Zealand rugby union player. He plays for Glasgow Warriors in the United Rugby Championship. His playing position is wing or fullback.

== Rugby Union career ==
=== Professional career ===
McKay represented the Highlanders for three seasons, before joining the Crusaders ahead of the 2021 Super Rugby Aotearoa season.

McKay played for the Crusaders in the Super Rugby competition and Canterbury in the Mitre 10 Cup in 2021.

In February 2021, McKay was announced as joining the Glasgow Warriors in Scotland ahead of the 2021–22 season. McKay said of the move:

I like attacking with the ball in hand, I’m a balanced rugby player and I think I can make an impact on both attack and defence. I really think the style of Glasgow’s play will suit me. I’ve watched Glasgow Warriors games on TV and I’m very excited for my first taste of northern hemisphere footy. I can’t wait to run out at Scotstoun in a Warriors jersey for the first time.

McKay made his competitive debut for the Warriors on 4 December 2021 in a match against the Dragons at Scotstoun Stadium. He became Glasgow Warrior No. 338. The Glasgow side won the match in a bonus point victory.

He won Glasgow Warriors try of the season for 2021-22. He won the Glasgow Warriors Player of the Season award for 2023-24.

=== International career ===
He has represented the New Zealand U20 in season 2016-17.

After completing the 5 year residency requirement, McKay was called into the Scotland international set-up for the Nations Championship matches.
