= Rory Darge =

Scottish rugby union player (born 2000)

- Full name: Rory Neil Benjamin Darge
- Born: 23 February 2000 (age 26) Edinburgh, Scotland
- Height: 1.86 m (6 ft 1 in)
- Weight: 102 kg (225 lb; 16 st 1 lb)
- School: North Berwick High School

Rugby union career
- Position(s): Flanker, Number 8
- Current team: Glasgow Warriors
Senior career
Years	Team	Apps	(Points)
2019–2020	Southern Knights	13	(0)
2020	Edinburgh	1	(0)
2021–	Glasgow Warriors	85	(65)
- Correct as of 24 October 2026
International career
Years	Team	Apps	(Points)
2018–2020	Scotland U20	13	(0)
2022–	Scotland	43	(35)
- Correct as of 15 November 2026

Rory Neil Benjamin Darge (born 23 February 2000) is a Scottish professional rugby union player who plays as a flanker for United Rugby Championship club Glasgow Warriors and captains the Scotland national team.

== Club career ==
Darge was part of the Edinburgh academy, before signing his first professional contract in July 2019 for Super 6 side Southern Knights where he won Southern Knights youth player of the year in his first season.

At the start of the 2020-21 season he signed for Edinburgh Rugby. He made his debut for Edinburgh in Round 6 of the 2020–21 URC against Leinster.

On 16 April 2021 it was announced that he would move to Glasgow Warriors ahead of the new URC season and that he had signed ahead of the 2021-22 season.

== International career ==
Darge was called up to the Scotland squad for the 2021 Summer internationals.

He made his debut for Scotland in the Six Nations match against Wales on 12 February 2022. Darge was selected in the 33-player squad for the 2023 Rugby World Cup in France. Darge was named as the Scotland co-captain for the 2024 Six Nations Championship.

== Career statistics ==
=== List of international tries ===
No.	Date	Venue	Opponent	Score	Result	Competition
1	26 February 2022	Murrayfield Stadium, Edinburgh, Scotland	France	8–15	17–36	2022 Six Nations Championship
2	12 August 2023	Stade Geoffroy-Guichard, Saint-Étienne, France	France	20–27	27–30	2023 Rugby World Cup warm-up matches
3	26 August 2023	Murrayfield Stadium, Edinburgh, Scotland	Georgia	12–6	33–6	2023 Rugby World Cup warm-up matches
4	24 September 2023	Stade de Nice, Nice, France	Tonga	22–10	45–17	2023 Rugby World Cup
5	30 September 2023	Stade Pierre-Mauroy, Lille, France	Romania	75–0	84–0	2023 Rugby World Cup
6	1 February 2025	Murrayfield Stadium, Edinburgh, Scotland	Italy	5–0	31–19	2025 Six Nations Championship
7	14 March 2026	Aviva Stadium, Dublin, Ireland	Ireland	19-26	43-21	2026 Six Nations Championship

as of 6 July 2026

Awards and achievements
Previous: Scott Cummings	Sir Willie Purves Quaich; 2022	Next: Luke Crosbie
