= Sam Talakai =

Australian rugby player (born 1991)

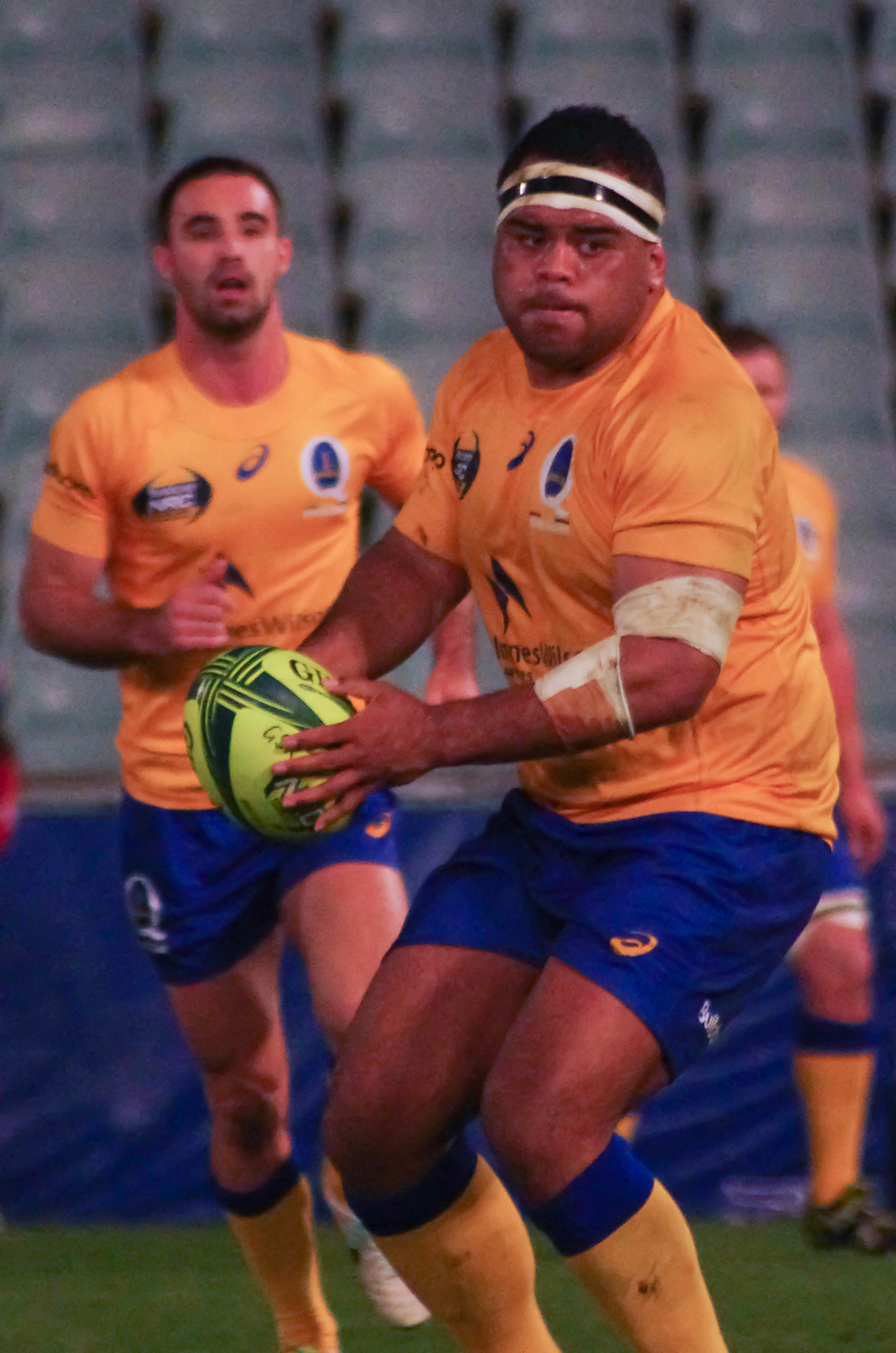
- Talakai in 2014
- Born: Semise Talakai; 4 September 1991 (age 35) Sydney, Australia
- Height: 1.83 m (6 ft 0 in)
- Weight: 122 kg (19 st 3 lb)
- School: Waverley College
- Notable relative(s): Chris Talakai (brother), Adiana Talakai (sister)

Rugby union career
- Position: Tighthead Prop
Senior career
Years	Team	Apps	(Points)
2010–	Sydney University	38	(20)
2014–2017	Brisbane City	21	(5)
2015	GPS		
2016	Brothers		
2018–2022	Suntory Sungoliath	25	(5)
2024-	Glasgow Warriors	2	(0)
Super Rugby
Years	Team	Apps	(Points)
2013	Waratahs	0	(0)
2015−17	Reds	40	(0)
2018–19	Rebels	31	(0)
2023–24	Rebels	14	(5)
- Correct as of 3 June 2023
International career
Years	Team	Apps	(Points)
2022	Australia	1	(0)
- Correct as of 27 November 2022

Sam Talakai (born 4 September 1991), is an Australian rugby union player of Tongan descent. His usual position is tighthead prop. He plays for Glasgow Warriors and Australia. He formerly played for Brisbane City in the National Rugby Championship, the Melbourne Rebels in Super Rugby

== Family and early life ==
Talakai was born in Australia. He attended Waverley College where he played rugby for the 1st XV team. He has a younger brother named Kaiasi Talakai also playing for Waverley College.

== Career ==
Talakai joined the Sydney University club in 2010, and by 2012 was a regular starter in their first grade Shute Shield team. In 2012 he was selected in the Junior Waratahs side to play in the Pacific Rugby Cup, and in 2013 he made his debut off the bench for the Waratahs against the British and Irish Lions. In 2014 he was recruited by Brisbane City coach Nick Stiles to play in the National Rugby Championship.

He joined Glasgow Warriors on 21 August 2024. He made his competitive debut on 21 September 2024 against Ulster Rugby for the Glasgow side, becoming Glasgow Warrior No. 361.

=== International ===
On 26 November 2022, Talakai was substituted onto the field in place of Allan Alaalatoa in the 71st minute of the Wallabies game against Wales, marking his debut in which the Wallabies won 39 to 34.

== Super Rugby statistics ==
As of 3 June 2023

Season	Team	Games	Starts	Sub	Mins	Tries	Cons	Pens	Drops	Points	Yel	Red
2015	Reds	13	6	7	471	0	0	0	0	0	0	0
2016	Reds	13	1	12	237	0	0	0	0	0	2	0
2017	Reds	14	12	2	692	0	0	0	0	0	0	0
2018	Rebels	16	7	9	605	0	0	0	0	0	0	0
2019	Rebels	15	8	7	629	0	0	0	0	0	1	0
2023	Rebels	14	12	2	750	1	0	0	0	5	0	0
Total		85	46	39	3,384	1	0	0	0	5	3	0
