= Emerging Scotland =

- Union: Scottish Rugby Union
- Emblem: The Thistle
- Founded: 2024
- Location: Scotland
- Coach: Gregor Townsend
- Captain: Liam McConnell
- Top scorer: Ollie Blyth-Laffery (5pts)
- Most tries: Ollie Blyth-Laffery (1 try)
Team kit	Change kit

First international
- Emerging Scotland 7 – 24 Italy U23 (2024)

Largest defeat
- Emerging Scotland 7 – 24 Italy U23 (2024)

Emerging Scotland is a Scottish international rugby union team that represents Scotland in selected matches, tours and competitions. Composed of Scotland qualified players only, mostly uncapped or at the beginning of their careers, it forms part of the development pathway to the senior Scotland team. It is not to be confused with the Scotland 'A', the national 'A' team which competes and is a level below the national side but with no age restrictions, nor with the Scotland U-20s with strict age limits that competes in the Under-20 Six Nations and Rugby World Cup.

== History ==
The Emerging Scotland side was part of the National Academy pilot programme which was launched in September 2024 to add increased value to the development of a selected group of promising players. It is part of the Scottish Rugby Male Performance Pathway.

Scotland head coach Gregor Townsend said: “This fixture gives us the opportunity to bring our best young players together for a week of training with the national team coaches and to face a quality international side".

“Similar fixtures that will look to expose emerging talented Scottish players to high level competition will aim to be included going forward. Probably the most important element of a young player’s development is learning by playing at a higher level than you’ve previously experienced. The game has always been the best teacher and we believe that our players will reap the benefits from this experience."

Their first match was a 24-7 loss against Italy, their second match was a 24-19 loss against Tonga XV.

== Current squad ==
There was named a 32 man squad for their match against Tonga XV.

Head Coach: (Scotland) Gregor Townsend

Note: Caps listed are full international caps.

Player	Position	Date of birth (age)	Caps	Club/province
Mikey Jones	Prop	8 July 2002 (age 23)	0	(Scotland) Edinburgh
Jake Shearer	Prop	9 November 2005 (age 20)	0	(Scotland) Glasgow Warriors
Jamie Stewart	Prop	21 April 2006 (age 19)	0	(Scotland) Edinburgh Rugby
Harri Morris	Hooker	13 October 2001 (age 24)	1	(Scotland) Edinburgh
Jerry Blyth-Lafferty	Hooker	6 February 2004 (age 22)	0	(Scotland) Edinburgh
Seb Stephen	Hooker	14 December 2003 (age 22)	0	(Scotland) Glasgow Warriors
Ollie Blyth-Lafferty	Prop	4 April 2006 (age 20)	0	(Scotland) Edinburgh
Cole Lamberton	Prop		0	(Scotland) Edinburgh Rugby
Oliver McKenna	Prop	28 March 2006 (age 20)	0	(Scotland) Glasgow Warriors
Euan McVie	Lock	13 December 2004 (age 21)	0	(Scotland) Edinburgh
Christian Lindsay	Lock		0	(Scotland) Edinburgh
Jare Oguntibeju	Lock	14 May 2002 (age 23)	0	(Scotland) Glasgow Warriors
Ryan Burke	Lock	18 June 2004 (age 21)	0	(Scotland) Glasgow Warriors
Liam McConnell (c)	Flanker	24 June 2004 (age 21)	1	(Scotland) Edinburgh
Freddy Douglas	Flanker	14 May 2002 (age 23)	1	(Scotland) Edinburgh
Josh Taylor	Flanker	28 June 2002 (age 23)	0	(England) Ealing Trailfinders
Macenzzie Duncan	Flanker	23 February 2003 (age 23)	0	(Scotland) Glasgow Warriors
Jonny Morris	Flanker	9 January 2004 (age 22)	0	(Scotland) Glasgow Warriors
Tom Currie	Number 8	21 September 2004 (age 21)	0	(Scotland) Edinburgh
Ben Afshar	Scrum-half	2 April 2003 (age 23)	0	(Scotland) Glasgow Warriors
Conor McAlpine	Scrum-half	27 April 2004 (age 21)	0	(Scotland) Edinburgh
Jack Oliver	Scrum-half	28 April 2003 (age 22)	0	(Scotland) Glasgow Warriors
Cammy Scott	Fly-half	8 September 2001 (age 24)	0	(Scotland) Edinburgh
Matthew Urwin	Fly-half	17 April 2005 (age 20)	0	(Scotland) Glasgow Warriors
Lewis Wells	Wing	20 November 2002 (age 23)	0	(Scotland) Edinburgh
Malelili Satala	Wing	24 October 2004 (age 21)	0	(Scotland) Edinburgh
Kerr Yule	Centre	8 July 2005 (age 20)	0	(Scotland) Glasgow Warriors
Johnny Ventisei	Centre	5 April 2005 (age 21)	0	(Scotland) Glasgow Warriors
Geordie Gwynn	Centre	22 January 2004 (age 22)	0	(England) Ealing Trailfinders
Findlay Thomson	Wing	22 July 2004 (age 21)	0	(Scotland) Edinburgh
Fergus Watson	Wing	26 June 2005 (age 20)	0	(Scotland) Glasgow Warriors
Jack Brown	Fullback	18 June 2005 (age 20)	0	(Scotland) Edinburgh

== See also ==
- List of Scotland national rugby union players
- List of Scotland national rugby union team records

=== Men's national teams ===
==== Senior ====
- Scotland national rugby union team
- Scotland A national rugby union team
- Scotland national rugby sevens team

==== Development ====
- Scotland B national rugby union team
- Scotland Club XV

==== Age grades ====
- Scotland national under-21 rugby union team
- Scotland national under-20 rugby union team
- Scotland national under-19 rugby union team
- Scotland national under-18 rugby union team
- Scotland national under-17 rugby union team
- Scotland national under-16 rugby union team

=== Women's national teams ===
- Scotland women's national rugby union team
- Scotland women's national rugby sevens team
