= Scott Cummings (rugby union) =

Scottish rugby union player (born 1996)

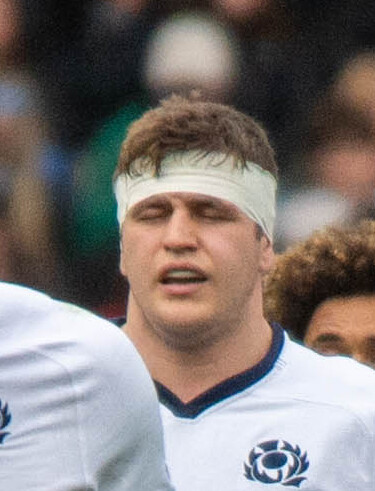
- Cummings in March 2024
- Full name: Scott James Cummings
- Born: 3 December 1996 (age 29) Glasgow, Scotland
- Height: 1.98 m (6 ft 6 in)
- Weight: 116 kg (256 lb; 18 st 4 lb)
- School: Kelvinside Academy
- University: Strathclyde University

Rugby union career
- Position: Lock
- Current team: Glasgow Warriors
Senior career
Years	Team	Apps	(Points)
2015–	Glasgow Warriors	142	(75)
- Correct as of 26 June 2025
International career
Years	Team	Apps	(Points)
2015–2016	Scotland U20	14	(0)
2019–	Scotland	54	(20)
2022	Scotland 'A'	1	(0)
2025	British & Irish Lions	0	(0)
- Correct as of 18 November 2026

Scott James Cummings (born 3 December 1996) is a Scottish professional rugby union player who plays as a lock for United Rugby Championship club Glasgow Warriors and the Scotland national team.

== Early life ==
Cummings was born and grew up in Glasgow.

He captained the school rugby 1st team at Kelvinside Academy. He played for Scotland age groups, captaining some. He moved on to the BT Premiership side Glasgow Hawks. He was confirmed as part of SportScotland's academy system in 2013. Cummings was drafted to Currie in the Scottish Premiership for the 2017-18 season.

== Rugby playing career ==
=== Club career ===
Cummings secured an Elite Development Programme and was aligned to Glasgow Warriors for the 2014–15 season. This meant he could continue playing for Glasgow Hawks whilst training and challenging for a place at the Warriors.

The lock made his debut for Glasgow Warriors in a pre-season friendly against ASM Clermont Auvergne. He went on to make his competitive debut against the Scarlets on 5 September 2015, and scored his first try the following week in a narrow victory against Connacht.

Cummings graduated from the Scottish Rugby Academy and signed a professional contract with Glasgow Warriors on 23 March 2016.

=== International career ===
==== Scotland ====
Cummings was to be capped by Scotland for the under-16s, under-19s and the under-20s. He was in the 2015 Scotland Under-20 World Cup squad. Cummings received his first call up to the senior Scotland squad by coach Gregor Townsend in October 2017 for the Autumn Internationals.

Cummings received his first full senior cap from the bench for Scotland in the World Cup warm-up match against France on 17 August 2019.

He was capped by Scotland 'A' on 25 June 2022 in their match against Chile.

In 2023 Cummings was selected in Scotland's 33 player squad for the 2023 Rugby World Cup in France.

==== British and Irish Lions ====
In May 2025 Cummings was selected by head coach Andy Farrell for the 2025 British & Irish Lions tour to Australia. He made his Lions debut during the first warm-up match, a 24-28 defeat to Argentina in Dublin, on 20 June 2025, becoming Lion #869.

=== Disciplinary record ===
In 2024 Cummings received a one-week ban for a croc roll.

Awards and achievements
Preceded by Jamie Ritchie	22nd Sir Willie Purves Quaich; 2021	Succeeded by Rory Darge
