= Alex Craig (rugby union) =

Scottish rugby union player (born 1997)

- Born: Alexander Iain Craig; 26 April 1997 (age 29) Dumfries, Scotland
- Height: 1.98 m (6 ft 6 in)
- Weight: 118.8 kg (262 lb; 18 st 10 lb)
- University: Hartpury College

Rugby union career
- Position: Lock
Senior career
| Years | Team | Apps | (Points) |
| 2018–2023 | Gloucester | 50 | (15) |
| 2017–2018 | → Hartpury University | 22 | (15) |
| 2023–2025 | Scarlets | 39 | (10) |
| 2025– | Glasgow Warriors | 13 | (0) |
International career
| Years | Team | Apps | (Points) |
- Scotland U18s
| 2016–18 | Scotland U20s | | |
| 2021- | Scotland | 6 | (0) |
| 2026 | Scotland 'A' | 1 | (0) |

Alex Craig (born 26 April 1997) is a Scotland international rugby union player who plays for the Glasgow Warriors in the United Rugby Championship as a lock.

== Rugby Union career ==
=== Amateur career ===
He played for Hartpury College in the BUCS Super Rugby competition and was involved in their win against University of Exeter in their 2015–16 season win coming off the bench.

=== Professional career ===
He played for Hartpury University R.F.C. in the RFU Championship from the 2016–17 season.

On 14 February 2019, Craig signed his first professional contract with Gloucester, thus promoted to the senior squad from the 2019–20 season.

Craig signed for Welsh club the Scarlets on 19 June 2023, having made 49 appearances for Gloucester.

On 23 April 2025 it was announced that Craig would join Glasgow Warriors at the end of the 2024-25 URC Season. He became Glasgow Warrior No. 371 on his debut when he started against Dragons at Scotstoun Stadium. The Glasgow Warriors won the match scoring 7 tries without reply in a 49–0 win, but at a cost to Craig. He was replaced after a head collision in the course of the match and then failed a Head Injury Assessment preventing his return to the field.

=== International career ===
Craig previously played for Scotland U20s in the World Rugby Under 20 Championship from 2016 to 2018.

Craig received his first call up to the senior Scotland squad on 15 January 2020 for the 2020 Six Nations Championship. He made his international debut for Scotland as a replacement versus Italy on 20 March 2021. He gained his second cap, also as a replacement, in Scotland's victory over France in Paris on 26 March 2021. Scotland's first victory against France in Paris since 1999. He gained his third cap, and first start, against USA in 2024. Craig then made his fourth cap off the bench against Chile. He made his fifth cap, and second start, against Portugal. He then made his sixth cap, off the bench, in Scotland's 27–13 victory over Australia on 24 November 2024. Craig was once again named in the Scotland squad for the 2026 Six Nations Championship, but was only selected for one game, making his seventh cap, off the bench in the final game of the tournament away to Ireland.

He played for Scotland 'A' on 6 February 2026 in their match against Italy XV.
