= Ally Miller (rugby union) =

Scottish rugby union player (born 1996)

- Born: 10 May 1996 (age 30) Edinburgh, Scotland
- Height: 1.94 m (6 ft 4 in)
- Weight: 112 kg (247 lb)

Rugby union career
- Position: Back row
Youth career
- Preston Lodge
- Musselburgh
Amateur team(s)
Years	Team	Apps	(Points)
- Melrose
Senior career
Years	Team	Apps	(Points)
2016–2017	London Scottish	16	(8)
2018–2021	Edinburgh Rugby	25	(0)
2021–	Glasgow Warriors	47	(10)
International career
Years	Team	Apps	(Points)
2015–2016	Scotland U20	17	(5)
National sevens team
Years	Team		Comps
2017–2020	Scotland 7s		19 (30)

Ally Miller (born 10 May 1996) is a Scottish rugby union player who plays for Glasgow Warriors in the United Rugby Championship having previously played for Edinburgh Rugby in the Pro14 and London Scottish in the RFU Championship. Miller plays along the back row.

== Rugby Union career ==
=== Amateur career ===
Miller started his rugby career playing at minis with Preston Lodge and Musselburgh as well as attending George Watson's College where he was successful in being part of an undefeated team throughout all of their school rugby fixtures playing alongside Scotland internationals like Jake Kerr and Adam Hastings .

Miller then played for Melrose in the Scottish Premiership.

=== Professional career ===
Miller signed for London Scottish in the 2016–2017 season. He won the Sir Tommy Macpherson Quaich from the Friends of Scottish Rugby for that season.

The following season Miller signed for Edinburgh. Miller made his debut for Edinburgh on 2 November 2018.

Miller signed for Glasgow Warriors in 2021. He said of the move:

I've heard really good things from the boys about the crowd here. Seeing all the games on TV with the Warrior Nation in full voice makes you want to make a good impression and hopefully it's not too long before we get the chance to play in front of them. It's a great pitch here - it really suits fast rugby and that in turn suits the way I enjoy playing.I love having the ball in my hands and attacking. I'm keen to work on my defence though with the coaches here and really bring those aspects further into my game. Hopefully I'll get plenty of opportunity to run with the ball this season, and really enjoy the Glasgow style of play.

Miller made his competitive debut for the provincial Glasgow side on 2 October 2021, against the South African side Sharks, replacing Ryan Wilson at flanker on 70 minutes. Miller earned the Glasgow Warrior No. 335.

=== International career ===
Miller made his Scotland 7s debut in the 2017 World Series in the legs at Las Vegas and Vancouver.
