= Dan Lancaster (rugby union) =

Scottish rugby player (born 2001)

- Born: Dan Lancaster; 23 May 2001 (age 25) Leeds, England
- Height: 1.83 m (6 ft 0 in)
- Weight: 91 kg (14 st 5 lb)
- Notable relative: Stuart Lancaster (father)

Rugby union career
- Position(s): Centre, Fly half
Youth career
- West Park Leeds RUFC
Senior career
Years	Team	Apps	(Points)
2019–2021	Leeds Tykes	19	(15)
2021–2022	Leicester Tigers	5	(29)
2021–2022	→ Nottingham	6	(4)
2022–2024	Ealing Trailfinders	19	(26)
2024–25	Racing 92	9	(32)
2025-	Glasgow Warriors	23	(43)
International career
Years	Team	Apps	(Points)
2018	Scotland U18		
2021	England U20	5	(0)
2026	Scotland 'A'	1	(0)

Dan Lancaster (born 23 May 2001) is a Scotland 'A' international rugby union player who plays club rugby for Glasgow Warriors. He previously played for Racing 92 in the Top 14 and English clubs Leicester Tigers, Ealing Trailfinders, Leeds Tykes and Nottingham. His primary position is fly half, he also plays centre.

== Rugby Union career ==
=== Amateur career ===
Lancaster started playing for local club West Park in Leeds as a 7-year old.

=== Professional career ===
On 15 July 2021, Lancaster signed for Leicester Tigers. He made his Leicester debut as a substitute on 14 November 2021 in a Premiership Rugby Cup win over Sale Sharks, and made his first start a week later scoring 15 points in a 55-7 Premiership Rugby Cup win over Wasps.

On 13 May Lancaster's early release was announced by Leicester, and he was announced as having joined Bond University Rugby Club in Queensland, Australia.

On 13 May 2022, it was confirmed that Lancaster would leave Leicester with immediate effect to join Ealing Trailfinders in the RFU Championship.

In June 2024, he was recruited by Racing 92, a team then coached by his father.

On 2 July 2025 it was confirmed that Lancaster had joined Glasgow Warriors. Lancaster said of the move:

I know a few of the lads from playing together at Scotland U18 – I played with Jamie [Dobie] and Ollie [Smith], and Rory [Darge] was our captain as well. It's been brilliant to see those lads go on and do incredible things for Glasgow and for Scotland, and hopefully I can follow their lead, push on and develop towards that level.

I just want to take it as it comes – every player obviously wants to push for international honours in the long-term, but first and foremost I want to settle in well at Scotstoun and get to know everyone. I want to get my head down, work hard, buy in to what this club is all about and challenge for game time in a Glasgow shirt, I'm not looking any further ahead than that.

I'm naturally very competitive and want to do my bit to help my team achieve everything they can achieve, so hopefully the Warrior Nation can see that passion when I get the chance to run out! I'm excited to get going in a Glasgow shirt.

Lancaster played in Glasgow Warriors two pre-season matches before making his competitive debut against South African side, the Sharks at Scotstoun Stadium. The Warriors won the match with a bonus point win, running out 35 - 19 winners. Lancaster became Glasgow Warrior No. 369.

=== International career ===
In 2018 Lancaster was named in the Scotland under-18 squad, qualifying through his Dumfries-born grandmother.

On 1 January 2021, Lancaster was named in the England Under 20 Elite Player squad, one of only two players from outside Premiership Rugby. He started all five games as England completed a grand slam in the 2021 Six Nations Under 20s Championship.

In January 2026, Lancaster was named in the Scotland 'A' Team to face Italy A He played the match on 6 February 2026 coming on as a replacement for Fergus Burke.

== Family ==
Lancaster is the son of Stuart Lancaster, the former England head coach from 2011 to 2015.
