= Dylan Cockburn =

Scottish rugby union player

- Born: 6 August 2005 (age 21) Melrose, Scotland
- Height: 1.93 m (6 ft 4 in)
- Weight: 112 kg (17 st 9 lb)
- School: Earlston High School

Rugby union career
- Position: Flanker / Lock
Amateur team(s)
Years	Team	Apps	(Points)
2024-25	Melrose		
Senior career
Years	Team	Apps	(Points)
2025-	Glasgow Warriors	3	(0)
Super Rugby
Years	Team	Apps	(Points)
2023-24	Southern Knights		
International career
Years	Team	Apps	(Points)
2024-25	Scotland U20	4	(0)

Dylan Cockburn (born 6 August 2005) is a Scottish rugby union player. He plays for Glasgow Warriors. He previously played for Southern Knights in the Super 6. He has also played for the amateur side Melrose in the Scottish Premiership.

== Rugby Union career ==
=== Amateur career ===
Cockburn played rugby when in school for Earlston High School. He played for Melrose in the Arnold Clark Premiership in season 2024–25.

=== Professional career ===
He played for Southern Knights in season 2023–24 in the Super 6.

He entered the Glasgow Warriors academy in 2025.

Cockburn played in Glasgow Warriors two pre-season matches of 25/26 season before making his competitive debut on 30 January 2026 against Irish side, the Munster at Scotstoun Stadium. The Warriors won the match with a bonus point win, running out 31 - 22 winners. Cockburn nearly scored a try in the last play of the match for the Warriors.

Franco Smith said of Cockburn before his debut:

Dylan has physically grown a lot and he's really applied himself. He's a good ball carrier, a good defender. He adds a lot of weight to the set piece. So I'm excited for him to make that next step.

I definitely think he came in at the beginning of the season as somebody that can progress because of the physical attributes that he has. He still has to learn and grow, I suppose, in this environment. But tomorrow will be a good opportunity to start from there after getting started on his journey.

Cockburn became Glasgow Warrior No. 373. Scott Cummings said when handing him his first cap jersey: 'You don't moan about things. Having to play in the second row, when you are obviously a back row. But you are not looking not of place. You always give 100%.' The Warriors strength and conditioning coach Luke O'Dea said "As a dynamic six, Dylan is going to be really exciting and he got a spin against the Lions and Stormers in South Africa."

=== International career ===
He was capped for Scotland U20 in 2024 and 2025.
