= Seb Stephen =

Scottish rugby union player (born 2005)

- Born: 29 August 2005 (age 21) Aberdeen, Scotland
- Height: 6 ft 2 in (1.88 m)
- Weight: 116 kg (256 lb; 18 st 4 lb)
- School: Glenalmond College

Rugby union career
- Position: Hooker
Amateur team(s)
Years	Team	Apps	(Points)
-	Garioch		
-	Aberdeen Grammar		
-	University of Waikato		
2024-25	Edinburgh Academicals		
Senior career
Years	Team	Apps	(Points)
2025-	Glasgow Warriors	10	(15)
- Correct as of 18 November 2026
International career
Years	Team	Apps	(Points)
2023	Scotland U18		
2024	Scotland U20	9	(0)
2025	Emerging Scotland	1	(0)
2026	Scotland	1	(0)
- Correct as of 18 November 2026

Seb Stephen (born 29 August 2005) is a Scotland international rugby union player who plays for Glasgow Warriors at the Hooker position.

== Rugby Union career ==
=== Amateur career ===
He began his rugby career with Garioch before progressing to play for his school side at Glenalmond College. Following his school years, he joined Aberdeen Grammar and later moved to New Zealand to compete for the University of Waikato. Most recently, he played for Edinburgh Academicals during the 2024–25 season.

=== Professional career ===
He trained with Glasgow Warriors and was named in their Champions Cup squad in March 2025.

He played for Glasgow U23 in their win against Benetton U23 in Italy on 10 May 2025.

He had his first competitive start for the Glasgow Warriors in the URC in May 2025. He was the second player to feature for the Warriors from Garioch since Stuart Corsar twenty years before.

He officially joined the Glasgow Warriors academy for the season 2025-26.

He made his debut for Glasgow in a competitive URC match at the Aviva Stadium against Leinster on 17 May 2025. Stephen became Glasgow Warriors No. 368. He graduated from the academy on 7 April 2026, getting a professional deal with the Warriors.

=== International career ===
On the international stage, he represented Scotland at the U18 level in 2023 before progressing to the U20 squad in 2024. He subsequently made his debut for Emerging Scotland on 17 November 2025.

He was called up to the Scotland squad on 2 March 2026 ahead of their 6 Nations match against France.

He won his debut Scotland cap against Fiji on 11 July 2026, coming off the bench in the 3rd round of the Nations Championship.
