= Macenzzie Duncan =

Scottish rugby union player (born 2003)

- Born: 23 February 2003 (age 23)
- Height: 6 ft 1 in (1.85 m)
- Weight: 105 kg (231 lb; 16 st 7 lb)
- Notable relative(s): Reneeqa Bonner, sister

Rugby union career
- Position: No. 8 / Flanker
Amateur team(s)
Years	Team	Apps	(Points)
-	Clevedon RFC		
-	Weston-super-Mare		
-	Hornets		
-	SGS College		
2023	Sumner RFC		
Senior career
Years	Team	Apps	(Points)
2021–23	Bristol Bears	9	(5)
2023	→ Hartpury University	2	(5)
2024–	Glasgow Warriors	15	(10)
Super Rugby
Years	Team	Apps	(Points)
2024	Stirling Wolves		
International career
Years	Team	Apps	(Points)
2024–	Emerging Scotland	2	(0)

Macenzzie Duncan (born 23 February 2003) is an Emerging Scotland international rugby union player who plays for Glasgow Warriors at the No.8 position. He can also play Flanker.

== Rugby Union career ==
=== Amateur career ===
He began playing rugby with Clevedon RFC in north Somerset, England. He moved on to play for Weston-super-Mare and Hornets.

He went to SGS College in south Gloucestershire and played for the college rugby team.

When with Bristol Bears he was sent to New Zealand to play for Sumner RFC in Christchurch.

He played for Hartpury University rugby side in 2023.

=== Professional career ===
He joined the Bristol Bears academy structure in 2021. He was there until 2023.

He joined Stirling Wolves in early 2024 to play in the SuperSprint series.

After impressing with the Wolves, Duncan joined Glasgow Warriors in 2024, as part of their Scottish Rugby Academy summer intake. He played for Glasgow Warriors 'A' side against Edinburgh 'A' on 18 October 2024.

He was first on the bench for Glasgow in a competitive URC match at Scotstoun against Scarlets on 29 November 2024 but was unused. He was on the bench for the URC match against Connacht on 26 January 2025, but was unused again. He finally made his competitive URC debut for the Warriors on 16 February 2025 against Dragons in an away match at Rodney Parade in Newport. The Warriors won the match 45 - 20. Duncan became Glasgow Warriors No. 367.

On 18 March 2026 he graduated out of the academy to sign a professional contract with Glasgow Warriors.

=== International career ===
He was played in the Emerging Scotland match against Italy Under 23s on 14 December 2024, coming on as a substitute. He was capped again against Tonga XV.

== Family ==
His sister Reneeqa Bonner has played rugby union for the GB7s and has played for England U20s.
