= Kerr Johnston =

Scottish rugby union player (born 2004)

- Born: 12 November 2004 (age 22) Galashiels, Scotland
- Height: 6 ft 4 in (1.93 m)
- Weight: 105 kg (231 lb; 16 st 7 lb)
- School: Galashiels Academy

Rugby union career
- Position: Wing
Amateur team(s)
Years	Team	Apps	(Points)
-2022	Gala		
Senior career
Years	Team	Apps	(Points)
2023–	Glasgow Warriors	2	(0)
2024	→ Ampthill	3	(5)
Super Rugby
Years	Team	Apps	(Points)
2022–23	Boroughmuir Bears		
International career
Years	Team	Apps	(Points)
2022-24	Scotland U20	8	(0)
2024	Emerging Scotland	1	(0)

Kerr Johnston (born 12 November 2004) is a Scotland rugby union player who plays for Glasgow Warriors at the Wing position. He previously played for Gala, Boroughmuir Bears and Ampthill.

== Rugby Union career ==
=== Amateur career ===
He played for Gala through the age grades to first team. He played in the 2022 Selkirk Sevens for the club.

=== Professional career ===
He joined the Boroughmuir Bears in the Super 6 tournament in 2022–23.

After impressing with the Bears, Johnston joined Glasgow Warriors in 2023, as part of their Scottish Rugby Academy summer intake.

He was loaned out to English Championship side Ampthill in November 2024. He played three times for the Bedfordshire club.

Back with the Glasgow club in January 2025, Johnston was on the bench for the Connacht match on 26 January. He was an unused substitute in that match. He finally made his competitive debut for the Warriors on 16 February 2025 against Dragons in an away match at Rodney Parade in Newport. The Warriors won the match 45 - 20. Johnston became Glasgow Warriors No. 366.

He graduated out of the academy, signing a professional contract with the Warriors on 30 April 2026.

=== International career ===
Johnston played for the Scotland U20s from 2022 to 2024.

He played for Emerging Scotland against Italy under 23s on 14 December 2024.
