= Jack Oliver (rugby union) =

Scottish rugby union player (born 2003)

- Born: 28 April 2003 (age 23) Hawick, Scotland
- Height: 1.75 m (5 ft 9 in)
- Weight: 81 kg (12 st 11 lb)
- Notable relative(s): Greig Oliver, father

Rugby union career
- Position: Scrum half
Amateur team(s)
Years	Team	Apps	(Points)
-	Garryowen		
-	Castletroy College		
2025-	Currie Chieftains		
Senior career
Years	Team	Apps	(Points)
2021-25	Munster	0	(0)
2025-	Glasgow Warriors	5	(0)
International career
Years	Team	Apps	(Points)
2022-23	Ireland U20	1	(2)

Jack Oliver (born 28 April 2003) is a Scottish rugby union player. He plays for Glasgow Warriors. He is the son of the former Scotland international scrum half Greig Oliver.

== Rugby Union career ==
=== Amateur career ===
Oliver played for the Limerick side Garryowen and the Castletroy College rugby team.

He was drafted to play for the Currie Chieftains in the Scottish Premiership.

=== Professional career ===
He joined the Munster academy set-up in 2021. He captained their Under 19 side. He played for Munster in their pre-season match against Gloucester on 6 September 2024. With no other first team outings for the Irish side, he was allowed to join the Glasgow Warriors training group in 2025.

He played for Glasgow Warriors at the end of the 2024–25 season in two friendly matches. He played for Glasgow Warriors U23 against Benneton U23 at La Ghirada in Treviso on 6 May 2025, scoring a try in a 52 - 20 win for the Glasgow side. He then played for Glasgow Warriors 'A' in their match against Black Lion of Georgia on 22 May 2025.

He entered the Glasgow Warriors academy officially for the 2025–26 season.

He played in the pre-season match against Bath Rugby on 6 September 2025. He scored a try for Glasgow in the next pre-season match against Northampton Saints on 12 September 2025. He played for the Glasgow 'A' side in their match against Edinburgh 'A' on 25 October 2025.

He made his United Rugby Championship debut for Glasgow Warriors on 3 January 2026, against Zebre Rugby at Scotstoun Stadium in a 47 - 10 bonus point win for the Glasgow side. Oliver became Glasgow Warrior No. 372.

Oliver's second cap was on 29 January 2026 playing against Munster. Glasgow won the match in a bonus point try win. He earned a professional deal with the club, graduating from their academy, on 26 February 2026.

=== International career ===
He was capped for Ireland U20.

He was in the Emerging Scotland squad for the match against Tonga XV on 17 November 2025.

== Family ==
His father was Greig Oliver, a former Scotland international scrum half. He died in a tragic paragliding accident in 2023.
