= Johnny Ventisei =

Scottish rugby player (born 2005)

- Born: 5 April 2005 (age 21) Glasgow, Scotland
- Height: 1.83 m (6 ft 0 in)
- Weight: 99 kg (15 st 8 lb)

Rugby union career
- Position: Centre
Amateur team(s)
Years	Team	Apps	(Points)
-	Glasgow Hutchesons Aloysians		
Senior career
Years	Team	Apps	(Points)
2023-	Glasgow Warriors	1	(0)
2025	→ Edinburgh	0	(0)
Super Rugby
Years	Team	Apps	(Points)
2022-23	Boroughmuir Bears		
2023	FOSROC Future XV		
International career
Years	Team	Apps	(Points)
- Scotland U18
2023-25	Scotland U20	9	(0)
2025-	Emerging Scotland	1	(0)

Johnny Ventisei (born 5 April 2005) is an Emerging Scotland international rugby union player. He plays for Glasgow Warriors. He previously played for Boroughmuir Bears and the FOSROC Future XV in the Super 6. He has also played for the amateur side Glasgow Hutchesons Aloysians.

== Rugby Union career ==
=== Amateur career ===
He played for his school side at St. Aloysius' College where he was captain of the 1st XV before moving on to play for their associated senior club Glasgow Hutchesons Aloysians.

=== Professional career ===
He entered the Glasgow Warriors academy in 2023.

He played for the Boroughmuir Bears in the Super 6 league. He then turned out for the FOSROC Future XV to play in the Super Series.

He was loaned out to Edinburgh Rugby at the end of 2025, however he returned to the Glasgow Warriors and went on to earn a professional contract after his debut match.

Ventisei played in Glasgow Warriors clash against Leinster at Scotstoun Stadium. The Warriors won the match with a bonus point win, running out 38 - 17 winners. Ventisei became Glasgow Warrior No. 375. Ventisei was praised for his excellent performance against Leinster on his professional debut which helped the Glasgow Warriors earn a superb win over the Leinster side.

=== International career ===
He was capped for the Scotland U18 side.

He was gold medallist at the 2023 Commonwealth Youth Games for the Scotland 7s side. This 7's side made history by becoming the first Scottish side to win a rugby medal at the Commonwealth Games. It was also the first ever gold-medal win for any Scottish rugby side at the Commonwealth Games.

He was capped for Scotland U20 and captained the side during the 2025 U20 six nations.

He played for Emerging Scotland against Tonga XV.

== Outside of rugby ==
He is studying business at Strathclyde University.
