= Kerr Yule =

Scottish rugby union player (born 2005)

- Born: 8 July 2005 (age 21) Livingston, Scotland
- Height: 1.89 m (6 ft 2 in)
- Weight: 107 kg (16 st 12 lb)
- Notable relative(s): Stuart Yule, father, Strength & Conditioning Coach

Rugby union career
- Position: Centre
Amateur team(s)
Years	Team	Apps	(Points)
2013-15	Glasgow High Kelvinside		
2015-22	West of Scotland		
2022	Glasgow Hawks		
Senior career
Years	Team	Apps	(Points)
2022-	Glasgow Warriors	4	(0)
Super Rugby
Years	Team	Apps	(Points)
2022-23	Ayrshire Bulls		
2023	FOSROC Future XV		
International career
Years	Team	Apps	(Points)
- Scotland U18
2022-25	Scotland U20	25	(5)
2024-	Emerging Scotland	2	(0)

Kerr Yule (born 8 July 2005) is an Emerging Scotland international rugby union player. He plays for Glasgow Warriors. He previously played for Ayrshire Bulls and the FOSROC Future XV in the Super 6. He has also played for the amateur sides Glasgow High Kelvinside, West of Scotland and Glasgow Hawks.

== Rugby Union career ==
=== Amateur career ===
He played for Glasgow High Kelvinside from the age of 8. He moved to the West of Scotland, before being picked up by Glasgow Hawks in 2022.

=== Professional career ===
He entered the Glasgow Warriors academy in 2022, having played for Glasgow's U18 and U20 sides.

He played for the Ayrshire Bulls in the Super 6 league. He then turned out for the Fosroc Future XV to play in the Super Series.

He played in May 2025's Glasgow Warriors U23 match against Benetton Treviso scoring a try.

Yule played in Glasgow Warriors two pre-season matches of 25/26 season before making his competitive debut against South African side, the Sharks at Scotstoun Stadium. The Warriors won the match with a bonus point win, running out 35 - 19 winners. Yule became Glasgow Warrior No. 370.

He graduated from the Warriors academy on 14 April 2026, signing a professional deal with the Glasgow club.

=== International career ===
He was capped for the Scotland U18 side.

He was capped for Scotland U20. He set the record appearances for the age grade for Scotland in the final match in the U20 World Rugby Championship with 25 caps.

He played for Emerging Scotland against Italy U23 on 14 December 2024. He was capped again against Tonga XV.

== Family ==
His father is Stuart Yule, a strength and conditioning coach for the Scotland international rugby union team.
