= Matthew Urwin (rugby union) =

Scottish rugby union player (born 2005)

- Born: 17 April 2005 (age 21) Bearsden, Scotland
- Height: 1.80 m (5 ft 11 in)
- Weight: 81 kg (12 st 11 lb)
- School: St. Aloysius College
- University: Strathclyde University

Rugby union career
- Position: Fly Half
Amateur team(s)
Years	Team	Apps	(Points)
-	West of Scotland		
2024	Strathclyde University		
Senior career
Years	Team	Apps	(Points)
2023-	Glasgow Warriors	2	(2)
Super Rugby
Years	Team	Apps	(Points)
2023	Future XV	8	
International career
Years	Team	Apps	(Points)
2023	Scotland 7s Youth		
2023	Scotland U18		
2024-25	Scotland U20	11	(27)
2024-25	Emerging Scotland	2	(2)

Matthew Urwin (born 17 April 2005) is an Emerging Scotland international rugby union player. He plays for Glasgow Warriors. He previously played for Future XV in the Super Series and the amateur sides West of Scotland and Strathclyde University RFC. He was a gold medal winner for Scotland at the 2023 Youth Commonwealth Games playing in the Scotland 7s team.

== Rugby Union career ==
=== Amateur career ===
He went to St Aloysius' College and played rugby for the school.

He played for West of Scotland.

While at university he played for Strathclyde University RFC.

=== Professional career ===
He captained the Future XV side in the Super Series.

He entered the Glasgow Warriors academy in 2023.

He was named in various friendly matches for Glasgow Warriors 'A' for their matches against Super Series in 2024. He scored a conversion in Glasgow's last match against the Ayrshire Bulls on 25 May 2024 in a 24–17 win.

The following season he played in the Glasgow 'A' match against Edinburgh 'A' scoring two conversions in a 33–14 loss on 27 September 2024. He later played in the win in Italy against Benetton U23 on 6 May 2025, again scoring two conversions. He scored two conversions in the following Glasgow 'A' match against the Georgian side Black Lion on 22 May 2025.

He made his first start in the full Glasgow Warriors side in the pre-season match against Bath on 6 September 2025. He scored a conversion in Glasgow Warrior's pre-season win over Northampton Saints on 12 September 2025. Another 'A' match on 25 October 2025 against Edinburgh 'A' saw Urwin score another conversion.

Urwin made his competitive debut on 30 January 2026 against Irish side Munster at Scotstoun Stadium. The Warriors won the match with a bonus point win, running out 31–22 winners.

Franco Smith said of Urwin before his competitive debut:

He is a good footballer. He's grown. He also worked really hard in the gym to get his weight up to professional rugby standards. He's got all the potential. Matty is maturing nicely from a decision-making position. So he understands well what we want to do and we'd like to see if he can progress.

Urwin became Glasgow Warrior No. 374. On 19 March 2026 he graduated out of the Warriors academy and signed a professional contract with the club.

=== International career ===
He represented the youth Scotland 7s side at the 2023 Youth Commonwealth Games. Scotland were successful in the tournament and Urwin - along with his now Glasgow Warriors team-mates Johnny Ventisei and Fergus Watson in the 7s side - won the gold medal for Scotland in the Games.

He was capped for Scotland U18 in the 2023 Under 18 Six Nations.

He was capped for Scotland U20 in 2024 and 2025.

He was capped for Emerging Scotland in the match against Italy U23 in December 2024. He played in their next match against Tonga XV scoring a conversion.

== Academic career ==
He studied accountancy and finance at Strathclyde University.
