= Fergus Watson =

Scottish rugby player (born 2005)

- Born: 26 June 2005 (age 21) Livingston, Scotland
- Height: 6 ft 3 in (1.91 m)
- Weight: 105 kg (231 lb; 16 st 7 lb)
- School: Biggar High School
- Notable relative(s): Bill Watson, grandfather

Rugby union career
- Position: Wing
Amateur team(s)
Years	Team	Apps	(Points)
-	Biggar		
Senior career
Years	Team	Apps	(Points)
2023–	Glasgow Warriors	4	(10)
Super Rugby
Years	Team	Apps	(Points)
2023	Future XV	6	
International career
Years	Team	Apps	(Points)
2023	Scotland U18		
2024-25	Scotland U20		
2025	Emerging Scotland	1	(0)

Fergus Watson (born 26 June 2005) is an Emerging Scotland international rugby union player who plays for Glasgow Warriors at the Wing position. He previously played for Biggar RFC and the FOSROC Future XV in the Super Series.

== Rugby Union career ==
=== Amateur career ===
Watson started playing rugby union from the age of six at Biggar RFC and then also played for his school team at Biggar High School.

=== Professional career ===
He played for the Futures XV in the Super Series tournament in 2023.

Watson joined Glasgow Warriors in 2023, as part of their Scottish Rugby Academy summer intake. He played in Glasgow's two preseason matches against Bath and Northampton Saints in 2025. He secured the man-of-the-match in the Saints game. He was then injured playing for Emerging Scotland in their match against Tonga XV and had to spend weeks working on his recovery.

He finally made his competitive debut for the Warriors on 27 March 2026 against Benetton in a home match at Scotstoun. The Warriors won the match in a bonus point 31 - 10 win, with Watson scoring a try on competitive debut in a man-of-the-match display. Watson became Glasgow Warrior No. 376.

On 1 April 2026 Watson was given a professional contract with the club. He received another man of the match performance against the Lions at Scotstoun Stadium on 30 October 2026, scoring the first try of the match.

=== International career ===
He was capped for Scotland U18s in 2023 in the U18 Six Nations tournament.

Watson played for the Scotland U20s from 2024, making his first cap against Wales U20.

He played for Emerging Scotland against Italy under 23s on 14 December 2024.

== Family ==
His grandfather Bill Watson played at No. 8 for Scotland in the 1970s.
