= Ryan Burke (rugby union) =

Scottish rugby union player (born 2004)

- Born: 18 June 2004 (age 22) Milngavie, Scotland
- Height: 2.01 m (6 ft 7 in)
- Weight: 117 kg (18 st 6 lb)

Rugby union career
- Position: Lock
Amateur team(s)
Years	Team	Apps	(Points)
-	West of Scotland		
2022-25	Glasgow Hawks		
Senior career
Years	Team	Apps	(Points)
2023-	Glasgow Warriors	1	(0)
Super Rugby
Years	Team	Apps	(Points)
2023	Future XV		
International career
Years	Team	Apps	(Points)
2024	Scotland U20	6	(10)
2025	Emerging Scotland	1	(0)

Ryan Burke (born 18 June 2004) is a Emerging Scotland international rugby union player. He plays for Glasgow Warriors. He previously played for the Future XV in the Super Series and the amateur sides West of Scotland and Glasgow Hawks.

== Rugby Union career ==
=== Amateur career ===
He played for his local club West of Scotland, in Milngavie, till he was 18. He played for West in the 2022 National Under-18 Youth Cup final at Murrayfield.

He later played for Glasgow Hawks, from where he made his entry to the Glasgow Warriors academy. He was Hawks 2nd XV player of the year in 2023. In the 2024-25 season, while at Glasgow Warriors he was assigned back to Glasgow Hawks in the Premiership draft.

=== Professional career ===
A Warriors fan from boyhood, Burke joined the Glasgow Warriors academy in 2023.

He played for the Future XV side in the Super Series in 2023.

He played for Glasgow Warriors in the pre-season friendly against Zebre at the Stadio Sergio Lanfranchi in Italy on 30 August 2024. Franco Smith praised the young side despite their defeat. He praised both Burke and Oguntibeju's performance: "I thought Jare [Oguntibeju] and Ryan [Burke] both stood up impressively in the second-row – they are two young men and young athletes that have a lot of potential, and I thought they acquitted themselves very well around the field."

He played on 6 May 2025's Glasgow Warriors U23 match against Benetton Treviso.

He made his competitive debut for Glasgow Warriors on 18 April 2026. He came on as a replacement in the match against Lions at Ellis Park Stadium in South Africa. He became Glasgow Warrior No. 377.

On 18 June 2026 he graduated from the Warriors academy to win a senior contract with the club; the ninth academy graduate of the season.

=== International career ===
He played for Scotland U20 in 2024. He won the World Rugby Under 20 Trophy with Scotland that year.

He played for Emerging Scotland in their match against Tonga XV in November 2025, coming on as a substitute for Euan McVie after 30 minutes.

== Outside of rugby ==
Burke worked as a landscaper.
