= 2019–20 Scottish Rugby Academy season =

Scottish Rugby Academy 2019 / 2020

The Scottish Rugby Academy provides Scotland's up and coming rugby stars a dedicated focused routeway for development into the professional game. Entry is restricted to Scottish qualified students and both male and female entrants are accepted into 4 regional academies. The 2019-20 season sees the fifth year of the academy, now sponsored by Fosroc.

== Season overview ==
This was the fifth year of the Scottish Rugby Academy.

== Regional Academies ==
The Scottish Rugby Academy runs four regional academies in Scotland:- Glasgow and the West, Borders and East Lothian, Edinburgh and Caledonia. These roughly correspond to the traditional districts of Glasgow District, South, Edinburgh District and North and Midlands.

== Stages ==
Players are selected in three stages:-

=== Supported stages ===
- Stage 1 - Regionally selected and regionally supported players
- Stage 2 - Nationally selected and regionally supported players

=== Contracted stage ===
- Stage 3 - Nationally selected and regionally supported players assigned to a professional team.

== Academy Players ==
=== Stage 3 players ===
Stage 3 players are assigned to a professional team. Nominally, for the men, Glasgow Warriors receive the Stage 3 players of Glasgow and the West and Caledonia regions, while Edinburgh Rugby receive the Stage 3 players of the Edinburgh and Borders and East Lothian regions. The women are integrated into the Scotland women's national rugby sevens team and the Scotland women's national rugby union team.

This season some of the Stage 3 players were additionally loaned out to Stade Niçois for their development.

This year, in addition to being assigned to Glasgow Warriors and Edinburgh Rugby, the male Stage 3 players are also assigned to the professional Super 6 sides. Thus, half of the Super 6 teams are allied to Glasgow Warriors:- Stirling County, Ayrshire Bulls and Boroughmuir Bears; the other half allied to Edinburgh Rugby:- Watsonians, Southern Knights and Heriot's Rugby.

==== Borders and East Lothian ====
Jacob Henry and Nathan Sweeney join the Borders Academy at Stage 3 this season; Henry being promoted from Stage 2 and Sweeney a direct entrant. Fraser Renwick drops out from last year.

Note: Flags indicate national union under World Rugby eligibility rules. Players may hold more than one non-World Rugby nationality.

| Player | Position | Union |
|---|---|---|
| Finlay Scott | Hooker | Scotland |
| Rory Darge | Flanker | Scotland |

| Player | Position | Union |
|---|---|---|
| Roan Frostwick | Scrum-half | Scotland |
| Jacob Henry | Wing | Scotland |
| Nathan Sweeney | Fullback | Scotland |

==== Caledonia ====
Angus Fraser, Gregor Brown and Grant Hughes all join the Caledonia Academy this season; Fraser and Hughes being promoted from the Stage 2 section of last year's academy, Brown as a direct entrant . Ollie Smith transfers in from the Glasgow Academy; Murphy Walker transfers from the Caledonia Academy to the Glasgow Academy.

Note: Flags indicate national union under World Rugby eligibility rules. Players may hold more than one non-World Rugby nationality.

| Player | Position | Union |
|---|---|---|
| Angus Fraser | Hooker | Scotland |
| Cameron Henderson | Lock | Scotland |
| Gregor Brown | Flanker | Scotland |

| Player | Position | Union |
|---|---|---|
| Grant Hughes | Centre | Scotland |
| Ollie Smith | Centre | Scotland |

==== Edinburgh ====
Matt Currie, Dan Gamble, Sam Grahamslaw, Charlie Jupp, Scott King, Jack Mann, Harry Paterson and Cameron Scott all join as Stage 3 players this year in addition to stalwarts Shaun Gunn, Dan Winning, Connor Boyle. Jupp and Gamble were promoted from last year's Stage 2; the others joining as direct entrants. Rufus McLean transfers to the Glasgow Academy. Duncan Ferguson, Callum Atkinson, and Robbie Davis all drop out. Ross Dunbar has signed with Stade Niçois.

Note: Flags indicate national union under World Rugby eligibility rules. Players may hold more than one non-World Rugby nationality.

| Player | Position | Union } |
|---|---|---|
| Dan Gamble | Prop | Scotland |
| Sam Grahamslaw | Prop | Scotland |
| Shaun Gunn | Prop | Scotland |
| Dan Winning | Prop | Scotland |
| Charlie Jupp | Lock | Scotland |
| Connor Boyle | Flanker | Scotland |
| Jack Mann | Flanker | Scotland |

| Player | Position | Union |
|---|---|---|
| Cameron Scott | Fly-half | Scotland |
| Matt Currie | Centre | Scotland |
| Scott King | Centre | Scotland |
| Harry Paterson | Wing | Scotland |

==== Glasgow and the West ====
Rufus McLean transfers in from the Edinburgh Academy. Murphy Walker transfers in from the Caledonia Academy. Ollie Smith transfers to the Caledonia Academy. Kaleem Barreto is loaned out to Stade Niçois. Logan Trotter has signed for Super 6 side Stirling Wolves. The lock Rory Jackson is promoted from Stage 2

Note: Flags indicate national union under World Rugby eligibility rules. Players may hold more than one non-World Rugby nationality.

| Player | Position | Union |
|---|---|---|
| Euan McLaren | Prop | Scotland |
| Murphy Walker | Prop | Scotland |
| Rory Jackson | Hooker | Scotland |
| Marshall Sykes | Lock | Scotland |
| Rory Jackson | Lock | Scotland |

| Player | Position | Union |
|---|---|---|
| Kristian Kay | Scrum-half | Scotland |
| Ross Thompson | Fly-half | Scotland |
| Robbie McCallum | Centre | Scotland |
| Rufus McLean | Fullback | Scotland |

==== Stade Niçois ====
Stade Niçois is a French rugby union side. In season 2019-20 they play in the French third tier, in Fédérale 1. They have a partnership agreement with the SRU.

Cammy Hutchison from last year's Academy has now signed with Heriots Rugby.

Note: Flags indicate national union under World Rugby eligibility rules. Players may hold more than one non-World Rugby nationality.

| Player / Position / Union; Hamish Bain / Lock / Scotland | Player / Position / Union; Kaleem Barreto (loan) / Scrum-half / Scotland |

=== Supported players ===
The inductees for the 2019-20 season are split into their regional academies. The male players are still in Stage 1 and Stage 2 of the academy and not yet deemed professional players. The women named, however, may be international players, using the academy for support.

==== Borders and East Lothian ====
- Archie Bogle (Melrose / Duns) - Prop
- Scott Clark (Preston Lodge) - Fly Half
- Kieran Clarke (Earlston HS / Melrose) - Full Back
- Sam Derrick (Earlston HS / Melrose) - Flanker
- Patrick Harrison (Peebles) - Hooker
- Thomas Jeffrey (Jed Forest) - Prop
- James Johnstone (Preston Lodge) - Hooker
- Vangel Kacori (Watsonians) - Center
- Matthew Kindness (Kelso) - Center
- Ben Pickles (Preston Lodge) - Center
- Matt Reid (Galashiels Academy / Wanderers) - Wing
- Mak Wilson (Southern Knights) - Prop
- Lana Skeldon (DMP Sharks)
- Corey Tait (Hawick HS / RFC)

==== Caledonia ====
- Tim Brown (Dundee HSFP) - Flanker
- Euan Cunningham (Stirling County) - Fly Half
- Jack Duncan (Ellon) - Fly Half
- Archie Falconer (Ellon) - Hooker
- Thomas Glendinning (Kirkcaldy) - Center
- Michael Gray (Dollar Academy) - Center
- Joe Halliday (Strathallan) - Hooker
- Mikey Heron (Stirling Wolves) - Full Back
- Josh King (Stirling County) - Flanker
- Ross McKnight (Dollar Academy) - Wing
- Alex Samuel (Stirling County) - Lock
- Ben Salmon (Dollar Academy) - Wing
- Callum Stephen (Deeside Rugby) - Wing
- Max Williamson (Dollar Academy) - Lock/Flanker
- Siobhan Cattigan (Stirling County)
- Mairi Forsyth (Corstorphine Cougars)
- Emma Wassell (Corstorphine Cougars)
- Megan Kennedy (Stirling County).

==== Edinburgh ====
- Callum Anderson (George Heriot’s School) - Lock
- Ryan Daley (George Watson’s College) - Wing
- Angus Hoffie (George Watson’s College) - Wing
- Duncan Hood (Stewart’s Melville College) - Hooker
- Michael Jones (Stewart’s Melville College) - Flanker/Prop
- Cole Lamberton (Edinburgh Accies) - Prop
- Fraser MacAslan (Royal High School) - Hooker
- Gregor Scougall (George Watson’s College) - Prop
- Struan Whittaker (Edinburgh Accies) - Lock
- Patrick McVeigh (Heriot’s Rugby / Edinburgh University) - Flanker
- Cameron Scott (Watsonians) - Scrum Half
- Robbie Simpson (Edinburgh Accies) - Hooker
- Christian Townsend (Stewart’s Melville College) - Fly Half
- Sarah Denholm (Edinburgh University)
- Megan Gaffney (Watsonians)
- Nicola Howat (Edinburgh University)
- Sarah Law (DMP Sharks)
- Liz Musgrove (DMP Sharks)
- Panashe Muzambe (Edinburgh University / Watsonians)
- Annabel Sergeant (Heriot’s)
- Hannah Smith (Watsonians)
- Lisa Thomson (DMP Sharks)
- Molly Wright (Watsonians)

==== Glasgow and the West ====
- Trystan Andrews (Melrose) - Flanker
- George Breese (Stirling County) - Prop
- Finlay Callaghan (GHK) - Full Back
- Jamie Campbell (Biggar) - Lock
- Scott Clelland (Ayr) - Hooker
- Jordan Craig (GHA) - Wing
- Jamie Drummond (Marr) - Prop/Hooker
- Dean Hunter (Stirling County) - Prop
- Adam Scott (GHA) - Center
- Joseph Strain (Glasgow Hawks) - Fly Half
- Gavin Wilson (Ayrshire Bulls) - Flanker
- Cameron Young (Ayr) - Flanker
- Sophie Anderson (Hillhead Jordanhill)
- Rachel McLachlan (DMP Sharks)
- Louise McMillan (Hillhead Jordanhill)

=== Super 6 intake ===
==== Ayrshire Bulls ====
Note: Flags indicate national union under World Rugby eligibility rules. Players may hold more than one non-World Rugby nationality.

| Player | Position | Union |
|---|---|---|
| Rory Jackson | Lock | Scotland |
| Marshall Sykes | Lock | Scotland |

| Player | Position | Union |
|---|---|---|
| Ross Thompson | Fly-half | Scotland |
| Ollie Smith | Centre | Scotland |

==== Boroughmuir Bears ====
Note: Flags indicate national union under World Rugby eligibility rules. Players may hold more than one non-World Rugby nationality.

| Player | Position | Union |
|---|---|---|
| Dan Winning | Prop | Scotland |
| Gregor Brown | Flanker | Scotland |

| Player | Position | Union |
|---|---|---|
| Cameron Scott | Fly-half | Scotland |
| Robbie McCallum | Centre | Scotland |
| Rufus McLean | Fullback | Scotland |

==== Heriots Rugby ====
Note: Flags indicate national union under World Rugby eligibility rules. Players may hold more than one non-World Rugby nationality.

| Player | Position | Union |
|---|---|---|
| Dan Gamble | Prop | Scotland |
| Charlie Jupp | Lock | Scotland |
| Jack Mann | Flanker | Scotland |

| Player | Position | Union |
|---|---|---|
| Scott King | Centre | Scotland |
| Harry Paterson | Wing | Scotland |

==== Southern Knights ====
Note: Flags indicate national union under World Rugby eligibility rules. Players may hold more than one non-World Rugby nationality.

| Player | Position | Union |
|---|---|---|
| Shaun Gunn | Prop | Scotland |
| Finlay Scott | Hooker | Scotland |
| Rory Darge | Flanker | Scotland |

| Player | Position | Union |
|---|---|---|
| Jacob Henry | Wing | Scotland |
| Nathan Sweeney | Fullback | Scotland |

==== Stirling County ====
Note: Flags indicate national union under World Rugby eligibility rules. Players may hold more than one non-World Rugby nationality.

| Player | Position | Union |
|---|---|---|
| Euan McLaren | Prop | Scotland |
| Murphy Walker | Prop | Scotland |
| Angus Fraser | Hooker | Scotland |
| Cameron Henderson | Lock | Scotland |

| Player | Position | Union |
|---|---|---|
| Kristian Kay | Scrum-half | Scotland |
| Grant Hughes | Centre | Scotland |

==== Watsonians ====
Note: Flags indicate national union under World Rugby eligibility rules. Players may hold more than one non-World Rugby nationality.

| Player | Position | Union |
|---|---|---|
| Sam Grahamslaw | Prop | Scotland |
| Rory Jackson | Hooker | Scotland |
| Connor Boyle | Flanker | Scotland |

| Player | Position | Union |
|---|---|---|
| Roan Frostwick | Scrum-half | Scotland |
| Matt Currie | Centre | Scotland |

== Graduates of this year ==
Players who have signed professional contracts with clubs:

- (Scotland) Cameron Henderson to (England) Leicester Tigers
- (Scotland) Marshall Sykes to (Scotland) Edinburgh Rugby
- (Scotland) Rufus McLean to (Scotland) Glasgow Warriors
