= 2018–19 Scottish Rugby Academy season =

Scottish Rugby Academy 2018 / 2019

The Scottish Rugby Academy provides Scotland's up and coming rugby stars a dedicated focused routeway for development into the professional game. Entry is restricted to Scottish qualified students and both male and female entrants are accepted into 4 regional academies. The 2018–19 season sees the fourth year of the academy, now sponsored by Fosroc.

== Season overview ==
This was the fourth year of the Scottish Rugby Academy.

== Regional Academies ==
The Scottish Rugby Academy runs four regional academies in Scotland:- Glasgow and the West, Borders and East Lothian, Edinburgh and Caledonia. These roughly correspond to the traditional districts of Glasgow District, South, Edinburgh District and North and Midlands.

== Stages ==
Players are selected in three stages:-

=== Supported stages ===
- Stage 1 - Regionally selected and regionally supported players
- Stage 2 - Nationally selected and regionally supported players

=== Contracted stage ===
- Stage 3 - Nationally selected and regionally supported players assigned to a professional team.

== Academy Players ==
=== Stage 3 players ===
Stage 3 players are assigned to a professional team. Nominally, for the men, Glasgow Warriors receive the Stage 3 players of Glasgow and the West and Caledonia regions, while Edinburgh Rugby receive the Stage 3 players of the Edinburgh and Borders and East Lothian regions. The women are integrated into the Scotland women's national rugby sevens team and the Scotland women's national rugby union team.

This season some of the Stage 3 players were additionally loaned out to Stade Niçois for their development.

A second intake will be announced after the age-grade championships conclude in August.

==== Borders and East Lothian ====
Note: Flags indicate national union under World Rugby eligibility rules. Players may hold more than one non-World Rugby nationality.

Player	Position	Union
Fraser Renwick	Hooker	Scotland
Finlay Scott	Hooker	Scotland
Rory Darge	Flanker	Scotland

Player	Position	Union
Roan Frostwick	Scrum-half	Scotland

==== Caledonia ====
Note: Flags indicate national union under World Rugby eligibility rules. Players may hold more than one non-World Rugby nationality.

Player	Position	Union
Murphy Walker	Prop	Scotland
Cameron Henderson	Lock	Scotland

Player	Position	Union
Logan Trotter	Wing	Scotland

==== Edinburgh ====
Note: Flags indicate national union under World Rugby eligibility rules. Players may hold more than one non-World Rugby nationality.

Player	Position	Union
Ross Dunbar	Prop	Scotland
Duncan Ferguson	Prop	Scotland
Shaun Gunn	Prop	Scotland
Dan Winning	Prop	Scotland
Calum Atkinson	Lock	Scotland
Connor Boyle	Flanker	Scotland

Player	Position	Union
Robbie Davis	Scrum-half	Scotland
George Spencer	Wing	Scotland
Jack Blain	Wing	Scotland
Rufus McLean	Fullback	Scotland

==== Glasgow and the West ====
Note: Flags indicate national union under World Rugby eligibility rules. Players may hold more than one non-World Rugby nationality.

Player	Position	Union
Euan McLaren	Prop	Scotland
Robbie Smith	Hooker	Scotland
Grant Stewart	Hooker	Scotland
Marshall Sykes	Lock	Scotland

Player	Position	Union
Kaleem Barreto	Scrum-half	Scotland
Ross Thompson	Fly-half	Scotland
Stafford McDowall	Centre	Scotland
Ollie Smith	Centre	Scotland

==== Stade Niçois ====
Stade Niçois is a French rugby union side. In season 2018-19 they play in the French third tier, in Fédérale 1. They have a partnership agreement with the SRU.

Note: Flags indicate national union under World Rugby eligibility rules. Players may hold more than one non-World Rugby nationality.

Player / Position / Union; Hamish Bain / Lock / Scotland	Player / Position / Union; Cammy Hutchison / Centre / Scotland

=== Supported players ===
The inductees for the 2018–19 season are split into their regional academies.

==== Borders and East Lothian ====
- Anna Forsyth (Watsonians)
- Lauren Harris (Melrose Ladies/Edinburgh University)
- Jacob Henry (Melrose)
- Scott King (Preston Lodge)
- Thomas Jeffrey (Jed-Forest)
- Matt Kindness (Kelso)
- Will Owen (Melrose)
- Lana Skeldon (Watsonians)
- Mak Wilson (Melrose).

==== Caledonia ====
- Karen Dunbar (Corstorphine Cougars)
- Megan Kennedy (Stirling County)
- Emma Wassell (Murrayfield Wanderers).

==== Edinburgh ====
- Sula Callander (Murrayfield Wanderers)
- Jamie Dobie (Merchiston Castle School)
- Dan Gamble (Merchiston Castle School)
- George Goodenough (Boroughmuir)
- Adam Hall (Currie Chieftains)
- Jamie Hodgson (Watsonians)
- Nicola Howatt (Edinburgh University)
- Charlie Jupp (Heriot's)
- Rachel Law (Edinburgh University)
- Sarah Law (Murrayfield Wanderers)
- Lisa Thomson (DMP Sharks).

==== Glasgow and the West ====
- Scott Clelland (Ayr)
- Paddy Dewhirst (Ayr)
- Angus Fraser (Glasgow Hawks)
- Murray Godsman (Glasgow Hawks)
- Grant Hughes (Stirling County)
- Rory Jackson (Kelvinside Academy)
- Andrew Jardine (Melrose)
- Guy Kelly (Biggar)
- Luhann Kotze (Biggar)
- Mairi McDonald (Hillhead Jordanhill)
- Louise McMillan (Hillhead Jordanhill)
- Andrew Nimmo (Glasgow Hawks)
- Kyle Rowe (Ayr)
- Siobhan McMillan (Hillhead Jordanhill)
- Gavin Wilson (Glasgow Hawks)
- Dan York (Glasgow Hawks).

== Graduates of this year ==
Players who have signed professional contracts with clubs:

- (Scotland) Grant Stewart to (Scotland) Glasgow Warriors
- (Scotland) Stafford McDowall to (Scotland) Glasgow Warriors
- (Scotland) Jamie Dobie to (Scotland) Glasgow Warriors
- (Scotland) Thomas Gordon to (Scotland) Glasgow Warriors
- (Scotland) Jack Blain to (Scotland) Edinburgh Rugby
- Kyle Rowe to Scotland 7s
- (Scotland) Robbie Smith to (England) Bedford Blues
- (Scotland) George Spencer to (England) Jersey Reds
