= 2020–21 Scottish Rugby Academy season =

Scottish Rugby Academy 2020 / 2021

The Scottish Rugby Academy provides Scotland's up and coming rugby stars a dedicated focused routeway for development into the professional game. Entry is restricted to Scottish qualified students and both male and female entrants are accepted into 4 regional academies. The 2020–21 season sees the sixth year of the academy, now sponsored by Fosroc.

== Season overview ==
This was the six year of the Scottish Rugby Academy.

== Regional Academies ==
The Scottish Rugby Academy runs four regional academies in Scotland:- Glasgow and the West, Borders and East Lothian, Edinburgh and Caledonia. These roughly correspond to the traditional districts of Glasgow District, South, Edinburgh District and North and Midlands.

== Stages ==
Players are selected in three stages:-

=== Supported stages ===
- Stage 1 - Regionally selected and regionally supported players
- Stage 2 - Nationally selected and regionally supported players

=== Contracted stage ===
- Stage 3 - Nationally selected and regionally supported players assigned to a professional team.

== Academy Players ==
=== Stage 3 players ===
Stage 3 players are assigned to a professional team. Nominally, for the men, Glasgow Warriors receive the Stage 3 players of Glasgow and the West and Caledonia regions, while Edinburgh Rugby receive the Stage 3 players of the Edinburgh and Borders and East Lothian regions. The women are integrated into the Scotland women's national rugby sevens team and the Scotland women's national rugby union team.

This season, due to the coronavirus pandemic, no Stage 3 players were loaned out to Stade Niçois or to the Super 6 sides.

Instead the Stage 3 players were assigned directly to Glasgow Warriors and Edinburgh Rugby.

==== Glasgow Warriors ====
Note: Flags indicate national union under World Rugby eligibility rules. Players may hold more than one non-World Rugby nationality.

Player	Position	Union
Tom Lambert	Prop	Scotland
Murphy Walker	Prop	Scotland
Angus Fraser	Hooker	Scotland
Alex Samuel	Lock	Scotland
Max Williamson	Lock	Scotland
Gregor Brown	Flanker	Scotland
Rory Jackson	Flanker	Scotland

Player	Position	Union
Euan Cunningham	Fly-half	Scotland
Ross Thompson	Fly-half	Scotland
Connor de Bruyn	Centre	Scotland
Michael Gray	Centre	Scotland
Robbie McCallum	Centre	Scotland
Finlay Callaghan	Wing	Scotland
Ollie Melville	Fullback	Scotland
Ollie Smith	Fullback	Scotland

==== Edinburgh ====
Note: Flags indicate national union under World Rugby eligibility rules. Players may hold more than one non-World Rugby nationality.

Player	Position	Union
Dan Gamble	Prop	Scotland
Shaun Gunn	Prop	Scotland
Cole Lamberton	Prop	Scotland
Patrick Harrison	Hooker	Scotland
Charlie Jupp	Lock	Scotland
Jack Mann	Flanker	Scotland
Ben Muncaster	Flanker	Scotland

Player	Position	Union
Roan Frostwick	Scrum-half	Scotland
Nathan Chamberlain	Fly-half	Scotland
Cameron Scott	Fly-half	Scotland
Matt Currie	Centre	Scotland
Scott King	Centre	Scotland
Jacob Henry	Wing	Scotland
Harry Paterson	Fullback	Scotland
Nathan Sweeney	Fullback	Scotland

==== Stade Niçois ====
Due to the coronavirus pandemic, no academy players were assigned to Stade Niçois this season.

==== Super 6 intake ====
Due to the coronavirus pandemic, the Super 6 competition was suspended for the 2020–21 season. No academy players were assigned to Super 6 sides this season.

=== Supported players ===
The inductees for the 2020–21 season are split into their regional academies. The male players are still in Stage 1 and Stage 2 of the academy and not yet deemed professional players. The women named, however, may be international players, using the academy for support.

==== Borders and East Lothian ====
- Thomas Jeffrey (Jed-Forest)
- Jamie Gordon (Gala Wanderers)
- Corey Tait (Hawick HS/Youth)
- Marcus Brogan (Hawick HS/Youth)
- Hamish Mollart (Loretto School/Melrose RFC)
- Ben Weir (Earlston HS/Melrose RFC)
- Lochie Milne (Dunbar GS/RFC)
- Sam Derrick (Earlston HS/Melrose RFC)
- Taylor Wilson (Dunbar GS/RFC)
- Finlay Duraj (Loretto School)
- Ben Lynch (Melrose RFC)
- Finlay Thomson (Dunbar GS/RFC)
- Luke Townsend (Earlston HS/Melrose RFC)
- Ben Pickles (Selkirk RFC)
- Roly Brett (Melrose RFC)
- Finlay Douglas (Earlston HS/Melrose RFC)
- Murray Wilson (Gala Academy/Wanderers)
- Elliot Stanger (Hawick HS/Youth)
- Matt Reid (Gala Wanderers)
- Sandy Graham (Dunbar GS/RFC)
- Kieran Clark (Southern Knights)
- Rudi Brown (Earlston HS/Melrose RFC)

==== Caledonia ====
- Finlay Burgess (Deeside Rugby)
- Ben Salmon (Dollar Academy)
- Samuel Wallace (Dollar Academy)
- Adam Flynn (Dundee HSFP RFC)
- Moby Ogunlaja (Dundee HSFP RFC)
- Archie Falconer (Ellon Rugby)
- Callum Stephen (Gordonians RFC)
- Jake Spurway (Glenalmond College)
- Harris Mitchell (Mackie Academy FP RFC)
- Andrew McLean (Robert Gordon's College)
- Ross McKnight (Stirling County RFC)
- Mikey Heron (Stirling County Wolves)
- Joe Halliday (Stirling County Wolves)
- Jack Duncan (Stirling County Wolves)
- Andy Stirrat (Strathallan School)
- Callum Beckett (Strathallan School)
- Harris McLeod (Strathallan School)
- Duncan Webb (Strathallan School)
- Callum Norrie (Strathallan School)
- Jonny Morris (Strathallan School)
- Eric Davey (Strathallan School)

==== Edinburgh ====
- Fraser McAslan (Edinburgh Accies)
- Duncan Hood (Heriots Blues)
- Gregor Scougall (Currie Chieftains)
- Callum Anderson (Heriots Blues)
- Angus Hoffie (Currie Chieftains)
- Ryan Daley (Currie Chieftains)
- Cameron Scott (Currie Chieftains)
- Michael Jones (Boroughmuir Bears)
- Archie Bogle (Heriots Blues)
- Teddy Thomson (Merchiston Castle School)
- Robert Gordon (Stewarts Melville College)
- Ben Afshar (Merchiston Castle School)
- Matthew Russell (Stewarts Melville College)
- Aidan Boyle (Stewarts Melville College)
- Zack Smith (George Heriots School)
- Daniel King (Stewarts Melville College)
- Ben Evans (Stewarts Melville College)
- Harvey Cameron-Barr (The Edinburgh Academy)
- Michael Cantle (George Watsons College)
- Alex Burns (The Edinburgh Academy)
- Brodie Young (George Watsons College)

==== Glasgow and the West ====
- Ali Rodgers (Cumnock)
- Aaron Burgess (Kelvinside Academy)
- Dylan Maxwell (Allan Glens)
- Ewan Brannan (Kelvinside Academy)
- Jamie McEntegart (St Aloysius)
- Theo McKenna (St Aloysius)
- Josh Reed (GHA)
- Ben Skinner (St Columbas)
- Rory Gordon (Dumfries Saints)
- Nairn Calder (Marr)
- Duncan Munn (Kelvinside Academy)
- Jacob Peacock (GHA)
- Calum Ferrie (Kelvinside Academy)
- Euan Muirhead (Dumfries Saints)
- Aiden O'Connor (Ayr)
- Charlie Kennedy (High School of Glasgow)
- George Breese (Stirling County)
- Chris Elliott (Cartha Queens Park)
- Jamie Drummond (Ayrshire Bulls)
- Jamie Campbell (Boroughmuir Bears)
- Trystan Andrews (Glasgow Hawks)
- Cameron Young (Ayr)
- Christian Townsend (Ayrshire Bulls)
- Thomas Glendinning (Glasgow Hawks)
- Jordan Craig (GHA)
- Adam Scott (GHA)

== Graduates of this year ==
Players who have signed professional contracts with clubs:

- (Scotland) Ross Thompson to (Scotland) Glasgow Warriors
- (Scotland) Ollie Smith to (Scotland) Glasgow Warriors
- (Scotland) Tom Lambert to (Scotland) Glasgow Warriors
