= 2021–22 Scottish Rugby Academy season =

Scottish Rugby Academy 2021 / 2022

The Scottish Rugby Academy provides Scotland's up and coming rugby stars a dedicated focused routeway for development into the professional game. Entry is restricted to Scottish qualified students and both male and female entrants are accepted into 4 regional academies. The 2021–22 season sees the seventh year of the academy, now sponsored by Fosroc.

== Season overview ==
This was the seventh year of the Scottish Rugby Academy.

== Regional Academies ==
The Scottish Rugby Academy runs four regional academies in Scotland:- Glasgow and the West, Borders and East Lothian, Edinburgh and Caledonia. These roughly correspond to the traditional districts of Glasgow District, South, Edinburgh District and North and Midlands.

== Stages ==
Players are selected in three stages:-

=== Supported stages ===
- Stage 1 - Regionally selected and regionally supported players
- Stage 2 - Nationally selected and regionally supported players

=== Contracted stage ===
- Stage 3 - Nationally selected and regionally supported players assigned to a professional team.

== Academy Players ==
=== Stage 3 players ===
Stage 3 players are assigned to a professional team. Nominally, for the men, Glasgow Warriors receive the Stage 3 players of Glasgow and the West and Caledonia regions, while Edinburgh Rugby receive the Stage 3 players of the Edinburgh and Borders and East Lothian regions. The women are integrated into the Scotland women's national rugby sevens team and the Scotland women's national rugby union team.

The Stage 3 players were assigned directly to Glasgow Warriors and Edinburgh Rugby.

However they were also assigned to the Super 6 sides when not in use by the United Rugby Championship sides.

==== Glasgow Warriors ====
Note: Flags indicate national union under World Rugby eligibility rules. Players may hold more than one non-World Rugby nationality.

Player	Position	Union
Murphy Walker	Prop	Scotland
Jamie Drummond	Hooker	Scotland
Angus Fraser	Hooker	Scotland
Euan Ferrie	Lock	Scotland
Alex Samuel	Lock	Scotland
Max Williamson	Lock	Scotland
Gregor Brown	Flanker	Scotland
Rory Jackson	Flanker	Scotland
Rhys Tait	Flanker	Scotland

Player	Position	Union
Euan Cunningham	Fly-half	Scotland
Christian Townsend	Fly-half	Scotland
Michael Gray	Centre	Scotland
Robbie McCallum	Centre	Scotland
Finlay Callaghan	Wing	Scotland
Ross McKnight	Wing	Scotland

==== Edinburgh ====
Note: Flags indicate national union under World Rugby eligibility rules. Players may hold more than one non-World Rugby nationality.

Player	Position	Union
Dan Gamble	Prop	Scotland
Michael Jones	Prop	Scotland
Cole Lamberton	Prop	Scotland
Patrick Harrison	Hooker	Scotland
Jamie Campbell	Flanker	Scotland
Harri Morris	Flanker	Scotland
Rudi Brown	Flanker	Scotland

Player	Position	Union
Roan Frostwick	Scrum-half	Scotland
Matt Russell	Fly-half	Scotland
Cameron Scott	Fly-half	Scotland
Matt Currie	Centre	Scotland
Ben Evans	Wing	Scotland
Jacob Henry	Wing	Scotland
Harry Paterson	Fullback	Scotland
Nathan Sweeney	Fullback	Scotland

=== Super 6 intake ===
==== Ayrshire Bulls ====
Note: Flags indicate national union under World Rugby eligibility rules. Players may hold more than one non-World Rugby nationality.

Player	Position	Union
Jamie Drummond	Hooker	Scotland
Alex Samuel	Lock	Scotland
Rory Jackson	Flanker	Scotland

Player	Position	Union
Christian Townsend	Fly-half	Scotland
Finlay Callaghan	Wing	Scotland

==== Boroughmuir Bears ====
Note: Flags indicate national union under World Rugby eligibility rules. Players may hold more than one non-World Rugby nationality.

Player	Position	Union
Euan Ferrie	Lock	Scotland
Gregor Brown	Flanker	Scotland
Rhys Tait	Flanker	Scotland

Player	Position	Union
Robbie McCallum	Centre	Scotland
Michael Gray	Centre	Scotland

==== Heriots Rugby ====
Note: Flags indicate national union under World Rugby eligibility rules. Players may hold more than one non-World Rugby nationality.

Player	Position	Union
Dan Gamble	Prop	Scotland
Michael Jones	Prop	Scotland
Jamie Campbell	Flanker	Scotland

Player	Position	Union
Matt Russell	Fly-half	Scotland
Ben Evans	Wing	Scotland

==== Southern Knights ====
Note: Flags indicate national union under World Rugby eligibility rules. Players may hold more than one non-World Rugby nationality.

Player	Position	Union
Patrick Harrison	Hooker	Scotland
Harri Morris	Flanker	Scotland

Player	Position	Union
Cameron Scott	Fly-half	Scotland
Jacob Henry	Wing	Scotland
Nathan Sweeney	Fullback	Scotland

==== Stirling County ====
Note: Flags indicate national union under World Rugby eligibility rules. Players may hold more than one non-World Rugby nationality.

Player	Position	Union
Murphy Walker	Prop	Scotland
Angus Fraser	Hooker	Scotland
Max Williamson	Lock	Scotland

Player	Position	Union
Euan Cunningham	Fly-half	Scotland
Ross McKnight	Wing	Scotland

==== Watsonians ====
Note: Flags indicate national union under World Rugby eligibility rules. Players may hold more than one non-World Rugby nationality.

Player	Position	Union
Cole Lamberton	Prop	Scotland
Rudi Brown	Flanker	Scotland

Player	Position	Union
Roan Frostwick	Scrum-half	Scotland
Matt Currie	Centre	Scotland
Harry Paterson	Fullback	Scotland

=== Supported players ===
The inductees for the 2021–22 season are split into their regional academies. The male players are still in Stage 1 and Stage 2 of the academy and not yet deemed professional players. The women named, however, may be international players, using the academy for support. Stage 1 and Stage 2 players have yet to be announced for the 2021–22 season.

== Graduates of this year ==
None as yet.
