= 2017–18 Scottish Rugby Academy season =

Scottish Rugby Academy 2017 / 2018

The Scottish Rugby Academy provides Scotland's up and coming rugby stars a dedicated focused routeway for development into the professional game. Entry is restricted to Scottish qualified students and both male and female entrants are accepted into 4 regional academies. The 2017–18 season sees the third year of the academy.

== Season overview ==
This was the third year of the Scottish Rugby Academy. 11 players were signed from the academy into full-time professional clubs from last season's Stage 3.

This year sees 8 new entrants into the academy going straight into Stage 3 - being assigned to a professional club. In addition, another 9 players have been promoted to Stage 3 from Stage 2.

The latest intake of players demonstrates our continued investment in the next generation, an increased input from the pro teams in their selection and our commitment to future-proof our game in Scotland.

— Stephen Gemmell, Head of Academy and Performance Programmes.

A second intake of players into this year's academy at Stage 1 and 2 will be announced after July and August after the regional age-grade series ends.

== Regional Academies ==
The Scottish Rugby Academy runs four regional academies in Scotland:-

- Glasgow and the West
- Borders and East Lothian
- Edinburgh
- Caledonia

These geographically roughly correspond to the traditional districts of Glasgow District, South, Edinburgh District and North and Midlands.

== Players and stages ==
Players are selected in three stages:-

- Stage 1 - Regionally selected and regionally supported players
- Stage 2 - Nationally selected and regionally supported players
- Stage 3 - Nationally selected and regionally supported players assigned to a professional team.

=== Stage 3 players ===
Stage 3 players are assigned to a professional team.

Nominally, for the men, Glasgow Warriors receive the Stage 3 players of Glasgow and the West and Caledonia regions, while Edinburgh Rugby receive the Stage 3 players of the Edinburgh and Borders and East Lothian regions.

The women are integrated into the Scotland women's national rugby sevens team and the Scotland women's national rugby union team.

==== Borders and East Lothian ====
Note: Flags indicate national union under World Rugby eligibility rules. Players may hold more than one non-World Rugby nationality.

Player / Position / Union; Fraser Renwick / Hooker / Scotland	Player / Position / Union; Gary Munro / Scrum-half / Scotland

==== Caledonia ====
Note: these players, originally noted as Caledonia regional academy Stage 3 players were later formally assigned to the Glasgow regional academy when the Scottish Rugby Academy completed their second academy intake of the season.

Note: Flags indicate national union under World Rugby eligibility rules. Players may hold more than one non-World Rugby nationality.

Player	Position	Union
Euan McLaren	Prop	Scotland
Hamilton Burr	Lock	Scotland

Player	Position	Union
Kaleem Barreto	Scrum-half	Scotland

==== Edinburgh ====
Duncan Ferguson, Chloe Rollie, Lisa Thomson and Sarah Law were added to the Edinburgh Stage 3 academy squad in the Scottish Rugby Academy's second intake in the 2017–18 season.

Note: Flags indicate national union under World Rugby eligibility rules. Players may hold more than one non-World Rugby nationality.

Player	Position	Union
Ross Dunbar	Prop	Scotland
Duncan Ferguson	Prop	Scotland
Dan Winning	Prop	Scotland
Hamish Bain	Lock	Scotland
Archie Erskine	Lock	Scotland
Jamie Ure	Lock	Scotland
Thomas Gordon	Flanker	Scotland
Luke Crosbie	Flanker	Scotland

Player	Position	Union
Sarah Law	Scrum-half	Scotland
Charlie Shiel	Scrum-half	Scotland
Jason Baggott	Fly-half	Scotland
Cammy Hutchison	Centre	Scotland
George Taylor	Centre	Scotland
Lisa Thomson	Centre	Scotland
Ross McCann	Wing	Scotland
Chloe Rollie	Fullback	Scotland

==== Glasgow and the West ====
Dan York was added to the Glasgow Stage 3 academy squad in the Scottish Rugby Academy's second intake in the 2017–18 season.

Note: Flags indicate national union under World Rugby eligibility rules. Players may hold more than one non-World Rugby nationality.

Player	Position	Union
Robbie Smith	Hooker	Scotland
Grant Stewart	Hooker	Scotland
Adam Nicol	Prop	Scotland
Dan York	Prop	Scotland
Bruce Flockhart	Flanker	Scotland
George Stokes	Flanker	Scotland
Matt Fagerson	Number 8	Scotland
Jade Konkel	Number 8	Scotland

Player	Position	Union
Josh Henderson	Fly-half	Scotland
Stafford McDowell	Centre	Scotland
Robbie Nairn	Wing	Scotland
Sam Yawayawa	Wing	Scotland

=== Stage 1 and 2 players ===
The inductees for the 2017–18 season are split into their regional academies.

==== Borders and East Lothian ====
Adam Hall was transferred to the Edinburgh regional academy in the second intake.

- Patrick Anderson Stage 1/2 Melrose RFC
- Thomas Brown Stage 1/2 Melrose RFC
- Kyle Brunton Stage 1/2 Hawick RFC
- Rory Darge Stage 1/2 North Berwick RFC
- Anna Forsyth Stage 1/2 Gala Vixens
- Roan Frostwick Stage 1/2 North Berwick RFC
- Adam Hall Stage 1/2 Melrose RFC
- Lauren Harris Stage 1/2 Melrose Ladies
- Robbie McCallum Stage 1/2 Loretto School
- Finlay Scott Stage 1/2 Jed-Forest

New additions in the second intake:

- Thomas Jeffrey (Peebles)
- Matthew Kindness (Kelso)
- Scott King (Preston Lodge HS/RFC)
- William Owen (Melrose)
- Lana Skeldon (Watsonians)
- Gemma Stoddart (Watsonians)
- Mak Wilson (Duns)

==== Caledonia ====
Fergus Bradbury was on the initial list of Caledonia academy players but not on the second intake list. George Goodenough and Andrew McLean were transferred to the Edinburgh academy in the second intake. Grant Hughes was transferred to the Glasgow academy in the second intake. Cameron Henderson (Strathallan School) is added to the Caledonia list.

- Fergus Bradbury Stage 1/2 Stirling University
- Karen Dunbar Stage 1/2 RHC Cougars
- Angus Fraser Stage 1/2 High School of Dundee
- George Goodenough Stage 1/2 Strathallan School (Fly-half)
- Caitlan Harvey Stage 1/2 Caithness RFC (Wing)
- Grant Hughes Stage 1/2 Dollar Academy
- Megan Kennedy Stage 1/2 Stirling County (Prop)
- Andrew McLean Stage 1/2 Stirling County
- Lucy Park Stage 1/2 Murrayfield Wanderers RFC (Openside flanker)
- Logan Trotter Stage 1/2 Stirling County
- Emma Wassell Stage 1/2 Murrayfield Wanderers RFC (Lock)

New additions in the second intake:

- Jacob Henry (Highland/Dingwall Academy)
- Ollie Smith (Strathallan School)
- Murphy Walker (Strathallan School)

==== Edinburgh ====
Chloe Rollie, Lisa Thomson and Sarah Law were initially named as Stage 2 but were promoted to Stage 3 in the second intake. They are now listed with the Stage 3 players. Charlie Jupp (unattached) and James Miller (Watsonians) are added to the Edinburgh list.

- Callum Atkinson Stage 1/2 Boroughmuir
- Shaun Gunn Stage 1/2 Edinburgh Academicals
- Fin Hobbis Stage 1/2 Stewarts Melville
- Jamie Hodgson Stage 1/2 Stewarts Melville
- Nicola Howat Stage 1/2 Edinburgh University RFC
- Rhona Lloyd Stage 1/2 Edinburgh University
- Lisa Martin Stage 1/2 Murrayfield Wanderers RFC
- Helen Nelson Stage 1/2 Murrayfield Wanderers RFC
- Dean Roger Stage 1/2 Edinburgh Academicals
- Eilidh Sinclair Stage 1/2 Murrayfield Wanderers RFC (Wing)

New additions in the second intake:

- Jack Blain (Stewart's Melville College)
- Connor Boyle (Stewart's Melville College)
- Jamie Dobie (Merchiston Castle School)
- Dan Gamble (Merchiston Castle School)

==== Glasgow and the West ====
Dan York was initially named as Stage 2 but was promoted to Stage 3 in the second intake. He is now listed with the Stage 3 players.

- Scott Bell Stage 1/2 Glasgow Hawks
- Paul Cairncross Stage 1/2 East Kilbride RFC (Hooker)
- Ross Jackson Stage 1/2 Biggar RFC
- Andrew Jardine Stage 1/2 Biggar RFC
- Guy Kelly Stage 1/2 Biggar RFC
- Mhairi McDonald Stage 1/2 Hillhead Jordanhill RFC
- Louise McMillan Stage 1/2 Hillhead Jordanhill RFC
- Andrew Nimmo Stage 1/2 Biggar RFC
- Craig Pringle Stage 1/2 Stirling County
- Kirsty Reid Stage 1/2 Hillhead Jordanhill
- Bruce Sorbie Stage 1/2 Stirling County
- Gavin Wilson Stage 1/2 Dumfries Saints

New additions in the second intake:

- Scott Clelland (Prestwick Academy/Ayr)
- Paddy Dewhurst (Ayr)
- Murray Godsman (High School of Glasgow/Glasgow Hawks)
- Rory Jackson (Kelvinside Academy)
- Luhann Kotze (Biggar HS/RFC)
- Ross Thompson (Glasgow Hawks)

== Graduates of this year ==
Players who have signed professional contracts with clubs:

- (Scotland) Matt Fagerson to (Scotland) Glasgow Warriors
- (Scotland) Robert Beattie to (Scotland) Glasgow Warriors
- (Scotland) Robbie Nairn to (Scotland) Glasgow Warriors
- (Scotland) Adam Nicol to (Scotland) Glasgow Warriors
- (Scotland) Bruce Flockhart to (Scotland) Glasgow Warriors
- Josh Henderson to Scotland 7s
- Ross McCann to Scotland 7s
- (Scotland) Jason Baggott to (Scotland) Edinburgh
- (Scotland) Luke Crosbie to (Scotland) Edinburgh
- (Scotland) Archie Erskine to (Scotland) Edinburgh
- (Scotland) Cameron Fenton to (Scotland) Edinburgh
- (Scotland) Charlie Shiel to (Scotland) Edinburgh
- (Scotland) George Taylor to (Scotland) Edinburgh
