= 2025 Scotland rugby union tour of Fiji and New Zealand =

- Date: 2–16 July 2022
- Coach: Gregor Townsend
- Tour captain: Rory Darge
Summary
P	W	D	L
Total
3	2	0	1
Test match
2	1	0	1
Opponent
P	W	D	L
Māori All Blacks
1	1	0	0
Fiji
1	0	0	1
Samoa
1	1	0	0

Tour chronology
- ← Canada, Chile, United States & Uruguay 2024

In July 2025 the Scotland rugby union team toured Fiji and New Zealand.

It was the first time since the 2011 Rugby World Cup Scotland have played in New Zealand, with a match against the Māori All Blacks; their first meeting since 2000, and a neutral venue match against Samoa who they last played in a mid-year international in 2013. Scotland also traveled to Fiji, taking on the Flying Fijians in Suva, where they last played in 2017.

Ahead of the tour, opposition sides Māori All Blacks played against a Japan XV side, winning 53–20, and Fiji will play Australia.

== Fixtures ==
Date and time		Venue	Home	Score	Away
5 July 2025	15:35 NZST (UTC+12)	Okara Park, Whangārei	Māori All Blacks	26–29	Scotland
12 July 2025	15:00 FJT (UTC+12)	HFC Bank Stadium, Suva	Fiji	29–14	Scotland
18 July 2025	20:05 NZST (UTC+12)	Eden Park, Auckland, New Zealand	Samoa	12–41	Scotland

== Matches ==
=== Māori All Blacks ===
5 July 2025
15:35 NZST (UTC+12)

Māori All Blacks	26–29	Scotland
Try: Nock 1' m Walker-Leawere 31' c Eklund 57' c Wrampling 67' c Con: Reihana (2/3) 32', 58'; Trask (1/1) 68'	Report	Try: Paterson 11' c Horne (2) 24' c, 53' m Reed 40' c Con: Hastings (3/4) 12', 25', 40'; Pen: Hastings (1/1) 16'

Okara Park, Whangārei
Attendance: 10,150
Referee: Nika Amashukeli (Georgia)

FB	15	Zarn Sullivan
RW	14	Cole Forbes		(substituted off) 58'
OC	13	Bailyn Sullivan	(yellow card) 47'
IC	12	Gideon Wrampling
LW	11	Daniel Rona
FH	10	Rivez Reihana		(substituted off) 58'	(substituted in) 66'
SH	9	Sam Nock		(substituted off) 70'
N8	8	Cullen Grace
OF	7	Jahrome Brown		(substituted off) 68'
BF	6	TK Howden	(yellow card) 44'
RL	5	Isaia Walker-Leawere
LL	4	Antonio Shalfoon		(substituted off) 54'
TP	3	Kershawl Sykes-Martin		(substituted off) 54'
HK	2	Kurt Eklund (c)		(substituted off) 64'
LP	1	Jared Proffit		(substituted off) 54'
Substitutions:
HK	16	Jacob Devery		(substituted in) 64'
PR	17	Pouri Rakete-Stones		(substituted in) 54'
PR	18	Benet Kumeroa		(substituted in) 54'
LK	19	Laghlan McWhannell		(substituted in) 54'
FL	20	Caleb Delany		(substituted in) 68'
SH	21	Kemara Hauiti-Parapara		(substituted in) 70'
FH	22	Kaleb Trask		(substituted in) 58'	(substituted off) 66'
CE	23	Corey Evans		(substituted in) 58'
Coach:
(New Zealand) Ross Filipo

FB	15	Ollie Smith
RW	14	Harry Paterson
OC	13	Rory Hutchinson
IC	12	Stafford McDowall (c)
LW	11	Arron Reed
FH	10	Adam Hastings		(substituted off) 63'
SH	9	George Horne		(substituted off) 63'
N8	8	Ben Muncaster		(substituted off) 29'
OF	7	Andy Onyeama-Christie		(substituted off) 70'
BF	6	Josh Bayliss
RL	5	Cameron Henderson	(yellow card) 80'
LL	4	Marshall Sykes		(substituted off) 51'
TP	3	Fin Richardson		(substituted off) 51'
HK	2	Patrick Harrison		(substituted off) 51'
LP	1	Nathan McBeth		(substituted off) 51'
Substitutions:
HK	16	George Turner		(substituted in) 51'
PR	17	Alec Hepburn		(substituted in) 51'
PR	18	Will Hurd		(substituted in) 51'
LK	19	Max Williamson		(substituted in) 51'
LK	20	Gregor Brown		(substituted in) 70'
FL	21	Alex Masibaka	(yellow card) 31'	(substituted in) 29'
FH	22	Fergus Burke		(substituted in) 63'
SH	23	Jamie Dobie		(substituted in) 63'
Coach:
(Scotland) Gregor Townsend

Assistant referees:
Jordan Way (Australia)
Matt Kellahan (Australia)
Television match official:
Oli Kellett (Australia)

Notes:

- This was Scotland's first win over the Māori All Blacks.

=== Fiji ===
12 July 2025
15:00 FJT (UTC+12)

Fiji	29–14	Scotland
Try: Ikanivere 36' m Ravouvou 40' c Wainiqolo 59' c Penalty try 67'; Con: Muntz (2/3) 40+1', 60'; Pen: Muntz (1/1) 21'	Report	Try: Rowe 3' c Jordan 44' c Con: Burke (2/2) 4', 45'

HFC Bank Stadium, Suva
Attendance: 10,000
Referee: Ben O'Keeffe (New Zealand)

FB	15	Salesi Rayasi	(substituted off) 55'
RW	14	Kalaveti Ravouvou
OC	13	Sireli Maqala
IC	12	Josua Tuisova	(substituted off) 66'
LW	11	Jiuta Wainiqolo
FH	10	Caleb Muntz
SH	9	Simione Kuruvoli	(substituted off) 72'
N8	8	Viliame Mata	(substituted off) 67'
OF	7	Elia Canakaivata
BF	6	Lekima Tagitagivalu
RL	5	Temo Mayanavanua
LL	4	Isoa Nasilasila	(substituted off) 67'
TP	3	Mesake Doge	(substituted off) 51'
HK	2	Tevita Ikanivere (c)	(substituted off) 55'
LP	1	Eroni Mawi	(substituted off) 55'
Substitutions:
HK	16	Sam Matavesi	(substituted in) 55'
PR	17	Haereiti Hetet	(substituted in) 55'
PR	18	Samu Tawake	(substituted in) 51'
LK	19	Mesake Vocevoce	(substituted in) 67'
N8	20	Albert Tuisue	(substituted in) 67'
SH	21	Sam Wye	(substituted in) 72'
FH	22	Isaiah Armstrong-Ravula	(substituted in) 55'
FB	23	Vilimoni Botitu
Coach:
(Australia) Mick Byrne

FB	15	Kyle Rowe
RW	14	Darcy Graham	(yellow card) 33' (red card) 67'
OC	13	Cameron Redpath		(substituted off) 55'
IC	12	Tom Jordan
LW	11	Kyle Steyn
FH	10	Fergus Burke
SH	9	Jamie Dobie		(substituted off) 58'
N8	8	Matt Fagerson		(substituted off) 72'
OF	7	Rory Darge (c)
BF	6	Jamie Ritchie		(substituted off) 22'
RL	5	Grant Gilchrist
LL	4	Marshall Sykes		(substituted off) 56'
TP	3	Elliot Millar-Mills		(substituted off) 58'
HK	2	Ewan Ashman	(yellow card) 10'	(substituted off) 58'
LP	1	Rory Sutherland		(substituted off) 57'
Substitutions:
HK	16	George Turner		(substituted in) 58'
PR	17	Alec Hepburn		(substituted in) 57'
PR	18	Will Hurd		(substituted in) 58'
LK	19	Max Williamson		(substituted in) 56'
FL	20	Josh Bayliss		(substituted in) 22'
SH	21	George Horne		(substituted in) 58'
FH	22	Adam Hastings		(substituted in) 72'
FB	23	Ollie Smith		(substituted in) 55'
Coach:
(Scotland) Gregor Townsend

Assistant referees:
Jordan Way (Australia)
Matt Kellahan (Australia)
Television match official:
Richard Kelly (New Zealand)

Notes:

- Sam Wye (Fiji) and Fergus Burke (Scotland) made their international debuts.

=== Samoa ===
18 July 2025
19:35 NZST (UTC+12)

Samoa	12–41	Scotland
Try: Nee-Nee 50' m Paia’aua 64' c Con: Umaga (1/2) 65'	Report	Try: Ashman 8' m Hutchinson 13' c Reed 31' m Steyn 36' m Gilchrist 45' c Rowe 55' m Turner 77' c Con: Burke (1/4) 14'; Horne (2/3) 46', 78'

Eden Park, Auckland (New Zealand)
Attendance: 15,000
Referee: Jordan Way (Australia)

FB	15	Latrell Smiler-Ah Kiong	(substituted off) 53'
RW	14	Tuna Tuitama
OC	13	Duncan Paia’aua
IC	12	Henry Taefu
LW	11	Tomasi Alosio
FH	10	Jacob Umaga
SH	9	Melani Matavao	(substituted off) 69'
N8	8	Taleni Seu	(substituted off) 46'
OF	7	Jonah Mau'u	(substituted off) 46'
BF	6	Theo McFarland (c)
RL	5	Sam Slade	(substituted off) 65'
LL	4	Ben Nee-Nee
TP	3	Michael Alaalatoa	(substituted off) 61'
HK	2	Pita Anae Ah-Sue	(substituted off) 52'
LP	1	Aki Seiuli	(substituted off) 73'
Substitutions:
HK	16	Luteru Tolai	(substituted in) 52'
PR	17	Kaynan Siteine-Tua	(substituted in) 73'
PR	18	Marco Fepulea'i	(substituted in) 61'
LK	19	Michael Curry	(substituted in) 65'
FL	20	Niko Jones	(substituted in) 46'
FL	21	Iakopo Mapu	(substituted in) 46'
SH	22	Connor Tupai	(substituted in) 69'
FH	23	Rodney Iona	(substituted in) 53'
Coach:
(Samoa) Tusi Pisi

FB	15	Kyle Rowe
RW	14	Kyle Steyn	(substituted off) 40'
OC	13	Rory Hutchinson
IC	12	Stafford McDowall
LW	11	Arron Reed
FH	10	Fergus Burke	(substituted off) 59'
SH	9	Jamie Dobie	(substituted off) 74'
N8	8	Matt Fagerson
OF	7	Rory Darge (c)	(substituted off) 56'
BF	6	Andy Onyeama-Christie
RL	5	Grant Gilchrist
LL	4	Gregor Brown	(substituted off) 56'
TP	3	Elliot Millar-Mills	(substituted off) 56'
HK	2	Ewan Ashman	(substituted off) 40'
LP	1	Rory Sutherland	(substituted off) 40'
Substitutions:
HK	16	George Turner	(substituted in) 40'
PR	17	Nathan McBeth	(substituted in) 40'
PR	18	Fin Richardson	(substituted in) 56'
LK	19	Cameron Henderson	(substituted in) 56'
LK	20	Marshall Sykes	(substituted in) 74'
FL	21	Ben Muncaster	(substituted in) 56'
SH	22	George Horne	(substituted in) 40'
FH	23	Adam Hastings	(substituted in) 59'
Coach:
(Scotland) Gregor Townsend

Assistant referees:
Nic Berry (Australia)
Tevita Rokovereni (Fiji)
Television match official:
Marius Jonker (South Africa)

Notes:

- Pita Anae Ah-Sue, Niko Jones, Kaynan Siteine-Tua, Latrell Smiler-Ah Kiong, Connor Tupai and Jacob Umaga (all Samoa) and Fin Richardson (Scotland) made their international debuts.

== Squad ==
With eight players named in the British & Irish Lions squad for their tour to Australia, Gregor Townsend named a 37-player squad ahead of their tour.

On 30 June, Ben White was called up to the British and Irish Lions and was replaced by Gus Warr on the Scotland tour.

- Ages and caps updated at the start of the tour.

Player	Position	Date of birth (age)	Caps	Club/province
Ewan Ashman	Hooker	3 April 2000 (aged 25)	27	(Scotland) Edinburgh
Patrick Harrison	Hooker	20 June 2002 (aged 23)	3	(Scotland) Edinburgh
George Turner	Hooker	10 August 1992 (aged 32)	45	(Japan) Kobelco Kobe Steelers
Alec Hepburn	Prop	30 March 1993 (aged 32)	4	(Wales) Scarlets
Will Hurd	Prop	29 June 1999 (aged 26)	8	(Scotland) Leicester Tigers
Nathan McBeth	Prop	8 June 1998 (aged 27)	2	(Scotland) Glasgow Warriors
Elliot Millar-Mills	Prop	8 July 1992 (aged 32)	7	(England) Northampton Saints
Fin Richardson	Prop	16 September 1998 (aged 26)	0	(Scotland) Glasgow Warriors
Rory Sutherland	Prop	24 August 1992 (aged 32)	41	(Scotland) Glasgow Warriors
Gregor Brown	Lock	1 July 2001 (aged 24)	9	(Scotland) Glasgow Warriors
Grant Gilchrist	Lock	9 August 1990 (aged 34)	80	(Scotland) Edinburgh
Cameron Henderson	Lock	13 January 2000 (aged 25)	1	(England) Leicester Tigers
Marshall Sykes	Lock	29 December 1999 (aged 25)	2	(Scotland) Edinburgh
Max Williamson	Lock	5 August 2002 (aged 22)	6	(Scotland) Glasgow Warriors
Josh Bayliss	Back row	18 September 1997 (aged 27)	10	(England) Bath
Rory Darge (c)	Back row	23 February 2000 (aged 25)	30	(Scotland) Glasgow Warriors
Matt Fagerson	Back row	16 July 1998 (aged 26)	55	(Scotland) Glasgow Warriors
Alex Masibaka	Back row	9 August 2001 (aged 23)	0	(France) Soyaux Angoulême
Ben Muncaster	Back row	14 October 2001 (aged 23)	2	(Scotland) Edinburgh
Andy Onyeama-Christie	Back row	22 March 1999 (aged 26)	8	(England) Saracens
Jamie Ritchie	Back row	16 August 1996 (aged 28)	59	(Scotland) Edinburgh
Jamie Dobie	Scrum-half	7 June 2001 (aged 24)	12	(Scotland) Glasgow Warriors
George Horne	Scrum-half	12 May 1995 (aged 30)	36	(Scotland) Glasgow Warriors
Gus Warr	Scrum-half	24 September 1999 (aged 25)	2	(England) Sale Sharks
Fergus Burke	Fly-half	3 September 1999 (aged 25)	0	(England) Saracens
Adam Hastings	Fly-half	5 October 1996 (aged 28)	32	(Scotland) Glasgow Warriors
Matt Currie	Centre	22 February 2001 (aged 24)	4	(Scotland) Edinburgh
Tom Jordan	Centre	18 September 1998 (aged 26)	8	(Scotland) Glasgow Warriors
Stafford McDowall	Centre	24 February 1998 (aged 27)	13	(Scotland) Glasgow Warriors
Cameron Redpath	Centre	23 December 1999 (aged 25)	14	(England) Bath
Darcy Graham	Wing	21 June 1997 (aged 28)	46	(Scotland) Edinburgh
Arron Reed	Wing	10 July 1999 (aged 25)	3	(England) Sale Sharks
Kyle Rowe	Wing	8 February 1998 (aged 27)	12	(Scotland) Glasgow Warriors
Kyle Steyn	Wing	29 January 1994 (aged 31)	23	(Scotland) Glasgow Warriors
Harry Paterson	Fullback	28 June 2001 (aged 24)	3	(Scotland) Edinburgh
Ollie Smith	Fullback	7 August 2000 (aged 24)	9	(Scotland) Glasgow Warriors

== See also ==
- 2025 mid-year rugby union tests
