= 2024–25 Edinburgh Rugby season =

Edinburgh Rugby
- Full name: Edinburgh Rugby
- Union: SRU (Scotland)
- Founded: 1872; 154 years ago
- Location: Edinburgh, Scotland
- Ground(s): Hive Stadium (Capacity 7,800); Murrayfield Stadium
- CEO: Douglas Struth
- Coach: Sean Everitt
- Captain(s): Grant Gilchrist; Ben Vellacott
- League(s): United Rugby Championship; EPRC Challenge Cup; 1872 Cup
- 2023–24: League: 10th Playoffs: DNQ
1st kit	2nd kit

Official website
- edinburghrugby.org
- Current season

The 2024–25 season is Edinburgh's fourth season in the United Rugby Championship, their 31st season of professional rugby. Along with competing in the URC and its Scottish-Italian Shield competition, the club will also participate in the 2024-25 European Rugby Challenge Cup and the 1872 Cup.

Edinburgh Rugby drew an average home attendance of 10,535 in the 2024-25 URC season.

== Coaching staff ==
- Head coach: Sean Everitt
- Assistant skills coach: Robert Chrystie
- Forwards coach: Stevie Lawrie
- Defence coach: Michael Todd
- Attack and backs coach: Scott Mathie

== 2024–25 squad ==
Edinburgh Rugby United Rugby Championship squad (Note: Taking into account signings and departures head of 2023–24 season as listed on List of 2023–24 United Rugby Championship transfers.)
**Props**: (England) **Paul Hill**; (Scotland) Robin Hislop; (Scotland) **D'Arcy Rae**; (Scotland) **Pierre Schoeman**; (Scotland) **Javan Sebastian**; (South Africa) Boan Venter; (New Zealand) Angus Williams*; **Hookers**: (Scotland) **Ewan Ashman**; (Scotland) **Dave Cherry**; (Scotland) **Patrick Harrison**; **Locks**: (Scotland) Rob Carmichael*; (Scotland) **Grant Gilchrist** (cc); (Scotland) **Jamie Hodgson**; (Scotland) **Sam Skinner**; (Scotland) **Marshall Sykes**; (Scotland) **Glen Young**	**Back row**: (Scotland) **Magnus Bradbury**; (Scotland) Connor Boyle; (Scotland) **Luke Crosbie**; (Scotland) Tom Dodd; (Scotland) **Freddy Douglas**; (Scotland) **Ben Muncaster**; (Scotland) **Jamie Ritchie**; (Scotland) **Hamish Watson**; **Scrum-halves**: (Scotland) **Ali Price**; (Scotland) Charlie Shiel; (Scotland) **Ben Vellacott** (cc); **Fly-halves**: (Scotland) **Ben Healy**; (Scotland) Cammy Scott; (Scotland) **Ross Thompson**	**Centres**: (Scotland) **Mark Bennett**; (Scotland) **Matt Currie**; (Scotland) **James Lang**; (Scotland) **Matt Scott**; (Australia) Mosese Tuipulotu*; **Wings**: (New Zealand) Wes Goosen; (Scotland) **Darcy Graham**; (Scotland) **Ross McCann**; (Scotland) Nathan Sweeney; (Scotland) **Duhan van der Merwe**; **Fullbacks**: (Argentina) **Emiliano Boffelli**; (Scotland) **Damien Hoyland**; (Scotland) **Harry Paterson**
(cc) denotes the team co-captains, **Bold** denotes internationally capped players.^{*} denotes players qualified to play for Scotland on residency or dual nationality. ^{ST} denotes a short-term signing. ^{L} denotes a player on loan at the club. Players and their allocated positions from the Edinburgh Rugby website.

=== Academy players ===
Edinburgh Rugby Academy squad (Note: Taking into account signings and departures head of 2024–25 season as listed on List of 2024–25 United Rugby Championship transfers.)
**Props**: (Scotland) Mikey Jones; (Scotland) Ollie Blyth-Lafferty; (Scotland) Jamie Stewart; **Hookers**: (Scotland) Jerry Blyth-Lafferty; (Scotland) Harri Morris; **Locks**: (Scotland) Christian Lindsay; (Scotland) Euan McVie; (Scotland) Mak Rutherford	**Back row**: (Scotland) Tom Currie; (Scotland) Ollie Duncan; (Scotland) Liam McConnell; **Scrum-halves**: (Scotland) Connor McAlpine; (Scotland) Hamish McArthur; (Scotland) Hector Patterson; **Fly-halves**: (England) Isaac Coates; (Scotland) Ross Wolfenden	**Centres**: (Scotland) Jack Hocking; (Scotland) Sam Leweni; (Scotland) Findlay Thomson; **Wings**: (Scotland) Nairn Moncrieff; (Scotland) Lewis Wells; **Fullbacks**: (Scotland) Jack Brown
(c) denotes the team captain, **Bold** denotes internationally capped players.^{*} denotes players qualified to play for Scotland on residency or dual nationality. ^{ST} denotes a short-term signing. Players and their allocated positions from the Edinburgh Rugby website.

== United Rugby Championship ==
=== Main standings ===
Pos	Team	Pld	W	D	L	PF	PA	PD	TF	TA	TB	LB	Pts	Qualification
1	Leinster (CH)	18	16	0	2	542	256	+286	79	35	11	1	76	Qualifies for home URC quarter-final; Qualification for the 2025–26 Champions Cup
2	Bulls (RU)	18	14	0	4	542	361	+181	71	44	9	3	68	Qualifies for home URC quarter-final; Qualification for the 2025–26 Champions Cup
3	Sharks	18	13	0	5	436	402	+34	55	59	7	3	62	Qualifies for home URC quarter-final; Qualification for the 2025–26 Champions Cup
4	Glasgow Warriors	18	11	0	7	468	327	+141	70	40	10	5	59	Qualifies for home URC quarter-final; Qualification for the 2025–26 Champions Cup
5	Stormers	18	10	0	8	507	418	+89	66	57	11	4	55	Qualifies for URC quarter-final; Qualification for the 2025–26 Champions Cup
6	Munster	18	9	0	9	444	429	+15	67	59	11	4	51	Qualifies for URC quarter-final; Qualification for the 2025–26 Champions Cup
7	Edinburgh	18	8	1	9	471	407	+64	66	57	9	6	49	Qualifies for URC quarter-final; Qualification for the 2025–26 Champions Cup
8	Scarlets	18	9	1	8	427	382	+45	50	52	6	4	48	Qualifies for URC quarter-final; Qualification for the 2025–26 Champions Cup
9	Cardiff	18	8	1	9	409	477	−68	63	65	10	3	47	Qualification for the 2025–26 Challenge Cup
10	Benetton	18	9	1	8	393	478	−85	50	65	7	1	46	Qualification for the 2025–26 Challenge Cup
11	Lions	18	8	0	10	402	440	−38	53	60	5	3	40	Qualification for the 2025–26 Challenge Cup
12	Ospreys	18	7	1	10	437	454	−17	60	63	6	4	40	Qualification for the 2025–26 Challenge Cup
13	Connacht	18	6	0	12	420	472	−52	64	62	9	6	39	Qualification for the 2025–26 Challenge Cup
14	Ulster	18	7	0	11	414	506	−92	59	72	5	5	38	Qualification for the 2025–26 Challenge Cup
15	Zebre Parma	18	5	1	12	302	503	−201	38	72	3	4	29	Qualification for the 2025–26 Challenge Cup
16	Dragons	18	1	0	17	335	637	−302	43	92	1	4	9	Qualification for the 2025–26 Challenge Cup

Source: UnitedRugby.com
Rules for classification: Tiebreakers for teams tied on points: 1) Number of matches won 2) The difference between points for and points against 3) The number of tries scored 4) The most points scored 5) The difference between tries for and tries against 6) The fewest red cards received 7) The fewest yellow cards received.

=== Round 1 ===
20 September 2024
19:35

(2 BP) Edinburgh (Scotland)	31–33	(Ireland) Leinster (1 BP)
Try: Schoeman 11' c van der Merwe (2) 32' m, 66' m Cherry 42' c M. Scott 80' c Con: Thompson (2/3) 11', 43'; Healy 81' (1/2)		Try: T. O'Brien 15' m Tector 26' c Larmour 46' c Gibson-Park 53' c Conan 56' c Con: Prendergast (4/5) 27', 47', 54', 58'

Hive Stadium, Edinburgh
Attendance: 7,774
Referee: Andrea Piardi (Italy)

=== Round 2 ===
28 September 2024
15:00

Bulls (South Africa)	22–16	(Scotland) Edinburgh (1 BP)
Try: Kirsten 29' c van der Walt 32' m Moodie 63' c Con: van der Walt (1/2) 29'; Chamberlain (1/1) 65'; Pen: Chamberlain (1/1) 68'		Try: Ashman 38' c Con: Thompson (1/1) 40'; Pen: Thompson (3/3) 14', 47', 74'

Loftus Versfeld Stadium, Pretoria
Attendance: 5,500
Referee: Ben Breakspear (Wales)

=== Round 3 ===
5 October 2024
13:45

(1 BP) Lions (South Africa)	55–21	(Scotland) Edinburgh
Try: Q. Horn 5' m Maxwane (3) 12' c, 31' c, 71' c van der Merwe (2) 20' c, 39' c Jonker 26' c F. Horn 35' m Con: Wolhuter (4/5) 13', 21', 27', 31'; Nohamba (2/3) 40', 73'; Pen: Wolhuter (1/1) 2'		Try: Gilchrist 44' c Harrison 50' c Muncaster 66' c Con: Healy (2/2) 44', 51'; Ross Thompson (1/1) 67'

Ellis Park Stadium, Johannesburg
Attendance: 3,542
Referee: Adam Jones (Wales)

=== Round 4 ===
12 October 2024
17:15

(1 BP) Edinburgh (Scotland)	38–7	(South Africa) Stormers
Try: Harrison 18' c Muncaster (2) 21' c, 79' c Graham 58' c Gilchrist 62' c Con: Thompson (4/4) 19', 22', 58', 63'; C. Scott (1/1) 80'; Pen: Thompson (1) 74'		Try: Nel 31' c Con: Willemse 32' (1/1)

Hive Stadium, Edinburgh
Attendance: 6,914
Referee: Ben Whitehouse (Wales)

=== Round 5 ===
19 October 2024
17:15

(1 BP) Edinburgh (Scotland)	27–8	(Wales) Cardiff
Try: van der Merwe 45' c Schoeman 61' m Graham 64' m Ashman 78' c Con: Thompson (2/4) 46', 79'; Pen: Thompson 6'		Try: Young 28' m Pen: Sheedy 57'

Hive Stadium, Edinburgh
Attendance: 6,507
Referee: Morné Ferreira, South Africa

=== Round 6 ===
26 October 2024
15:00

Ospreys (Wales)	22–13	(Scotland) Edinburgh
Try: Lake 3' c Thomas 52' m Parry 74' c Con: O. Williams (2/3) 5', 75'; Pen: O. Williams 59'		Try: Vellacott 22' c Con: Thompson (1/1) 22'; Pen: Thompson (2) 16', 65'

Brewery Field, Bridgend
Attendance: 3,294
Referee: Griffin Colby, South Africa

=== Round 7 ===
30 November 2024
19:35

(1 BP) Edinburgh (Scotland)	50–33	(Italy) Benetton (1 BP)
Try: van der Merwe 1' c Muncaster (2) 14' c, 74' c Bradbury (2) 19' c, 23' c Hill 42' c Price 56' m Con: Thompson (5/6) 2', 15', 20', 24', 42'; Healy 75'; Pen: Healy 80'		Try: Odogwu 42' m Creevy (2) 47' c, 53' c Izekor 62' c Fekitoa 69' c Con: Umaga (4/5) 48', 54', 63', 70'; Pen: Fekitoa 80'

Hive Stadium, Edinburgh
Attendance: 6,057
Referee: Ben Breakspear (Wales)

=== Round 8 ===
22 December 2024
15:00

(1 BP) Glasgow Warriors (Scotland)	33–14	(Scotland) Edinburgh
Try: Matthews (2) 05' c, 26' c Jones 12' c Steyn 41' m Dobie 63' c Con: Horne (4/5) 07', 13', 27', 65'		Try: Venter (2) 74', 78'; Con: Healy (2/2) 74', 78'

Hampden Park, Glasgow
Attendance: 27,538

=== Round 9 ===
28 December 2024
15:00

Edinburgh (Scotland)	10–7	(Scotland) Glasgow Warriors (1 BP)
Try: Schoeman 69' c Con: Healy (1/1) 71'; Pen: Thompson 22'	Report	Try: penalty try 67'

Murrayfield Stadium, Edinburgh
Attendance: 40,063
Referee: Eoghan Cross (Republic of Ireland)

=== Round 10 ===
25 January 2025
15:00

Scarlets (Wales)	30–24	(Scotland) Edinburgh
Try: van der Merwe 24' c Macleod 46' c Nicholas 59' c Con: Lloyd (3/3) 24', 47', 60'; Pen: Lloyd (3) 6', 13', 80'		Try: Skinner 30' c Harrison 39' m Healy 69' c Morris 76' m Con: Healy (2/4) 31', 70'

Parc y Scarlets, Llanelli
Attendance: 5,756

=== Round 11 ===
14 February 2025
19:35

(1 BP) Edinburgh (Scotland)	17–22	(Italy) Zebre Parma
Try: McCann 11’ Tuipulotu 55’c Crosbie 68’ Con: Thompson	Report	Try: Trulla 6’ Garcia 24’c di Bartolomeo 63’c Con: da Re (2); Pen: da Re 47'

Hive Stadium, Edinburgh
Attendance: 5,494

=== Round 12 ===
28 February 2025
19:35

(2 BP) Munster (Ireland)	28–34	(Scotland) Edinburgh (1 BP)
Try: Nankivell, 15'c, 51'c O'Connor, 64'c O'Brien, 80'c Con: Burns (3); Butler	Report	Try: Thompson, 23'c Currie, 28'c, 34', 57'; Bradbury, 39'c Con: Thompson (3); Pen: Thompson, 5'

Musgrave Park, Cork
Attendance: 8,800

=== Round 13 ===
22 March 2025	Benetton (Italy)	21–18	(Scotland) Edinburgh (1 BP)	Stadio Monigo, Treviso
16:00	Try: Mendy, 32'; Odogwu, 62'; Pen: Umaga, 6', 36'	Report	Try: McCann, 17'cc Ashman, 48'; Con: Thompson; Pen: Thompson, 29', 43'	Attendance: 4,985

=== Round 14 ===
28 March 2025	(1 BP) Edinburgh (Scotland)	38–5	(Wales) Dragons	Hive Stadium, Edinburgh
19:35	Try: Harrison (2); D Graham; Schoeman; Venter; Currie; Con: Thompson (3); Scott	Report	Con: Wainright	Attendance: 6,240

=== Round 15 ===
18 April 2025	(1 BP) Edinburgh (Scotland)	17–18	(South Africa) Sharks	Hive Stadium, Edinburgh
19:35	Try: Lang, 11'; Ritchie, 27'; Ashman, 47'c Con: Ashamn (1/3) 47'	Report	Try: Fassi, 41'; Mapimpi, 80'; Con: Hendrikse (1/2), 41'; Pen: Hendrikse, 3', 38'	Attendance: 7,774; Referee: Andrew Brace

=== Round 16 ===
25 April 2025	Zebre Parma (Italy)	25–25	(Scotland) Edinburgh	Stadio Sergio Lanfranchi, Parma
20:35	Try: Fusco, 27', 38'; Trulla, 40'; Con: da Re, 29', 42'; Pen: Montemauri, 73', 79'	Report, 2	Try: Venter, 53', 63; Currie. 80'; Con: Thompson, 64'; Scott, 81'; Pen: Thompson, 22', 24'	Attendance: 2,568; Referee: Ben Connor

=== Round 17 ===
10 May 2025	Connacht (Ireland)	21–31	(Scotland) Edinburgh (1 BP)	The Sportsground, Galway
19:35	Try: Finn Treacy, 42', 52'; Con: JJ Hanrahan, 42', 53'		Try: Schoeman, 8'; Watson, 27'; Muncaster, 58'; Con: Thompson, 9', 28'	Attendance: 6,056

=== Round 18 ===
16 May 2025	(1 BP) Edinburgh (Scotland)	47–17	(Ireland) Ulster	Edinburgh Rugby Stadium
19:35	Try: Graham, 9', 74', 81'; Bradbury, 16', 53'; Ashman, 34'; Schoeman, 59'; Con: Thompson, 10', 35', 54', 60'; Healy, 75', 82'	Report, 2	Try: Kok, 29'; Postlethwaite, 73 penalty try	Attendance: 7,989

Edinburgh Rugby qualify for the play-offs.

=== Play-offs ===
==== Bracket ====
Quarter-finals
1	(Ireland) Leinster	33
8	(Wales) Scarlets	21
4	(Scotland) Glasgow Warriors	36
5	(South Africa) Stormers	18
3	(South Africa) Sharks	24 ^{(6)}
6	(Ireland) Munster	24 ^{(4)}
2	(South Africa) Bulls	42
7	(Scotland) Edinburgh	33

Semi-finals
1	(Ireland) Leinster	37
4	(Scotland) Glasgow Warriors	19
2	(South Africa) Bulls	25
3	(South Africa) Sharks	13

Final
1	(Ireland) Leinster	32
2	(South Africa) Bulls	7

==== Quarter-final ====
31 May 2025	Bulls (South Africa)	42–33	(Scotland) Edinburgh	Loftus Versfeld Stadium, Pretoria
12:30pm	Try: Hanekom, 19'; Kriel, 32'; Vorster, 37'; Moodie, 43'; Johannes, 47'; Nortjé, 52'; Con: Johannes, 44', 48', 53'; Pen: Johannes, 11', 62'; Cards: de Klerk, (yellow card) 3' to 13' v. Heerden, (yellow card) 59' to 69'		Try: Goosen, 5', 64'; Thompson, 14', 29'; Ashman, 59'; Con: Thompson, 6', 15', 30', 60'; Cards: Thompson, (yellow card) 61' to 71'	Attendance: 20,056

Edinburgh are eliminated from the Championship.

== Scottish x Italian Shield ==
=== Standings ===
2024–25 United Rugby Championship Regional Shield Pools
(Italy) (Scotland) Italian x Scottish Shield
	Team	P	W	D	L	PF	PA	PD	TF	TA	TBP	LBP	Pts	Pos overall
1	(Scotland) Glasgow Warriors (S)	6	4	0	2	136	76	+60	20	9	3	1	20	4
2	(Italy) Benetton	6	4	0	2	132	139	–7	19	19	3	0	19	10
3	(Scotland) Edinburgh	6	2	1	3	134	141	–7	18	20	1	2	13	7
4	(Italy) Zebre Parma	6	1	1	4	88	124	–46	9	18	0	1	7	15
If teams are level at any stage, tiebreakers are applied in the following order: 1. number of matches won 2. the difference between points for and points against 3. the number of tries scored 4. the most points scored 5. the difference between tries for and tries against 6. the fewest red cards received 7. the fewest yellow cards received
Green background indicates teams currently leading the regional shield. Upon the conclusion of the regular season, these teams win their respective regional shields. (S) : URC Shield champion

== 1872 Cup ==
Glasgow Warriors won the 2024–25 1872 Cup on aggregate score 40–24, after both teams won their home leg. The total attendance across the two fixtures was 67,601 or 33,800 per leg.

=== Glasgow leg ===
22 December 2024
15:00

Glasgow Warriors (Scotland)	33–14	(Scotland) Edinburgh
Try: Matthews (2) 05' c, 26' c Jones 12' c Steyn 41' m Dobie 63' c Con: Horne (4/5) 07', 13', 27', 65'		Try: Venter (2) 74', 78'; Con: Healy (2/2) 74', 78'

Hampden Park, Glasgow
Attendance: 27,538

=== Edinburgh leg ===
28 December 2024
15:00

Edinburgh (Scotland)	10–7	(Scotland) Glasgow Warriors
Try: Schoeman 69' c Con: Healy (1/1) 71'; Pen: Thompson 22'	Report	Try: penalty try 67'

Murrayfield Stadium, Edinburgh
Attendance: 40,063
Referee: Eoghan Cross (Republic of Ireland)

== European Challenge Cup ==
=== Pool standings ===
EPCR Challenge Cup Pool 3
Pos	Team	Pld	W	D	L	PF	PA	PD	TF	TA	TB	LB	Pts	Qualification
1	(Scotland) Edinburgh (3)	4	3	0	1	127	67	+60	18	9	3	1	16	Home round of 16
2	(France) Bayonne (6)	4	3	0	1	125	101	+24	18	12	2	0	14	Home round of 16
3	(Wales) Scarlets (13)	4	2	0	2	97	94	+3	13	13	2	1	11	Away round of 16
4	(England) Gloucester (15)	4	2	0	2	82	115	−33	12	16	1	0	9	Away round of 16
5	(France) Vannes	4	1	0	3	115	108	+7	14	14	2	2	8	
6	(Georgia (country)) Black Lion	4	1	0	3	71	132	−61	6	17	0	0	4	

Source: EPCR
Rules for classification: Tiebreakers for teams tied on points: 1) Number of matches won; 2) Difference between points for and against; 3) Total number of points for; 4) Aggregate number of points scored in matches between tied teams; 5) Number of matches won excluding the first match, then the second and so on until the tie is settled.

==== Round 1 ====
6 December 2024
20:00

Gloucester (England)	15–10	(Scotland) Edinburgh (1 BP)
Try: Blake 10' c Tuisue 64' m Con: Carreras (1/2) 12'; Pen: Carreras (1/1) 45'	Report	Try: Goosen 36' c Con: Thompson (1/1) 37'; Pen: Healy (1/1) 80'

Kingsholm, Gloucester
Attendance: 9,482
Referee: Ludovic Cayre (France)

==== Round 2 ====
13 December 2024
20:00

(1 BP) Edinburgh (Scotland)	52–12	(France) Bayonne
Try: Currie 10' m Tuipulotu 37' c Graham (2) 45' c, 58' m van der Merwe 50' c Dodd (2) 63' c, 70' c Ritchie 77' c Con: Thompson (3/5) 38', 46', 51'; Healy (3/3) 64', 71', 78'	Report	Try: Martin 42' c Germain 49' m Con: Lopez (1/2) 43'

Edinburgh Rugby Stadium, Edinburgh
Attendance: 5,885
Referee: Morné Ferreira (South Africa)

==== Round 3 ====
11 January 2025
14:00

(1 BP) Vannes (France)	25–29	(Scotland) Edinburgh (1 BP)
Try: Edwards 24' c Taccola 37' c Vili 65' m Con: Lebail (2/2) 25', 37'; Pen: Lebail (2/2) 15', 46'	Report	Try: Goosen 7' m Price (2) 16' c, 28' c van der Merwe 60' c Con: Healy (2/3) 17', 29'; Thompson (1/1) 61'; Pen: Thompson (1/1) 71'

Stade de la Rabine, Vannes
Attendance: 11,792
Referee: Federico Vedovelli (Italy)

==== Round 4 ====
19 January 2025
13:00

(1 BP) Edinburgh (Scotland)	36–15	(Georgia (country)) Black Lion
Try: Skinner 1' c Goosen 23' c Crosbie 28' c Currie 43' c Harrison 49' m Con: Healy (4/5) 1', 24', 29', 44'; Pen: Healy (1/1) 10'	Report	Try: Kvatadze 66' c Aptsiauri 72' m Con: Matkava (1/2) 66'; Pen: Matkava (1/1) 19'

Edinburgh Rugby Stadium, Edinburgh
Attendance: 6,538
Referee: Jeremy Rozier (France)

Round of 16
3	(Scotland) Edinburgh	24
14	(South Africa) Lions	12
6	(France) Bayonne	22
11	(South Africa) Bulls	32
7	(France) Pau	24
10	(England) Bath Rugby	49
2	(France) Montpellier	17
15	(England) Gloucester	24
4	(Wales) Ospreys	36
13	(Wales) Scarlets	14
5	(France) Lyon	34
12	(South Africa) Sharks	21
1	(Ireland) Connacht	35
16	(Wales) Cardiff	20
8	(France) Perpignan	18
9	(France) Racing 92	24

Quarter-finals
3	(Scotland) Edinburgh	34
11	(South Africa) Bulls	28
10	(England) Bath Rugby	61
15	(England) Gloucester	26
4	(Wales) Ospreys	18
5	(France) Lyon	20
1	(Ireland) Connacht	40
9	(France) Racing 92	43

Semi-finals
3	(Scotland) Edinburgh	24
10	(England) Bath Rugby	39
5	(France) Lyon	29
9	(France) Racing 92	15

Final
10	(England) Bath Rugby	37
5	(France) Lyon	12

==== Round of 16 ====
Edinburgh were the third highest seed after the pool stages, guaranteeing home advantage until the semifinals. In the Round of 16, they were drawn against 14th seed Lions.

4 April 2025
20:00

Edinburgh (Scotland) (3)	24–12	(14) (South Africa) Lions
Try: Goosen, 1’ Vellacott, 9’ Ritchie, 28’c Price, 71’c Con: Thompson, 29', 72'	Report:EPRC	Try: Horn 46’ Visagie, 75’c Con: Steyn, 76'

Edinburgh Rugby Stadium, Edinburgh
Attendance: 5,407
Referee: Ludovic Cayre (France)

==== Quarter-final ====
Victory in the round of 16, and the loss of second seed, Montpellier in the same round left Edinburgh as the top seed in their half of the draw, and a guaranteed home semi-final if they defeated Bulls in the quarter-final.

12 April 2025
12:30

Edinburgh (Scotland) (3)	34–28	(11) (South Africa) Bulls
Try: Lang, 3’, 24'; Bradbury, 13’ Gilchrist, 42’ Con: Thompson (4/4), 4', 14', 25', 43'; Pen: Thompson, 37', 59'	Report	Try: Kriel, 16', 76' penalty try, 46'; Hanekom, 49'; Con: Johannes (1/1) , 17'; Goosen (2/2), 50', 76'

Edinburgh Rugby Stadium, Edinburgh
Attendance: 4,737
Referee: Pierre Brousset (France)

==== Semi final ====
A second successive home victory against South African opposition in the quarter final guaranteed Edinburgh a home Anglo-Scottish semi-final against a Gallagher Premiership team, either Bath or Gloucester, the latter the only team to beat Edinburgh in Europe this season.

12:30

Edinburgh (Scotland) (3)	v	(England) Bath

Edinburgh Rugby Stadium, Edinburgh

== Friendlies ==
12 September 2024
19:00

Edinburgh (Scotland)	33–26	(England) Gloucester
Try: Graham, 6'; Bradbury, 31'; Vellacott, 38'; Dodd, 42'; Cherry,54'; Con: Healy (2); Thompson, (2)	Report	Try: Llewellyn, 3'; Mercer, 23'; Williams, 28'; Fasogbon,40'; Con: Barton (3)

Edinburgh Rugby Stadium, Edinburgh
Attendance: 5,521
Referee: I Kenny (SRU)

14 March 2025
19:35

Edinburgh (Scotland)	45–54	(England) Saracens

Edinburgh Rugby Stadium, Edinburgh

== Home attendance ==
Edinburgh's normal home stadium, the Edinburgh Rugby Stadium or The Hive has a capacity of 7,800. however, Edinburgh moved their home leg of the 1872 Cup fixture with Glasgow Warriors to Murrayfield Stadium. The bumper 40,063 crowd for this match over the festive period raises their average attendance above the capacity of their main stadium. Their Scottish rivals, Glasgow similarly moved their home fixture, in turn, to Hampden Park.

Domestic League						European Cup						Total	
League	Fixtures	Total Attendance	Average Attendance	Highest	Lowest	League	Fixtures	Total Attendance	Average Attendance	Highest	Lowest	Total Attendance	Average Attendance
2024–25 United Rugby Championship	9	94,812	10,535	40,063*	5,494	2024–25 European Rugby Challenge Cup	4	22,567	5,692	6,538	4,737	117,980	9,089
