= 2016 Scottish Rugby U-20 Championship =

- Countries: Scotland
- Date: July – August 2016

The 2016 Scottish Rugby U-20 Championship was contested from July - August 2016. The tournament is run by the Scottish Rugby Union and was competed for by the 4 regional teams from the BT Sport Scottish Rugby Academy.

The U-20 Championship is three rounds of the regional round-robin with conclusion on 21 August.

== Teams ==
The following teams take part in the 2016 Scottish Rugby U-20 Championship:

2016 Scottish Rugby U-20 Championship
Team Name	Ground
Caledonia U20	Hillhead, Aberdeen
Edinburgh U20	Napier University, Edinburgh
West U20	Broadwood Stadium, Cumbernauld
Borders U20	Netherdale, Galashiels

== Standings ==
The round robin standings for the 2016 Scottish Rugby U-20 Championship were:

2016 Scottish Rugby U-20 Championship
Pos	Team	P	W	D	L	PF	PA	PD	TB	LB	Pts
1	Edinburgh U20	3	3	0	0	63	23	40	2	0	14
2	West U20	3	2	0	1	86	32	54	2	1	11
3	Caledonia U20	3	1	0	2	58	23	-21	1	0	5
4	Borders U20	3	0	0	3	11	109	-98	0	0	0

== Fixtures and results ==
The following matches were played in the 2016 Scottish Rugby U-20 Championship:

- All times are GMT.

=== Round One ===
27 July 2016	Edinburgh U20	23-10	Caledonia U20	Lasswade
18:00	Try: Malcolm Jack, Ally Davidson, Robert Kay, John Grant; Con: Ben Appleson (2), Ally Davidson	Report	Try: Shaun Gunn, Matt Fagerson

27 July 2016	West U20	43-0	Borders U20	Lasswade
19:45	Try: Walker Graham, Ryan Sweeny, Aaron Tait (3), Ruairidh Sayce, Peter Burns; Con: Josh Henderson (3), Paddy Dewhurst	Report

=== Round Two ===
31 July 2016	Caledonia U20	15-31	West U20	Netherdale, Galashiels
17:00	Try: Logan Trotter, James Evans	Report	Try: Robbie Smith, Andrew Simmers, Charlie Lonergan, Jordan McLean

31 July 2016	Borders U20	11-33	Edinburgh U20	Netherdale, Galashiels
18:45	Try: Stuart Allison	Report	Try: Robert Kay, Thomas Gordon, Ally Davidson, Jonny Goldring

=== Round Three ===
7 Aug 2016	Borders U20	0 - 33	Caledonia U20	Broadwood Stadium, Cumbernauld
17:00

7 Aug 2016	West U20	12 - 17	Edinburgh U20	Broadwood Stadium, Cumbernauld
18:45

== Finals ==
=== Champions final ===
21 August 2016
19:15

Edinburgh U20	24 - 22	Glasgow & The West U20
Try: Crosbie, Gordon, McCann, Davies.		Try: Kenderdine, Jackson, Paxton, Bordill

Murrayfield Stadium

FB	15	Ben Appleson
RW	14	Ross McCann
OC	13	Ally Greig
IC	12	Lewis Berg
LW	11	Jack Paterson
FH	10	Ally Davidson
SH	9	Charlie Shiel
N8	8	Jonny Goldring
BF	7	Thomas Gordon
OF	6	Jamie Ure)
RL	5	Josh O'Brien
LL	4	Hamish Bain
TP	3	Dan Winning
HK	2	John Grant
LP	1	Ross Dunbar
Replacements:
HK	16	Sam Duncan
PR	17	Tyrone Heffron
PR	18	Callum Eastwood
LK	19	Luke Crosbie
FL	20	Gregor Nelson
SH	21	Connor Adams
FH	22	Ronan Kerr
WG	23	Chris Davies

FB	15	Bruce Sorbie
RW	14	Sam Graham
OC	13	Gregor Paxton
IC	12	Stafford McDowell
LW	11	Aaron Tait
FH	10	Paddy Dewhirst
SH	9	Andrew Simmers
N8	8	Ben Kenderdine
OF	7	Walker Graham
BF	6	Ross Jackson
RL	5	Jordan McLean
LL	4	Lloyd Clark
TP	3	Adam Nicol
HK	2	Robbie Smith
LP	1	Michael Scott
Replacements:
HK	16	Paul Cairncross
PR	17	Callum Braid
PR	18	Ruairidh Sayce
LK	19	George Bordill
N8	20	Craig McCall
SH	21	Donald Kennedy
CE	22	Peter Steele
WG	23	Peter Burns
