= Jamie Drummond (rugby union) =

Scottish rugby union player (born 1999)

- Born: 9 April 2001 (age 25) Mauchline, Scotland
- Height: 1.73 m (5 ft 8 in)
- Weight: 103 kg (16 st 3 lb)
- School: Auchinleck Academy, Marr College

Rugby union career
- Position: Hooker
Amateur team(s)
Years	Team	Apps	(Points)
- Cumnock RFC
- Marr RFC
Senior career
Years	Team	Apps	(Points)
2022-23	Glasgow Warriors	2	(0)
2022	→ London Scottish	11	(15)
Super Rugby
Years	Team	Apps	(Points)
2020-	Ayrshire Bulls	27	(5)
International career
Years	Team	Apps	(Points)
- Scotland U16
- Scotland U18
2020–21	Scotland U20	4	(0)

Jamie Drummond (born 9 December 1999) is a Scottish rugby union player. He plays as a Hooker for Ayrshire Bulls. He previously played for Glasgow Warriors, London Scottish, Marr and Cumnock.

== Rugby Union career ==
=== Amateur career ===
He originally played for Cumnock RFC.

He joined Marr RFC in 2018.

=== Professional career ===
He was given a place in the Scottish Rugby Academy for the 2021–22 season and assigned to Glasgow Warriors.

He was also assigned to Ayrshire Bulls and played for them in the Super 6.

He played for Ayrshire Bulls against Glasgow Warriors in the 2 September 2022 match at Inverness. It was a tight match but Warriors edged the victory 22 - 17.

He was loaned out to London Scottish in November 2022. While with London Scottish, he also trained with Harlequins.

He made his competitive debut for the Exiles in the RFU Championship match against Doncaster Knights on 10 December 2022.

He returned to join the Warriors squad on 12 December 2022, ahead of their European Challenge Cup match against USA Perpignan.

He was named again in the 2023 Ayrshire Bulls squad for the Super Series Championship.

=== International career ===
He has played for Scotland U16, Scotland U18 and Scotland U20.

== Farming career ==
Drummond works on the family farm.
