= Chloe Rollie =

Scottish rugby union player (born 1995)

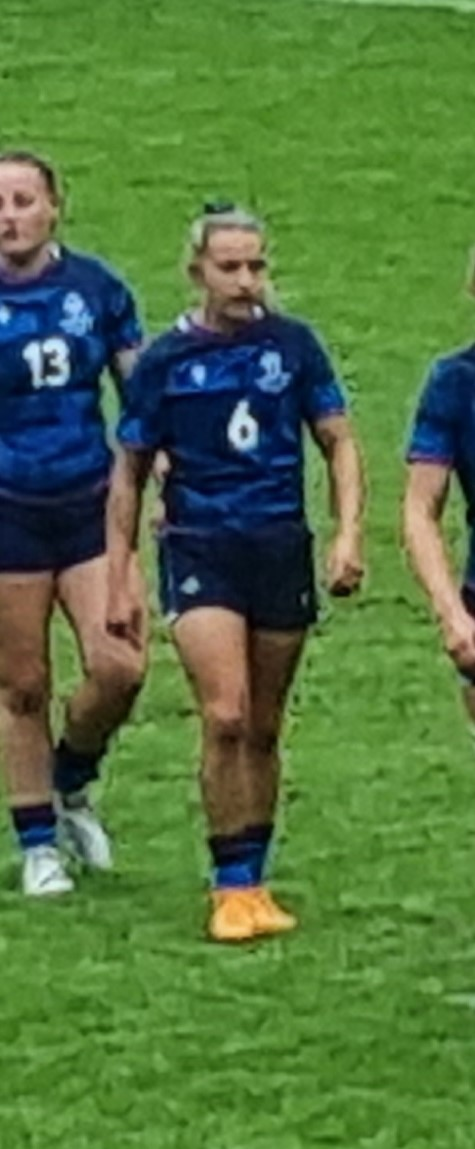
- Born: 26 June 1995 (age 31) Edinburgh, Scotland
- Height: 163 cm (5 ft 4 in)
- Weight: 60 kg (132 lb)
- School: Jedburgh Grammar School
- Occupation: Professional Rugby Player

Rugby union career
- Position: Full-back
Amateur team(s)
| Years | Team | Apps | (Points) |
- Melrose
| – | Murrayfield Wanderers | | |
Senior career
| Years | Team | Apps | (Points) |
| 2017–19 | Stade Villeneuvois LM | | |
| 2019–21 | Harlequins | 15 | (45) |
| 2021–22 | Exeter Chiefs | 6 | (5) |
| 2022–24 | Loughborough Lightning | 17 | (25) |
| 2024–25 | Trailfinders | 11 | (5) |
| 2025–2026 | Toulon Provence Méditerranée | | |
- Correct as of 2 July 2025
International career
| Years | Team | Apps | (Points) |
| 2015– | Scotland | 81 | (130) |
- Correct as of 26 September 2025
National sevens team
| Years | Team | | Comps |
| 2016– | Scotland | | |

Chloe Rollie (born 26 June 1995 in Edinburgh) is a Scottish international rugby union footballer who currently plays as a full-back for Trailfinders in the Premier 15s, as well as the Scottish national team.

== International career ==
Rollie received her first international cap in the opening match of the 2015 Women's Six Nations Championship, with Scotland succumbing to a 42-0 defeat at the hands of the French. She scored her first points for the national team with a brace against Italy in the 2017 Women's Six Nations Championship, seeing her named player of the match. In the 2018 Women's Six Nations Championship, she gained widespread plaudits for a try which saw her run the length of the field to secure the decisive points in Scotland's first away Six Nations win for 12 years.

In 2016, Rollie was called up to the Scotland 7s team. She made her debut in the first leg of the European Women's Sevens Championship in Prague, scoring eight tries. In the 2017 competition, held in Ostrava, she was a member of the team who won the trophy without conceding a point.

She was a key part of the Scotland Sevens side who won the Rugby Europe Women’s Sevens Trophy in 2017. This performance helped her to sign a professional deal with Lille Metropole Rugby Club Villeneuvois (LMRCV) along with international teammates Jade Konkel and Lisa Thomson.

She scored three tries in the 2018 Six Nations campaign, including a length of the field effort to secure victory for Scotland away to Ireland in Dublin.

She was an integral part in the Scotland 7s squad that gained promotion to the Rugby Europe Grand Prix in 2018 and were invited to the Hong Kong 7s Qualification Event in April 2019, finishing second to Brazil, as well as the 2020 Challenger Series in Hong Kong. The side were then the invitational team at the French leg of the World Rugby Women’s Sevens Series in Biarritz in June 2019, with Rollie being part of the squad.

Rollie was named as one of six Scottish players included in the wider training squad for the Great Britain 7s team ahead of the 2020 Tokyo Summer Olympics.

Playing in the 2021 Women's Six Nations Championship, she is one of nine professional or semi-professional players within the Scottish team.

Rollie was named in the Scotland squad for the 2021 Rugby World Cup.

She was named in Scotland's squad for the 2025 Six Nations Championship. She was selected in the Scottish side for the Women's Rugby World Cup.

== Club career ==
Rollie played youth rugby with Jedburgh mini-rugby and Galashiels where, playing alongside boys, she came through the age grades. After leaving school, she played for the women's teams at Melrose RFC for three years, until she was 19, when she joined the Murrayfield Wanderers for two seasons when studying in Edinburgh. During her time playing for the team, the club won two league titles.

She then moved to France to make her debut in professional rugby for Lille Metropole Rugby Club Villeneuvois on 1 October 2017, kicking five conversions in a victory over AC Bobigny 93. Rollie was part of the team when it reached the semi-finals of the top eight in France.

Rollie was awarded a place in the Scottish Rugby Academy for season 2017-18. She was a Stage 3 player for Lille Metropole Rugby Club Villeneuvois. On accepting this award, she became only the second Scottish woman to turn professional.

After two years with Lille Metropole Rugby Club Villeneuvois, Rollie then moved to England's Premier 15s to play for Harlequins Women in 2019. She started at fullback in the 2020-21 Premier 15s final. Harlequins beat Saracens 25-17 and Rollie won her first Premier 15s title.

Her position history includes playing wing for Melrose ladies, before taking her place as a fullback for Murrayfield wanderers, Lille Metropole Rugby Club Villeneuvois, Harlequins Women and the Scottish national team.

Rollie signed for Exeter Chiefs prior to the 2021/22 Premier 15s season.

== Personal life ==
Rollie was raised in Jedburgh in the Scottish Borders. She attended Parkside Primary school and Jedburgh Grammar School. It was the influence of three older brothers which saw Rollie take her first steps in the game. She began playing rugby aged eight with the Jed-Forest mini rugby team, where she was one of three girls in the mixed team. At 11, she began playing for the Gala Girls u15, then u18s.

After school, she attended the Borders College and Edinburgh College to study sports science. Before turning professional, she worked as a labourer and a dump truck driver for an excavation company. In her teens, she also played football for Heart of Midlothian Football Club.

Her studies continue with a Sport and Fitness Diploma through Open University.

In an interview with the Clydebank Post in April 2021, she spoke of how the profile of women's rugby in Scotland is beginning to rise.

== Honours ==
- Twice won Player of the Match in victories against Wales and Italy in the Women’s Six Nations 2017 7s
