= Jack Mann (rugby union) =

Scottish rugby union player

- Born: Jack Mann; 17 November 1999 (age 26) Scotland
- Height: 1.95 m (6 ft 5 in)
- Weight: 115 kg (254 lb; 18 st 2 lb)

Rugby union career
- Position: Flanker / Number 8
Amateur team(s)
Years	Team	Apps	(Points)
- Lasswade
- Edinburgh Academicals
Senior career
Years	Team	Apps	(Points)
2019-2021	Edinburgh Rugby	0	(0)
2022-2025	Glasgow Warriors	15	(10)
2025–	Gloucester	4	(0)
Super Rugby
Years	Team	Apps	(Points)
2019-2022	Heriot's		
International career
Years	Team	Apps	(Points)
2019	Scotland U20s		

Jack Mann (born 17 November 1999 in Scotland) is a Scottish rugby union player. He plays as a Number 8 for Gloucester.

== Rugby Union career ==
=== Amateur career ===
He started playing rugby with Lasswade RFC minis.

He played for Edinburgh Academicals.

=== Professional career ===
He was given a place in the Scottish Rugby Academy for the 2019-20 season and assigned to Edinburgh Rugby, alongside Heriot's.

Mann played for Heriot's in the Super 6.

After impressing for the Super 6 side, he was selected to train with Glasgow Warriors. He made his competitive debut for the Glasgow side in the European Challenge Cup against Bath Rugby on 10 December 2022. He became Glasgow Warrior No. 349.

He signed a new contract with the Glasgow Warriors on 13 March 2024.

On 30 April 2025, Mann would leave Glasgow to sign for English side Gloucester in the Premiership Rugby ahead of the 2025–26 season.

=== International career ===
He played for Scotland U20s.
