= Dan York =

Scottish rugby union player

- Born: Daniel York
- Height: 6 ft 0 in (1.83 m)
- Weight: 105 kg (16 st 7 lb)
- School: St Aloysius' College, Glasgow

Rugby union career
- Position: Tighthead Prop
Amateur team(s)
Years	Team	Apps	(Points)
-17	West of Scotland		
2017-	Glasgow Hawks		
Senior career
Years	Team	Apps	(Points)
2017-	Glasgow Warriors		
Provincial / State sides
Years	Team	Apps	(Points)
- Glasgow U16
-	West of Scotland District U18		
International career
Years	Team	Apps	(Points)
- Scotland U18s

Daniel York is a Scottish rugby union player who is a Stage 3 Scottish Rugby Academy player assigned to Glasgow Warriors. His usual position is at the Prop position.

== Rugby Union career ==
=== Amateur career ===
York started his rugby union career playing for his school St Aloysius' College, Glasgow.

He then moved to play for West of Scotland.

York was named in the 2016-17 Scottish Rugby Academy.

He signed for Glasgow Hawks for 2017.

=== Professional career ===
York has played for Glasgow District at Under 16.

West of Scotland District U18 side against the East of Scotland U18.

York trained with the Glasgow Warriors in the 2017-18 pre-season. Coach Kenny Murray praised him saying "he had applied himself really well".

York graduated to be a Stage 3 player in the BT Sport Scottish Rugby Academy and named in the second intake of the 2017-18 season to the Glasgow regional academy and assigned to Glasgow Warriors.

=== International career ===
York has played for the Scotland U18s.
