= Robbie McCallum (rugby union) =

Scottish rugby union player (born 2000)

- Born: 11 June 2000 (age 26) Milngavie, Scotland
- Height: 1.8 m (5 ft 11 in)
- Weight: 88 kg (13 st 12 lb)
- School: Loretto School
- Notable relative(s): Struan McCallum, grandfather

Rugby union career
- Position: Centre
Amateur team(s)
Years	Team	Apps	(Points)
- West of Scotland
2018	Musselburgh		
2019	Glasgow Hutchesons Aloysians		
Senior career
Years	Team	Apps	(Points)
2018	Complutense Cisneros		
2019-22	Glasgow Warriors	0	(0)
2022-	London Scottish		
Super Rugby
Years	Team	Apps	(Points)
2020-22	Boroughmuir Bears		
International career
Years	Team	Apps	(Points)
- Scotland U16
- Scotland U18
- Scotland U19
2018-20	Scotland U20	15	(25)

Robbie McCallum (born 11 June 2000) is a Scottish rugby union player. He plays as a centre for London Scottish. He previously played for Glasgow Warriors and Boroughmuir Bears.

== Rugby Union career ==
=== Amateur career ===
He played for West of Scotland.

When he moved to Musselburgh to go to Loretto School he then played for Musselburgh.

He left school in 2018. His brother was staying in Spain and McCallum then joined him in Madrid.

After injury when playing for the Boroughmuir Bears, McCallum recovered his fitness by playing for Glasgow Hutchesons Aloysians in the Scottish Premiership.

=== Professional career ===
He played for Complutense Cisneros in the professional Spanish top league.

He was given a place in the Scottish Rugby Academy for the 2019–20 season and assigned to Glasgow Warriors.

He was also assigned to Boroughmuir Bears and played for them in the Super 6.

He played for Glasgow Warriors against Edinburgh Rugby in the 4 February 2021 'A' match at Scotstoun Stadium. It was behind closed doors due to the coronavirus pandemic.

He signed for London Scottish to play in the RFU Championship in August 2022.

=== International career ===
He has played for Scotland U16, Scotland U18, Scotland U19 and Scotland U20.

== Cricket career ==
McCallum played for West of Scotland Cricket Club at the same time he played for the West of Scotland rugby club. He moved to Loretto School in Musselburgh, as the cricket coach there John Blain had also coached the West side.

He played for Scotland Under 15s and Scotland Under 17s at cricket.

== Family ==
His grandfather Struan McCallum was a tighthead prop for Jordanhill, Glasgow District and Scotland 'B'.
