= Jacob Henry =

Scottish rugby union player

- Born: Jacob Henry; 31 August 2000 (age 26) Scotland
- Height: 1.83 m (6 ft 0 in)
- Weight: 90 kg (14 st 2 lb)

Rugby union career
- Position: Wing / Fullback
- Current team: Edinburgh Rugby
Senior career
Years	Team	Apps	(Points)
2020–	Edinburgh Rugby	3	(5)
- Correct as of 22 March 2023
International career
Years	Team	Apps	(Points)
2020	Scotland U20	5	(0)
- Correct as of 23 January 2022
National sevens team
Years	Team		Comps
2021–	Scotland Sevens		5 (25)
- Correct as of 23 January 2022

Jacob Henry (born 31 August 2000) is a Scottish rugby union player who currently plays for Edinburgh Rugby in the United Rugby Championship.

== Rugby Union career ==
=== Professional career ===
Henry was named in the Edinburgh academy squad for the 2021–22 season. He made his debut for Edinburgh on 23 March 2024 against the Stormers in the Cape Town Stadium, scoring a try in a 43-21 defeat. He has represented Scotland Sevens at one tournament.

Sporting positions
Preceded by Angus Fraser; Andrew Jardine; Guy Kelly	John Macphail Scholarship; Thomas Jeffrey; Jacob Henry; Kristian Kay; 2018	Succeeded by Cole Lamberton; Mikey Heron; Adam Scott
