= Rudi Brown =

Scottish rugby union player

- Born: 14 December 2003 (age 22) Melrose, Scotland
- Height: 1.93 m (6 ft 4 in)
- Weight: 110 kg (240 lb; 17 st 5 lb)

Rugby union career
- Position: Flanker
- Current team: Vannes
Senior career
Years	Team	Apps	(Points)
2022–2023	Edinburgh Rugby	1	(0)
2023-	Vannes		
- Correct as of 26 April 2023
International career
Years	Team	Apps	(Points)
2022	Scotland U20	1	(0)
2024	Emerging Scotland	1	(0)
- Correct as of 6 March 2022

Rudi Brown (born 14 December 2003) is a Scottish rugby union player who last played for Edinburgh Rugby in the United Rugby Championship.

== Rugby Union career ==
=== Professional career ===
Brown was named in the Edinburgh academy for the 2021–22 season. He made his Edinburgh debut on 4 March in the Round 12 match of the 2021–22 United Rugby Championship against Connacht.

=== International career ===
He played for Emerging Scotland in their first match on 14 December 2024.
