= Angus Fraser (rugby union) =

Scottish rugby union player (born 1999)

- Born: Angus Fraser; 9 December 1999 (age 26) Dundee, Scotland
- Height: 1.83 m (6 ft 0 in)
- Weight: 110 kg (17 st 5 lb)

Rugby union career
- Position: Hooker/Flanker
Amateur team(s)
| Years | Team | Apps | (Points) |
- Dundee HSFP
Senior career
| Years | Team | Apps | (Points) |
| 2020- | Glasgow Warriors | 28 | (10) |
Super Rugby
| Years | Team | Apps | (Points) |
| 2021-22 | Stirling Wolves | | |
International career
| Years | Team | Apps | (Points) |
- Scotland U18
| – | Scotland U20 | | |

Angus Fraser (born 9 December 1999 in Dundee, Scotland) is a Scottish rugby union player. He plays as a Hooker or Flanker for Glasgow Warriors.

== Rugby Union career ==
=== Amateur career ===
He played for Dundee HSFP, before the club merged with Morgan Academy RFC in 2021.

He was a recipient of the MacPhail Scholarship for the 2017-18 season, and as result had 5 months in South Africa at Stellenbosch University to aid his rugby development.

=== Professional career ===
He was given a place in the Scottish Rugby Academy for the 2020-21 season and assigned to Glasgow Warriors.

There was no Super 6 tournament that season, due to the Coronavirus pandemic. However the following season he remained in the academy assigned to Glasgow Warriors, but he was also assigned to Stirling Wolves.

He was graduated out of the academy and was given a professional contract by the Warriors in May 2021.

He made his competitive debut for the Glasgow side in the European Challenge Cup against Bath Rugby on 10 December 2022. He became Glasgow Warrior No. 350.

=== International career ===
He has played for Scotland U18 and Scotland U20.

Sporting positions
| Preceded by Patrick Kelly; Ross McCann | John Macphail Scholarship; Angus Fraser; Andrew Jardine; Guy Kelly; 2017 | Succeeded by Thomas Jeffrey; Jacob Henry; Kristian Kay |
