= Cammy Hutchison =

Scottish rugby union player (born 1998)

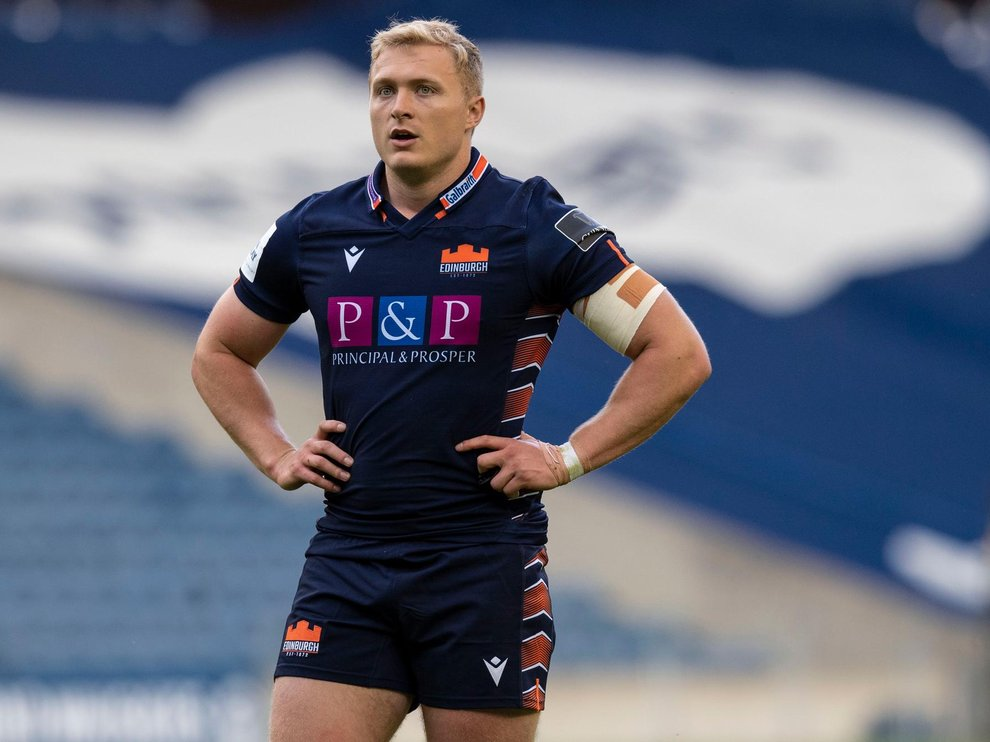
- Cammy Hutchison - Edinburgh Rugby
- Born: Cameron Hamish MacDougall Hutchison; 1 June 1998 (age 28) Birmingham, West Midlands, England
- Height: 182 cm (6 ft 0 in)
- Weight: 104 kg (229 lb; 16 st 5 lb)
- School: North Berwick High School; George Heriot's School
- University: Heriot-Watt University

Rugby union career
- Position: Centre
- Current team: Newcastle Red Bulls
Senior career
Years	Team	Apps	(Points)
2018–2019	Stade Niçois	15	(5)
2021–2023	Edinburgh Rugby	20	(15)
2021–2023	→ Edinburgh 'A'	2	(0)
2023–2025	Newcastle Falcons	23	(0)
2025–2025	Saracens	4	(0)
2025-	Newcastle Red Bulls	11	(5)
- Correct as of 26 April 2023
International career
Years	Team	Apps	(Points)
2016–2017	Scotland U18	4	(15)
2015–2016	Scotland U19	1	(0)
2017–2018	Scotland U20	8	(5)

Cameron Hutchison (born 1 June 1998) is a Scottish professional rugby union player who currently plays for Newcastle Red Bulls in the Premiership Rugby.

== Amateur career ==
Hutchison born in Birmingham and moved to North Berwick when he was 2 where he attended North Berwick High School and latterly George Heriot's School in Edinburgh. He was awarded a Stage 3 contract in the BT Sport Scottish Rugby Academy in 2016.

== Professional career ==
In 2018 Hutchison played in the south of France, through Scottish Rugby's performance partnership with French Federale 1 side Stade Niçois.

He returned to Scotland after his one-year loan period and signed for Heriot's Rugby in Scottish Rugby's Super 6 franchise earning 3 Player of the Match awards.

Hutchison started training with Edinburgh Rugby in November 2020 and made a try-scoring debut for the club in the Guinness PRO14 Rainbow Cup clash against Ulster in June 2021.

Following his performances in the Rainbow Cup Hutchison signed a professional contract with Edinburgh Rugby in partnership with FOSROC Super6 side Heriot's Rugby.

Following strong performances at the start of the 2021–2022 United Rugby Championship season, Hutchison's contract was upgraded a full time professional contract with Edinburgh Rugby.

In April 2023 Hutchison announced he would be joining Newcastle Falcons at the start of the 2023–24 Premiership Rugby season. After two seasons with Newcastle, Hutchison signed for Saracens on a short-term ten-week deal.

In November 2025, following the purchase of Newcastle Falcons by Red Bull, Hutchison signed for Newcastle Red Bulls.

== International career ==
Hutchison was chosen to lead the Scotland U18s at the inaugural International Series held in Wales in April 2016. He also Captained the Scotland U19s in a game against Georgia U20 in November 2016

Hutchison played in the highly successful Scotland U20 side in the 2016–2017 season before sustaining a season ending injury against England U-20's during a Six Nations game in Northampton. He returned from injury in time to join the team for the 2017-18 World Cup in France.
