= Robbie Smith (rugby union) =

Scottish rugby union player

- Born: Robbie Smith; 26 September 1998 (age 28) Dumfries, Scotland
- Height: 1.76 m (5 ft 9 1/2 in)
- Weight: 113 kg (17 st 11 lb; 249 lb)
- School: Douglas Ewart High School

Rugby union career
- Position: Hooker
- Current team: Northampton Saints
Amateur team(s)
Years	Team	Apps	(Points)
–	Newton Stewart		
–	Ayr		
Senior career
Years	Team	Apps	(Points)
2017–2019	Glasgow Warriors	1	(0)
2019–2020	Bedford Blues	19	(0)
2020–2022	Newcastle Falcons	10	(15)
2022–	Northampton Saints	45	(20)
- Correct as of 3 January 2026
International career
Years	Team	Apps	(Points)
–	Scotland U16		
–	Scotland U18		
–	Scotland U20		
2024	Scotland	2	(0)

Robbie Smith (born 26 September 1998) is a Scotland international rugby union player who plays for Northampton Saints. His usual position is hooker.

== Amateur career ==
He started playing rugby with Newton Stewart before then playing with Ayr.

He was assigned Ayr in the Pro draft for the Scottish Premiership sides from Glasgow Warriors for the season 2017-18.

== Professional career ==
Smith was enrolled in the BT Sport Scottish Rugby Academy as a Stage 3 player. Stage 3 players are aligned to a professional club and given regional support.

Smith made his Glasgow Warriors debut in the Pro14 match against Ospreys at Scotstoun Stadium on 25 January 2019. The Warriors won the match 9-3.

On 3 May 2019, Smith signed his first professional contract with Bedford Blues in the English RFU Championship for the 2019-20 season. On 23 September 2020, Smith moves to the Premiership Rugby with Newcastle Falcons from the 2020-21 season.

== International career ==
Smith has played for Scotland U16, U18 and U20 teams.

In June 2024 Smith was called up to the senior Scotland squad for a tour of The Americas.

He made his Scotland debut against Canada on 6 July 2024 at TD Place Stadium in Ottawa. Scotland won the match 73 points to 12. Smith has the Scotland no. 1226.
