= Jamie Dobie =

Scotland international rugby union player (born 2001)

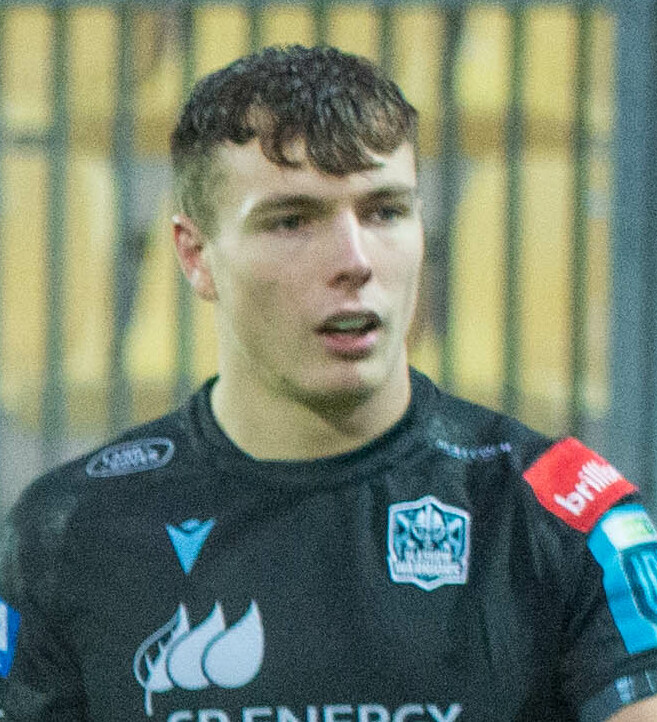
- Dobie in 2022
- Full name: Jamie Dobie
- Born: 7 June 2001 (age 25) Inverness, Scotland
- Height: 1.78 m (5 ft 10 in)
- Weight: 81 kg (179 lb; 12 st 11 lb)

Rugby union career
- Position(s): Scrum-half, Winger
- Current team: Glasgow Warriors
Senior career
Years	Team	Apps	(Points)
2019–	Glasgow Warriors	103	(130)
2022	Bay of Plenty	3	(0)
- Correct as of 24 October 2026
International career
Years	Team	Apps	(Points)
2021–	Scotland	25	(45)
2024–	Scotland A	1	(0)
- Correct as of 18 November 2026

Jamie Dobie (born 7 June 2001) is a Scottish professional rugby union player who plays as a scrum-half or winger for United Rugby Championship club Glasgow Warriors and the Scotland national team.

== Early life ==
Dobie started his rugby career playing minis for Highland.

Dobie played for his school team Merchiston Castle School before signing for Glasgow Warriors. He won the Scottish Schools Cup Final at Murrayfield Stadium with his school team in December 2018, beating St Aloysius College in the final.

Dobie secured a Stage 1 place in the Scottish Rugby Academy in the 2017–18 season. The following year he remained in the Academy at Stage 2.

Dobie then bypassed the expected progression route; which was a Stage 3 professional contract with the Scottish Rugby Academy for the 2019–20 season. A Stage 3 contract would have given the player a placement with a professional club; with a chance to earn a professional club contract on good performances.

Dobie won the award of most 'Exciting Prospect' at the 2018 Offside Line End of Year awards. He was courted by a number of English Premiership clubs.

== Club career ==
On 30 April 2019 it was announced that Dobie had signed a professional deal with Glasgow Warriors. He is the first player that the Warriors have signed directly from school; and the first player from the Scottish Rugby Academy to sign a professional contract with a professional club direct from Stage 2 – without needing to move to the Stage 3 placement.

Head Coach Dave Rennie stated: "It’s uncommon for a player to be signed straight from school, but Jamie is one of the most exciting young talents in the country and we believe he’s ready to thrive in a professional environment."

Dobie signed a two-year deal that would keep him at Scotstoun until 2021. Dobie re-signed with Glasgow to stay for 2+ years in 2021.

Dobie made his debut for Glasgow Warriors against Ulster Rugby on 7 September 2019 at the Kingspan Stadium. He followed that up with another appearance against Ulster on 14 September 2019 at Scotstoun Stadium.

Dobie made his first Pro14 appearance against the Cheetahs in South Africa on 27 September 2019.

== International career ==
Dobie has been capped at Scotland U16s and Scotland U18s. Dobie received his first call up to the senior Scotland squad in February 2021 for the 2021 Six Nations Championship.

Dobie made his Scotland debut against Tonga on 30 October 2021. Scotland won the match 60 - 14.

=== List of international tries ===
No.	Date	Venue	Opponent	Score	Result	Competition
1	6 July 2024	TD Place Stadium, Ottawa, Canada	Canada	57-12	73-12	2024 mid-year rugby union tests
2	20 July 2024	Estadio Nacional Julio Martínez Prádanos, Santiago, Chile	Chile	19-6	52-11	2024 mid-year rugby union tests
3	20 July 2024	Estadio Nacional Julio Martínez Prádanos, Santiago, Chile	Chile	24-6	52-11	2024 mid-year rugby union tests
4	16 November 2024	Murrayfield Stadium, Edinburgh, Scotland	Portugal	57-21	59-21	2024 end-of-year rugby union internationals
4	1 November 2025	Murrayfield Stadium, Edinburgh, Scotland	United States	19-0	85-0	2025 end-of-year rugby union internationals
5	1 November 2025	Murrayfield Stadium, Edinburgh, Scotland	United States	38-0	85-0	2025 end-of-year rugby union internationals
6	1 November 2025	Murrayfield Stadium, Edinburgh, Scotland	United States	78-0	85-0	2025 end-of-year rugby union internationals
7	18 July 2026	Murrayfield Stadium, Edinburgh, Scotland	Fiji	19-17	33-17	Nations Championship
8	18 July 2026	Murrayfield Stadium, Edinburgh, Scotland	Fiji	33-17	33-17	Nations Championship
