= Cameron Henderson =

Scottish rugby union player

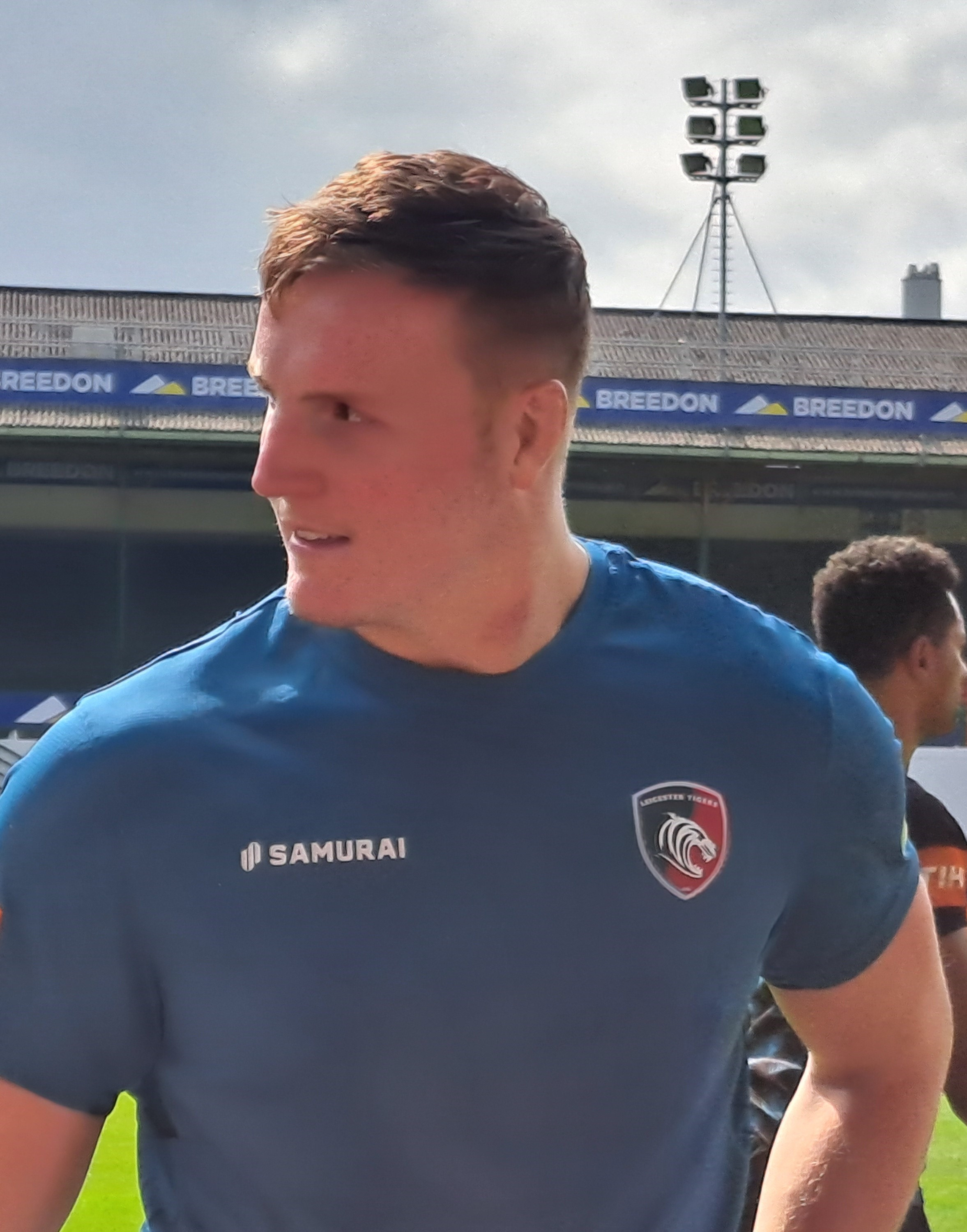
- Henderson in August 2024
- Born: 13 January 2000 (age 26) Hong Kong SAR
- Height: 2.01 m (6 ft 7 in)
- Weight: 118 kg (260 lb; 18 st 8 lb)
- School: Strathallan School

Rugby union career
- Position: Lock
- Current team: Leicester Tigers
Youth career
- Hong Kong FC
- 2013–2018: Strathallan School
Amateur team(s)
Years	Team	Apps	(Points)
2018–2020	Stirling County		
Senior career
Years	Team	Apps	(Points)
2020–	Leicester Tigers	94	(60)
2022	→ Nottingham (loan)	1	(0)
- Correct as of 1 November 2026
International career
Years	Team	Apps	(Points)
2018	Scotland U18	3	(0)
2019–2020	Scotland U20	11	(0)
2023	Scotland	2	(0)
- Correct as of 29 July 2023

Cameron Henderson (born 13 January 2000) is a Scottish professional rugby union player who plays as a lock for Gallagher Premiership club Leicester Tigers. Born in Hong Kong, he represents Scotland at international level after qualifying on ancestry grounds.

== Early life ==
Henderson was born in Hong Kong in 2000. His Scottish father, Russel, was resident in Hong Kong working as a loss adjuster. He started his rugby union career in Hong Kong as a colt for Hong Kong FC.

Henderson came to Scotland from Hong Kong in 2013. He played rugby union for Strathallan School in Perthshire. He was in the team that won the Scottish Schools Cup of 2017-2018 season, beating Glenalmond College in the final.

Henderson joined the Scottish Rugby Academy in the 2017-18 season as a Stage 2 supported player.

Henderson played for Stirling County in the Scottish Premiership.

== Club career ==
Henderson graduated to be a Stage 3 player in the Fosroc Scottish Rugby Academy for the 2018-19 season. Stage 3 players are given a professional contract by the Academy. He was placed in the Caledonia academy and assigned to Glasgow Warriors for the season.

He signed for Leicester Tigers on 10 April 2020. Henderson made his Leicester debut on 22 August 2020 as a replacement in a game against Bath at Welford Road, and scored his first try a week later against Gloucester at Kingsholm.

== International career ==
Henderson has played for Scotland U18. In June 2021, Henderson was called up to the Scotland squad for the Summer internationals. However, he won his first cap in the World Cup warm up match versus Italy at Murrayfield on 29 July 2023. In January 2025, he was called into the 6 Nations squad.
