= Murphy Walker =

Scottish rugby union player (born 1999)

- Full name: Murphy Bailey Walker
- Born: 25 October 1999 (age 27) Dundee, Scotland
- Height: 1.85 m (6 ft 1 in)
- Weight: 117 kg (258 lb; 18 st 6 lb)
- School: Strathallan School
- Notable relative: Sean Lineen (uncle)

Rugby union career
- Position: Prop
Amateur team(s)
Years	Team	Apps	(Points)
- Dundee HSFP
2025	Glasgow Hawks		
Senior career
Years	Team	Apps	(Points)
2018–	Glasgow Warriors	21	(0)
Super Rugby
Years	Team	Apps	(Points)
2019-20	Stirling Wolves		
International career
Years	Team	Apps	(Points)
2018–2019	Scotland U20	19	(5)
2022	Scotland 'A'	1	(0)
2022–	Scotland	5	(0)
- Correct as of 27 July 2024
Coaching career
- Years: Team
- 2023-: Glasgow Hawks (Scrum Coach)

Murphy Bailey Walker (born 25 October 1999) is a Scotland international rugby union player who plays as a prop for United Rugby Championship club Glasgow Warriors. He is also a Scrum Coach at Glasgow Hawks.

== Rugby Union career ==
=== Amateur career ===
Walker played for Dundee HSFP.

He played for Strathallan School. With the school he was the captain of the winning team that won the Scottish Schools tournament in 2018, beating Glenalmond College in the final.

When returning from injury in 2025, Walker played for Glasgow Hawks.

=== Professional career ===
He was made a Stage 3 player in the 2018-19 intake for the Scottish Rugby Academy, assigned to Glasgow Warriors.

He played for Stirling Wolves in the Super 6.

He made his debut for Glasgow Warriors in the 2021-22 season, playing in the pre-season friendly against Newcastle Falcons on 3 September 2021, replacing Murray McCallum in the match on 51 minutes. He also played in the pre-season match against Worcester Warriors, on the 10 September 2021.

He made his competitive debut for the provincial side on 2 October 2021, against the South African side Sharks, again replacing McCallum at tighthead prop. Walker earned the Glasgow Warrior No. 334.

=== International career ===
He played for Scotland at U18 and u19 grades.

Walker played for the Scotland U20 side in 2018 and 2019, playing in the World U20 world championships.

He was capped by Scotland 'A' on 25 June 2022 in their match against Chile.

He was capped by Scotland against Fiji on 5 November 2022.

=== Coaching career ===
He joined the Glasgow Hawks as a Scrum Coach in 2023.

He was announced as a Scrum Coach at Glasgow Hawks in 2025.

== Farming career ==
Walker grew up on the family farm.

His work on the farm was highlighted by The Times newspaper reporting on Walker repairing a road with a forklift and gravel chips.
