= Hamish Bain =

Scottish rugby union player

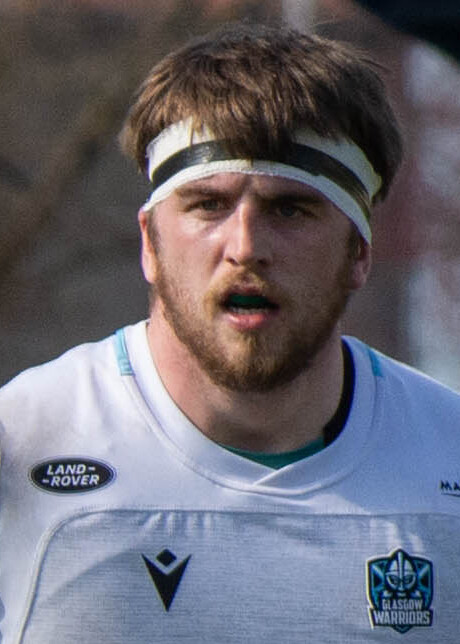
- Born: 24 September 1997 (age 29) Edinburgh, Scotland
- Height: 2.00 m (6 ft 6 1/2 in)
- Weight: 117 kg (18.4 st; 258 lb)

Rugby union career
- Position: Lock
Amateur team(s)
Years	Team	Apps	(Points)
2016-present	Currie		
2018–20	Stade Niçois	37	(15)
Senior career
Years	Team	Apps	(Points)
2017-18	Edinburgh Rugby	0	(0)
2020–22	Glasgow Warriors	7	(0)
2022–23	Jersey Reds		
2023-24	Vannes	13	(5)
Super Rugby
Years	Team	Apps	(Points)
2020–22	Boroughmuir Bears		
International career
Years	Team	Apps	(Points)
2016–17	Scotland U20s	9	(0)
2018	Scotland Club XV	1	(0)

Hamish Bain (born 24 September 1997) is a Scotland Club XV international rugby union player. He currently plays for Vannes and previously played for the Glasgow Warriors. His preferred position is lock.

== Rugby Union career ==
=== Amateur career ===
Bain played for Currie in the Tennent's Premiership. He was enrolled in the Scottish Rugby Academy in 2015 as a Stage 1 player and advanced to Stage 2 in 2016.

Bain spent two seasons at Stade Niçois from 2018 to 2020, through a partnership with Scottish Rugby.

=== Professional career ===
As part of the Scottish Rugby Academy, Bain was assigned to Edinburgh Rugby as a Stage 3 player in September 2017.

Bain signed for Glasgow Warriors in July 2020. He made his Glasgow Warriors debut in Round 3 of the 2020–21 Pro14 against Ospreys. He is Glasgow Warrior No. 315.

When not playing for the Glasgow Warriors, he played for Boroughmuir Bears in the Super Series.

He joined Jersey Reds in the summer of 2022.

He joined Vannes in the summer of 2023.

=== International career ===
Bain has played for Scotland U20s. He has also represented the Scotland Club XV international side, playing against the U20 side.
