= Logan Trotter =

Scottish rugby union player (born 1998)

- Born: Logan John Trotter; 27 September 1998 (age 28) Harrogate, England
- Height: 1.87 m (6 ft 2 in)
- Weight: 97 kg (15 st 4 lb)

Rugby union career
- Position(s): Wing, Fullback
Amateur team(s)
Years	Team	Apps	(Points)
-	Stirling County		
Senior career
Years	Team	Apps	(Points)
2018-22	Glasgow Warriors	0	(0)
2022–23	London Irish	7	(10)
2023-	Glasgow Warriors	4	(10)
2025	→ Coventry	8	(20)
Super Rugby
Years	Team	Apps	(Points)
2019-22	Stirling Wolves	15	(50)
International career
Years	Team	Apps	(Points)
2016-18	Scotland U20	10	(20)

Logan Trotter (born 27 September 1998) is a Scottish rugby union player. He plays for Glasgow Warriors in the United Rugby Championship, but is now on loan to Coventry. Trotter's primary positions are fullback and wing. He previously played for London Irish, Glasgow Warriors and Stirling Wolves.

== Rugby Union career ==
=== Amateur career ===
Trotter moved to Scotland at the age of 5. He played for Stirling County from P3 all through the age grades and making his 1st XV team debut aged 18 in the Scottish Premiership.

=== Professional career ===
He joined the Scottish Rugby Academy in 2018 was assigned to Glasgow Warriors.

Logan played for Stirling Wolves in the Super 6.

He played for Glasgow Warriors against Edinburgh Rugby in the 'best of the Super 6' friendly on 18 June 2022.

He signed for London Irish in 2022.

After London Irish went into administration, Trotter re-signed for Glasgow Warriors on 18 July 2023.

He joined Coventry on loan on 27 March 2025.

=== International career ===
He was capped by the Scotland U20s in 2017. He played in the u20s World Cup in 2018.

He trained with Scotland 7s in 2021.
