= Ben Muncaster =

Scottish rugby union player

- Born: 14 October 2001 (age 25) North Berwick
- Height: 1.91 m (6 ft 3 in)
- Weight: 110 kg (240 lb; 17 st 5 lb)
- School: Loretto School / Rugby School

Rugby union career
- Position: Flanker / Number 8
- Current team: Edinburgh Rugby
Senior career
Years	Team	Apps	(Points)
2021–	Edinburgh Rugby	30	(15)
- Correct as of 29 April 2024
International career
Years	Team	Apps	(Points)
2021	Scotland U20	5	(5)
2022–	Scotland 'A'	2	(0)
2024–	Scotland	3	(0)
- Correct as of 24 November 2024

Ben Muncaster (born 14 October 2001) is a Scottish rugby union player who plays as a back row for Edinburgh Rugby in the United Rugby Championship and the Scotland national team.

== Club career ==
Muncaster signed for Edinburgh academy in June 2020, having previously been a member of the Leicester Tigers academy. He made his Pro14 debut in Round 1 of the Pro14 Rainbow Cup against Zebre.

== International career ==
Muncaster was capped by Scotland A on 25 June 2022 in their match against Chile.

In October 2024, Muncaster was called-up to the senior Scotland national rugby union team for the first time under head coach Gregor Townsend. He made his senior debut in Scotland's autumn international match against Portugal on 16 November 2024, starting the match at openside flanker.
