= Dan Gamble =

Scottish rugby union player

- Born: Dan Gamble Kelso, Scotland
- Height: 1.85 m (6 ft 1 in)
- Weight: 118 kg (18 st 8 lb)
- School: Kelso High School, Merchiston Castle School

Rugby union career
- Position: Tighthead Prop
- Current team: Edinburgh Rugby
Senior career
Years	Team	Apps	(Points)
2020–2023	Edinburgh Rugby	3	(0)
2023	→ Edinburgh 'A'	1	(0)
- Correct as of 26 April 2023

Dan Gamble is a Scottish rugby union player who last played for Edinburgh Rugby in the United Rugby Championship.

== Rugby Union career ==
=== Professional career ===
Gamble is a member of Edinburgh's rugby academy. He made his debut for Edinburgh in Round 5 of the 2020–21 Pro14 against Cardiff Blues.
