= Euan McLaren =

UAE international rugby union player

- Born: 21 January 1999 (age 27) Paisley, Scotland
- Height: 1.88 m (6 ft 2 in)
- Weight: 118 kg (18 st 8 lb)
- School: Dollar Academy

Rugby union career
- Position: Prop
Amateur team(s)
| Years | Team | Apps | (Points) |
| 2017-19 | Ayr | | |
| 2024- | Heriots | | |
Senior career
| Years | Team | Apps | (Points) |
| 2017-20 | Glasgow Warriors | 0 | (0) |
| 2020-21 | Kowloon | | |
Super Rugby
| Years | Team | Apps | (Points) |
| 2019-20 | Ayrshire Bulls | | |
| 2021-22 | Southern Knights | | |
| 2022-24 | Heriots | | |
International career
| Years | Team | Apps | (Points) |
- Scotland U16
- Scotland U18
| 2019-22 | Scotland U20 | | |
| 2024 | UAE | | |

Euan McLaren (born 21 January 1999) is a UAE international rugby union player. He now plays for Heriots. He previously played for Glasgow Warriors, Ayrshire Bulls, Southern Knights and Kowloon.

== Rugby Union career ==
=== Amateur career ===
He was born in Paisley for the first 6 years of his life but schooled in Dubai. He returned to Scotland for his last two years of schooling and went to Dollar Academy.

He was playing for Ayr when he joined the Glasgow Warriors academy. He won the Scottish Cup and Premiership with the Ayr club.

He now plays for Heriots in the Scottish Premiership.

=== Professional career ===
He entered the Glasgow Warriors academy in 2017.

From playing with Ayr, he graduated to playing for their professional side Ayrshire Bulls in the Super 6.

He played for Kowloon in the Hong Kong Premiership.

He played for Southern Knights in the Super 6.

He moved to play for the professional Heriots team in the Super 6. When the Super 6 league folded, he then turned out for the Heriots amateur side.

=== International career ===
He played for Scotland U16.

He captained the Scotland U18 side.

He was capped for Scotland U20.

Due to his schooling in Dubai he was eligible for the United Arab Emirates. He was capped for UAE in 2024.
