= Marshall Sykes =

Scotland international rugby union player

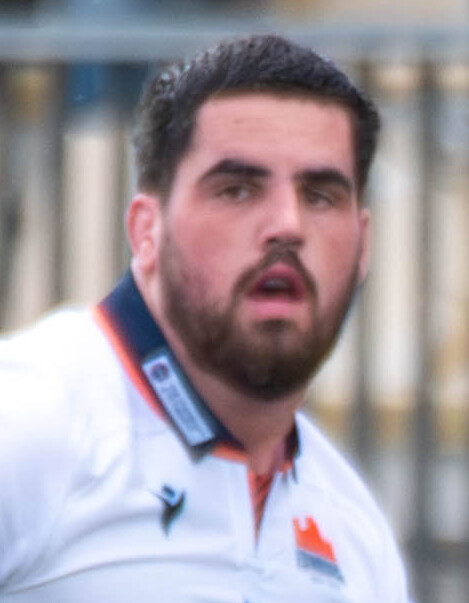
- Born: Marshall Sykes; 29 December 1999 (age 26) Woodbridge, Suffolk, England
- Height: 2.00 m (6 ft 7 in)
- Weight: 121 kg (267 lb; 19 st 1 lb)

Rugby union career
- Position: Lock
Senior career
Years	Team	Apps	(Points)
2019–2020	Glasgow Warriors	0	(0)
2020–	Edinburgh Rugby	62	(5)
- Correct as of 24 November 2024
International career
Years	Team	Apps	(Points)
2018–2019	Scotland U20	10	(0)
2021	Scotland	4	(0)
2024	Scotland A	1	(0)
- Correct as of 20 March 2025

Marshall Sykes (born 29 December 1999) is a Scottish professional rugby union player who plays as a lock for Edinburgh Rugby in the United Rugby Championship and the Scotland national team.

== Club career ==
Skyes began his professional career in the Scottish Rugby Academy and was part of the Glasgow Warriors academy as a Stage 3 player. He played for Ayrshire Bulls in the Super 6 league. Sykes then signed for Edinburgh in June 2020, He made his Pro14 debut in the final round of the 2019–20 Pro14 against Glasgow Warriors.

== International career ==
In October 2021 he was called up to the Scotland squad for the Autumn internationals. He made his Scotland debut against Tonga on 30 October 2021. Scotland won the match 60–14.
