= Connor Boyle =

Scottish rugby union player

- Born: Connor Boyle; 19 February 2000 (age 26) Livingston, Scotland
- Height: 1.83 m (6 ft 0 in)
- Weight: 96 kg (15 st 2 lb)

Rugby union career
- Position: Flanker
- Current team: Edinburgh Rugby
Senior career
Years	Team	Apps	(Points)
2020–	Edinburgh Rugby	42	(30)
- Correct as of 17 April 2025
International career
Years	Team	Apps	(Points)
2018–2020	Scotland U20	16	(20)
- Correct as of 31 May 2022

Connor Boyle (born 19 February 2000) is a Scottish rugby union player who currently plays for Edinburgh Rugby in the United Rugby Championship.

== Rugby Union career ==
=== Professional career ===
Boyle came through the Edinburgh academy, signing his first professional contract in July 2020. He made his debut for Edinburgh in Round 3 of the 2020–21 Pro14 against Connacht.
