= Roan Frostwick =

Scottish rugby union player

- Born: 21 July 2000 (age 26) Scotland
- Height: 1.75 m (5 ft 9 in)
- Weight: 82 kg (181 lb; 12 st 13 lb)
- School: North Berwick High School

Rugby union career
- Position: Scrum-half
- Current team: Edinburgh
Senior career
Years	Team	Apps	(Points)
2020–21	Edinburgh	2	(0)
- Correct as of 31 August 2020
International career
Years	Team	Apps	(Points)
2019–20	Scotland U20	14	(0)
- Correct as of 31 August 2020

Roan Frostwick (born 21 July 2000) is a Scottish rugby union player for Edinburgh in the Pro14. Frostwick's primary position is scrum-half.

== Rugby Union career ==
Prior to his professional career Frostwick played for North Berwick Rugby Club and Currie Chieftains. Frostwick has also made a number of appearances for Watsonians Rugby Club in the FOSROC SUPER6 campaign.

=== Professional career ===
Frostwick signed for Edinburgh academy in June 2020. He made his Pro14 debut in the final round of the 2019–20 Pro14 against Glasgow Warriors.

Frostwick in November 2021 was put on loan to English Championship side Ampthill Rugby Club, to gain valuable game time. He made his debut for Ampthill on the 4th of December. Frostwick started consistently for the Ampthill side until Edinburgh required him back in early February 2022. Later, winning the Super6 Sprint Series campaign with Watsonians.

In early June 2022, Frostwick moved to Sydney Australia to play for Shute Shield side, Warringah. It is believed Frostwick returned to the Scottish Capital after the 21/22 Shute Shield season came to an end in early September to join up with Edinburgh Rugby again, whilst turning out for top of the table Super6 side, Watsonians.
