= Gregor Brown =

Scottish rugby union player (born 2001)

- Born: Gregor Brown; 1 July 2001 (age 25) Aberdeen, Scotland
- Height: 1.93 m (6 ft 4 in)
- Weight: 109 kg (240 lb; 17 st 2 lb)
- School: Robert Gordon's College
- Notable relative: Blair Kinghorn (cousin)

Rugby union career
- Position: Lock / Flanker
Amateur team(s)
Years	Team	Apps	(Points)
- Gordonians
Senior career
Years	Team	Apps	(Points)
2021–	Glasgow Warriors	47	(10)
- Correct as of 24 October 2022
Super Rugby
Years	Team	Apps	(Points)
2019-	Boroughmuir Bears		
International career
Years	Team	Apps	(Points)
- Scotland U18
2020–	Scotland U20	5	(0)
2024-	Scotland	22	(5)
2025	British & Irish Lions	0	(0)
- Correct as of 18 November 2026

Gregor Brown (born 1 July 2001) is a Scottish professional rugby union player for Glasgow Warriors in the URC and the Scotland national team. Brown's primary position is lock or flanker.

== Rugby Union career ==
=== Amateur career ===
Brown was a pupil at Robert Gordon's College in Aberdeen and played rugby for them.

He also played for Aberdeen side Gordonians.

=== Professional career ===
He joined the Boroughmuir Bears for the 2019-20 season of the Super 6 tournament.

Brown was named as a member of the Glasgow Warriors academy for the 2020–21 season. He made his debut for Glasgow Warriors in Round 13 of the 2020–21 Pro14 against Leinster. He became Glasgow Warrior No. 324.

=== International career ===
He has represented Scotland U18; and made his debut for the Scotland U20 side in the opening fixture of the 2020 U20 Six Nations tournament.

In June 2024 Brown was called up to the senior Scotland squad for a tour of The Americas.

He made his Scotland debut against Canada on 6 July 2024 at TD Place Stadium in Ottawa. Scotland won the match 73 points to 12. Brown has the Scotland no. 1221.

==== British & Irish Lions ====
Brown was called up for the 2025 British & Irish Lions tour to Australia following the first test, and was named in the squad for the midweek fixture against a Pasifika XV He made an appearance in the final midweek match against the Pasifika XV, becoming Lion #887.
