= Dan Winning =

Scottish rugby union player

- Born: Daniel Murray Winning; 25 November 1997 (age 28) South Africa
- Height: 185 cm (6 ft 1 in)
- Weight: 118 kg (18 st 8 lb)

Rugby union career
- Position: Prop
- Current team: Edinburgh
Senior career
| Years | Team | Apps | (Points) |
| 2020– | Edinburgh | 1 | (0) |
- Correct as of 15 March 2020
Super Rugby
| Years | Team | Apps | (Points) |
| 2019 | Boroughmuir Bears | | |

Dan Winning (born 25 November 1997) is a Scottish rugby union player for Edinburgh in the Pro14. Winning's primary position is prop.

== Rugby Union career ==
=== Professional career ===
Winning made his debut for Edinburgh on 21 February 2020.
