= Shaun Gunn =

Scottish rugby union player

- Born: 29 June 1998 (age 28) Scotland
- Height: 1.89 m (6 ft 2 in)
- Weight: 119 kg (262 lb; 18 st 10 lb)

Rugby union career
- Position: Prop
- Current team: Edinburgh Rugby
Senior career
Years	Team	Apps	(Points)
2021	Edinburgh Rugby	1	(0)
- Correct as of 1 June 2022
International career
Years	Team	Apps	(Points)
2018	Scotland U20	5	(5)
- Correct as of 1 June 2022

Shaun Gunn (born 29 June 1998) is a Scottish rugby union player who most recently played for Edinburgh Rugby in the United Rugby Championship. Gunn's primary position is prop.

== Rugby Union career ==
=== Professional career ===
Gunn signed for Edinburgh academy in June 2020. He made his Pro14 debut in the rearranged Round 7 of the 2020–21 Pro14 against the Dragons, coming on as a replacement.
