= Harry Paterson =

Scottish rugby union player

- Born: 28 June 2001 (age 25) Edinburgh, Scotland
- Height: 1.88 m (6 ft 2 in)
- Weight: 93 kg (205 lb; 14 st 9 lb)
- School: Fettes College

Rugby union career
- Position(s): Wing, Fullback
- Current team: Edinburgh
Senior career
Years	Team	Apps	(Points)
2021–	Edinburgh	20	(5)
- Correct as of 24 March 2024
International career
Years	Team	Apps	(Points)
2020	Scotland U20	3	(2)
2022	Scotland 7s	5	(0)
2024–	Scotland	3	(5)
2026-	Scotland 'A'	1	(0)

Harry Paterson (born 28 June 2001) is a Scotland international rugby union player who plays as a fullback for United Rugby Championship club Edinburgh

== Club career ==
Educated at Fettes College, Paterson signed for Edinburgh Rugby in June 2020. He made his Pro14 debut in Round 4 of the Pro14 Rainbow Cup against Ulster.

== International career ==
Paterson made his international debut for Scotland 7s at the Singapore International 7s competition in April 2022, making 1 appearance. He made his second appearance at the Vancouver International 7s the following week.

After a string of strong performances early in the 2023/24 season, Paterson earned his first call-up to the Scotland squad for the 2024 Six Nations Championship.

Paterson made his international debut for Scotland against France in the 2024 Six Nations Championship, having been called up to start when Kyle Steyn’s wife went into labour on match day. After the match, which Scotland lost 16-20, Scotland Head Coach Gregor Townsend hailed Paterson's first appearance ‘one of the best debuts I’ve ever seen’.

He played for Scotland 'A' on 6 February 2026 in their match against Italy XV.
