= Matt Currie =

Scottish rugby union player

- Born: Matthew Currie; 22 February 2001 (age 25) Scotland
- Height: 191 cm (6 ft 3 in)
- Weight: 95 kg (209 lb; 14 st 13 lb)

Rugby union career
- Position: Centre
- Current team: Edinburgh Rugby
Senior career
| Years | Team | Apps | (Points) |
| 2021– | Edinburgh Rugby | 40 | (35) |
| 2023 | → Edinburgh 'A' | 1 | (5) |
- Correct as of 24 November 2024
International career
| Years | Team | Apps | (Points) |
| 2020 | Scotland U20 | 5 | (0) |
| 2022– | Scotland 'A' | 2 | (0) |
| 2024– | Scotland | 4 | (5) |
- Correct as of 24 November 2024

Matt Currie (born 22 February 2001) is a Scotland international rugby union player who currently plays for Edinburgh Rugby in the United Rugby Championship.

== Rugby Union career ==
=== Professional career ===
Currie signed for Edinburgh academy in June 2020. He made his Pro14 debut in Round 12 of the 2020–21 Pro14 against Munster, coming on as a replacement.

=== International career ===
In June 2024 Currie was called up to the senior Scotland squad for a tour of The Americas.

He made his Scotland debut against Canada on 6 July 2024 at TD Place Stadium in Ottawa. Scotland won the match 73 points to 12. Currie has the Scotland no. 1224.
