= Scottish Rugby Academy =

Rugby union structure in Scotland

- Established: 2015
- Owner: Scottish Rugby Union
- Location: Scotland

The Scottish Rugby Academy, for sponsorship reasons the Fosroc Scottish Rugby Academy, is a national academy structure designed to give Scotland's young rugby stars a pathway into the professional game.
