= 2024–25 Glasgow Warriors season =

Glasgow Warriors 2024–2025
- Ground: Scotstoun Stadium (Capacity: 7,351)
- Coach: (South Africa) Franco Smith
- Captain: (Scotland) Kyle Steyn
- Most caps: (Scotland) Alex Samuel (25)
- Top scorer: (Scotland) George Horne (102)
- Most tries: (Scotland) George Horne (13)
- League(s): United Rugby Championship; European Rugby Champions Cup
- 2024-25: URC: 4th (ladder) semi-finals (play-offs); URC Shield: Winner (3rd); 1872 Cup: Winner (11th); ERCC: quarter-finals
1st kit	2nd kit

The 2024–25 season saw Glasgow Warriors compete in the United Rugby Championship as reigning champions, and also in the European Champions Cup. In addition to the two main competitions, Glasgow also competed for the URC Scottish-x-Italian Shield and the 1872 Cup within the overall URC, where again, they were the reigning champion in both competitions from the previous season.

Glasgow's defence of the United Rugby Championship made it as far as the semi-finals of the play-offs, where their run was ended by Leinster, the team that also eliminated Glasgow in the quarter-finals of the European Rugby Champions Cup. Glasgow did, however retain both the URC Scottish-x-Italian Shield and the 1872 Cup.

== Summary ==
Glasgow began the defence of their United Rugby Championship title with a narrow 19-20 defeat against Irish rivals Ulster, but recovered to post three heavy victories in matches against Benetton, Cardiff and Zebre Parma. A tour of South Africa reaped seven points, with a high scoring, narrow loss in Durban to the Sharks was off-set by a comfortable win against the Stormers.

Glasgow won the 2024-25 edition of the 1872 Cup with an aggregate 40–24 victory over two legs against Edinburgh Rugby in front of a record combined attendance of 67,621 fans, over the Christmas and New Year fixture list after both teams won their home leg in the 'national stadium' of their city - Murrayfield for Edinburgh and Hampden Park for Glasgow. The victory was Glasgow's eleventh title.

In the European competition, Glasgow emerged from their group in second place, winning the seventh seeding and a home tie in the Round of 16 against Leicester Tigers from England's Gallagher Premiership.

== Season overview ==
The Academy announcement saw Richie Simpson and Duncan Munn integrated into this season's academy structure. Harris McLeod, Ruaraidh Hart and Logan Jarvie dropped out of the academy.

== Team ==
=== Coaches ===
- Head coach: (South Africa) Franco Smith
- Assistant coach: (Scotland) Peter Murchie
- Assistant coach: (Scotland) Peter Horne
- Assistant coach: (Ireland) Nigel Carolan
- Scrum Coach: (Scotland) Alasdair Dickinson
- Head Strength and Conditioning Coach: (Ireland) Cillian Reardon
- Senior Athletic Performance Coach: Damien O'Donoghue
- Sport Scientist: Robin Reidy
- Lead Performance Analyst: Greg Woolard
- Asst. Performance Analyst: Eilidh Wright
- Asst. Performance Analyst: Aidan FitzGerald

=== Staff ===
- Managing Director: Alastair Kellock
- Chairman: Charles Shaw
- Advisory Group: Walter Malcolm, Douglas McCrea, Alan Lees, Paul Taylor, Frank Mitchell, Scott Mathieson
- Rugby Operations Manager: Kenny Brown
- Assistant Operations Manager: Martin Malone
- Kit & Equipment Manager: Dougie Mills
- Head groundsman: Colin McKinnon
- Team Doctor: Neil Howie
- Clinical Manager and Lead Physiotherapist: Andrew Boag
- Senior Team Physiotherapist: Hene Branders
- Senior Team Physiotherapist: Michael Clark
- Junior Physiotherapist: Christina Finlay
- Communications and Marketing Manager: Cameron MacAllister
- Marketing manager: Claire Scott
- Event Manager: Duncan Seller
- Content Producer: Robyn Struthers
- Administrator: Jana Tobin
- Communications Manager: Craig Wright
- Communications Assistant: Molly Mitchell
- Commercial Manager: Jamie Robertson
- Lead Account Manager: Omar Muhyeddeen
- Partnership Account Manager: Catherine Bunch
- Sponsorship Co-Ordinator: Megan Kennedy
- Community Manager: Stuart Lewis
- Business Club Manager: Adam Ashe

=== Squad ===
Hookers (Scotland) Angus Fraser (Scotland) Gregor Hiddleston (Scotland) Johnny Matthews (Scotland) Grant Stewart Props (Scotland) Jamie Bhatti (Scotland) Allan Dell (Scotland) Zander Fagerson (Scotland) Nathan McBeth (Scotland) Fin Richardson (Namibia) Patrick Schickerling (Scotland) Rory Sutherland (Australia) Sam Talakai (Scotland) Murphy Walker Locks (Scotland) Scott Cummings (Scotland) Jare Oguntibeju (South Africa) JP du Preez (Scotland) Richie Gray (Scotland) Alex Samuel (Scotland) Max Williamson	Loose Forwards (Scotland) Gregor Brown (Scotland) Rory Darge (Scotland) Jack Dempsey (Scotland) Matt Fagerson (Scotland) Euan Ferrie (Scotland) Jack Mann (Scotland) Ally Miller (Tonga) Sione Vailanu (South Africa) Henco Venter Scrum halves (Scotland) Ben Afshar (Scotland) Jamie Dobie (Scotland) George Horne (Scotland) Sean Kennedy Fly halves (Scotland) Adam Hastings (Scotland) Tom Jordan (Scotland) Duncan Weir	Centres (Scotland) Huw Jones (Scotland) Stafford McDowall (Scotland) Duncan Munn (Scotland) Kyle Steyn (Scotland) Sione Tuipulotu Back Three (Argentina) Sebastián Cancelliere (Argentina) Facundo Cordero (New Zealand) Josh McKay (Scotland) Kyle Rowe (Scotland) Ollie Smith (Scotland) Logan Trotter

=== Academy ===
==== Scottish Rugby Academy Stage 3 players ====
These players are given a professional contract by the Scottish Rugby Academy. Although given placements they are not contracted by Glasgow Warriors. Players graduate from the academy when a professional club contract is offered.

These players are assigned to Glasgow Warriors for the season 2024–25.

Academy players promoted in the course of the season are listed with the main squad.

- (Scotland) Tom Banatvala – Prop
- (Scotland) Callum Norrie – Prop
- (Scotland) Callum Smyth – Prop
- (Scotland) Jake Shearar – Prop
- (Scotland) Oliver McKenna – Hooker
- (Scotland) Joe Roberts – Hooker
- (Scotland) Ryan Burke – Lock
- (Scotland) Dan Halkon – Lock
- (Scotland) Macenzzie Duncan – Flanker
- (Scotland) Archie McMichael – Flanker
- (Scotland) Jonny Morris – Flanker
- (Scotland) Rory Purvis – Flanker
- (Scotland) Brent Jackson - Scrum half
- (Scotland) Richie Simpson - Fly half
- (Scotland) Matthew Urwin – Fly half
- (Scotland) Alex Brydon - Centre
- (Scotland) Ben Salmon – Centre
- (Scotland) Johnny Ventisei – Centre
- (Scotland) Kerr Yule – Centre
- (Scotland) Amena Caqusau – Wing
- (Scotland) Aidan Cross – Wing
- (Scotland) Kerr Johnston – Wing
- (Scotland) Harry Provan – Wing
- (Scotland) Fergus Watson – Full Back

==== Back up players ====
Other players used by Glasgow Warriors over the course of the season.

- (Scotland) Cairn Ramsay - Prop
- (Hong Kong) Callum McFeat Smith - Prop
- (Scotland) Jamie Stewart - Prop
- (Scotland) Seb Stephen - Hooker
- (Scotland) Joss Arnold - Lock
- (Scotland) Murray Oliver - Lock
- (Scotland) James Pow - Lock
- (Scotland) Mac Rutherford - Lock
- (Scotland) Ollie Duncan - Flanker
- (Scotland) Ruaraidh Hart - Flanker
- (Scotland) Ben Curtis – Scrum half
- (Scotland) Cameron Van Wyk – Scrum half
- (Scotland) Jack Oliver – Scrum half

== Player statistics ==
During the 2024–25 season, Glasgow have used 48 different players in competitive games. The table below shows the number of appearances and points scored by each player.

Position	Nation	Name	United Rugby Championship			Champions Cup			Total	
Position	Nation	Name	Apps (sub)	Tries	Points kicked	Apps (sub)	Tries	Points kicked	Apps (sub)	Total Pts
HK	(Scotland)	Angus Fraser	(5)	0	0	(2)	0	0	(7)	0
HK	(Scotland)	Gregor Hiddleston	6(7)	0	0	2(2)	0	0	8(9)	0
HK	(Scotland)	Johnny Matthews	9(8)	8	0	4(2)	1	0	13(10)	45
HK	(Scotland)	Seb Stephen	1	0	0	0	0	0	1	0
HK	(Scotland)	Grant Stewart	3(5)	2	0	(2)	0	0	3(7)	10
PR	(Scotland)	Jamie Bhatti	11(2)	0	0	2(4)	0	0	13(6)	0
PR	(Scotland)	Allan Dell	(1)	0	0	0	0	0	(1)	0
PR	(Scotland)	Zander Fagerson	5(3)	0	0	4(1)	0	0	9(4)	0
PR	(Scotland)	Nathan McBeth	4(9)	4	0	2	0	0	6(9)	20
PR	(Scotland)	Fin Richardson	7	0	0	0	0	0	7	0
PR	(Namibia)	Patrick Schickerling	5(5)	2	0	(1)	0	0	5(6)	10
PR	(Scotland)	Rory Sutherland	1(6)	0	0	2(2)	0	0	3(8)	0
PR	(Australia)	Sam Talakai	4(10)	0	0	2(4)	0	0	6(14)	0
PR	(Scotland)	Murphy Walker	1(2)	0	0	0	0	0	1(2)	0
LK	(Scotland)	Scott Cummings	7(4)	0	0	3(1)	1	0	10(5)	5
LK	(South Africa)	JP du Preez	1(4)	0	0	1(1)	0	0	2(5)	0
LK	(Scotland)	Richie Gray	3(1)	0	0	0	0	0	3(1)	0
LK	(Scotland)	Jare Oguntibeju	6(1)	0	0	2	1	0	8(1)	5
LK	(Scotland)	Alex Samuel	12(7)	0	0	2(4)	0	0	14(11)	0
LK	(Scotland)	Max Williamson	5(5)	0	0	(1)	0	0	5(6)	0
BR	(Scotland)	Gregor Brown	7(4)	0	0	3(1)	0	0	10(5)	0
BR	(Scotland)	Rory Darge	9(3)	3	0	5(1)	1	0	14(4)	20
BR	(Scotland)	Jack Dempsey	4	0	0	1	0	0	5	0
BR	(Scotland)	Macenzzie Duncan	1(2)	0	0	0	0	0	1(2)	0
BR	(Scotland)	Matt Fagerson	7(1)	3	0	5(1)	0	0	12(2)	15
BR	(Scotland)	Euan Ferrie	10(4)	1	0	1(3)	0	0	11(7)	5
BR	(Scotland)	Jack Mann	9(1)	2	0	2(1)	0	0	11(2)	10
BR	(Scotland)	Ally Miller	4(2)	0	0	(1)	0	0	4(3)	0
BR	(Tonga)	Sione Vailanu	4(1)	0	0	2	2	0	6(1)	10
BR	(South Africa)	Henco Venter	7(3)	4	0	3(1)	2	0	10(4)	30
SH	(Scotland)	Ben Afshar	3(7)	1	0	1(3)	0	0	4(10)	5
SH	(Scotland)	Jamie Dobie	8(5)	7	0	4(2)	1	0	12(7)	40
SH	(Scotland)	George Horne	11(3)	8	27	4(1)	5	10	15(4)	102
SH	(Scotland)	Sean Kennedy	(2)	0	0	0	0	0	(2)	0
FH	(Scotland)	Adam Hastings	9(5)	1	40	2	1	13	11(5)	63
FH	(Scotland)	Tom Jordan	11(3)	2	22	5(1)	1	6	16(4)	43
FH	(Scotland)	Duncan Weir	3(5)	1	38	1(3)	0	5	4(8)	48
CE	(Scotland)	Huw Jones	7	5	0	3	1	0	10	30
CE	(Scotland)	Stafford McDowall	10(1)	2	0	4	0	0	14(1)	10
CE	(Scotland)	Duncan Munn	3	0	0	0	0	0	3	0
CE	(Scotland)	Sione Tuipulotu	9	2	0	3	1	0	12	15
WG	(Argentina)	Sebastián Cancelliere	13(1)	3	0	3(2)	1	0	16(3)	20
WG	(Argentina)	Facundo Cordero	5(1)	1	0	0	0	0	5(1)	5
WG	(Scotland)	Kerr Johnston	(1)	0	0	0	0	0	(1)	0
WG	(Scotland)	Kyle Rowe	12(1)	5	0	5	1	0	17(1)	30
WG	(Scotland)	Kyle Steyn	11	6	0	3	0	0	14	30
FB	(New Zealand)	Josh McKay	10	1	0	4	1	0	14	10
FB	(Scotland)	Ollie Smith	7	0	0	0	0	0	7	0

== Staff movements ==
=== Medical ===
==== Personnel in ====
- Neil Howie from Scotland U20

==== Personnel out ====
- Jonathan Hanson to Scotland

== Player movements ==
=== Academy promotions ===
- (Scotland) Jare Oguntibeju from Scottish Rugby Academy
- (Scotland) Duncan Munn from Scottish Rugby Academy

=== Player transfers ===
==== In ====
- (Namibia) Patrick Schickerling from (England) Exeter Chiefs
- (Scotland) Rory Sutherland from (France) Oyonnax
- (Scotland) Adam Hastings from (England) Gloucester
- (Scotland) Fin Richardson to (Scotland) Glasgow Warriors
- (Australia) Sam Talakai to (Scotland) Glasgow Warriors

==== Out ====
- (Scotland) Ali Price to (Scotland) Edinburgh
- (Scotland) Fraser Brown retired
- (Scotland) Ross Thompson to (Scotland) Edinburgh
- (Scotland) Oli Kebble to (France) Oyonnax
- (Scotland) George Turner to (Japan) Kobelco Kobe Steelers
- (Scotland) Thomas Gordon to (England) Newcastle Falcons
- (Argentina) Lucio Sordoni to (France) Racing 92
- (Argentina) Enrique Pieretto to (France) Provence Rugby
- (South Africa) Sintu Manjezi released
- (Scotland) Harris McLeod to (United States) Chicago Lions
- (Scotland) Logan Jarvie to (United States) Chicago Lions
- (Scotland) Allan Dell released
- (Scotland) Aidan Cross to (England) Doncaster Knights (loan)
- (Scotland) Kerr Johnston to (England) Ampthill (loan)
- (Scotland) Callum Norrie to (England) Ampthill (loan)
- (Scotland) Logan Trotter to (England) Coventry (loan)

== Competitions ==
=== Pre-season and friendlies ===
A pre-season friendly against Zebre in Italy has been announced. A further match against Connacht has been announced at Scotstoun.

==== Match 1 ====
30 August 2024
7.30pm

Zebre Parma (Italy)	31 - 0	(Scotland) Glasgow Warriors
Try: Alessandro Fusco; Albert Batista; Giampietro Ribaldi; Filippo Bozzoni; Gerónimo Prisciantelli; Con: Giovanni Montemauri x 2 Gerónimo Prisciantelli	Preview; Report; Report; Report

Stadio Sergio Lanfranchi
Referee: Filippo Russo (FIR)

Zebre: 15. Geronimo Prisciantelli, 14. Ben Cambriani, 13. Giulio Bertaccini (Valorugby Emilia), 12. Enrico Lucchin, 11. Albert Einstein Batista (HBS Colorno), 10. Giovanni Montemauri, 9. Alessandro Fusco, 8. Giovanni Licata (Cap), 7. Samuele Locatelli (Rugby Viadana), 6. Davide Ruggeri, 5. Leonard Krumov, 4. Matteo Canali, 3. Juan Pitinari, 2. Tommaso Di Bartolomeo, 1. Muhamed Hasa
Replacements: Giampietro Ribaldi, Luca Rizzoli, Matteo Nocera, Francesco Ruffolo (HBS Colorno), Davide Salvan (Accademia Zebre Parma), Giacomo Ferrari, Luca Andreani, Giacomo Milano (Accademia Zebre Parma), Thomas Dominguez, Ratko Jelic, Simone Brisighella (Accademia Zebre Parma), Filippo Bozzoni, Luca Morisi, Scott Gregory, Alessandro Gesi (Accademia Zebre Parma)
Glasgow Warriors: 1. Jamie Bhatti, 2. Angus Fraser, 3. Patrick Schickerling, 4. Jare Oguntibehu, 5. Alex Samuel, 6. Euan Ferrie, 7. Henco Venter, 8. Jack Mann, 9. Ben Afshar, 10. Duncan Weir [captain], 11. Ben Salmon, 12. Tom Jordan, 13. Duncan Munn, 14. Logan Trotter, 15. Josh McKay
Replacements: Grant Stewart, Tom Banatvala, Callum McFeat Smith, Gregor Brown, Ryan Burke, Richie Simpson, Sean Kennedy, Amena Casqusau, Gregor Hiddleston, Fin Richardson, Macenzzie Duncan, Jamie Dobie, Johnny Ventisei, Kerr Johnston, Fergus Watson

==== Match 2 ====
7 September 2024
6pm

Glasgow Warriors (Scotland)	21 - 28	(Ireland) Connacht
Try: Tom Jordan; Angus Fraser; Gregor Brown; Con: Adam Hastings x 2 Tom Jordan	Preview; Report; Report; Report	Try: Dylan Tierney-Martin; David O’Connor; Shayne Bolton x 2 Con: Cathal Forde x 4

Scotstoun Stadium
Attendance: 6,226
Referee: Ruairidh Campbell (SRU)

Glasgow Warriors: 1 Rory Sutherland, 2 Angus Fraser, 3 Patrick Schickerling, 4 Jare Oguntibeju, 5 Richie Gray, 6 Euan Ferrie, 7 Henco Venter, 8 Jack Dempsey, 9 Ben Afshar, 10 Adam Hastings, 11 Kyle Rowe, 12 Tom Jordan, 13 Stafford McDowall (C), 14 Jamie Dobie, 15 Josh McKay
Replacements: Grant Stewart, Nathan McBeth, Fin Richardson, Max Williamson, Gregor Brown, Sean Kennedy, Duncan Weir, Duncan Munn, Joe Roberts, Jamie Bhatti, Macenzzie Duncan, Jack Mann, Ben Salmon, Logan Trotter, Sebastian Cancelliere
Connacht: 15. Piers O’Conor, 14. Shayne Bolton, 13. David Hawkshaw, 12. Cathal Forde, 11. Shane Jennings, 10. Josh Ioane, 9. Matthew Devine, 1. Denis Buckley, 2. Dylan Tierney-Martin, 3. Jack Aungier, 4. Joe Joyce (C), 5. Darragh Murray, 6. David O’Connor, 7. Conor Oliver, 8. Paul Boyle
Replacements: Adam McBurney, Jordan Duggan, Sam Illo, Niall Murray, Oisín Dowling, Oisín McCormack, Shamus Hurley-Langton, Ben Murphy, Jack Carty, John Porch, Finn Treacy, Mack Hansen

==== Match 3 ====
27 September 2024
7.35pm

Edinburgh 'A' (Scotland)	33 - 14	(Scotland) Glasgow Warriors 'A'
Try: Conor McAlpine; Jerry Blyth-Lafferty; Cammy Scott; Lewis Wells; Harri Morris; Con: Cammy Scott x 4	Preview	Try: Aidan Cross; Duncan Munn; Con: Matthew Urwin x 2

Edinburgh Rugby Stadium

Edinburgh A: Jack Brown; Archie Barbour, Sam Leweni, Fin Thomson, Lewis Wells; Cammy Scott (VC), Conor McAlpine; Mikey Jones, Harri Morris, Ollie Blyth-Lafferty, Euan McVie, Rob Carmichael, Pat Spence, Freddy Douglas, Connor Boyle ©
Replacements: Jerry Blyth-Lafferty, Angus McGregor, Archie Owlett, Dylan Jakeman, Hector Patterson, Isaac Coates, Jack Hocking, Jamie Thomson.
Glasgow Warriors A: Fergus Watson; Aidan Cross, Duncan Munn, Kerr Yule, Amena Caqusau; Matthew Urwin, Brent Jackson; Callum McFeat-Smith, Angus Fraser, Fin Richardson, Jare Oguntibeju, Joss Arnold, Joe Roberts, Macenzzie Duncan, Jack Mann
Replacements: Jake Shearer, Callum Norrie, Callum Smyth, Cairn Ramsay, Ben Curtis, Richie Simpson, Ben Salmon, Johnny Ventisei, Kerr Johnston, Harry Provan, Rory Purvis

==== Match 4 ====
6 May 2025
11am

Benetton U23 (Italy)	20 - 52	(Scotland) Glasgow Warriors U23
Try: Nicholas Gasperini; Cristiano Tizzano; Marco Scalabrin; Gianmarco Pietramala	Preview; Report; Report; Report; Report	Try: Richie Simpson; Kerr Yule x 2 Jack Oliver; Macenzzie Duncan; Kerr Johnston; Johnny Ventisei; Ryan Burke; Con: Richie Simpson x 4 Matthew Urwin x 2

La Ghirada

Benetton U23: 1 Federico Pisani, 2 Nicholas Gasperini (C), 3 Marcos Gallorini, 4 Samuele Mirenzi, 5 Bruno Felipe Schmidt, 6 Jadin Kingi, 7 Simon Koroiyadi, 8 Giacomo Milano, 9 Migael Prinsloo, 10 Gianmarco Pietramala, 11 Alessandro Drago, 12 Federico Zanandrea, 13 Federico Cuminetti, 14 Filippo Bozzoni, 15 Alessandro Gesi
Replacements: Nahuel Tetaz Chaparro, Destiny Aminu, Matteo Bellotto, Nicola Bolognini, Jacques Cloete, Nicolò Corvasce, Riccardo Favaretto, Riccardo Genovese, Enrico Pontarini, Davide Salvan, Marco Scalabrin, Cristiano Tizzano, Bruno Vallesi
:Glasgow Warriors U23: 15 Fergus Watson, 14 Ben Salmon, 13 Kerr Johnston, 12 Kerr Yule, 11 Amena Caqusau, 10 Richie Simpson, 9 Jack Oliver, 1 Jake Shearer, 2 Seb Stephen, 3 Callum Smyth, 4 Jare Oguntibeju, 5 Ryan Burke, 6 Macenzzie Duncan, 7 Angus Fraser (Captain), 8 Jonny Morris
Replacements: 16 Joe Roberts, 17 Callum McFeat Smith, 18 Jamie Stewart (Edinburgh), 19 Dan Halkon, 20 Tom Currie (Edinburgh), 21 Ollie Duncan (Edinburgh), 22 Sean Kennedy, 23 Matthew Urwin, 24 Johnny Ventisei

==== Match 5 ====
22 May 2025
3.30pm

Glasgow Warriors 'A' (Scotland)	14 - 26	(Georgia (country)) Black Lion
Try: Fergus Watson; Kerr Johnston; Con: Matthew Urwin x 2	Preview; Report; Report	Try: Alexander Todua x 2 Shalva Mamukashvili x 2 Con: Luka Tsirekidze x 3

Scotstoun Stadium
Referee: Rob McDowell

Glasgow Warriors 'A': Jake Shearer, Angus Fraser [captain], Callum Norrie, Dan Halkon, Ryan Burke, Macenzzie Duncan, Ollie Duncan, Jonny Morris, Sean Kennedy, Matthew Urwin, Facundo Cordero, Kerr Yule, Johnny Ventesi, Cameron Van Wyk, Fergus Watson
Replacements: Joe Roberts, Callum McFeat-Smith, Jamie Stewart, Mac Rutherford, Archie McMichael, Jack Oliver, Richie Simpson, Amena Caqusau, Brent Jackson, Kerr Johnson
Black Lion: 15. Otar Metreveli, 14. Akaki Tabutsadze, 13. Aleksandre Todua, 12. Demur Tapladze, 11. Shalva Aptsiauri, 10. Luka Tsirekidze, 9. Tengiz Peranidze, 1. Dato Abdushelishvili, 2. Irakli Kvatadze, 3. Bachuki Chumbadze, 4. Mikheil Babunashvili, 5. Vladimer Chachanidze, 6. Luka Ivanishvili (capt.), 7. Giorgi Kervalishvili, 8. Giorgi Sinauridze
Replacements: Nikoloz Khatiashvili, Vasil Kakovini, Tengiz Zamtaradze, Shalva Mamukashvili, Tamaz Chamiashvili, Kakhaber Darbaidze, Demur Epremidze, Giorgi Nikoladze, Guga Ghaniashvili; Nodar Dolidze, Davit Khuroshvili, Giorgi Babunashvili, Gela Kheladze, Amiran Shvangiradze, Zaur Lutidze

== United Rugby Championship ==
URC Standings

after 18 rounds.

Pos	Team	Pld	W	D	L	PF	PA	PD	TF	TA	TB	LB	Pts	Qualification
1	Leinster (CH)	18	16	0	2	542	256	+286	79	35	11	1	76	Qualifies for home URC quarter-final; Qualification for the 2025–26 Champions Cup
2	Bulls (RU)	18	14	0	4	542	361	+181	71	44	9	3	68	Qualifies for home URC quarter-final; Qualification for the 2025–26 Champions Cup
3	Sharks	18	13	0	5	436	402	+34	55	59	7	3	62	Qualifies for home URC quarter-final; Qualification for the 2025–26 Champions Cup
4	Glasgow Warriors	18	11	0	7	468	327	+141	70	40	10	5	59	Qualifies for home URC quarter-final; Qualification for the 2025–26 Champions Cup
5	Stormers	18	10	0	8	507	418	+89	66	57	11	4	55	Qualifies for URC quarter-final; Qualification for the 2025–26 Champions Cup
6	Munster	18	9	0	9	444	429	+15	67	59	11	4	51	Qualifies for URC quarter-final; Qualification for the 2025–26 Champions Cup
7	Edinburgh	18	8	1	9	471	407	+64	66	57	9	6	49	Qualifies for URC quarter-final; Qualification for the 2025–26 Champions Cup
8	Scarlets	18	9	1	8	427	382	+45	50	52	6	4	48	Qualifies for URC quarter-final; Qualification for the 2025–26 Champions Cup
9	Cardiff	18	8	1	9	409	477	−68	63	65	10	3	47	Qualification for the 2025–26 Challenge Cup
10	Benetton	18	9	1	8	393	478	−85	50	65	7	1	46	Qualification for the 2025–26 Challenge Cup
11	Lions	18	8	0	10	402	440	−38	53	60	5	3	40	Qualification for the 2025–26 Challenge Cup
12	Ospreys	18	7	1	10	437	454	−17	60	63	6	4	40	Qualification for the 2025–26 Challenge Cup
13	Connacht	18	6	0	12	420	472	−52	64	62	9	6	39	Qualification for the 2025–26 Challenge Cup
14	Ulster	18	7	0	11	414	506	−92	59	72	5	5	38	Qualification for the 2025–26 Challenge Cup
15	Zebre Parma	18	5	1	12	302	503	−201	38	72	3	4	29	Qualification for the 2025–26 Challenge Cup
16	Dragons	18	1	0	17	335	637	−302	43	92	1	4	9	Qualification for the 2025–26 Challenge Cup

Source: UnitedRugby.com
Rules for classification: Tiebreakers for teams tied on points: 1) Number of matches won 2) The difference between points for and points against 3) The number of tries scored 4) The most points scored 5) The difference between tries for and tries against 6) The fewest red cards received 7) The fewest yellow cards received.

=== Round 1 ===
21 September 2024	Ulster (Ireland)	20–19	(Scotland) Glasgow Warriors (1 BP)	Ravenhill Stadium, Belfast
7.45pm	Try: Morgan 18'; McCann 72'; Shanahan 84'; Con: Doak 19'; Pen: Doak 16'	Report	Try: Matthews 5'; Venter 25'; Steyn 74'; Con: Jordan 26'; Hastings 75'	Attendance: 11,533; Referee: Adam Jones (Wales)

=== Round 2 ===
27 September 2024	(1 BP) Glasgow Warriors (Scotland)	42–10	(Italy) Benetton	Scotstoun Stadium, Glasgow
7.35pm	Try: Steyn 5' c, 63' c M. Fagerson 16' c Darge 46' c Dobie 50'; Ferrie 80'+1 c Con: Hastings (2/2) 6', 17'; Weir (4/4) 47', 51', 64' 80'+3		Try: Spagnolo 32'; Con: Umaga (1/1) 34'; Pen: Umaga (1) 43'	Attendance: 6,441; Referee: Marius van der Westhuizen (South Africa)

=== Round 3 ===
4 October 2024	(1 BP) Cardiff (Wales)	36–52	(Scotland) Glasgow Warriors (1 BP)	Cardiff Arms Park, Cardiff
7.35pm	Try: D. Thomas 11' c Winnett 19' m Byrne 46' c Martin 52' c Donnell 67' c Con: Sheedy (1/2) 12' de Beer (3/3) 47', 54' 69'; Pen: de Beer (1/1) 59'		Try: Dobie 5' c Rowe (2) 21' m, 74' m Jordan (2) 29' c, 74' m Tuipulotu 34' c Jones 37' c M. Fagerson 74' m Con: Jordan (5/6) 6', 30', 35', 39', 64'; Weir (1/2) 72'	Attendance: 6,237; Referee: Morné Ferreira (South Africa)

=== Round 4 ===
11 October 2024	(1 BP) Glasgow Warriors (Scotland)	33–3	(Italy) Zebre Parma	Scotstoun Stadium, Glasgow
7.35pm	Try: Matthews 13' c Dobie 17' c Jones (2) 33' c, 52' c Stewart 60' m Con: Hastings (4/5) 14', 18', 34', 52'		Pen: Da Re (1/1) 27'	Attendance: 6,499; Referee: Griffin Colby (South Africa)

=== Round 5 ===
19 October 2024	Sharks (South Africa)	28–24	(Scotland) Glasgow Warriors (2 BP)	Kings Park Stadium, Durban
2.45pm	Try: Kolisi 26' c Fassi 33' m Williams 70'; Con: Jo. Hendrikse (2/3) 27', 71'; Pen: Jo. Hendrikse (3/4) 11', 45', 66'		Try: Horne (2) 17' c, 36'; Darge 79' m Matthews 80'+1 c Con: Horne (1/2) 18'; Hastings (1/2) 80'+2	Referee: Chris Busby, Ireland

=== Round 6 ===
26 October 2024	Stormers (South Africa)	17–28	(Scotland) Glasgow Warriors (1 BP)	Danie Craven Stadium, Stellenbosch
12.45pm	Try: Willemse 33' c du Plessis 54' c Con: Libbok (2/2) 34', 55'; Pen: Libbok 63'		Try: Matthews 37' c Tuipulotu 47' c Rowe 63' c Venter 70' c Con: Hastings (2/2) 38', 48'; Jordan (2/2) 65', 72'	Referee: Andrew Brace, Ireland

=== Round 7 ===
29 November 2024	Glasgow Warriors (Scotland)	17–15	(Wales) Scarlets (1 BP)	Scotstoun Stadium, Glasgow
19:35	Try: Matthews 35' c Venter 49' c Con: Weir (2/2) 36', 51'; Pen: Weir 65'		Try: Macleod 10' m Nicholas 46' c Con: Lloyd (1/2) 47'; Pen: Lloyd 7'	Attendance: 6,403; Referee: Fillipo Russo (Italy)

=== Round 8 ===
22 December 2024	'(1 BP)' Glasgow Warriors (Scotland)	33–14	(Scotland) Edinburgh	Hampden Park, Glasgow
15:00	Try: Matthews (2) 05' c, 26' c Jones 12' c Steyn 41' m Dobie 63' c Con: Horne (4/5) 07', 13', 27', 65'		Try: Venter (2) 74', 78'; Con: Healy (2/2) 74', 78'	Attendance: 27,538

=== Round 9 ===
28 December 2024	Edinburgh (Scotland)	10-7	(Scotland) Glasgow Warriors (1 BP)	Murrayfield Stadium, Edinburgh
15:00	Try: Schoeman 69' c Con: Healy (1/1) 71'; Pen: Thompson 22'	Report	Try: penalty try 67'	Attendance: 40,063; Referee: Eoghan Cross (Republic of Ireland)

=== Round 10 ===
26 January 2025	Glasgow Warriors (Scotland)	22–19	(Ireland) Connacht (1 BP)	Scotstoun Stadium, Glasgow
15:30	Try: Cancelliere 21' c Afshar 31' c Cancelliere 57' m Con: Weir (2/3) 22', 32'; Pen: Weir 8'		Try: Hawkshaw (2) 18' m, 41' c O'Conor 77' c Con: Hanrahan (2/3) 42', 78'	Attendance: 6,277

=== Round 11 ===
16 February 2025	Dragons (Wales)	20-45	(Scotland) Glasgow Warriors	Rodney Parade, Newport
14:00	Try: Benjamin, 10'c Lewis-Hughes, 41'c Con: Evans, 11', 42'; Pen: Evans, 2', 26'	[ Report]	Try: Matthews, 23'c Mann, 28'; Horne, 30', 47'c Weir, 38'c McBeth, 42'c Cancelliere, 72'c Con: Weir, 24', 38', 43', 48', 73'	Attendance: 4,109

=== Round 12 ===
1 March 2025	(2 BP) Glasgow Warriors (Scotland)	31 - 32	(Wales) Ospreys (1 BP)	Scotstoun Stadium, Glasgow
19:35	Try: Mann, 20'c Schickerling, 35', 40'c Cordero, 71'; McBeth, 78'c Con: Weir (3)	Report	Try: Morse, 3'; Hardy, 13', 74'c Perry, 17'; Giles, 37'c Con: Edwards; Walsh; Pen: Walsh, 80+1'	Attendance: 6,617

=== Round 13 ===
21 March 2025	(1 BP) Glasgow Warriors (Scotland)	28–25	(Ireland) Munster (1 BP)	Scotstoun Stadium
7.35pm	Try: Horne, 27’c Steyn, 35’c Fagerson, 68’c McBeth, 75’c Con: Hastings (4)	Report	Try: Hodnett, 16’c O'Brien, 22’m, 65'c Con: Butler; Scannell; Pen: Butler, 32', 55'	Attendance: 7,321; Referee: (South Africa) Morne Ferreira

=== Round 14 ===
29 March 2025	(1 BP) Glasgow Warriors (Scotland)	42 - 0	(South Africa) Lions	Scotstoun Stadium, Glasgow
19:35	Try: McBeth, 6'; Dobie, 18', 26'; Horne, 30'; Hastings, 38'; Stewart, 44'; Con: Hasting, 7', 19', 27', 31', 39', 44'	Report:ESPN		Attendance: 6,629

=== Round 15 ===
19 April 2025	Zebre Parma (Italy)	6 - 14	(Scotland) Glasgow Warriors	Stadio Sergio Lanfranchi, Parma
20:35	Pen: da Re, 8', 31'	Report	Try: McKay, 43'; McDowall, 52'; Con: Jordan, 44', 52'	Attendance: 2,067

=== Round 16 ===
25 April 2025	(1 BP) Glasgow Warriors (Scotland)	19 – 26	(South Africa) Bulls	Scotstoun Stadium, Glasgow
19:35	Try: Dobie, 34'; Steyn. 77'; McDowall, 79'; Con: Horne, 38', 80'	Report, 2	Try: Greobbelaar, 52'; Kriel, 59'; Con: Goosen, 53', 60'; Pen: Goosen, 17', 24', 40', 55'	Attendance: 7,431; Referee: Andrew Brace

=== Round 17 ===
10 May 2025	(1 BP) Benetton (Italy)	33–7	(Scotland) Glasgow Warriors	Stadio Monigo, Treviso
18:15	Try: Odogwu, 6'; Maile, 8'; Smith, 26'; Menoncello, 52'; Umaga, 57'; Con: Umaga, 6', 9', 53', 58'	Report	Try: Jones, 64'; Con: Horne, 65'	Attendance: 5,000

=== Round 18 ===
17 May 2025	Leinster (Ireland)	13 – 5	(Scotland) Glasgow Warriors	Aviva Stadium, Dublin
19:35	Try: O'Brien, 27; Con: Prendergast, 28; Pen: Prendergast, 54; Frawley, 79'	Report	Try: Horne, 56	Attendance: 17,654

=== Play-offs ===
Quarter-finals
1	(Ireland) Leinster	33
8	(Wales) Scarlets	21
4	(Scotland) Glasgow Warriors	36
5	(South Africa) Stormers	18
3	(South Africa) Sharks	24 ^{(6)}
6	(Ireland) Munster	24 ^{(4)}
2	(South Africa) Bulls	42
7	(Scotland) Edinburgh	33

Semi-finals
1	(Ireland) Leinster	37
4	(Scotland) Glasgow Warriors	19
2	(South Africa) Bulls	25
3	(South Africa) Sharks	13

Final
1	(Ireland) Leinster	32
2	(South Africa) Bulls	7

=== Quarter-finals ===
A fourth place finish in the final table gave defending champions Glasgow Warriors a home quarter-final against Stormers, from South Africa.

30 May 2025	Glasgow Warriors (Scotland)	36–18	Stormers (South Africa)	Scotstoun Stadium, Glasgow
7:35pm	Try: Darge, 10'; Rowe, 15', 46'; Venter, 28'; Horne, 52'; Con: Horne, 11', 16', 47', 53'; Pen: Horne, 56'	Report. 2	Try: Senatla, 26', 43'; Con: Feinberg-Mngomezulu, 27'; Pen: Feinberg-Mngomezulu, 7', 19'; Cards: Senatla (yellow card) 9' to 19'	Attendance: 6,867

=== Semi-final ===
7 June 2025	Leinster (Ireland)	37–19	(Scotland) Glasgow Warriors	Aviva Stadium, Dublin
	Try: Sheehan, 3', 41'; Osborne, 28', 54'; Clarkson, 33'; Frawley, 58'; Con: Prendergast (2/6), 4', 55'; Pen: Prendergast (1/2), 23'	Report, 2	Try: Horne, 5'; Dobie, 72'; Tuipulotu, 79'; Con: Jordan (2/2), 72', 79' (Horne (0/1))	Attendance: 15,762

Glasgow Warriors are eliminated from the championship.

== URC Scottish-x-Italian Shield ==
2024–25 United Rugby Championship Regional Shield Pools
(Italy) (Scotland) Italian x Scottish Shield
	Team	P	W	D	L	PF	PA	PD	TF	TA	TBP	LBP	Pts	Pos overall
1	(Scotland) Glasgow Warriors (S)	6	4	0	2	136	76	+60	20	9	3	1	20	4
2	(Italy) Benetton	6	4	0	2	132	139	–7	19	19	3	0	19	10
3	(Scotland) Edinburgh	6	2	1	3	134	141	–7	18	20	1	2	13	7
4	(Italy) Zebre Parma	6	1	1	4	88	124	–46	9	18	0	1	7	15
If teams are level at any stage, tiebreakers are applied in the following order: 1. number of matches won 2. the difference between points for and points against 3. the number of tries scored 4. the most points scored 5. the difference between tries for and tries against 6. the fewest red cards received 7. the fewest yellow cards received
Green background indicates teams currently leading the regional shield. Upon the conclusion of the regular season, these teams win their respective regional shields. (S) : URC Shield champion

Glasgow Warriors retain the URC Scottish-x-Italian Shield for the third time.

== 1872 Cup ==
Glasgow Warriors won the 2024-25 1872 Cup on aggregate score 40-24, after both teams won their home leg. The total attendance across the two fixtures was 67,601 or 33,800 per leg.

=== Glasgow leg ===
22 December 2024
15:00

Glasgow Warriors (Scotland)	33–14	(Scotland) Edinburgh
Try: Matthews (2) 05' c, 26' c Jones 12' c Steyn 41' m Dobie 63' c Con: Horne (4/5) 07', 13', 27', 65'		Try: Venter (2) 74', 78'; Con: Healy (2/2) 74', 78'

Hampden Park, Glasgow
Attendance: 27,538

=== Edinburgh leg ===
28 December 2024
15:00

Edinburgh (Scotland)	10–7	(Scotland) Glasgow Warriors
Try: Schoeman 69' c Con: Healy (1/1) 71'; Pen: Thompson 22'	Report	Try: penalty try 67'

Murrayfield Stadium, Edinburgh
Attendance: 40,063
Referee: Eoghan Cross (Ireland)

Glasgow Warriors retain the 1872 Cup on aggregate 40-24.

== European Champions Cup ==
European Rugby Champions Cup Pool 4
Pos	Team	Pld	W	D	L	PF	PA	PD	TF	TA	TB	LB	Pts	Qualification
1	(France) Toulon (4)	4	3	0	1	94	94	0	12	14	1	0	13	Home Champions Cup round of 16
2	(Scotland) Glasgow Warriors (7)	4	2	0	2	103	92	+11	16	12	3	1	12	Home Champions Cup round of 16
3	(England) Sale Sharks (12)	4	2	0	2	81	92	−11	12	14	2	0	10	Away Champions Cup round of 16
4	(England) Harlequins (15)	4	2	0	2	110	79	+31	16	10	1	0	9	Away Champions Cup round of 16
5	(France) Racing 92 (9CC)	4	2	0	2	80	92	−12	12	14	1	0	9	Away Challenge Cup round of 16
6	(South Africa) Stormers	4	1	0	3	92	108	−16	12	16	1	0	5	

Source: EPCR
Rules for classification: Tiebreakers for teams tied on points: 1) Number of matches won; 2) Difference between points for and against; 3) Total number of points for; 4) Aggregate number of points scored in matches between tied teams; 5) Number of matches won excluding the first match, then the second and so on until the tie is settled.

=== Results ===
==== Round 1 ====
7 December 2024	(1 BP) Glasgow Warriors (Scotland)	38–19	(England) Sale Sharks	Scotstoun Stadium, Glasgow
20:00	Try: Horne (3) 2' c, 12' m, 39' c Rowe 16' c Jones 23' c Cummings 64' m Con: Horne (3/5) 4', 17', 40'; Jordan (1/1) 25'	Report	Try: Penalty try 21'; Reed 26' m Carpenter 61' c Con: R. du Preez (1/2) 62'	Attendance: 6,889; Referee: Andrea Piardi (Italy)

==== Round 2 ====
15 December 2024	Toulon (France)	30–29	(Scotland) Glasgow Warriors (2 BP)	Stade Mayol, Toulon
15:15 (Note: The kick-off between Toulon and Glasgow was rescheduled from its original time of 13:00 to a new time of 15:15, to avoid a television broadcasting overlap caused by the rescheduling of the fixture between Stade Français and Saracens.)	Try: Fainga'anuku (2) 5' c, 43' c Alainu'uese 49' c Con: Serin (3/3) 6', 44', 50'; Pen: Domon (2/2) 29', 33'; Serin (1/1) 74'	Report	Try: Penalty try 25'; McKay 35' m Oguntibeju 54' c Matthews 79' c Con: Weir (1/2) 55'; Horne (1/1) 80'; Pen: Weir (1/1) 47'	Attendance: 14,410; Referee: Matthew Carley (England)

==== Round 3 ====
10 January 2025	(1 BP) Glasgow Warriors (Scotland)	29–19	(France) Racing 92	Scotstoun Stadium, Glasgow
20:00	Try: Horne 2' c Dobie 17' m Cancelliere 22' m Tuipulotu 39' m Darge 58' c Con: Horne 2'; Jordan 59'	Report	Try: Habosi 33' c Mazibuko 71' c Tedder 75'm Con: Tedder (2) 33', 72'	Attendance: 7,216; Referee: Karl Dickson (England)

==== Round 4 ====
18 January 2025	Harlequins (England)	24–7	(Scotland) Glasgow Warriors	Twickenham Stoop, London
20:00	Try: Cunningham-South 13' c Chisholm 19' c Murley 67' c Con: Smith (3/3) 14', 20', 68'; Pen: Smith (1/1) 25'	Report	Try: Jordan 28' c Con: Jordan (1/1) 29'	Attendance: 11,802; Referee: Pierre Brousset (France)

Knockout stages

Round of 16
1	(France) Bordeaux Bègles	43
16	(Ireland) Ulster	31
8	(France) La Rochelle	24
9	(Ireland) Munster	25
4	(France) Toulon	72
13	(England) Saracens	42
5	(France) Toulouse	38
12	(England) Sale Sharks	15
2	(Ireland) Leinster	62
15	(England) Harlequins	0
7	(Scotland) Glasgow Warriors	43
10	(England) Leicester Tigers	19
3	(England) Northampton Saints	46
14	(France) Clermont	24
6	(France) Castres	39
11	(Italy) Benetton	37

Quarter-finals
1	(France) Bordeaux Bègles	47
9	(Ireland) Munster	29
4	(France) Toulon	18
5	(France) Toulouse	21
2	(Ireland) Leinster	52
7	(Scotland) Glasgow Warriors	0
3	(England) Northampton Saints	51
6	(France) Castres	16

Semi-finals
1	(France) Bordeaux Bègles	35
5	(France) Toulouse	18
2	(Ireland) Leinster	34
3	(England) Northampton Saints	37

Final
1	(France) Bordeaux Bègles	28
3	(England) Northampton Saints	20

==== Round of 16 ====
Glasgow finished as seventh overall seed, gaining homefield advantage for the round of 16. In that round, they drew tenth seed Leicester Tigers, winning 43-19 to gain a quarter final matchup in Dublin with Leinster.

5 April 2025	Glasgow Warriors (Scotland) (7)	43–19	(10) (England) Leicester Tigers	Scotstoun Stadium, Glasgow
20:00	Try: Venter (2) 13' c, 74' m Vailanu (2) 18' c, 41' c Hastings 49' c Horne 50' c Con: Hastings (5/6) 14', 19', 42', 50', 51'; Pen: Hastings (1/1) 42'	Report	Try: Cracknell 2' m Kata 56' c Liebenberg 66' c Con: Pollard (2/3) 59', 67'	Attendance: 7,321; Referee: Craig Evans (Wales)

==== Quarter final ====
11 April 2025	Leinster (Ireland) (2)	52–0; H.T.: 33–0	(7) (Scotland) Glasgow Warriors	Aviva Stadium, Dublin
20:00	Try: Deegan, 13’c, 75' penalty try, 22; Lowe. 24’ O'Brien, 29’c Keenan, 33’c Ringrose, 46’c Sheehan, 57’c Con: Prendergast, 14' 30' 34', 47', 58'	Report: EPRC		Attendance: 22,400; Referee: Luke Pearce (England)

Glasgow Warriors are eliminated from the competition.

== Home attendance ==
Glasgow Warriors's normal home stadium, Scotstoun Stadium has a capacity of just over 8'000. However, the Warriors moved their home leg of the 1872 Cup fixture with Edinburgh Rugby to Hampden Park.

Domestic League						European Cup						Total	
League	Fixtures	Total Attendance	Average Attendance	Highest	Lowest	League	Fixtures	Total Attendance	Average Attendance	Highest	Lowest	Total Attendance	Average Attendance
2024–25 United Rugby Championship	10	88,023	8,802	27,538	6,277	2024–25 European Rugby Champions Cup	3	21,426	7,142	7,321	6,889	109,449	8,419

== Warrior of the month awards ==
Award	Winner
September	(Scotland) Kyle Steyn
October	(Scotland) Sione Tuipulotu
November	not awarded
December	(Scotland) George Horne
January	(Scotland) Jack Mann
February	not awarded
March	(Scotland) Nathan McBeth
April	(Scotland) Jamie Dobie
May	(Scotland) Rory Darge

== End of Season awards ==
=== Men ===
Award	Winner
Breakthrough Player of the Season	(Scotland) Jare Oguntibeju
Coaches Award	(South Africa) JP du Preez & (Tonga) Sione Vailanu
Test Player of the Season	(Scotland) Huw Jones
Most Improved Player of the Season	(Scotland) Jack Mann
Al Kellock Leadership Award	(New Zealand) Josh McKay
Community Hero of the Year	Heather Bonnar (Kirkcaldy RFC)
Try of the Season	(Scotland) George Horne vs. (England) Sale Sharks
Players' Player of the Season	(Scotland) Sione Tuipulotu
Player of the Season	(Scotland) George Horne

=== Women ===
Award	Winner
Coaches Player of the Season	(Scotland) Ceitidh Ainsworth
Players' Player of the Season	(Scotland) Freya Walker

== Competitive debuts this season ==
A player's nationality shown is taken from the nationality at the highest honour for the national side obtained; or if never capped internationally their place of birth. Senior caps take precedence over junior caps or place of birth; junior caps take precedence over place of birth. A player's nationality at debut may be different from the nationality shown. Combination sides like the British and Irish Lions or Pacific Islanders are not national sides, or nationalities.

Players in BOLD font have been capped by their senior international XV side as nationality shown.

Players in Italic font have capped either by their international 7s side; or by the international XV 'A' side as nationality shown.

Players in normal font have not been capped at senior level.

A position in parentheses indicates that the player debuted as a substitute. A player may have made a prior debut for Glasgow Warriors in a non-competitive match, 'A' match or 7s match; these matches are not listed.

Tournaments where competitive debut made:

**Scottish Inter-District Championship**	**Welsh–Scottish League**	**WRU Challenge Cup**	**Celtic League**	**Celtic Cup**	**1872 Cup**	**Pro12**	**Pro14**	**Rainbow Cup**	**United Rugby Championship**	**European Challenge Cup**	**Heineken Cup / European Champions Cup**

Crosshatching indicates a jointly hosted match.

Number	Player nationality	Name	Position	Date of debut	Venue	Stadium	Opposition nationality	Opposition side	Tournament	Match result	Scoring debut
361	(Australia)	**Sam Talakai**	Prop	2024-09-21	Away	Kingspan Stadium	(Ireland)	Ulster Rugby	United Rugby Championship	Loss	Nil
362	(Scotland)	**Rory Sutherland**	Prop	2024-09-27	Home	Scotstoun Stadium	(Italy)	Benetton Rugby	United Rugby Championship	Win	Nil
363	(Namibia)	Patrick Schickerling	(Prop)	2024-10-04	Away	Cardiff Arms Park	(Wales)	Cardiff Rugby	United Rugby Championship	Win	Nil
364	(Scotland)	Fin Richardson	Prop	2024-11-29	Home	Scotstoun Stadium	(Wales)	Scarlets	United Rugby Championship	Win	Nil
365	(Scotland)	Jare Oguntibeju	Lock	2024-11-29	Home	Scotstoun Stadium	(Wales)	Scarlets	United Rugby Championship	Win	Nil
366	(Scotland)	Kerr Johnston	(Wing)	2025-02-16	Away	Rodney Parade	(Wales)	Dragons	United Rugby Championship	Win	Nil
367	(Scotland)	Macenzzie Duncan	(No. 8)	2025-02-16	Away	Rodney Parade	(Wales)	Dragons	United Rugby Championship	Win	Nil
368	(Scotland)	Seb Stephen	Hooker	2025-05-17	Away	Aviva Stadium	(Ireland)	Leinster	United Rugby Championship	Loss	Nil

== Sponsorship ==
- SP Energy Networks – Title Sponsor and Community Sponsor
- Scottish Power – Official Kit

=== Official kit supplier ===
- Macron

=== Official kit sponsors ===
- Malcolm Group
- McCrea Financial Services
- Denholm Oilfield
- Ross Hall Hospital
- Story Contracting
- Leidos

=== Official sponsors ===
- The Famous Grouse
- Clyde Travel Management
- Harper Macleod
- Caledonia Best
- Eden Mill Brewery and Distillery
- David Lloyd Leisure
- Crabbie's
- Cala Homes
- Capital Solutions
- Martha's Restaurant
- Sterling Furniture

=== Official partners ===
- A.G. Barr
- Benchmarx
- Black & Lizars
- Cameron House
- Glasgow Airport
- Healthspan Elite
- KubeNet
- Mentholatum
- MSC Nutrition
- Smile Plus
- Lenco Utilities
- Scot JCB News Scotland
- HF Group
- Primestaff
- Village Hotel Club
- The Crafty Pig
- Kooltech
- Savills
- iPro Sports
- RHA
