= 2024–25 Scottish Rugby Academy season =

Scottish Rugby Academy 2024 / 2025

The Scottish Rugby Academy provides Scotland's up-and-coming rugby union players a dedicated, focused routeway for development into the professional game. Entry is restricted to Scottish qualified students and both male and female entrants are accepted into four regional academies. The 2024–25 season sees the tenth year of the academy, and sponsored by Fosroc.

== Season overview ==
This was the tenth year of the Scottish Rugby Academy. With the closure of the Super 6 league, the academy numbers for both Glasgow Warriors and Edinburgh Rugby have been increased to help mitigate the young players development.

== Regional Academies ==
The Scottish Rugby Academy runs four regional academies in Scotland:- Glasgow and the West, Borders and East Lothian, Edinburgh and Caledonia. These roughly correspond to the traditional districts of Glasgow District, South, Edinburgh District and North and Midlands.

== Stages ==
Players are selected in three stages:-

=== Supported stages ===
- Stage 1 – Regionally selected and regionally supported players
- Stage 2 – Nationally selected and regionally supported players

=== Contracted stage ===
- Stage 3 – Nationally selected and regionally supported players assigned to a professional team.

== Academy Players ==
=== Stage 3 players ===
Stage 3 players are assigned to a professional team. Nominally, for the men, Glasgow Warriors receive the Stage 3 players of Glasgow and the West and Caledonia regions, while Edinburgh Rugby receive the Stage 3 players of the Edinburgh and Borders and East Lothian regions. The women are integrated into the Scotland women's national rugby sevens team and the Scotland women's national rugby union team.

The Stage 3 players were assigned directly to Glasgow Warriors and Edinburgh Rugby.

==== Glasgow Warriors ====
Note: Flags indicate national union under World Rugby eligibility rules. Players may hold more than one non-World Rugby nationality.

Player	Position	Union
Tom Banatvala	Prop	Scotland
Callum Norrie	Prop	Scotland
Callum Smyth	Prop	Scotland
Jake Shearer	Prop	Scotland
Oliver McKenna	Hooker	Scotland
Joe Roberts	Hooker	Scotland
Ryan Burke	Lock	Scotland
Dan Halkon	Lock	Scotland
Jare Oguntibeju	Lock	Scotland
Macenzzie Duncan	Flanker	Scotland
Archie McMichael	Flanker	Scotland
Jonny Morris	Flanker	Scotland
Rory Purvis	Flanker	Scotland

Player	Position	Union
Brent Jackson	Scrum-half	Scotland
Richie Simpson	Fly-half	Scotland
Matthew Urwin	Fly-half	Scotland
Alex Brydon	Centre	Scotland
Duncan Munn	Centre	Scotland
Ben Salmon	Centre	Scotland
Johnny Ventisei	Centre	Scotland
Kerr Yule	Centre	Scotland
Amena Caqusau	Wing	Scotland
Aidan Cross	Wing	Scotland
Kerr Johnston	Wing	Scotland
Harry Provan	Wing	Scotland
Fergus Watson	Fullback	Scotland

==== Edinburgh ====
Note: Flags indicate national union under World Rugby eligibility rules. Players may hold more than one non-World Rugby nationality.

Player	Position	Union
Mikey Jones	Prop	Scotland
Ollie Blyth-Lafferty	Prop	Scotland
Jamie Stuart	Prop	Scotland
Jerry Blyth-Lafferty	Hooker	Scotland
Harri Morris	Hooker	Scotland
Christian Lindsay	Lock	Scotland
Euan McVie	Lock	Scotland
Mak Rutherford	Lock	Scotland
Tom Currie	Flanker	Scotland
Freddy Douglas	Flanker	Scotland
Liam McConnell	Flanker	Scotland
Ollie Duncan	Number 8	Scotland

Player	Position	Union
Connor McAlpine	Scrum-half	Scotland
Hamish McArthur	Scrum-half	Scotland
Hector Patterson	Scrum-half	Scotland
Isaac Coates	Fly-half	Scotland
Ross Wolfenden	Fly-half	Scotland
Jack Hocking	Centre	Scotland
Sam Leweni	Centre	Scotland
Findlay Thomson	Centre	Scotland
Nairn Moncrieff	Wing	Scotland
Lewis Wells	Wing	Scotland

== Graduates of this year ==
Players who have signed professional contracts with clubs:

- (Scotland) Jare Oguntibeju (Glasgow Warriors)
- (Scotland) Duncan Munn (Glasgow Warriors)
- (Scotland) Freddy Douglas (Edinburgh)
- (Scotland) Amena Caqusau (Northampton Saints)
- (Scotland) Aidan Cross (Doncaster Knights)
- (Scotland) Callum Smyth (Worcester Warriors)
- (Scotland) Richie Simpson (Ealing Trailfinders)
