= Glenys Arthur =

New Zealand neurologist (1936–2022)

Glenys Arthur CNZM
- Born: Glenys Patricia Smart; 1 May 1936; Dunedin, New Zealand
- Died: 20 May 2022 (aged 86); Wellington, New Zealand
- Education: University of Otago
- Occupation: Neurologist
- Known for: Campaigning for the rights of women doctors
- Spouse: Athol Bruce Arthur (m. 1959)
- Children: 2

Glenys Patricia Arthur CNZM (née Smart; 1 May 1936 – 20 May 2022) was a New Zealand neurologist. She campaigned for the rights of women medical practitioners, and was the first woman to serve on the executive of the New Zealand Medical Association, between 1983 and 1989. She was a co-founder of the Wellington branch of the New Zealand Medical Women's Association, and twice served as the association's national president. In 1989, she was elected to the Wellington Area Health Board.

== Early life and family ==
Born Glenys Patrica Smart in Dunedin on 1 May 1936, Arthur was the daughter of Florence Agnes Smart (née Garland) and David Douglas Smart. She was educated at Hokitika District High School, before beginning medical studies at the University of Otago in 1954, against the wishes of her father, who felt that she should study teaching or home science, or become an apprentice pharmacist. She met her future husband, Athol Bruce Arthur, also a medical student, on her first day at medical school, and they eventually married in 1959. The couple went on to have two children. Glenys Arthur graduated with MB ChB degrees from Otago in 1960.

== Career ==
Arthur worked as a house surgeon and then part-time registrar at Waikato Hospital between 1961 and 1963. Her husband obtained a fellowship to undertake specialist training in paediatrics in London, but Arthur, having recently given birth to their first child, was initially unable to travel there with him. A year later, she obtained passage as a ship's surgeon on a cargo ship.

In London, she found work as a part-time general practitioner in 1963, and then worked at hospitals in Middlesex as an admissions officer and senior house officer from 1964 to 1965. Between 1965 and 1967, she was a geriatric medicine registrar, which she chose as it allowed her more time with her family. The Arthurs had a second child, and they returned to New Zealand in 1967.

Arthur spent a brief period as a locum general practitioner in Tītahi Bay and then as a cardiologist at Hutt Hospital. She began working at Wellington Hospital in April 1968, where she specialised in neurology, remaining there until her retirement as a consultant physician in 2001. Arthur was a part-time lecturer at the Wellington Hospital School of Nursing from 1969 to 1976, and at the Central Institute of Technology's School of Pharmacy from 1975 to 1989. She became a Fellow of the Royal Australasian College of Physicians in 1978, and a Fellow of the Australasian Faculty of Rehabilitation Medicine in 1983.

From the 1970s, Arthur was active in medical politics, and she became the first woman to serve as president of the Wellington branch of the New Zealand Medical Association (NZMA). In 1983, she was the first woman elected to the national executive of the NZMA, serving until 1989, and she was the association's first female fellow.

In 1971, Arthur was a co-founder of the Wellington division of the New Zealand Medical Women's Association, and she went on to serve two terms as the organisation's national president. Between 1981 and 1984, she was president of the New Zealand Rehabilitation Association. Arthur advocated for the rights of women physicians and patients, leading to the introduction of job sharing, the right to train as a specialist part-time, enhanced maternity provisions, and the right for women patients to choose to be treated by a woman specialist.

Arthur was elected as the highest-polling candidate to be a member of the Wellington Area Health Board in 1989, serving until elected members of area health boards were replaced by appointed commissioners by the National Government in 1991.

== Later life and death ==
Arthur retired from Wellington Hospital in 2001, aged 65, but continued in private practice. In the 2002 New Year Honours, she was appointed a Companion of the New Zealand Order of Merit, for services to medicine. She died in Wellington on 20 May 2022, and was survived by her husband and one of their two children.
