= Roy Geddes =

Dean of Science and Engineering at Auckland Institute of Technology (1940–2006)

Roy Geddes CNZM (4 August 1940 – 25 August 2006), born Robert Geddes, was a Scottish-born New Zealand chemist and biochemist, and worked as Dean of Science and Engineering at Auckland Institute of Technology.

== Early life and family ==
Born in Edinburgh, Scotland, on 4 August 1940, Geddes was educated at Holy Cross Academy. In 1965, he married Estelle Philomena O'Keeffe, and the couple went on to have four children. They emigrated to New Zealand in 1970, and Geddes was naturalised as a New Zealander in 1977.

== University career ==
Geddes began his career in the Department of Biochemistry of the University of Auckland as a senior lecturer in 1970, after obtaining BSc(Hons) and PhD degrees in chemistry from the University of Edinburgh, and postdoctoral fellowships in physical biochemistry at the Australian National University (1967–69), and at Georgetown University, Washington D.C. (1965–66).

In Auckland he investigated the structure and metabolism of glycogen, an energy storage polysaccharide, by physical biochemistry methods. His work provided evidence for the existence of a protein core, now known as glycogenin, within glycogen.

He was deputy Dean of Science from 1982 to 1985 at the University of Auckland and subsequently Dean from 1986 to 1993. In 1994, he moved to Auckland Institute of Technology as its Dean of Science and Engineering. During his term as Dean, his faculty acquired a modern and attractive building, and the Institute became Auckland University of Technology, a transformation to which Geddes contributed significantly.

Geddes served on UNESCO committees as a New Zealand representative and provided consultancy to Ministry of Research, Science and Technology of New Zealand.

== Friction stir welding ==
Geddes described himself as the catalyst, who had kicked off the industrialisation of friction stir welding in New Zealand, after obtaining consultancy about the process at TWI (The Welding Institute) during a trip to the United Kingdom. While working at Auckland University of Technology (AUT) he teamed up with New Zealand Trade and Enterprise (NZTE), Marine Industry Association (MIA), ION Automotive NZ, Circa Marine & Industrial and Ullrich Aluminium, to disseminate and utilise the know-how. At this time in 2004 it was announced that a number of 55 metre Protector-class inshore patrol vessels would be procured for use by the Royal Australian Navy and Royal NZ Navy - and now the opportunity existed for both Australia and New Zealand to be involved in building them. The naval architect of these vessels specified that a significant portion of the structure had to be friction stir welded.

The collaborators made a concerted effort on bringing New Zealand up to speed in this field by co-operative technology transfer. In mid-2005, the Donovan Group in Whangārei implemented friction stir welding for the manufacture of these vessels. The Donovan Group has since then modified a large CNC gantry milling machine to be used as a friction stir welding machine for large scale production, which is required for the patrol vessel building.

AUT developed the application of friction stir welding in the production of alloy wheel rims and structures using thick aluminium alloy plates. All of the FSW carried out by AUT has been achieved on existing manufacturing equipment that the university has modified, as opposed to custom-built friction stir welding machinery. Contractually, the industrial uptake of friction stir welding was comparatively easy in New Zealand, since the Australian/New Zealand Standard on 'Welding of aluminium structures' had been issued.

This was one of the first standards that covers friction stir welding, although it actually focuses on arc welding. It includes an innovation clause within its first section, which states that 'The Standard can be applied to other welding processes such as friction welding, including friction stir, […] provided all requirements of the Standard are met, as well as specific constraints of needs, demands and operation of the individual welding processes.'

== Honours ==
Ribbon of the New Zealand 1990 Commemoration Medal

Geddes was awarded the New Zealand 1990 Commemoration Medal, and in 1999 he was elected as one of the three inaugural Companions of the Royal Society of New Zealand. In the 2002 New Year Honours, Geddes was appointed a Companion of the New Zealand Order of Merit, for services to science and technology education.

== Death ==
Geddes died in North Shore City on 25 August 2006, aged 66. His ashes were buried at North Shore Memorial Park.
