= Margaret Millard =

New Zealand community activist (born 1939)

Dame Margaret Millard DNZM JP
- Born: Margaret Mary Doherty; 1939 (age 86–87); Woodville, New Zealand
- Spouse: Eddie Millard (m. 1969)

Dame Margaret Mary Millard DNZM JP (née Doherty; born 1939) is a New Zealand rural community leader. She was the first woman to serve as a provincial president of Federated Farmers, was chair of Rural Women New Zealand (formerly the Women's Division of Federated Farmers) between 1999 and 2001, and instigated the establishment of the Rural Family Support Trust. She was a Manawatu-Wanganui regional councillor from 1989 to 1992, and has also served on the Massey University Council.

== Biography ==
Millard was born in 1939 in Woodville and was raised there. After living and working in Wellington for 10 years, she married Eddie Millard, a farmer from Bainesse, near Palmerston North, in 1969.

After her marriage, Millard became actively involved in rural life. She joined the Women's Division of Federated Farmers, now known as Rural Women New Zealand, and served at national level for 20 years as a councillor, treasurer, home health chair, and finally as president from 1999 until 2001. In 1987, she was elected the Manawatu/Rangitikei provincial president of Federated Farmers, becoming the first woman to hold such a position in New Zealand, and served a two-year term. Also in 1987, concerned about difficulties experienced by farmers and their families during an economic recession, she launched the Rural Family Support Trust.

Millard was elected as a Manawatu-Wanganui regional councillor in 1989, serving one three-year term. She has served as a member of the Massey University Council, and was appointed as chair of the Open Polytechnic of New Zealand in 1995. She is also a justice of the peace.

Millard represented New Zealand at the 1993 UNESCO symposium on women in development and the 1995 United Nationals conference on women. In 2001, she was the leader of the New Zealand delegation to the Associated Country Women of the World conference held in Canada.

== Honours and awards ==
In 1993, Millard was awarded the New Zealand Suffrage Centennial Medal. In the 2002 New Year Honours, she was appointed a Distinguished Companion of the New Zealand Order of Merit, for services to the rural community, and in 2009, following the restoration of titular honours by the New Zealand government, she accepted redesignation as a Dame Companion of the New Zealand Order of Merit.
