= Loo-Chi Hu =

Chinese emigrant to New Zealand (1924– 2013)

- Born: 28 December 1924; China
- Died: 8 September 2013 (aged 88); Christchurch, New Zealand
- Known for: Sailing a junk from Taiwan to America

Loo-Chi Hu QSM (28 December 1924 – 8 September 2013) was a Chinese-born New Zealand marine equipment designer, fisheries consultant and tai chi teacher. As well as being awarded the Queen's Service Medal, Huloo, as he was known, is notable for having sailed a 65 year old junk from Taiwan to America, despite never having crewed a sail ship before, as well as rescuing adventurous Norwegian sailor Thor Heyerdahl.

== Biography ==
Huloo was born in China in 1924. As a teenager Huloo learnt tai chi in Shanghai from Chen Weiming.

In 1949 Mao Zedong came to power while Huloo was working as a fisherman in Taiwan. At his father's advice he stayed in Taiwan. In 1955 he and five others sailed a junk renamed Free China from Taiwan to San Francisco, escaping the oppressive government in control at the time while also persuading that government to sponsor the trip as the Taiwanese entry in a boat race that was to run between USA's east coast and Sweden. None of the men had ever worked on a sail ship before. One of the five men was the USA Vice-consul to Taiwan who was placed on board to document the trip and a documentary movie was released. The journey was initially abandoned due to poor weather. When resumed it took 112 days including a delay in Japan for repairs after having hit Typhoon Annie so they were unable to enter the proposed race. While acclaimed as a sensation upon arrival Free China eventually fell into disrepair over the next several decades. It was privately repaired in the late 80s and as at 2007, after having been lost for several years, there was talk of it returning it to Taiwan. In 2006 the surviving crew were invited to belatedly celebrate the 50th anniversary of the sailing. The effort to save the junk from being scrapped were documented in The Free China Junk (2010) including its eventual return to Taiwan and a reunion of the crew.

Huloo settled with his family in Christchurch, New Zealand in 1967. He worked in the marine industry where amongst other things he developed navigational aids. In 1970 he was asked by the UN to assist in searching and rescuing Thor Heyerdahl and the crew of Ra II who were attempting to sail from Morocco to Barbados in a papyrus boat. The search was successful and Heyerdahl was guided to port for four days.

In Christchurch, Huloo offered tai chi instruction for free, saying that inability to pay was not a reason to deprive someone of the benefits of tai chi. Huloo led daily 6 am classes, variously over the years at Phillipstown School or Hagley Park or in a shed next to his house. Some of Huloo's students went on to found the New Zealand National Tai Chi Association in 1988. For his charitable efforts at promoting tai chi Huloo was awarded the Queen's Service Medal for community service in the 2002 New Year Honours. In 2003 he released an instructional DVD of his 84-form Yang-style tai chi.

In 2008 a documentary of Huloo was made called simply Huloo.

== Personal life ==
Hu died in Christchurch in 2013.
