= 2002 New Year Honours (New Zealand) =

Annual awards for New Zealanders

- Previous: 2001 Queen's Birthday Honours; Next: 2002 Royal Visit Honours
- Type: New Zealand royal honours: Order of New Zealand; New Zealand Order of Merit; Queen's Service Order; Queen's Service Medal
- Date: 31 December 2001
- Country: New Zealand
- Total recipients: 197

The 2002 New Year Honours in New Zealand were appointments by Elizabeth II in her right as Queen of New Zealand, on the advice of the New Zealand government, to various orders and honours to reward and highlight good works by New Zealanders, and to celebrate the passing of 2001 and the beginning of 2002. They were announced on 31 December 2001.

The recipients of honours are listed here as they were styled before their new honour.

== Order of New Zealand (ONZ) ==
Ordinary member

- Professor Alan Graham MacDiarmid – of Pennsylvania, United States of America.
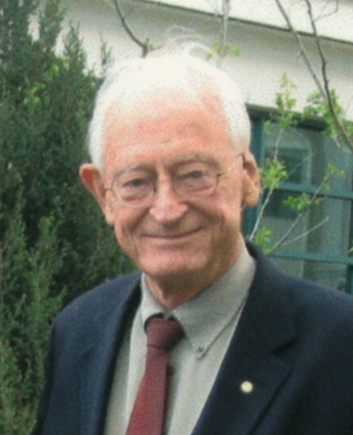
Alan MacDiarmid

== New Zealand Order of Merit ==
=== Distinguished Companion (DCNZM) ===
- Lynley Stuart Dodd – of Tauranga. For services to children's literature and book illustration.
- Margaret Mary Millard JP – of Palmerston North. For services to the rural community.
- Dr Peter George Snell OBE – of Dallas, Texas, United States of America. For services to sport.
- The Right Honourable Edmund Walter Thomas QC – of Auckland. For services as a judge of the Court of Appeal.
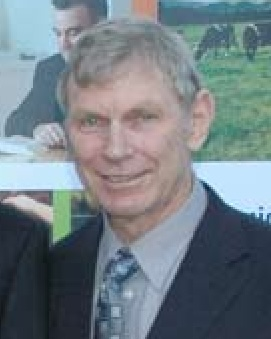
Peter Snell

=== Companion (CNZM) ===
- Dr Glenys Patricia Arthur – of Wellington. For services to medicine.
- Dr Susan Nicola Bagshaw – of Christchurch. For services to youth health.
- Emeritus Professor Douglas Saxon Coombs – of Dunedin. For services to mineralogy.
- Professor Robert (Roy) Geddes – of Auckland. For services to science and technology education.
- The Right Reverend Bruce Carlyle Gilberd – of Tairua. For services to the community.
- Richard Michael Hill – of Arrowtown. For services to business and the arts.
- Professor Andrew Reed Hornblow – of Christchurch. For services to medicine and health services.
- Peter Robert Jackson – of Wellington. For services to film.
- The Most Reverend Max Takuira Matthew Mariu – of Tokoroa. For services to Māori and the community.
- The Honourable Daniel Paul Neazor – of Wellington. For services as a judge of the High Court.
- Dr Margaret Orbell – of Auckland. For services to Māori and literature.
- Professor Bruce Jerome Ross – of Wellington. For services to agriculture.
- Jacqueline Te Kani – of Wellington. For services to Māori.
- Marcia Ellen Wilson (Sister Marcellin) – of Wellington. For services to education and the community.
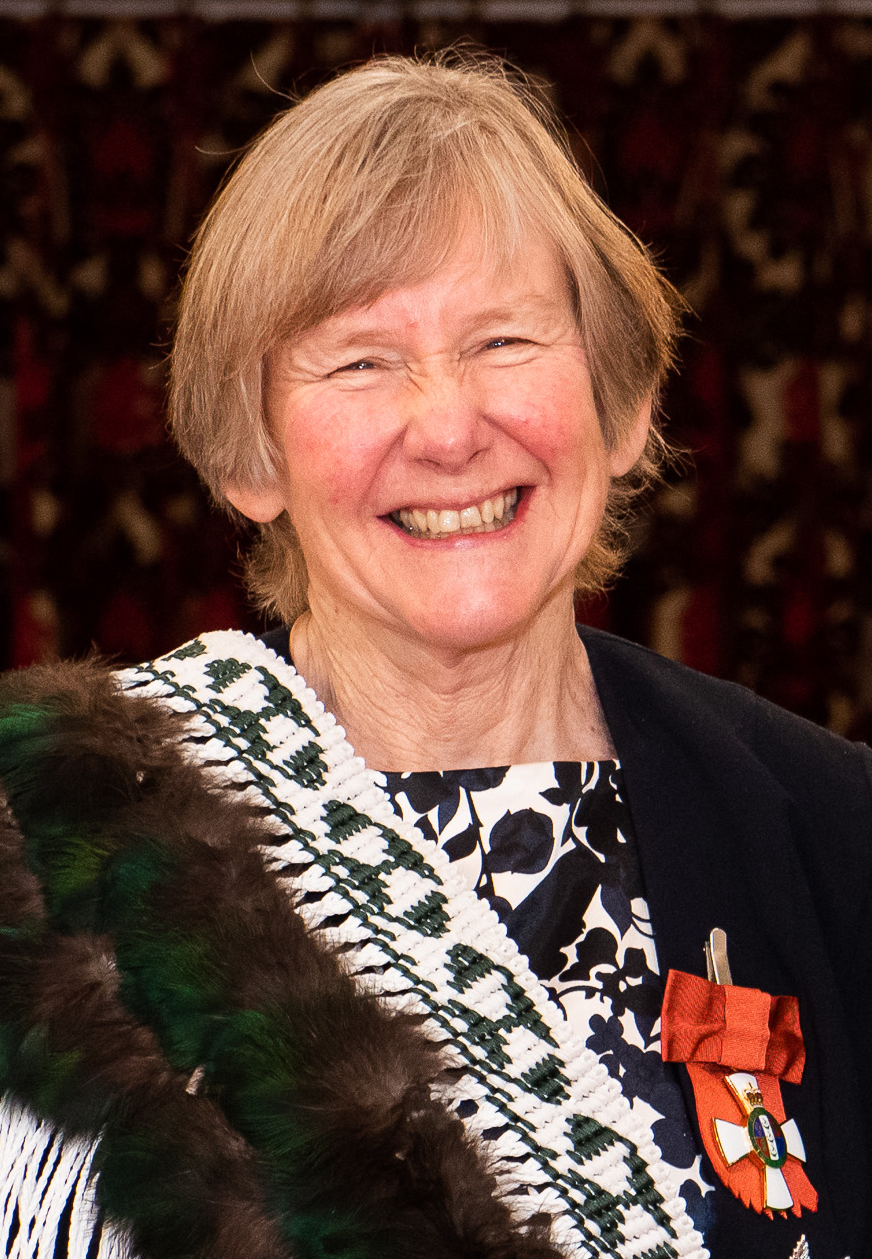
Sue Bagshaw

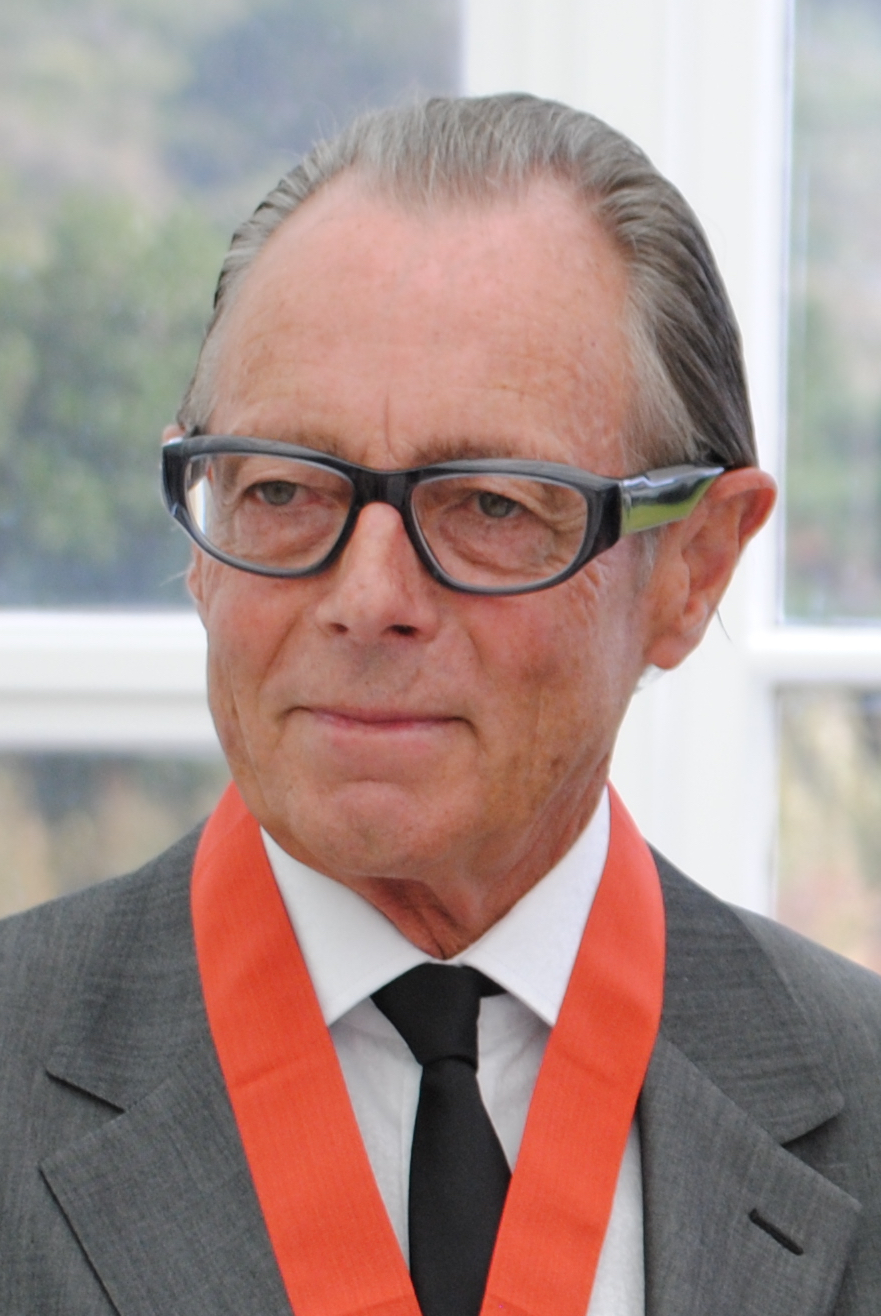
Michael Hill

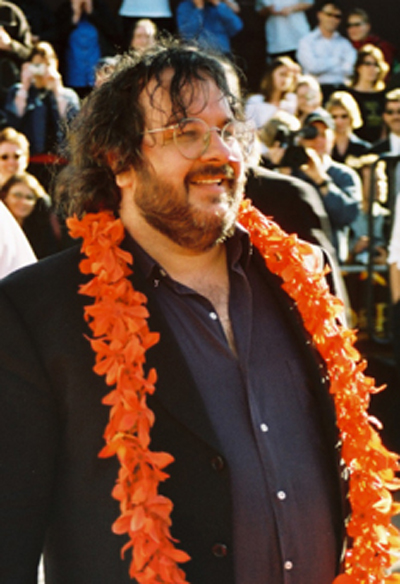
Peter Jackson

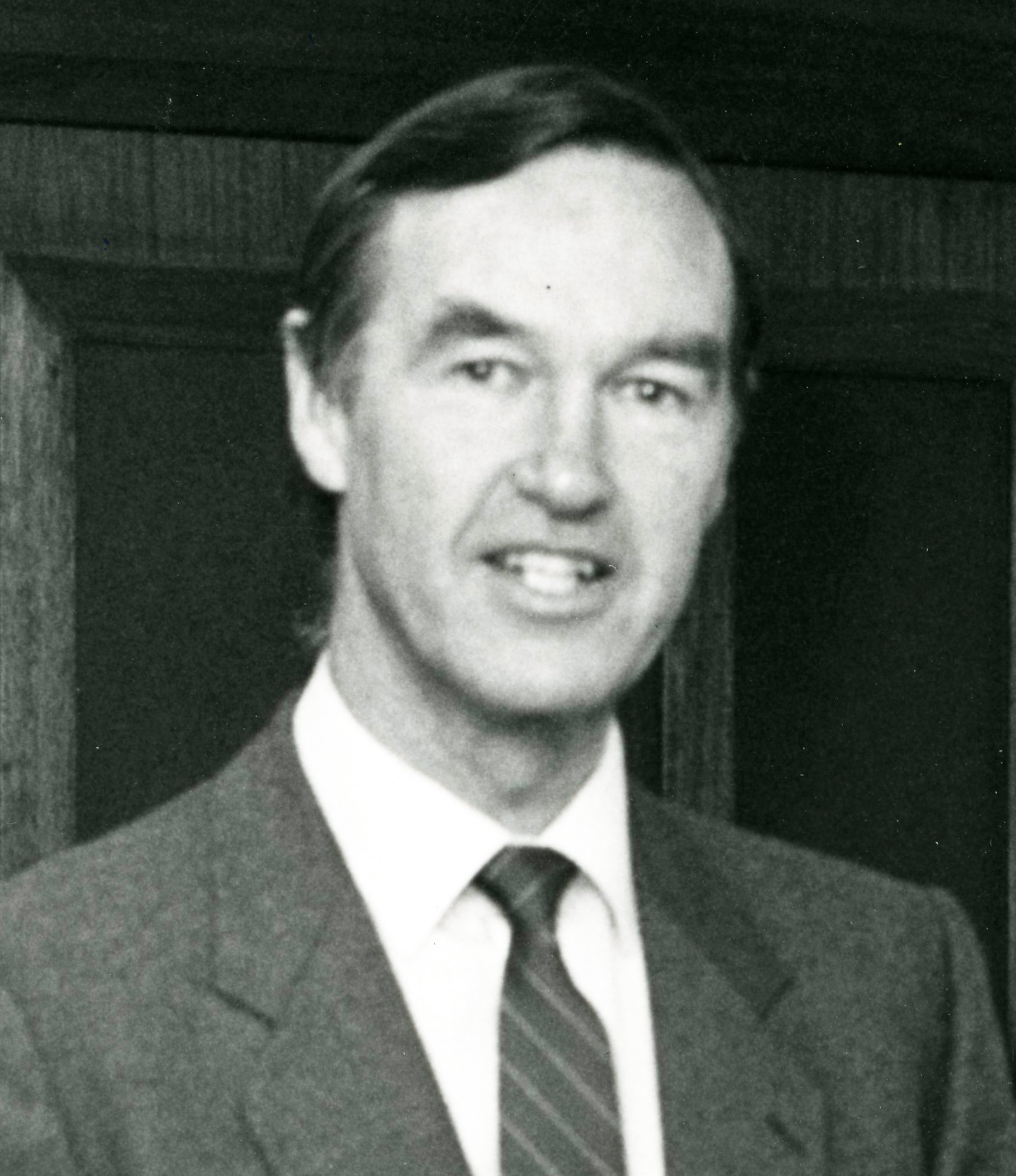
Bruce Ross

=== Officer (ONZM) ===
- George Ian Andrews – of Auckland. For services to television.
- Dr Margaret Ann Carr – of Hamilton. For services to early childhood education.
- Dr Neil James Cherry – of Christchurch. For services to science, education and the community.
- The Reverend Terence Montague Dibble – of Auckland. For services to justice and peace issues.
- Esther Frances Fung – of Wellington. For services to the Chinese community.
- Dr William Ivan Glass – of Christchurch. For services to occupational health and safety.
- The Reverend Haki Rangikaheke Petera Haimona JP – of Taihape. For services to Māori.
- June Hamilton – of Napier. For services to health administration and the community.
- Dr Michael Donald Hills – of Hamilton. For services to persons with epilepsy and the community.
- Noel Cowburn Lynch – of Wellington. For services to rowing and music.
- Trevor John McKee – of Auckland. For services to racing and the community.
- John Milbanke Masters MC JP – of Christchurch. For services to returned services personnel and the community.
- Gwen Meyer Neave JP – of Stewart Island. For services to art and the community.
- Richard John Northey – of Auckland. For public services.
- Gaylene Mary Preston – of Wellington. For services to film making.
- Erenora Puketapu-Hetet JP – of Lower Hutt. For services to weaving.
- Associate Professor Carole Marie Shepheard – of Auckland. For services to the arts.
- Emeritus Professor Russell Cyril James Stone – of Auckland. For services to historical research.
- Peter Ivan Talley – of Motueka. For services to the fishing industry, export and the community.
- Gilbert William Ullrich JP – of Auckland. For services to export.
- Lucinda Jane (Cindi) Wallace – of Wellington. For services to mental health.
- Jean Catherine Watson – of Wellington. For services to literature and welfare work.
- Dr Peter Stuart Watson – of Washington, D.C., United States of America. For services to New Zealand interests in the United States of America.
- Marie Helen Wills – of Christchurch. For services to the community.
- Colonel John Reginald McLeod – Colonels' List, New Zealand Army.
- Colonel Graeme Charles Wilson ED – Colonels' List, New Zealand Army Territorial Force.

Additional

- Wing Commander Carl Robert Nixon – Royal New Zealand Air Force.

Honorary

- Moin Mohammed Fudda – of Karachi, Pakistan. For services to New Zealand interests in Pakistan.
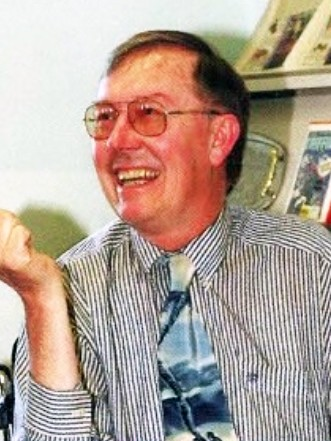
Neil Cherry

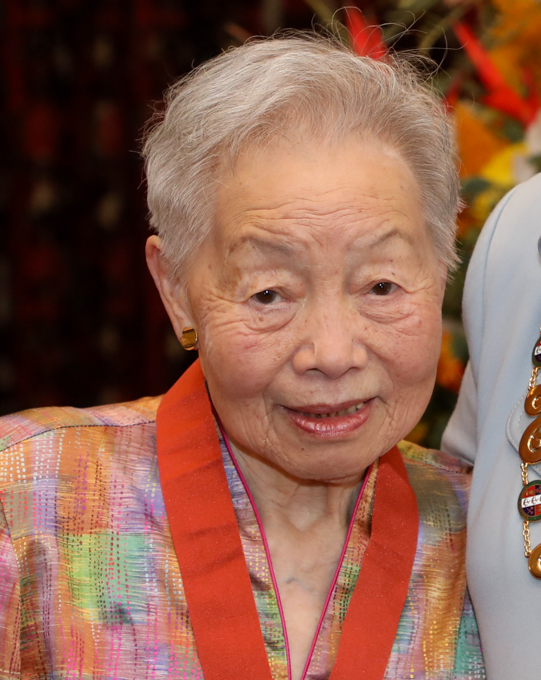
Esther Fung

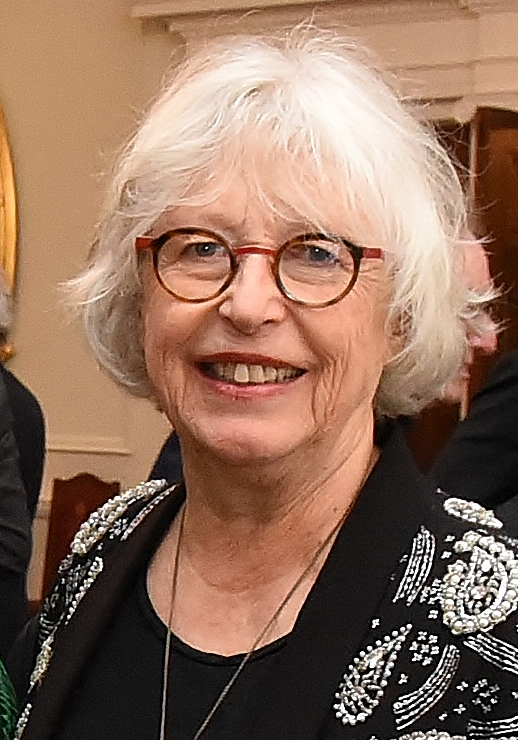
Gaylene Preston

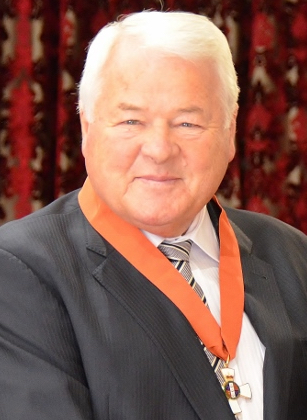
Peter Talley

=== Member (MNZM) ===
- Valerie Jeanne Abrahams – of Auckland. For services to persons with muscular dystrophy and the community.
- Phyllis Rosa Aston – of Nelson. For services to rural communities.
- Valerie Alice Ball – of Masterton. For services to the community.
- Marion Iris Batchelor – of Christchurch. For services to the community.
- Margaret Mary Bonner JP – of Wellington. For services to local-body and community affairs.
- Lim Nam Chhour – of Auckland. For services to the Chinese Cambodian community.
- Nansi Whetu Dewes – of Taumarunui. For services to Māori and the community.
- Thelma Joyce Earle – of Blenheim. For services to the community.
- Taonefoou Ogotau Falesima – of Auckland. For services to the community.
- Dr Stella Frances – of Kaiaua. For services to conservation and the environment.
- Emeritus Professor Colin Alexander Gibson – of Dunedin. For services to church music and education.
- Sister Helen Gilroy – of Wellington. For services to education and the community.
- Annesley Brian Harman – of Christchurch. For services to the community.
- Lesley Hazel Harrison – of Auckland. For services to the community.
- Isaac John Jefferson JP – of Tauranga. For services to the elderly and the community.
- Murray Raynal Jensen JP – of Raumati Beach. For services to local-body and community affairs.
- Jean Evelyn Kneebone JP – of Hamilton. For services to welfare work.
- Michael John Lynch – of Carterton. For services to community health in the South Pacific.
- Roderick Graham MacDiarmid – of Kerikeri. For services to horticulture and the community.
- Colin Alexander McDonald – of Christchurch. For services to the potato industry.
- Robert Bergen McGregor – of Napier. For services to the preservation of local heritage.
- John Gifford Male – of Warkworth. For services to the peace movement.
- Trevor Horowaewae Maxwell – of Rotorua. For services to Māori, arts and local-body affairs.
- Reginald Charles Moore – of Wainuiomata. For services to local government.
- John Roy Newton – of Tūrangi. For services to conservation.
- Calder Robert Prescott – of Dunedin. For services to music.
- Barbara Anne Redfern JP – of Hamilton. For services to migrants.
- Geraldine Hinemoa Reweti – of Bethlehem. For services to education.
- June Temamaeroa Rhind – of Pukekohe. For services to persons with disabilities.
- James Patrick Robson – of Christchurch. For services to conservation and the community.
- Evan William Rogerson – of Switzerland. For services to international relations.
- Moira Pareraututu Rolleston JP – of Lower Kaimai, Tauranga. For services to the community.
- Chhotubhai Sima JP – of Auckland. For services to the Indian community.
- Dr Neil Andrew Sinclair – of Putāruru. For services to the arts and the community.
- Horace William Smith – of Auckland. For services to refugees.
- Beverley Rae Sturgeon JP – of Tokoroa. For services to local government, education and the community.
- Rangitihi Rangiwaiata Tahuparae – of Wellington. For services to Māori.
- Graham Fradelle Tapper – of Christchurch. For services to persons with disabilities.
- Joycelyn Konini Teasdale – of Runanga. For services to the community.
- Annie Tito-Nekeare JP – of Waitakere City. For services to the Pacific Islands community.
- Margaret Shirley Walker – of Nelson. For services to the community.
- Frances Rosemary Walsh – of Wellington. For services to film.
- Gabrielle Patricia Welsh – of Christchurch. For services to the community and persons with disabilities.
- Gwen Chadwin Wichman – of Manukau City. For services to the community.
- Pamela Rose Williams – of Christchurch. For services as a dietitian.
- Roy Alfred Williams – of Waitakere City. For services to athletics.
- Mark Rayne Willis – of Tūrangi. For services to karate.
- (Kenneth) Brian Wood – of Blackball. For services to the community.
- Commander Wayne Robert Edward Burroughs – Royal New Zealand Navy.
- Commander Alan Rex Edwards – Royal New Zealand Navy
- Lieutenant Colonel Mary Anne Catherine Schaab – Royal New Zealand Nursing Corps.
- Flight Lieutenant Nathan John MacDonald – Royal New Zealand Air Force.
- Lieutenant Ross Murray James – of Christchurch, Royal New Zealand Infantry Regiment.
- Flight Sergeant Brigitte Lee Troughton – Royal New Zealand Air Force.
- Acting Chief Petty Officer Marine Technician (Electrical) Douglas Ivan John Marusich – Royal New Zealand Navy.

Additional

- Warrant Officer Class One Peleti Mark Hunter – Royal New Zealand Infantry Regiment.

Honorary

- Margaretha Hendrika Johanna Stronks – of Christchurch. For services to youth and the community.
- Professor Shunsuke Takahashi – of Tokyo, Japan. For services to karate.
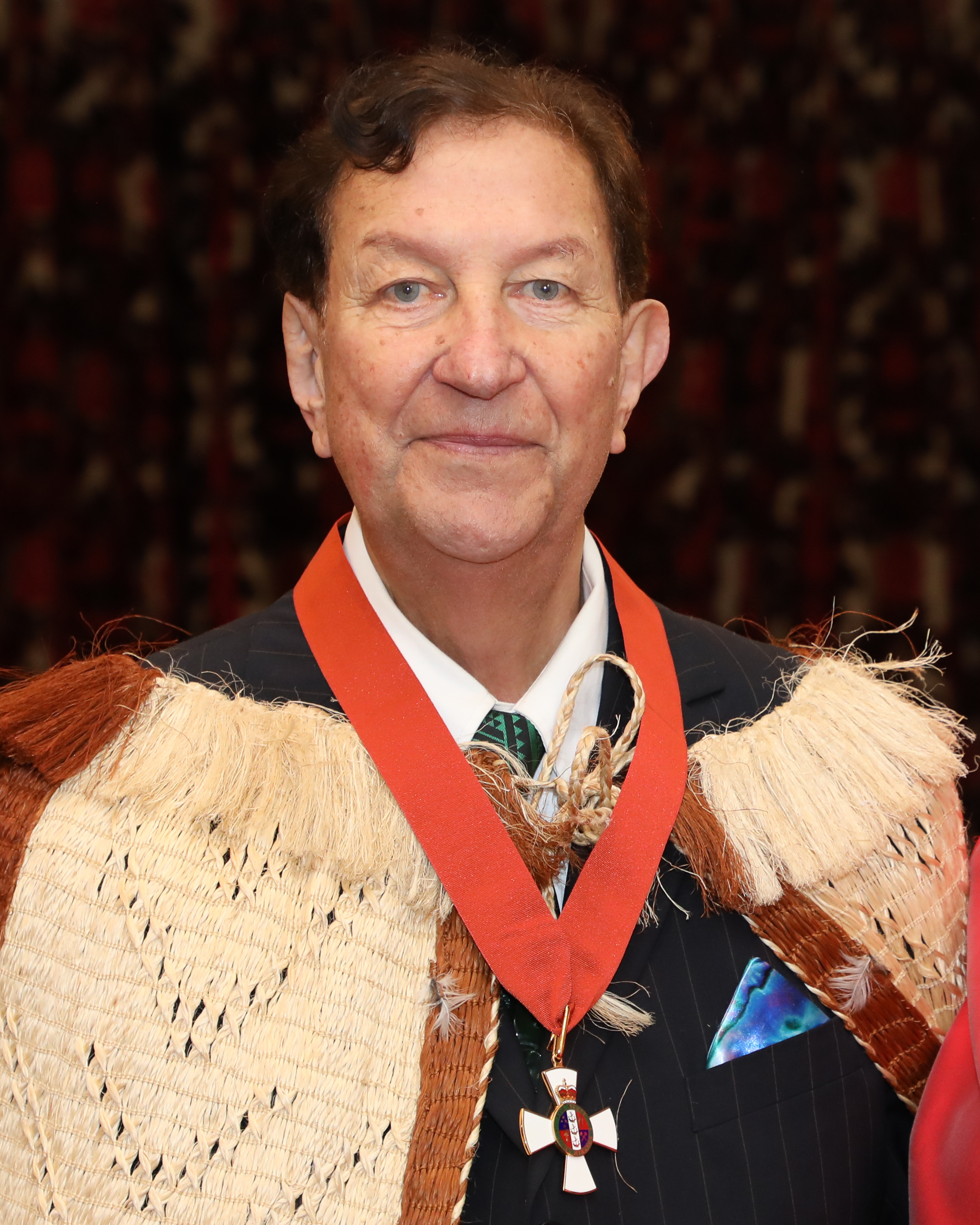
Trevor Maxwell

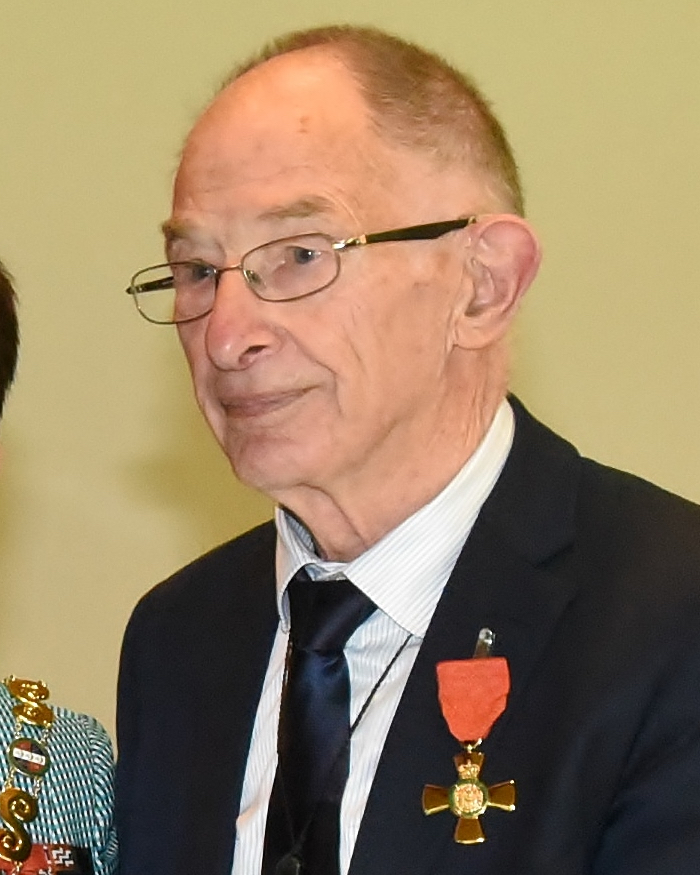
Neil Sinclair

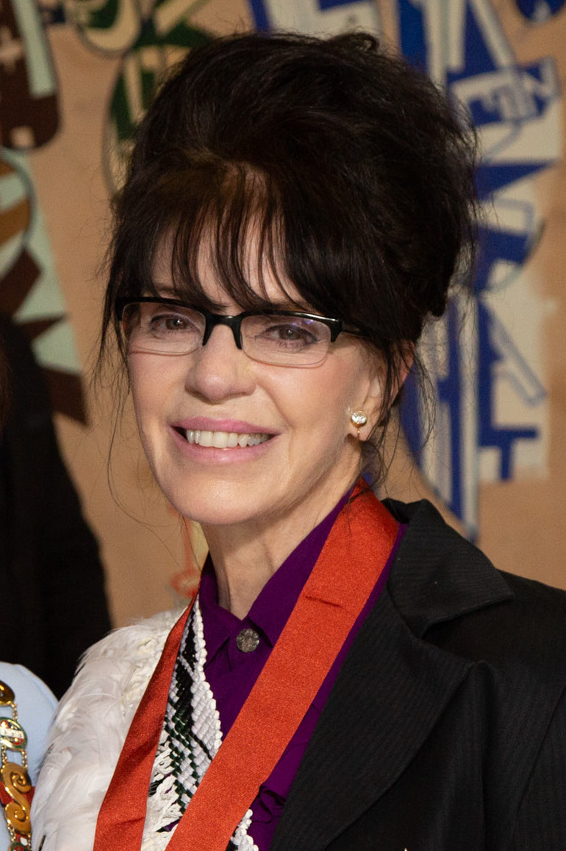
Fran Walsh

== Companion of the Queen's Service Order (QSO) ==
=== For community service ===
- Raewyn Maureen Bayliss – of Hamilton.
- Tilak Chandra JP – of Hamilton.
- The Very Reverend Bruce Andrew Hansen – of Christchurch.
- Shirley Margaret Heaphy JP – of Palmerston North.
- Eileen Joan Parore JP – of Whangārei.
- Dr Khalid Rashid Sandhu – of Wellington.
- The Reverend Brian Phillip Williscroft – of Dunedin.

=== For public services ===
- Anne Candy JP – of Manukau City.
- The Honourable Christine Elizabeth Fletcher – of Auckland.
- William Alexander Gavin – of Auckland.
- Mary Elizabeth Ogg – of Gore.
- Wynne Archdall Raymond JP – of Timaru.
- Claire Lois Stewart JP – of New Plymouth.
- Ted Mita Joseph Te Hae JP – of Christchurch.
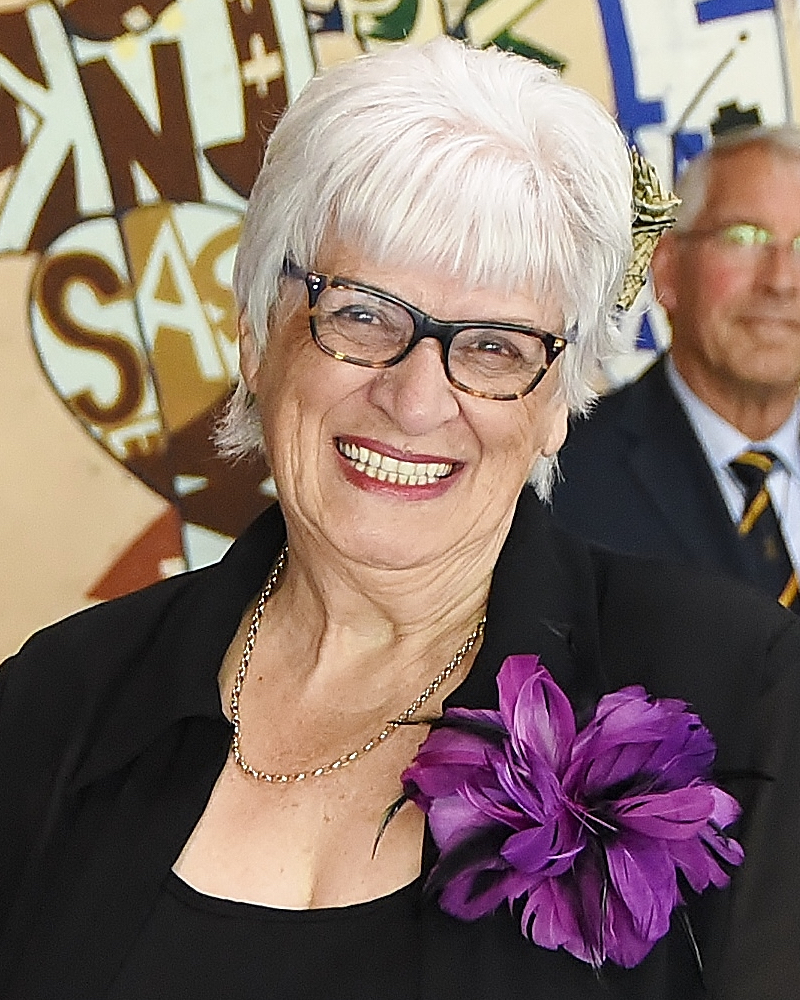
Anne Candy

== Queen's Service Medal (QSM) ==
=== For community service ===
- Glenys Ruby Anderson-Carter – of Rotorua.
- Graham Francis Barnett – of Mount Maunganui.
- Mary Mereiwa Broughton JP – of Lower Hutt.
- Thomas Falcon Brown – of Chatham Islands.
- June Elaine Carlton – of Katikati.
- Barrie Maxwell Cheyne – of Christchurch.
- Elsie May Connolly – of Westport.
- Hazel Muriel Pearl Crossley – of Auckland.
- Thomas Cheu Kwan Wong Doo – of Auckland.
- Marion Eileen Fisher – of Whangārei.
- Jean Gatton – of Kihikihi.
- Jennifer Anne Green – of South Dunedin.
- Eva Maud Hammond – of Rawene.
- Jack Stanley Harker – of Auckland.
- Anne Rebecca Hobbs – of Auckland.
- Donald Frank Hobbs – of Auckland.
- Edith Neale Houldsworth – of Wainuiomata.
- Loo-Chi Hu – of Christchurch.
- Brian James Inns – of New Plymouth.
- Richard William Jordan – of Kaiapoi.
- Noelene Joan Keller – of Christchurch.
- Lilian Grace Lawless – of Porirua City.
- Quang Long Le – of Auckland.
- Robert Lang McDonald – of Auckland.
- Raana Virginia Mareikur – of Ohakune.
- Molly Pamela Newman – of Upper Hutt.
- Keith William Parker – of Whangārei.
- Sister Kim Ngoc Pham (Sister Marie Benoit) – of Auckland.
- Ross Pearce Richardson JP – of Wanganui.
- Betty Kerford Roberts – of Christchurch.
- Norman Frederick Roberts – of Christchurch.
- Marlene Dale Shipman – of Wellington.
- Verona Lillian (Nonie) Smith – of Milton.
- Eric William Taylor – of Auckland.
- Vera Trebilcock – of Rangiora.
- Muriel Pimia Wehi – of Auckland.
- Loris Helen Wisheart – of Blenheim.
- Mrs Janice Zachan – of Napier.

=== For public services ===
- Raylene Margaret Atkinson – of Greymouth.
- William Joseph Beveridge – of Auckland.
- Walter Douglas Black JP – of Napier.
- Solo Brown – of Auckland.
- Joseph Lester Clark – of Auckland.
- Stuart Barry Cornford – of Wanganui.
- Leslie Desmond Eden – of Paihia.
- Filiamata Fiu (Mrs Filiamata Manuhiku Lukupa Fiu Ili) – of Auckland.
- Dr Ivan Philip Howie – of Great Barrier Island.
- Anthony Neal Hun – of Foxton.
- Murray Vickers Francis Jones – of Oamaru.
- Thuten Kesang – of Auckland.
- Joseph Martin Kuklinski – of Inglewood; chief fire officer, Inglewood Volunteer Fire Brigade.
- Kenneth Bruce McKinnon JP – of Ruatoria; lately chief fire officer, Ruatoria Volunteer Fire Brigade.
- Bruce John McLeod – of Napier.
- Matthew McMillan JP – of Auckland.
- Julie Patricia Manahi – of Waiheke Island.
- Mavis Ann Marett – of Auckland.
- Wilma Alison Marshall JP – of North Shore City.
- Francis Brent Martin – of Tauranga.
- Jack Milford – of Lower Hutt; constable, New Zealand Police.
- Alan Peter Mills – of Auckland; senior station officer, Remuera Fire Brigade.
- John Arthur Moller – of Kawerau.
- Michael William Moore – of Christchurch; lately senior sergeant, New Zealand Police.
- Frank David Moult – of Palmerston North; lately senior constable, New Zealand Police.
- Stephen John O'Connor – of Lower Hutt; sergeant, New Zealand Police.
- Frank Henry Papprill – of Wanganui.
- Rex William Powley JP – of Bluff.
- William Andrew Rees – of Wellington.
- Colin Gordon Robertson – of Invercargill.
- Valda Mary Slaney-Ellison – of Thames.
- Charles Keith Smith – of Evesham, Worcester, United Kingdom.
- Jacqueline Margaret Sutton – of Ōtaki.
- Iolesina Faigame Tagoilelagi – of Auckland.
- Helen Kathryn Unsworth JP – of Tauranga.
- Teoarani Tematengaro Waikari – of Gisborne.
- Barbara Ann Walter – of Auckland.
- Raymond Moverley Walter – of Auckland.
- John William Watson – of Havelock North; lately detective, New Zealand Police.
- Sandra June Yaxley – of Christchurch.
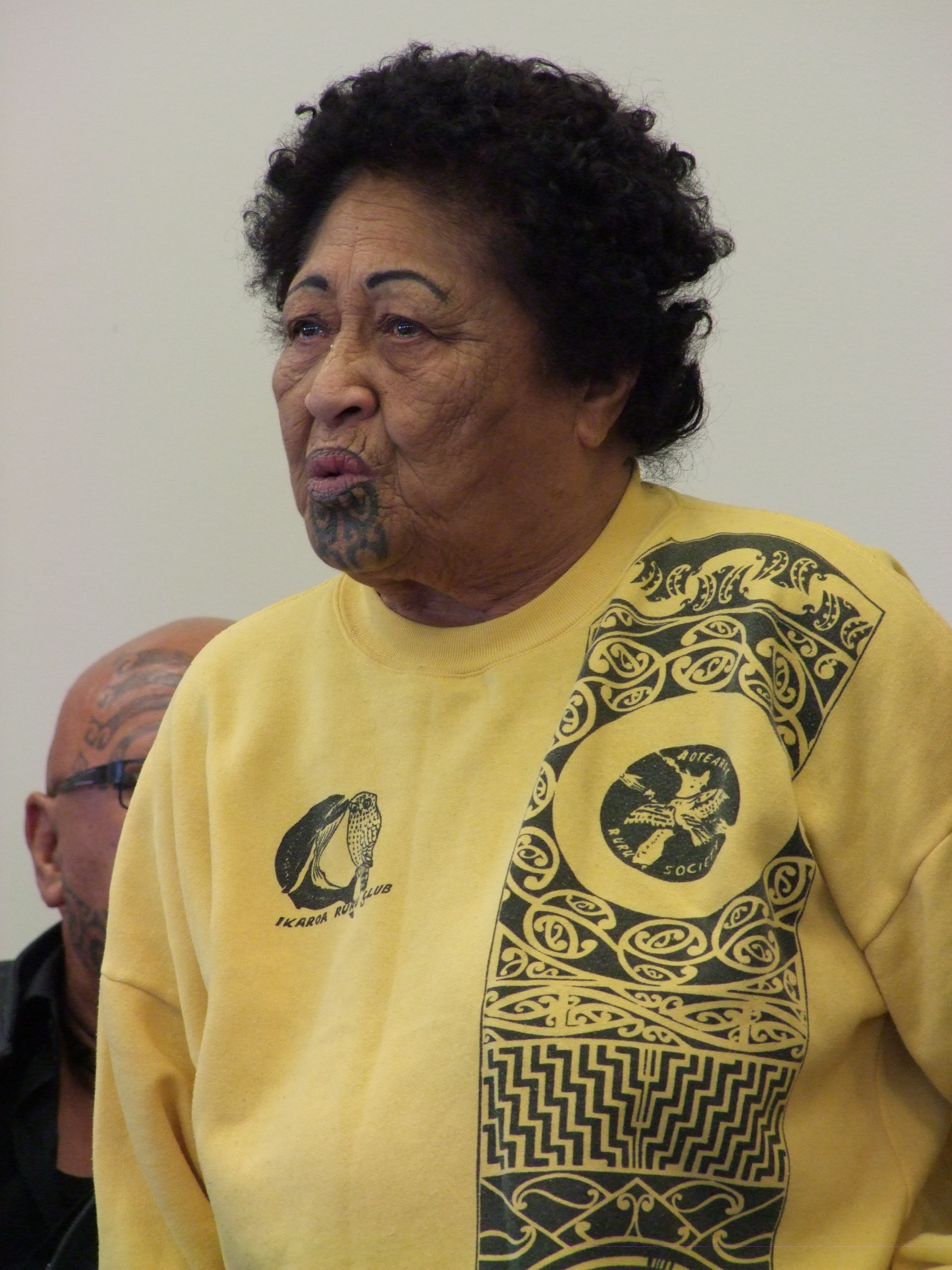
Mere Broughton
