= Jeremy Richardson (rugby union) =

Scotland international rugby union player

- Born: Jeremy Francis Richardson; 1 December 1961 (age 64) Crawley, England
- Notable relative(s): Fin Richardson, nephew

Rugby union career
- Position: Lock
Amateur team(s)
Years	Team	Apps	(Points)
- Edinburgh Academicals
Provincial / State sides
Years	Team	Apps	(Points)
- Edinburgh District
International career
Years	Team	Apps	(Points)
1987-90	Scotland 'B'	6	(0)
- Scotland 'A'
1994	Scotland	1	(0)

Jeremy Francis Richardson (born 7 September 1963) is a former Scotland international rugby union player.

== Early life ==
Richardson was born on 7 September 1963 in Crawley, England. His father Robert was an officer in the British Army. He studied at Heriot Watt University, graduating in 1986 with a business studies degree.

== Rugby Union career ==
=== Amateur career ===
He played club rugby for the Edinburgh Academicals.

=== Provincial career ===
He played for Edinburgh District. He was part of the Edinburgh side that won the 1986–87 Scottish Inter-District Championship.

=== International career ===
He was capped 6 times by Scotland 'B', the first of which was on 7 February 1987 against France 'B'.

He captained the Scotland 'A' team.

He gained one cap with the Scotland national rugby union team in 1994.

His one full senior international cap was against South Africa at Murrayfield on 19 November 1994.

He played a match for the Barbarians in 1995.

=== Administrative career ===
As a committee member of the Barbarians, he organised a match between them and his old club Edinburgh Academicals as part of the Accies 150th year celebrations.

== Business career ==
He founded Cornelian Asset Managers.
