= St Augustine's High School, Edinburgh =

Coordinates: 55°55′59″N 3°17′19″W

St. Augustine's R.C High School
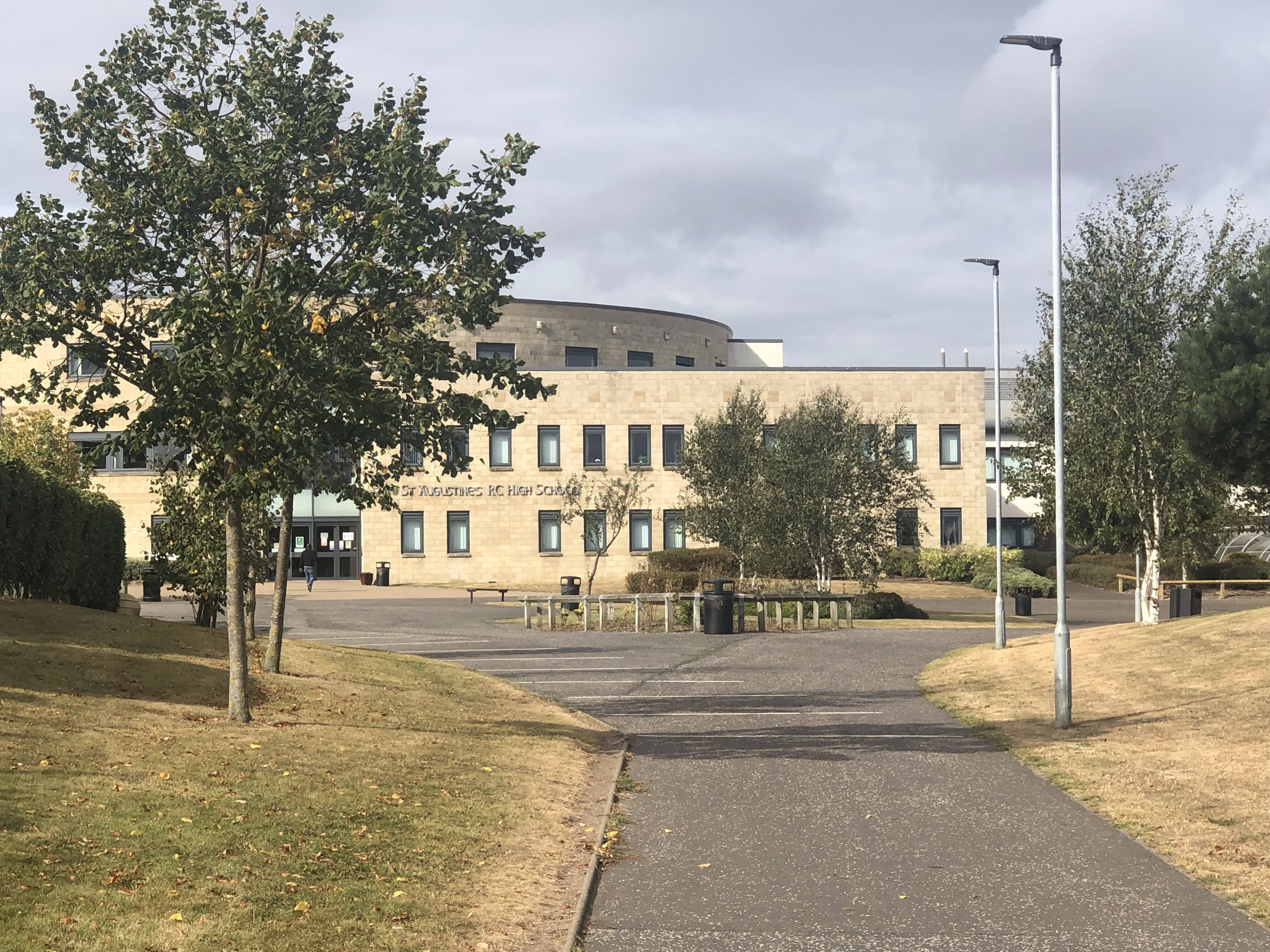
- The school in 2025

Location
- Broomhouse Road; Edinburgh, EH12 9AD; Scotland

Information
- Type: Secondary School
- Religious affiliation: Roman Catholic
- Established: August 1969
- Head Teacher: Antony O’Doherty
- Depute Head Teachers: Lesley-Ann Baird; Mr Frew; Mr McLauchlan
- Gender: Co-educational
- Age: 12 to 18
- Enrollment: 840
- Houses: Andrew; Bernadette; David; Margaret
- School years: S1-S6
- Diocese: St Andrews and Edinburgh
- Website: https://staugustinesrchs.uk/

St. Augustine's High School, established in 1969, is a Roman Catholic secondary school serving the west of Edinburgh, Scotland, with approximately 840 pupils.

== History ==
St. Augustine's RC High School was founded in August 1969. It was created on the Comprehensive School model by the merger of two existing Catholic schools: Holy Cross Academy, a selective secondary school which was established in Leith in 1907, and the non-selective St Andrew's Junior Secondary, which opened in 1962. St Augustine's moved to its present site serving the whole of the west of the city in August 1969.

The new school is named after St Augustine of Hippo.

=== New school ===
St Augustine's moved onto a shared campus with Forrester High School in January 2010. The new building is situated on the former football pitches of the school. The new building is split into two halves. On the side closest to Saughton Park is Forrester High School. On the opposite side is St Augustine's with the only shared area being the swimming pool. This is shared on a Rota basis and the students are never taught in the same area at the same time.

== Notable alumni ==
=== Holy Cross Academy ===
- Richard Demarco (born 1930), arts impresario
- Sir Tom Farmer (born 1940), entrepreneur
- Gordon Cardinal Gray (1910–1993), Archbishop of St Andrews and Edinburgh (1951–1985)
- Roy Geddes (1940–2006), chemist and biochemist in New Zealand
- Sir Francis McWilliams (1926–2022), engineer and former Lord Mayor of London (1992–1993)
- John Mackenzie (1928–2011), film director
- John McCluskey, Baron McCluskey (1929–2017), Solicitor General for Scotland (1974–1978)
- Keith Cardinal O'Brien (1938–2018), Archbishop of St Andrews and Edinburgh (1985–2013)
- Jimmy O'Rourke (1946–2022), footballer Hibernian F.C.
- Pat Stanton (born 1944), footballer Hibernian F.C., Scotland national football team

=== St Andrew's Junior Secondary ===
- Stuart Wood (born 1957), rhythm and bass guitarist and member of the 1970s band the Bay City Rollers.

=== St Augustine's High School ===
- Diana Barry (born 1986), former footballer
- Paul Cullen, Lord Pentland (born 1957), Solicitor General for Scotland (1995–1997), Senator of the College of Justice
- Alison Johnstone (born 1965), Green Member of the Scottish Parliament for Lothian region (2011–), Presiding Officer of the Scottish Parliament
- Angus MacKay (born 1964), Labour Member of the Scottish Parliament for Edinburgh South (Scottish Parliament constituency) (1999–2003), Minister for Finance and Local Government (2000–2001)
- Panashe Muzambe (born 1995), professional rugby union player, Scotland women's national rugby union team
- Jare Oguntibeju (born 2002), professional rugby union player, Scotland national rugby union team
