= 2002 New Zealand Royal Visit Honours =

Awards list for New Zealand

2002 Royal Visit Honours
- Previous: 2002 New Year Honours; Next: 2002 Queen's Birthday and Golden Jubilee Honours
- Type: New Zealand royal honours: Royal Victorian Order
- Date: 22 February 2002
- Country: New Zealand

Highlights
- Total recipients: 1

The 2002 New Zealand Royal Visit Honours was an appointment by Elizabeth II to the Royal Victorian Order, to mark her visit to New Zealand in February that year as part of her golden jubilee celebrations. The only appointment, dated 22 February 2002, was of Leanne Woon, who served as equerry to the Queen during the visit. Woon was the first woman to serve in that capacity.

The recipient is listed here as she was styled before her new honour.

== Royal Victorian Order ==
=== Member (MVO) ===
- Squadron Leader Leanne Woon – Royal New Zealand Air Force
