= Sue Bagshaw =

New Zealand doctor (born 1949)

Dame Sue Bagshaw DNZM
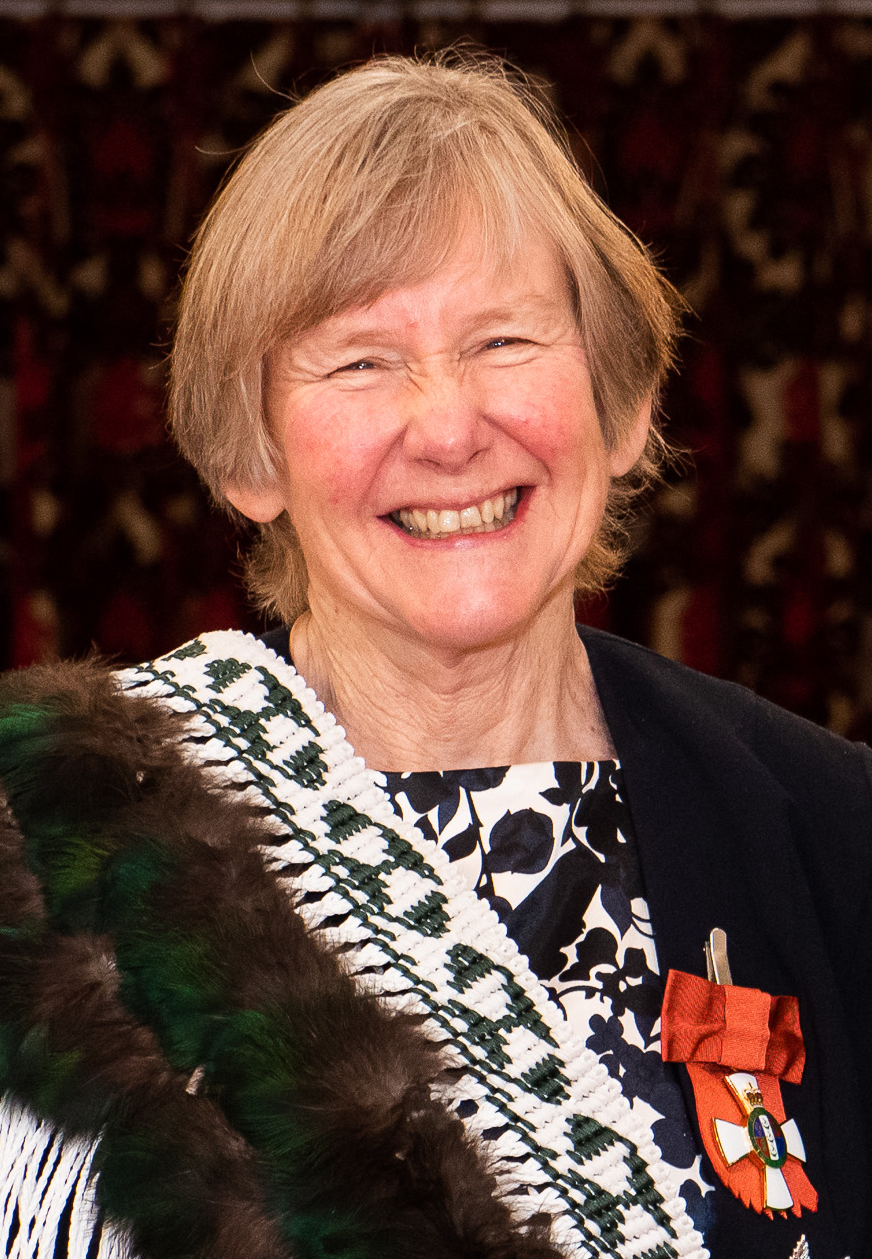
- Bagshaw in 2019
- Born: Susan Nicola Dean; 30 September 1949 (age 77); Hong Kong
- Spouse: Phil Bagshaw
- Children: 4

Dame Susan Nicola Bagshaw DNZM (née Dean, born 30 September 1949) is a New Zealand doctor specialising in the health needs of young people.

== Early life and education ==
Bagshaw was born in Hong Kong on 30 September 1949. She grew up there and attended a Church of England girls' boarding school. Bagshaw studied at the University of London, where she obtained a BSc degree Cum Laude in Biochemistry in 1971 and subsequently an MB BS degree in 1974.

== Professional career ==
She moved to Christchurch, New Zealand, in the early 1980s. She initially worked for the Family Planning Association to improve access to sexual and reproductive health services for young women by expanding the number of clinics in the South Island. However she found that young people were too embarrassed or shy to attend the clinics and instead she designed a "one-stop shop" model, which provided a range of health services in one place.

In 1995, Bagshaw established a youth health centre in central Christchurch that offered free doctor's appointments, counselling and addiction support services for young people. The centre closed in 2010 due to a lack of funding. In 2012 she opened a replacement youth hub in Barbadoes Street, which brought together 16 youth organisations in one facility. In April 2023, while remaining a patron, Bagshaw stepped down from her lead role in the centre which had been re-branded as Te Tahi Youth. She said it would allow her more time to develop a new project and open a "youth hub designed to connect services like mental health with education, transitional housing, employment, and training, and adding a creative arts centre and place for recreation".

Bagshaw is a senior lecturer in paediatrics at the University of Otago in Christchurch and is the chair of the Korowai Youth Well-Being Trust and a trustee for the Collaborative for Research and Training in Youth Health and Development, which she founded. She serves on the board of the Canterbury Charity Hospital Trust.

Bagshaw has also pioneered gender affirming care for transgender people. In late September 2022, Bagshaw advocated the use of puberty blockers for children and young people wanting to transition from their assigned genders, stating that "otherwise you get irreversible effects from their normal puberty which then need a lot of surgery, etcetera, to reverse... breast development and things like that." She argued that puberty blockers eased children's distress and allowed them to fully explore their gender options. In April 2024, Bagshaw maintained that puberty blockers were "safe and reversible" despite the Ministry of Health removing a claim that they were "safe and reversible" from its website last year. She said that "most kids know what they want, most kids know what they are. And that's confirmed with time, so they do carry on with the hormones." She regarded opposition to puberty blockers as a "moral panic".

In November 2025, Bagshaw criticised the New Zealand Government's decision to suspend the issuing of puberty blockers to new clients pending a major British clinical review due in 2031. She argued that puberty blockers were safe and warned against "moral panics".

== Recognition ==
Bagshaw is Fellow of the Australasian Chapter of Sexual Health Medicine (FRACShM) of the Royal Australasian College of Physicians, and Fellow of the Royal New Zealand College of General Practitioners (FRNZCGP).

In the 2002 New Year Honours, she was appointed a Companion of the New Zealand Order of Merit (CNZM), for services to youth health. In the 2019 Queen's Birthday Honours, she was promoted to Dame Companion of the same Order (DNZM), also for services to youth health.

== Personal life ==
Bagshaw is married to Phil Bagshaw, who she met at medical school in London. Together they have four children. In the 2019 New Year Honours, her husband was appointed a Companion of the New Zealand Order of Merit, for services to health. Her son Andrew, who lived in the United Kingdom, was killed in Ukraine in 2023 while doing voluntary humanitarian work during the Russo-Ukrainian War. On 14 August 2023, The Quiet Hero, a book about the Bagshaws' son, was released.

== Publications ==
Bagshaw co-authored Calming Your Child, De-escalating Tantrums, Anxiety, Aggression and Other Challenging Behaviours in 2022. Writing of the book, Bagshaw noted the need to understand children's behaviours from their perspective, suggesting "a tantrum might be due to the child being scared, distressed or overwhelmed and when we understand the 'why' behind the behaviour, we can look at techniques to address it."
