= Fin Richardson =

Scottish rugby union player (born 1998)

- Born: 16 September 1998 (age 28) Colchester, England
- Height: 1.83 m (6 ft 0 in)
- Weight: 124 kg (273 lb)
- School: Cargilfield Preparatory School; Merchiston Castle School
- Notable relative: Jeremy Richardson (uncle)

Rugby union career
- Position: Tighthead Prop
- Current team: Glasgow Warriors
Amateur team(s)
Years	Team	Apps	(Points)
–	Currie		
-	Edinburgh Academicals		
2021–22	Exeter University		
Senior career
Years	Team	Apps	(Points)
2022–24	Exeter Chiefs	1	(0)
2022–23	→ Plymouth Albion		
2023–24	→ Cornish Pirates	20	(5)
2024–	Glasgow Warriors	15	(0)
International career
Years	Team	Apps	(Points)
	Scotland U20	10	(20)
2024	Scotland 'A'	1	(0)
2025	Scotland	1	(0)

Fin Richardson (born 16 September 1998) is a Scotland international rugby union player for Glasgow Warriors. He has previously played for Currie and Edinburgh Academicals.

== Rugby Union career ==
=== Amateur career ===
Introduced to rugby union at Cargilfield Preparatory School in Edinburgh, he was moved on to Merchiston Castle School. He played for Currie and Edinburgh Academicals, before moving south to go to study at Exeter University. He then played for the university rugby union team Exeter University.

=== Professional career ===
He was signed by Exeter Chiefs in season 2022–23. He was given a dual registration with allowed him to also play with Plymouth Albion in the first year, and then Cornish Pirates in the second year.

On 15 May 2024 it was announced that he had signed for Glasgow Warriors for season 2024–25. He became Glasgow Warrior No. 364 on his competitive debut in a 17 - 15 win over Scarlets at Scotstoun Stadium on 29 November 2024. Richardson said: "It went really well. Can’t beat a win on debut. It feels pretty good. I wanted to rise to the occasion. I felt like it was pretty seamless and something we’ve been training for. Being a team like Glasgow, everyone is trying to do the same thing all the time. Everyone is on the same page. Even when there’s a switch in personnel, everyone’s one mind. I think that really brings cohesion to the squad. It was brilliant. I’ve never played in front of a crowd this loud, so it took a bit of getting used to. When the noise rises, you really feel the push and the energy from the crowd."

=== International career ===
He has represented Scotland U20s in both the Six Nations Championship and World Championship matches.

He was capped in the Scotland 'A' international match against Chile on 23 November 2024.

He was called up to the Scotland squad for their summer tour in 2025. He played in their non-cap match against Māori All Blacks, but made his senior debut playing against Samoa on 18 July 2025.
