= Richie Simpson =

Scottish rugby union player (born 2003)

- Born: 14 January 2003 (age 23) Irvine, Scotland
- Height: 1.82 m (6 ft 0 in)
- Weight: 82 kg (12 st 13 lb)
- School: Wellington School, Ayr
- University: Glasgow Caledonian University

Rugby union career
- Position: Fly half
Amateur team(s)
Years	Team	Apps	(Points)
-	Ayr		
Senior career
Years	Team	Apps	(Points)
2023-25	Glasgow Warriors	0	(0)
2025-	Ealing Trailfinders	1	(8)
Super Rugby
Years	Team	Apps	(Points)
2022-24	Ayrshire Bulls		
International career
Years	Team	Apps	(Points)
2023	Scotland U20	4	(30)

Richie Simpson (born 14 January 2003) is a Scottish rugby union player. He now plays for Ealing Trailfinders. He previously played for Glasgow Warriors and Ayrshire Bulls.

== Rugby Union career ==
=== Amateur career ===
Simpson played rugby with Ayr. He started with Ayr minis in primary school, then played with Wellington School and Ayr until under 18s. He played with Ayr when the amateur game returned after the coronavirus outbreak.

=== Professional career ===
He was noticed by Glasgow Warriors early on and he played for them in their Under 18 side against Saracens youth side in London in 2019. He went on to play for Glasgow U20s and was involved in Glasgow's junior academy since 2021.

He signed a contract with Ayrshire Bulls in 2022 and played for them in the Super 6 league. His performances took the Bulls to the Super 6 final. Simpson's Ayrshire Bulls side played Glasgow Warriors on 2 September 2022. The Bulls received plaudits for their performance by losing narrowly to Glasgow 22-17.

Simpson joined Glasgow Warriors on a partnership contract with Ayrshire Bulls in 2023. When the Ayrshire Bulls folded in 2024 he was kept on at the Warriors in their academy system as a Stage 3 professional player.

He played for Glasgow Warriors 'A' in their match against Boroughmuir Bears on 20 April 2024 in the Super Series. The Glasgow side narrowly lost 20-24 but Simpson scored a try. He also played for Glasgow Warriors 'A' against his old club Ayrshire Bulls on 25 May 2024. Glasgow won that match with Simpson and his Warriors academy fly-half stablemate Matthew Urwin both nailing conversions.

He was a replacement for Glasgow Warriors in their match against Zebre Parma on 30 August 2024 and a replacement for Glasgow Warriors 'A' in their match against Edinburgh 'A' on 27 September 2024. He started Glasgow U23 match against Benetton Treviso U23 with Simpson running riot and scoring a try and 4 conversions in a 52-20 points victory. He also was a replacement in Glasgow Warriors 'A' match against Georgia's Black Lion side on 22 May 2025.

On 25 June 2025 it was announced that Simpson had signed for English side Ealing Trailfinders.

=== International career ===
He played for Scotland U20 in the U20 Six Nations Championship in 2022-23 season.

== Outside rugby ==
Simpson was a keen cricketer and played both cricket and rugby until he signed his professional contract with the Ayrshire Bulls. He was also at Glasgow Caledonian University studying Finance, Investment and Risk from 2020 to 2024.
