= Duncan Munn =

Scottish rugby union player (born 2003)

- Born: 28 May 2003 (age 23) Glasgow, Scotland
- Height: 6 ft 1 in (1.85 m)
- Weight: 94 kg (207 lb; 14 st 11 lb)
- School: Kelvinside Academy

Rugby union career
- Position(s): Centre, Wing
Amateur team(s)
Years	Team	Apps	(Points)
- Loch Lomond
- West of Scotland
- Cartha Queens Park
Senior career
Years	Team	Apps	(Points)
2022–	Glasgow Warriors	6	(0)
Super Rugby
Years	Team	Apps	(Points)
2021–23	Boroughmuir Bears		
International career
Years	Team	Apps	(Points)
- Scotland U16
2022–23	Scotland U20	14	(0)

Duncan Munn (born 28 May 2003) is a Scottish rugby union player who plays for Glasgow Warriors at the Centre or Wing position.

== Rugby Union career ==
=== Amateur career ===
Duncan, from Alexandria, played with local club Loch Lomond from the age of 5, before moving on to West of Scotland and Cartha Queens Park.

=== Professional career ===
He played with the Boroughmuir Bears in the Super 6 tournament in 2021.

After impressing with the Bears, Munn joined Glasgow Warriors in 2022, initially with the Scottish Rugby Academy, before graduating from the academy with a permanent partnership deal with the Glasgow Warriors and Boroughmuir Bears in 2023.

He played for Glasgow Warriors 'A' side against the Super 6 sides Ayrshire Bulls and Boroughmuir Bears in the 2022–23 season in April 2023.

He played in the pre-season matches for Glasgow Warriors against Ulster and Zebre in the 2023–24 season.

He played for Glasgow Warriors 'A' side against Edinburgh 'A' in November 2023, scoring a try in that match.

He then made his competitive debut for the Warriors against Cardiff Rugby on 22 March 2024 in the United Rugby Championship in a hard-fought win which took the Warriors joint top of the URC league. He became Glasgow Warrior No. 360. He signed a pro deal with the club on 17 April 2025.

=== International career ===
Munn came through the age grades for Scotland playing at Under 16 and Under 20s.

Munn co-captained the Scotland U20 in the 2023 Six Nations tournament.

== Personal life ==
Munn grew up in Alexandria, West Dunbartonshire and attended Vale of Leven Academy and Kelvinside Academy. He was a boyhood Glasgow Warriors supporter.
