= Callum Norrie =

Scottish rugby union player who is also English Qualified (born 2004)

- Born: 2 January 2004 (age 22) Redditch, England
- Height: 6 ft 3 in (1.91 m)
- Weight: 125 kg (276 lb; 19 st 10 lb)
- School: Strathallan School

Rugby union career
- Position: Prop
Amateur team(s)
Years	Team	Apps	(Points)
-	Howe of Fife		
Senior career
Years	Team	Apps	(Points)
2022–2025	Glasgow Warriors	0	(0)
2024–25	→ Ampthill	33	(15)
2025-26	Ampthill	33	(15)
Super Rugby
Years	Team	Apps	(Points)
2022–23	Stirling Wolves		
International career
Years	Team	Apps	(Points)
2022–25	Scotland U20	23	(40)
2024	Emerging Scotland	1	(0)

Callum Norrie (born 2 January 2004) is an Emerging Scotland international rugby union player who plays for Ampthill in the English Championship , at the Prop position.He is also English Qualified He was previously an academy player for Glasgow Warriors. He previously played for Howe of Fife and Stirling Wolves.

== Rugby Union career ==
=== Amateur career ===
He played for Howe of Fife from Primary 3.

He moved to Strathallan School and played for their school side from 2018 to 2022.

=== Professional career ===
He joined the Stirling Wolves in the Super 6 tournament from 2022.

After impressing with the Wolves, Norrie joined Glasgow Warriors in 2022, as part of their Scottish Rugby Academy summer intake.

He was loaned out to English Championship side Ampthill in November 2024. He played 33 times for the Bedfordshire club so far.

=== International career ===
Norrie played for the Scotland U20s from 2022 to 2025.

He played for Emerging Scotland against Italy under 23s on 14 December 2024.
