= Callum Smyth =

Scottish rugby union player (born 2004)

- Born: 4 February 2004 (age 22) Kettering, England
- Height: 1.86 m (6 ft 1 in)
- Weight: 109 kg (17 st 2 lb)
- School: Bedford School
- University: Heriot Watt University; Stellenbosch University

Rugby union career
- Position: Prop
Amateur team(s)
Years	Team	Apps	(Points)
-	Kettering		
2022-23	Selkirk		
Senior career
Years	Team	Apps	(Points)
2021-22	Northampton Saints	0	(0)
2023–25	Glasgow Warriors		
2025-	Worcester Warriors	3	(0)
Super Rugby
Years	Team	Apps	(Points)
2023-24	Fosroc Future XV		
International career
Years	Team	Apps	(Points)
2022	Scotland U18		
2024	Scotland U20	4	(0)
2024	Emerging Scotland	1	(0)

Callum Smyth (born 4 February 2004) is a Emerging Scotland international rugby union player. He plays for Worcester Warriors. He previously played for Glasgow Warriors, Selkirk and FOSROC Future XVs.

== Rugby Union career ==
=== Amateur career ===
Smyth started playing rugby with Kettering.

After playing for Scotland Under 18s, Smyth decided to move to Scotland and moved to Galashiels. He played for Selkirk in the Scottish Premiership.

At the start of 2023, he was named as a scholarship recipient of the prestigious John Macphail Scholarship and went to South Africa for 5 months to play and train at Stellenbosch University.

=== Professional career ===
He was in the Northampton Saints academy.

Smyth joined the Glasgow Warriors academy system in 2023. The Warriors academy was a step up in intensity; and Smyth explained: "Again the step up has been massive but it’s really good and beneficial. [Training] with the likes of Oli Kebble and Allan Dell who have played in my position, they can talk to me and give me their wisdom and experience and coach me in a way. I think I’ve thrived, I think I’ve been doing quite well. I’ve just loved every second of it. I think the big step up for me was managing the workload we have at Glasgow Warriors – it’s a lot harder of a workload and being involved with the pros, it’s more than just a hobby – now it’s your job."

He was named in the FOSROC Future XV side - an additional side that would play in the Super 6 and captained the side.

He played for Glasgow Warriors 'A' side against Edinburgh 'A' on 24 November 2023; against Super 6 side Boroughmuir Bears on 20 April 2024, scoring a try for the Warriors; and started against Super 6 side Ayrshire Bulls on 25 May 2024. being replaced by Allan Dell.

The following season he played for Glasgow Warriors 'A' against Edinburgh 'A' on 27 September 2024; and against Black Lion on 22 May 2025. In between he played for Glasgow Warriors Under 23 side against Benetton Under 23 on 6 May 2025.

On 13 June 2025 it was announced that Smyth had signed for Worcester Warriors. Of the move Smyth said: "I’m really excited for this new chapter at Worcester Warriors. There’s something special about building a team from the ground up and creating a culture where we work hard for each other, raise standards and enjoy the journey together."

=== International career ===
Smyth is Scottish Qualified through his mother's side of the family. Both his mother and maternal grandparent are Scottish. His father is Irish. He was noticed by Scotland while playing for his school in the Merchiston Castle School festival; and he made his Scotland Under 18 debut in 2022, against France U18 in that year's Under 18 Six Nations tournament.

Smyth explained his Scottish affiliation: "Since I was as young as I can remember I have always supported Scotland, my mum just kind of drilled it into me! All my rugby jerseys at home are Scottish, I have supported them since day one really and in the back of my mind I was always hopeful of going down that route."

He was selected for Scotland U20s to play the U20s Six Nations tournament. Smyth said: "Getting selected for the U20’s was a brilliant feeling, I’ve sacrificed so much this year and I’m really looking forward to playing on the bigger stage. I’m loving living in Scotland, training with Glasgow Warriors and the U20’s. It has brought the very best out of me and I’m taking in the whole experience. I’m driven to perform and give my very best as a player but ultimately this year I’m excited and proud to represent Scotland." He was capped 4 times.

Smyth was named in the first Emerging Scotland squad in December 2024. He came on as a replacement in the match against Italy U-23 side on 14 December 2024.

Sporting positions
Preceded by No awards - coronavirus	John Macphail Scholarship; Guy Kirkpatrick; Monroe Job; Callum Smyth; 2023	Succeeded by Ben White; Josh Arnold; Jack Craig
