= Jare Oguntibeju =

Scottish rugby union player (born 2002)

- Full name: Olujare Oguntibeju
- Born: 14 May 2002 (age 24) Bloemfontein, South Africa
- Height: 2.03 m (6 ft 8 in)
- Weight: 123 kg (271 lb)
- School: St Augustine’s High School

Rugby union career
- Position: Lock
- Current team: Glasgow Warriors
Amateur team(s)
Years	Team	Apps	(Points)
2021-22	Brunel University		
Senior career
Years	Team	Apps	(Points)
2021	Edinburgh	0	(0)
2021–23	Ealing Trailfinders		
2024–	Glasgow Warriors	14	(10)
Super Rugby
Years	Team	Apps	(Points)
2024	Stirling Wolves		
International career
Years	Team	Apps	(Points)
2022	Scotland U20	2	(0)
2024	Scotland 'A'	1	(0)
2025	Emerging Scotland	1	(0)

Jare Oguntibeju (born 14 May 2002) is a Scottish professional rugby union player who plays lock for United Rugby Championship side Glasgow Warriors.

== Early life ==
He was born in South Africa to Nigerian parents but was brought up in Scotland from the age of 2 to 14 years old. He attended St Augustine's High School in Edinburgh playing football and basketball. He first took up rugby after making a deal with a biology teacher after returning to South Africa. He promised the teacher he would take up the sport if he failed to make a certain grade in the subject. He missed the grade by a few points and took rugby as a result at the age of 17.

== Rugby Union career ==
=== Amateur career ===
He played for Brunel University in London, in season 2021–22, while with Ealing Trailfinders.

=== Professional career ===
He had a trial with Edinburgh Rugby in 2021.

He joined Ealing Trailfinders.

He joined Stirling Wolves for the Super Series competition in early 2024.

==== Glasgow Warriors ====
He joined Glasgow Warriors academy in the summer of 2024. He started both pre-season games in September 2024, against Zebre and Connacht and played in the Glasgow Warriors 'A' match against Edinburgh 'A'. He became Glasgow Warrior No. 365 on his competitive debut in a 17 - 15 win over Scarlets at Scotstoun Stadium on 29 November 2024. On 15 December 2024, in his first professional away game for Glasgow he scored his first try for the club in a 30–29 loss to Toulon in the Champions Cup. In February 2025, he signed his first professional contract with the club on an initial 2-year deal.

=== International career ===
Having been born in South Africa to Nigerian parents, he qualifies to play for Scotland on residency grounds having lived in Edinburgh during his youth.

He suffered ligament damage playing for Scotland U20s against Wales U20s in the 2022 U20s Six Nations Championship.

He was capped in the Scotland 'A' international match against Chile on 23 November 2024.

He made his debut for Emerging Scotland on 17 November 2025.
