= Aidan Cross (rugby union) =

Scottish rugby union player (born 2002)

- Born: 14 November 2001 (age 24) Scotland
- Height: 5 ft 11 in (1.80 m)
- Weight: 92 kg (203 lb; 14 st 7 lb)
- School: Stewart's Melville College

Rugby union career
- Position: Wing
Amateur team(s)
Years	Team	Apps	(Points)
- Stewart's Melville
2020-21	Melrose		
Senior career
Years	Team	Apps	(Points)
2022	Glasgow Warriors		
2024	Edinburgh Rugby		
2024–25	Glasgow Warriors		
2025	→ Doncaster Knights	2	(0)
2025-	Doncaster Knights	16	(10)
Super Rugby
Years	Team	Apps	(Points)
2022–23	Southern Knights		

Aidan Cross (born 14 November 2001) is a Scottish rugby union player who plays for Doncaster Knights at the Wing position. He previously played for the Southern Knights in the Super 6 competition.

== Rugby Union career ==
=== Amateur career ===
Cross played rugby for the Stewarts Melville College before playing for Stewarts Melville RFC. He won the Under-18 Scottish Schools final in 2019 playing for Stewarts Melville College against George Watson's College 24 - 19.

He played for Melrose in the 2019-20 season and the following season. He played in their 7s side at the Edinburgh City Sevens.

=== Professional career ===
He played for Glasgow Warriors in 2022 in a back-up game against Edinburgh Rugby.

He played for Southern Knights in the Super 6 tournament in 2022 and 2023.

In 2023, he had a trial with Exeter Chiefs.

He was then picked up in Edinburgh Rugby's training group in 2024.

He joined the Glasgow Warriors academy structure in the summer of 2024.

He was loaned out to Doncaster Knights in January 2025 in a short term loan deal. He made an immediate impact from the bench in his first match against Newcastle Falcons, setting up a try; and started the match afterwards against Sale Sharks.

He will join Doncaster on a permanent basis for season 2025-26.

== Outside of rugby ==
Cross has a degree in Latin from the University of Edinburgh.
