= 2022 Scotland rugby union tour of Argentina =

- Date: 2–16 July 2022
- Coach: Gregor Townsend
- Tour captain(s): Grant Gilchrist (Note: Gilchrist was the captain for the first two tests, before significant changes to the squad, prior to the third test, left him out of the team. Subsequently Watson was announced as the captain for the third test.); Hamish Watson
- Top point scorer: Emiliano Boffelli (30 points)
- Top try scorer: Five players (2 tries) (Note: Does not include points scored in the Scotland A test: Mark Bennett; Santiago Carreras; Duhan van der Merwe; Ewan Ashman; Gonzalo Bertranou)
- Top test point scorer: Blair Kinghorn (24 points) (Note: Does not include points scored in the Scotland A test.)
- Top test try scorer: Three players (2 tries) (Note: Mark Bennett; Duhan van der Merwe; Ewan Ashman)
Summary
P	W	D	L
Total
4	2	0	2
Test match
3	1	0	2
Opponent
P	W	D	L
Argentina
3	1	0	2

Tour chronology
- ← Argentina, Canada and United States 2018 Canada, Chile, United States and Uruguay 2024 →

In July 2022 the Scotland rugby union team toured Argentina. It was the first time since 2010 that Scotland returned to tour Argentina, and the first time since 2018 the two teams had met. Before the series had begun both teams were equal on a head-to-head record of 9–9. However Scotland had a current five game win-streak over Argentina, the most Scotland had accrued over them in their eighteen meetings. Moreover, Argentina had not beaten Scotland since their meeting in the 2011 Rugby World Cup in New Zealand.

Furthermore, on the World Rugby Rankings Scotland sat seventh and Argentina eighth, respectively. As Argentina had the "home advantage" they would sit above Scotland when calculating the point distribution depending on the result.

Argentina's series win is the first time they had won a home test-series since beating Ireland 2–0 in 2007. It was also Argentina's first series win over Scotland since their first series in 1994 (2–0).

The Scotland captain for the first two matches was Grant Gilchrist. The squad was significantly changed before the third test, leading to Hamish Watson taking over the captaincy for the last match.

== Fixtures ==
Date and time		Venue	Home	Score	Away
25 June 2022	16:00 CLT (UTC−4)	Estadio Santa Laura, Santiago	Chile	5–45	Scotland A
2 July 2022	16:10 ART (UTC−3)	Estadio 23 de Agosto, San Salvador de Jujuy	Argentina	26–18	Scotland
9 July 2022	16:10 ART (UTC−3)	Estadio Padre Ernesto Martearena, Salta	Argentina	6–29	Scotland
16 July 2022	16:10 ART (UTC−3)	Estadio Único Madre de Ciudades, Santiago del Estero	Argentina	34–31	Scotland

== Matches ==
=== Scotland A test ===
25 June 2022
16:00 CLT (UTC−04)

Chile	5–45	Scotland A
Try: Edwards 78' m	Report	Try: Hoyland (3) 12' c, 28' c, 45' m Horne (2) 17' c, 22' c McLean 79' m Price 80' c Con: Thompson (4/5) 13', 17', 24', 29'; Kinghorn (1/2) 80+2'

Estadio Santa Laura-Universidad SEK, Santiago
Attendance: 8,213
Referee: Adam Jones (Wales)

Team details

FB	15	Francisco Urroz
RW	14	Nicolas Garafulic
OC	13	Pablo Casas
IC	12	Iñaki Ayarza	(substituted off) 48'
LW	11	Matías Garafulic
FH	10	Rodrigo Fernández (c)
SH	9	Marcelo Torrealba	(substituted off) 54'
N8	8	Alfonso Escobar	(substituted off) 48'
OF	7	Ignacio Silva	(substituted off) 40'
BF	6	Santiago Edwards
RL	5	Clemente Saavedra	(substituted off) 11'
LL	4	Santiago Pedrero
TP	3	Vittorio Lastra	(substituted off) 59'
HK	2	Tomás Dussaillant	(substituted off) 25'
LP	1	Javier Carrasco	(substituted off) 40'
Replacements:
HK	16	Diego Escobar	(substituted in) 25'
PR	17	Salvador Lues	(substituted in) 40'
PR	18	Iñaki Gurruchaga	(substituted in) 59'
LK	19	Thomas Orchard	(substituted in) 11'
FL	20	Raimundo Martínez	(substituted in) 40'
SH	21	José Larenas	(substituted in) 48'
FH	22	Santiago Videla	(substituted in) 48'
CE	23	Nicolás Herreros	(substituted in) 54'
Coach:
(Uruguay) Pablo Lemoine

FB	15	Ollie Smith
RW	14	Damien Hoyland
OC	13	Matt Currie	(substituted off) 68'
IC	12	Sione Tuipulotu
LW	11	Rufus McLean
FH	10	Ross Thompson	(substituted off) 68'
SH	9	George Horne	(substituted off) 68'
N8	8	Matt Fagerson	(substituted off) 54'
OF	7	Luke Crosbie (c)
BF	6	Ben Muncaster
RL	5	Scott Cummings	(substituted off) 54'
LL	4	Jamie Hodgson
TP	3	Javan Sebastian	(substituted off) 58'
HK	2	Dave Cherry	(substituted off) 54'
LP	1	Jamie Bhatti	(substituted off) 68'
Replacements:
HK	16	Johnny Matthews	(substituted in) 54'
PR	17	Pierre Schoeman	(substituted in) 68'
PR	18	Murphy Walker	(substituted in) 58'
LK	19	Glen Young	(substituted in) 54'
FL	20	Magnus Bradbury	(substituted in) 54'
SH	21	Ali Price	(substituted in) 68'
FH	22	Blair Kinghorn	(substituted in) 68'
CE	23	Mark Bennett	(substituted in) 68'
Coach:
(Scotland) Gregor Townsend

Assistant referees:
Francisco Gonzalez (Uruguay)
Talal Chaudhry (Canada)
Television match official:
Lucas Galan (Argentina)

Notes:

- Despite not being a full capped test-match, this was the first time these two teams have played each other.
- This is the first time that Chile has hosted a Tier 1 nation (outside of any competition) since hosting a France XV side in 2005.

=== First test ===
2 July 2022
16:10 ART (UTC−03)

Argentina	26–18	Scotland
Try: de la Fuente 30' m Carreras 35' c Bertranou 57' m Con: Boffelli (1/3) 36'; Pen: Sánchez (2/2) 4', 18'; Boffelli (1/2) 71'	Report	Try: Bennett 49' m Hutchinson 54' c Con: Kinghorn (1/2) 56'; Pen: Kinghorn (2/2) 16', 26'

Estadio 23 de Agosto, San Salvador de Jujuy
Attendance: 21,630
Referee: Nic Berry (Australia)

Team details

FB	15	Juan Cruz Mallía
RW	14	Santiago Cordero
OC	13	Matías Orlando	(substituted off) 66'
IC	12	Jerónimo de la Fuente	(substituted off) 57'
LW	11	Emiliano Boffelli
FH	10	Nicolás Sánchez	(substituted off) 21'
SH	9	Gonzalo Bertranou
N8	8	Pablo Matera
BF	7	Marcos Kremer	(substituted off) 60'
OF	6	Juan Martín González
RL	5	Matias Alemanno	(substituted off) 73'
LL	4	Guido Petti
TP	3	Francisco Gomez Kodela	(substituted off) 57'
HK	2	Julián Montoya (c)	(substituted off) 60'
LP	1	Nahuel Tetaz Chaparro	(substituted off) 57'
Replacements:
HK	16	Agustin Creevy	(substituted in) 60'
PR	17	Mayco Vivas	(substituted in) 57'
PR	18	Joel Sclavi	(substituted in) 57'
LK	19	Lucas Paulos	(substituted in) 73'
N8	20	Facundo Isa	(substituted in) 60'
WG	21	Juan Imhoff	(substituted in) 66'
FH	22	Santiago Carreras	(substituted in) 21'
CE	23	Matías Moroni	(substituted in) 57'
Coach:
(Australia) Michael Cheika

FB	15	Rory Hutchinson
RW	14	Darcy Graham
OC	13	Mark Bennett
IC	12	Sam Johnson
LW	11	Duhan van der Merwe
FH	10	Blair Kinghorn	(substituted off) 61'
SH	9	Ali Price	(substituted off) 68'
N8	8	Matt Fagerson
BF	7	Luke Crosbie	(substituted off) 54'
OF	6	Magnus Bradbury
RL	5	Jonny Gray	(substituted off) 68'
LL	4	Grant Gilchrist (c)
TP	3	Zander Fagerson	(substituted off) 61'
HK	2	George Turner	(substituted off) 61'
LP	1	Pierre Schoeman	(substituted off) 61'
Replacements:
HK	16	Ewan Ashman	(substituted in) 61'
PR	17	Rory Sutherland	(substituted in) 61'
PR	18	Javan Sebastian	(substituted in) 61'
LK	19	Sam Skinner	(substituted in) 68'
FL	20	Rory Darge	(substituted in) 54'
SH	21	Ben White	(substituted in) 68'
FH	22	Ross Thompson
CE	23	Sione Tuipulotu	(substituted in) 61'
Coach:
(Scotland) Gregor Townsend

Assistant referees:
Mathieu Raynal (France)
Pierre Brousset (France)
Television match official:
Marius Jonker (South Africa)

Notes:

- Tomás Cubelli (Argentina) had been named to start but withdrew ahead of the game and was replaced by Gonzalo Bertranou, who was replaced by Juan Imhoff on the bench.
- Joel Sclavi (Argentina) made his international debut.
- This was Argentina's first home game since they played South Africa in August 2019, nearly three years ago (1,057 days since their last home game)

=== Second test ===
9 July 2022
16:10 ART (UTC−03)

Argentina	6–29	Scotland
Pen: Boffelli (2/2) 6', 34'	Report	Try: Watson 37' m Bennett 43' c M. Fagerson 53' c Johnson 64' c Con: Kinghorn (1/2) 44'; Thompson (2/2) 54', 65'; Pen: Kinghorn (1/1) 4'

Estadio Padre Ernesto Martearena, Salta
Attendance: 20,900
Referee: Mathieu Raynal (France)

Team details

FB	15	Emiliano Boffelli	(yellow card) 51' to 61'
RW	14	Santiago Cordero
OC	13	Matías Orlando
IC	12	Jerónimo de la Fuente		(substituted off) 68'
LW	11	Juan Imhoff		(substituted off) 75'
FH	10	Santiago Carreras
SH	9	Gonzalo Bertranou		(substituted off) 71'
N8	8	Rodrigo Bruni		(substituted off) 46'
BF	7	Marcos Kremer
OF	6	Juan Martín González
RL	5	Matias Alemanno		(substituted off) 67'
LL	4	Guido Petti
TP	3	Francisco Gomez Kodela		(substituted off) 54'
HK	2	Julián Montoya (c)		(substituted off) 54'
LP	1	Nahuel Tetaz Chaparro		(substituted off) 49'
Replacements:
HK	16	Agustin Creevy		(substituted in) 54'
PR	17	Mayco Vivas		(substituted in) 49'
PR	18	Joel Sclavi		(substituted in) 54'
LK	19	Lucas Paulos		(substituted in) 67'
N8	20	Facundo Isa		(substituted in) 46'
SH	21	Felipe Ezcurra		(substituted in) 71'
FH	22	Domingo Miotti		(substituted in) 75'
CE	23	Matías Moroni		(substituted in) 68'
Coach:
(Australia) Michael Cheika

FB	15	Rory Hutchinson	(substituted off) 38'
RW	14	Darcy Graham
OC	13	Mark Bennett
IC	12	Sam Johnson
LW	11	Duhan van der Merwe
FH	10	Blair Kinghorn
SH	9	Ben White	(substituted off) 53'
N8	8	Matt Fagerson
BF	7	Hamish Watson	(substituted off) 69'
OF	6	Rory Darge
RL	5	Grant Gilchrist (c)	(substituted off) 64'
LL	4	Sam Skinner
TP	3	Zander Fagerson	(substituted off) 64'
HK	2	Dave Cherry	(substituted off) 58'
LP	1	Pierre Schoeman	(substituted off) 64'
Replacements:
HK	16	George Turner	(substituted in) 58'
PR	17	Jamie Bhatti	(substituted in) 64'
PR	18	Javan Sebastian	(substituted in) 64'
LK	19	Scott Cummings	(substituted in) 64'
FL	20	Andy Christie	(substituted in) 69'
SH	21	Ali Price	(substituted in) 53'
FH	22	Ross Thompson		(substituted in) 49'
WG	23	Kyle Rowe	(substituted in) 38'	(substituted off) 49'
Coach:
(Scotland) Gregor Townsend

Assistant referees:
Ben O'Keeffe (New Zealand)
Pierre Brousset (France)
Television match official:
Brian MacNeice (Ireland)

Notes:

- Hamish Watson (Scotland) earned his 50th test cap.
- Kyle Rowe (Scotland) made his international debut.

=== Third test ===
16 July 2022
16:10 ART (UTC−03)

Argentina	34–31	Scotland
Try: Carreras 20' c Chaparro 51' c Bertranou 67' c Boffelli 80+1' c Con: Boffelli (4/4) 21', 53', 68', 80+2'; Pen: Boffelli (2/3) 11', 35'	Report	Try: van der Merwe (2) 13' c, 48' c Ashman (2) 25' c, 43' c Con: Kinghorn (4/4) 14', 27', 45', 49'); Pen: Kinghorn (1/2) 65'

Estadio Único Madre de Ciudades, Santiago del Estero
Attendance: 30,000
Referee: Ben O'Keeffe (New Zealand)

Team details

FB	15	Juan Cruz Mallía
RW	14	Bautista Delguy	(substituted off) 49'
OC	13	Matías Orlando
IC	12	Matías Moroni
LW	11	Emiliano Boffelli
FH	10	Santiago Carreras
SH	9	Lautaro Bazán	(substituted off) 62'
N8	8	Facundo Isa	(substituted off) 68'
BF	7	Santiago Grondona
OF	6	Pablo Matera (c)
RL	5	Tomás Lavanini	(substituted off) 49'
LL	4	Guido Petti
TP	3	Joel Sclavi	(substituted off) 50'
HK	2	Agustin Creevy	(substituted off) 59'
LP	1	Thomas Gallo	(substituted off) 50'
Replacements:
HK	16	Ignacio Ruiz	(substituted in) 59'
PR	17	Nahuel Tetaz Chaparro	(substituted in) 50'
PR	18	Francisco Gómez Kodela	(substituted in) 50'
FL	19	Marcos Kremer	(substituted in) 49'
FL	20	Juan Martín González	(substituted in) 68'
SH	21	Gonzalo Bertranou	(substituted in) 62'
FH	22	Tomás Albornoz
CE	23	Lucio Cinti	(substituted in) 49'
Coach:
(Australia) Michael Cheika

FB	15	Ollie Smith	(substituted off) 75'
RW	14	Rufus McLean
OC	13	Mark Bennett
IC	12	Sione Tuipulotu
LW	11	Duhan van der Merwe
FH	10	Blair Kinghorn
SH	9	Ali Price
N8	8	Matt Fagerson
BF	7	Hamish Watson (c)	(substituted off) 74'
OF	6	Rory Darge
RL	5	Jonny Gray
LL	4	Scott Cummings	(substituted off) 69'
TP	3	Zander Fagerson
HK	2	Ewan Ashman	(substituted off) 53'
LP	1	Rory Sutherland	(substituted off) 53'
Replacements:
HK	16	Dave Cherry	(substituted in) 53'
PR	17	Pierre Schoeman	(substituted in) 53'
PR	18	Javan Sebastian
LK	19	Glen Young	(substituted in) 69'
FL	20	Andy Christie	(substituted in) 74'
SH	21	George Horne
FH	22	Ross Thompson	(substituted in) 75'
CE	23	Sam Johnson
Coach:
(Scotland) Gregor Townsend

Assistant referees:
Mathieu Raynal (France)
Tual Trainini (France)
Television match official:
Brian MacNeice (Ireland)

Notes:

- Lautaro Bazán and Ignacio Ruiz (Argentina) and Ollie Smith and Glen Young (Scotland) made their international debuts.
- Matías Orlando (Argentina) and Zander Fagerson (Scotland) earned their 50th test caps.

== Squads ==
=== Scotland ===
On 8 June, Scotland named a 40-man squad for their Summer tour to South America with an 'A' fixture against Chile and a three-test series against Argentina. On 17 June, Adam Hastings and Huw Jones withdrew from the squad due to injury and Johnny Matthews joined the squad. On 29 June five players left the squad following their first fixture with the Scotland A side: Matt Currie, Jamie Hodgson, Damien Hoyland, Johnny Matthews and Ben Muncaster.

Coaching team:

- Head coach: Gregor Townsend

Player	Position	Date of birth (age)	Caps	Club/province
Ewan Ashman	Hooker	3 April 2000 (aged 22)	2	(England) Sale Sharks
Dave Cherry	Hooker	3 January 1991 (aged 31)	5	(Scotland) Edinburgh
George Turner	Hooker	8 October 1992 (aged 29)	25	(Scotland) Glasgow Warriors
Jamie Bhatti	Prop	8 September 1993 (aged 28)	22	(Scotland) Glasgow Warriors
Zander Fagerson	Prop	19 January 1996 (aged 26)	47	(Scotland) Glasgow Warriors
Pierre Schoeman	Prop	7 May 1994 (aged 28)	9	(Scotland) Edinburgh
Javan Sebastian	Prop	27 September 1994 (aged 27)	1	(Wales) Scarlets
Rory Sutherland	Prop	24 August 1992 (aged 29)	18	(England) Worcester Warriors
Murphy Walker	Prop	25 October 1999 (aged 22)	0	(Scotland) Glasgow Warriors
Scott Cummings	Lock	3 December 1996 (aged 25)	21	(Scotland) Glasgow Warriors
Grant Gilchrist (c)	Lock	9 August 1990 (aged 31)	53	(Scotland) Edinburgh
Jonny Gray	Lock	24 March 1994 (aged 28)	67	(England) Exeter Chiefs
Sam Skinner	Lock	31 January 1995 (aged 27)	20	(England) Exeter Chiefs
Glen Young	Lock	4 November 1994 (aged 27)	0	(Scotland) Edinburgh
Magnus Bradbury	Back row	23 August 1995 (aged 26)	18	(Scotland) Edinburgh
Andy Christie	Back row	27 March 1999 (aged 23)	1	(England) Saracens
Luke Crosbie	Back row	22 April 1997 (aged 25)	1	(Scotland) Edinburgh
Rory Darge	Back row	23 February 2000 (aged 22)	4	(Scotland) Glasgow Warriors
Matt Fagerson	Back row	16 July 1998 (aged 23)	21	(Scotland) Glasgow Warriors
Hamish Watson	Back row	15 October 1991 (aged 30)	49	(Scotland) Edinburgh
George Horne	Scrum-half	12 May 1995 (aged 27)	17	(Scotland) Glasgow Warriors
Ali Price	Scrum-half	12 May 1993 (aged 29)	51	(Scotland) Glasgow Warriors
Ben White	Scrum-half	27 May 1998 (aged 24)	4	(England) London Irish
Blair Kinghorn	Fly-half	18 January 1997 (aged 25)	31	(Scotland) Edinburgh
Ross Thompson	Fly-half	10 April 1999 (aged 23)	1	(Scotland) Glasgow Warriors
Mark Bennett	Centre	3 February 1993 (aged 29)	24	(Scotland) Edinburgh
Rory Hutchinson	Centre	29 January 1996 (aged 26)	5	(England) Northampton Saints
Sam Johnson	Centre	19 June 1993 (aged 29)	24	(Scotland) Glasgow Warriors
Sione Tuipulotu	Centre	12 February 1997 (aged 25)	5	(Scotland) Glasgow Warriors
Darcy Graham	Wing	21 June 1997 (aged 25)	27	(Scotland) Edinburgh
Rufus McLean	Wing	2 March 2000 (aged 22)	2	(Scotland) Glasgow Warriors
Kyle Rowe	Wing	8 February 1998 (aged 24)	0	(England) London Irish
Duhan van der Merwe	Wing	4 June 1995 (aged 27)	16	(England) Worcester Warriors
Ollie Smith	Fullback	7 August 2000 (aged 21)	0	(Scotland) Glasgow Warriors

=== Argentina ===
Head coach: Michael Cheika

Note: Flags indicate national union for the club/province as defined by World Rugby.

Player	Position	Date of birth (age)	Caps	Club/province
Agustin Creevy	Hooker	15 March 1985 (aged 37)	88	(England) London Irish
Julián Montoya (c)	Hooker	29 October 1993 (aged 28)	76	(England) Leicester Tigers
Ignacio Ruiz	Hooker	3 January 2001 (aged 21)	1	(Argentina) Jaguares XV
Thomas Gallo	Prop	30 April 1999 (aged 23)	5	(Italy) Benetton
Francisco Gómez Kodela	Prop	7 July 1985 (aged 36)	22	(France) Lyon
Santiago Medrano	Prop	6 May 1996 (aged 26)	32	(Australia) Western Force
Joel Sclavi	Prop	25 June 1994 (aged 28)	3	(France) La Rochelle
Nahuel Tetaz Chaparro	Prop	11 June 1989 (aged 33)	70	(Italy) Benetton
Mayco Vivas	Prop	2 June 1998 (aged 24)	6	(Argentina) Jaguares XV
Matías Alemanno	Lock	5 December 1991 (aged 30)	64	(England) Gloucester
Marcos Kremer	Lock	30 July 1997 (aged 24)	46	(France) Stade Français
Tomás Lavanini	Lock	22 January 1993 (aged 29)	67	(France) Clermont
Lucas Paulos	Lock	9 January 1998 (aged 24)	6	(France) Brive
Rodrigo Bruni	Back row	3 September 1993 (aged 28)	4	(France) Brive
Juan Martín González	Back row	14 November 2000 (aged 21)	11	(England) London Irish
Santiago Grondona	Back row	25 July 1998 (aged 23)	6	(England) Exeter Chiefs
Facundo Isa	Back row	21 September 1993 (aged 28)	39	(France) Toulon
Pablo Matera	Back row	18 July 1993 (aged 28)	81	(New Zealand) Crusaders
Joaquín Oviedo	Back row	17 July 2001 (aged 20)	0	(France) Perpignan
Lautaro Bazán	Scrum-half	24 February 1996 (aged 26)	1	(Italy) Rovigo Delta
Gonzalo Bertranou	Scrum-half	31 December 1993 (aged 28)	39	(Wales) Dragons
Tomás Cubelli	Scrum-half	12 June 1989 (aged 33)	81	(France) Biarritz
Nicolás Sánchez	Fly-half	26 October 1988 (aged 33)	93	(France) Stade Français
Benjamín Urdapilleta	Fly-half	11 March 1986 (aged 36)	16	(France) Castres
Lucio Cinti	Centre	23 February 2000 (aged 22)	7	(England) London Irish
Jerónimo de la Fuente	Centre	24 February 1991 (aged 31)	66	(France) Perpignan
Lucas Mensa	Centre	24 May 1996 (aged 26)	2	(France) Stade Montois
Matías Moroni	Centre	29 March 1991 (aged 31)	60	(England) Newcastle Falcons
Matías Orlando	Centre	14 November 1991 (aged 30)	44	(England) Newcastle Falcons
Santiago Cordero	Wing	6 December 1993 (aged 28)	46	(France) Bordeaux
Juan Imhoff	Wing	11 March 1988 (aged 34)	39	(France) Racing 92
Juan Cruz Mallia	Wing	11 September 1996 (aged 25)	3	(France) Toulouse
Emiliano Boffelli	Fullback	16 January 1995 (aged 27)	43	(Scotland) Edinburgh
Santiago Carreras	Fullback	30 March 1998 (aged 24)	21	(England) Gloucester

== See also ==
- 2022 mid-year rugby union tests
- History of rugby union matches between Argentina and Scotland
