= History of rugby union matches between Argentina and Scotland =

The national rugby union teams of Scotland and Argentina (Los Pumas) have played since 1969. However, the status of the countries' first three matches—two in 1969 and one in 1973—is ambiguous, as only Argentina awarded Test caps for those encounters. The first match recognised by both sides as a Test took place in 1990.

As of November 2026, they have met 27 times, but only 24 of those matches have been recognised by both sides as Tests. Scotland went 2–1 in the three pre-1990 matches, and crushed Argentina 49–3 in their first mutually recognised Test in 1990. The Pumas then went on a seven-match winning streak, but Scotland have been more successful in recent times, winning five encounters in a row between 2014 and 2018 and winning a two-test tour in 2010.

On 16 November 2025 in Edinburgh, Argentina came back from 21-0 down after 57 minutes to win 24–33, their first win in Scotland since 2009. This is Argentina's largest winning margin to date in Scotland.

== Summary ==
Note: Summary below reflects test results by both teams.

=== Overall ===
Details	Played	Won by Argentina	Won by Scotland	Drawn	Argentina points	Scotland points
In Argentina	12	5	7	0	233	300
In Scotland	10	5	5	0	209	262
Neutral venue	2	2	0	0	32	25
Overall	24	12	12	0	474	587

=== Records ===
Note: Date shown in brackets indicates when the record was or last set.

Record	Argentina	Scotland
Longest winning streak	7 (4 Jun 1994 – 14 Jun 2008)	5 (21 Jun 2014 – 2 Jul 2022)
Largest points for
Home	34 (16 Jul 2022)	52 (19 Nov 2022)
Away	33 (16 Nov 2025)	47 (4 Jul 2026)
Largest winning margin
Home	8 (2 Jul 2022)	46 (10 Nov 1990)
Away	9 (18 Nov 2001 and 16 Nov 2025)	29 (23 Jun 2018)

== Results ==
No.	Date	Venue	City	Score	Winner	Competition
1	10 November 1990	Murrayfield Stadium	Edinburgh	49–3	Scotland	1990 Argentina tour
2	4 June 1994	Ferro Carril Oeste	Buenos Aires	16–15	Argentina	1994 Scotland tour
3	11 June 1994	Ferro Carril Oeste	Buenos Aires	19–17	Argentina	1994 Scotland tour
4	21 August 1999	Murrayfield Stadium	Edinburgh	22–31	Argentina	1999 World Cup warm-up
5	18 November 2001	Murrayfield Stadium	Edinburgh	16–25	Argentina	2001 Autumn International
6	12 November 2005	Murrayfield Stadium	Edinburgh	19–23	Argentina	2005 Autumn International
7	7 October 2007	Stade de France	Saint-Denis (France)	19–13	Argentina	2007 World Cup quarter-finals
8	7 June 2008	Gigante de Arroyito	Rosario	21–15	Argentina	2008 Scotland tour
9	14 June 2008	José Amalfitani	Buenos Aires	14–26	Scotland	2008 Scotland tour
10	28 November 2009	Murrayfield Stadium	Edinburgh	6–9	Argentina	2009 Autumn International
11	12 June 2010	Atlético Tucumán	Tucumán	16–24	Scotland	2010 Scotland tour
12	19 June 2010	José María Minella	Mar del Plata	9–13	Scotland	2010 Scotland tour
13	25 September 2011	Wellington Regional Stadium	Wellington (New Zealand)	13–12	Argentina	2011 World Cup Pool match
14	21 June 2014	Mario Kempes	Córdoba	19–21	Scotland	2014 Summer International
15	8 November 2014	Murrayfield Stadium	Edinburgh	41–31	Scotland	2014 Autumn International
16	19 November 2016	Murrayfield Stadium	Edinburgh	19–16	Scotland	2016 Autumn International
17	23 June 2018	Estadio Centenario	Resistencia	15–44	Scotland	2018 Summer International
18	24 November 2018	Murrayfield Stadium	Edinburgh	14–9	Scotland	2018 Autumn International
19	2 July 2022	Gimnasia y Esgrima	Jujuy	26–18	Argentina	2022 Scotland tour
20	9 July 2022	Padre Martearena	Salta	6–29	Scotland	2022 Scotland tour
21	16 July 2022	Madre de Ciudades	Santiago del Estero	34–31	Argentina	2022 Scotland tour
22	19 November 2022	Murrayfield Stadium	Edinburgh	52–29	Scotland	2022 Argentina tour
23	16 November 2025	Murrayfield Stadium	Edinburgh	24–33	Argentina	2025 Autumn International
24	4 July 2026	Mario Kempes Stadium	Cordoba	38–47	Scotland	2026 Nations Championship

== XV Results ==
Below is a list of matches that Argentina has awarded matches test match status by virtue of awarding caps, but Scotland did not award caps.

No.	Date	Venue	Score	Winner	Competition
1	13 September 1969	Gimnasia y Esgrima, Buenos Aires	20–3	Argentina XV	1969 Scotland tour of Argentina
2	27 September 1969	Gimnasia y Esgrima, Buenos Aires	3–6	Scotland XV	1969 Scotland tour of Argentina
3	24 November 1973	Murrayfield Stadium, Edinburgh	12–11	Scotland XV	1973 Argentina tour of Ireland and Scotland

== List of series ==
Won by Argentina	Won by Scotland	Drawn
2	1	1

Year	Argentina	Scotland	Series winner
1994	2	0	Argentina
2008	1	1	draw
2010	0	2	Scotland
2022	2	1	Argentina
