= Scotland national under-20 rugby union team =

Scotland
- Union: Scottish Rugby Union
- Coach: Kenny Murray
- Captain: Rory Darge
Team kit	Change kit

First international
- Scotland 6–12 France (1 February 2008)

Largest win
- Wales 17–52 Scotland (13 March 2020)

Largest defeat
- Scotland 7–82 Ireland (10 March 2023)

World Cup
- Appearances: 11 (U20 World Championship) (First appearance in 2008)
- Best result: 5th 2017

The Scotland national under-20 rugby union team participates in the World Rugby Under 20 Trophy. Their highest placement is 5th which they achieved in the 2017 World Rugby Under 20 Championship.

The U20 side also compete in the Six Nations Under 20s Championship.

Both tournaments began in 2008 and replaced the Under 19 or Under 21 championships. The World Rugby Under 20 Championship was known as the IRB Junior World Championship up to 2014.

Prior to this, there were U19 and U21 tournaments for the World Rugby Championship. There was also a U21 tournament for the Six Nations from 2004.

The Under 20 side is now the pinnacle of Scottish Rugby's age-grade system.

== Current squad ==
2025 Six Nations Under 20 Championship Squad
Forwards
- Billy Allen – Dungannon RFC
- Ollie Blyth-Lafferty – Edinburgh Rugby
- Freddy Douglas – Edinburgh Rugby
- Oliver Duncan – Edinburgh Rugby
- Oliver Finlayson-Russell – The University of St Andrew’s
- Mark Fyffe – University of Edinburgh
- Bart Godsell – Loughborough University
- Dan Halkon – Glasgow Warriors
- Christian Lindsay – Loretto School/Edinburgh Rugby
- Reuben Logan – Northampton Saints
- Oliver McKenna – Glasgow Warriors
- Charlie Moss – Montpellier
- Will Pearce – Cardiff Metropolitan University/Bristol Bears
- Joe Roberts – Glasgow Warriors
- Jake Shearer – Glasgow Warriors
- Pat Spence – Heriot’s RFC
- Seb Stephen – Edinburgh Academical Football Club
- Jamie Stewart – Edinburgh Rugby
- Ryan Whitefield – Biggar RFC

Backs

- Jack Brown – Edinburgh Rugby
- Isaac Coates – Edinburgh Rugby
- Noah Cowan – Brunel University/Ealing Trailfinders
- Angus Hunter – Heriot’s RFC
- Hamish MacArthur – Edinburgh Rugby
- Nairn Moncrieff – Edinburgh Rugby
- Hector Patterson – Edinburgh Rugby
- Guy Rogers – University of Surrey/Harlequins
- Matthew Urwin – Glasgow Warriors
- Cameron van Wyk – Ayr RFC
- Johnny Ventisei – Captain – Glasgow Warriors
- Fergus Watson – Glasgow Warriors
- Campbell Waugh – Glasgow Hawks
- Ross Wolfenden – Edinburgh Rugby
- Kerr Yule – Glasgow Warriors

== Previous squads ==
=== 2024 ===
2024 Six Nations Under 20 Championship Squad
Forwards
- Callum Smyth (Glasgow Warriors)
- Robbie Deans (Edinburgh Rugby)
- Alex O’Driscoll (Saracens/Loughborough University)
- Ollie Blyth-Lafferty (Edinburgh Rugby)
- Callum Norrie (Glasgow Warriors)
- Jerry Blyth-Lafferty (Edinburgh Rugby)
- Elliot Young (Exeter Chiefs/Exeter University)
- Ryan Burke (Glasgow Warriors)
- Ruaraidh Hart (Glasgow Warriors)
- Euan McVie (Edinburgh Rugby)
- Theo Currie (Harlequins/Swansea University)
- Fraser Wilson (Hawick RFC)
- Freddy Douglas (Edinburgh Rugby)
- Monroe Job (Southern Knights)
- Liam McConnell (Edinburgh Rugby) (CAPTAIN)
- Jonny Morris (Glasgow Warriors)
- Archie Clarke (Durham University)
- Tom Currie (Edinburgh Rugby)

Backs

- Murdoch Lock (Bath/Bath University)
- Eric Davey (Stirling Wolves)
- Hector Patterson (Edinburgh Rugby)
- Isaac Coates (Edinburgh Rugby)
- Andrew McLean (Boroughmuir Bears)
- Matthew Urwin (Glasgow Warriors)
- Kerr Yule (Glasgow Warriors)
- Johnny Ventisei (Glasgow Warriors)
- Geordie Gwynn (Ealing Trailfinders/Brunel University)
- Ludo Kolade (Harlequins/Bath University)
- Kerr Johnston (Glasgow Warriors)
- Jack Hocking (Edinburgh Rugby)
- Fergus Watson (Glasgow Warriors)
- Amena Caqusau (Glasgow Warriors)
- Finn Douglas (Edinburgh Rugby)
- Logan Jarvie (Glasgow Warriors)
- Finlay Doyle (Loughborough University)

2024 World Rugby Under 20 Trophy Squad
Forwards
- Ollie Blyth-Lafferty (Edinburgh Rugby)
- Jerry Blyth-Lafferty (Edinburgh Rugby)
- Ryan Burke (Glasgow Warriors)
- Dylan Cockburn (Southern Knights/Melrose RFC)
- Tom Currie (Edinburgh Rugby)
- Robbie Deans (Edinburgh Rugby)
- Freddy Douglas (Edinburgh Rugby)
- Ruaraidh Hart (Glasgow Warriors)
- Liam McConnell (Edinburgh Rugby)
- Euan McVie (Edinburgh Rugby)
- Jonny Morris (Glasgow Warriors)
- Callum Norrie (Glasgow Warriors)
- Gavin Parry (Watsonians/Pontypridd RFC)
- Jake Shearer (Ayrshire Bulls/Ayr RFC)
- Callum Smyth (Glasgow Warriors)
- Seb Stephen (unattached)

Backs

- Finlay Doyle (Loughborough University)
- Jack Hocking (Edinburgh Rugby)
- Geordie Gwynn (Ealing Trailfinders/Brunel University)
- Ludo Kolade (Harlequins/Bath University)
- Conor McAlpine (Watsonians)
- Andrew McLean (Boroughmuir Bears)
- Hector Patterson (Edinburgh Rugby)
- Findlay Thomson (Watsonians)
- Matthew Urwin (Glasgow Warriors)
- Johnny Ventisei (Glasgow Warriors)
- Fergus Watson (Glasgow Warriors)
- Kerr Yule (Glasgow Warriors)

=== 2023 ===
2023 Six Nations Under 20 Championship Squad
Forwards
- Max Surry (Cardiff Met University)
- Craig Davidson (Watsonians RFC)
- Moby Ogunlaja (Glasgow Hawks)
- Callum Norrie (Stirling Wolves/Glasgow Warriors)
- Robbie Deans (Watsonians/Edinburgh Rugby)
- Eben Cairns (Glasgow Hawks)
- Elliot Young (Exeter Chiefs/Exeter University)
- Corey Tait (Boroughmuir Bears)
- Jerry Blyth-Lafferty (Boroughmuir Bears)
- Harris McLeod (Stirling Wolves/Glasgow Warriors)
- Ruaraidh Hart (Glasgow Hawks)
- Eddie Erskine (Bath Rugby/Bath University)
- Jake Parkinson (Ealing Trailfinders/Brunel University)
- Rudi Brown (Southern Knights/Edinburgh Rugby)
- Sam Derrick (Southern Knights)
- Jonny Morris (GHA RFC)
- Liam McConnell (Boroughmuir Bears/Edinburgh Rugby)
- Ewan Guy (Cardiff Met University)
- Johnny Rutherford (Currie Chieftains)

Backs

- Ben Afshar (Ayrshire Bulls/Glasgow Warriors)
- Finlay Burgess (Stirling Wolves/Glasgow Warriors)
- Charlie Clare (Harlequins/Surrey University)
- Richie Simpson (Ayrshire Bulls)
- Harris Rutherford (Gala RFC)
- Kerr Yule (Glasgow Hawks)
- Duncan Munn (Boroughmuir Bears/Glasgow Warriors)
- Murray Wilson (Gala RFC)
- Geordie Gwynn (Ealing Trailfinders/Brunel University)
- Findlay Thomson (Musselburgh RFC)
- Amena Caqusau (GHA RFC)
- William Robinson (Caldy RFC)
- Logan Jarvie (Stirling Wolves/Glasgow Warriors)
- Dan King (Heriot’s Rugby)
- Ben Evans (Heriot’s Rugby/Edinburgh Rugby)

2023 World Rugby Under 20 Trophy Squad
Forwards
- Jerry Blyth-Lafferty
- Rudi Brown
- Craig Davidson
- Robbie Deans
- Sam Derrick
- Finn Duraj
- Eddie Erskine
- Ruaraidh Hart
- Liam McConnell (co-captain)
- Ollie Minnis
- Jonny Morris
- Callum Norrie
- Jake Parkinson
- Jonny Smith
- Max Surry
- Corey Tait

Backs

- Ben Afshar (co-captain)
- Finlay Burgess
- Finn Douglas
- Geordie Gwynn
- Logan Jarvie
- Dan King
- Andrew McLean
- Hector Patterson
- Matt Reid
- Ben Salmon
- Findlay Thomson
- Kerr Yule

=== 2022 ===
No squads named due to coronavirus pandemic.

=== 2021 ===
2021 Six Nations Under 20 Championship Squad
Forwards
- Jamie Drummond (Ayrshire Bulls)
- Patrick Harrison (Southern Knights/Edinburgh Rugby)
- Duncan Hood (Heriot's Blues)
- Tom Banatvala (Durham University)
- Michael Jones (Boroughmuir Bears)
- Corey Bowker (Leeds Beckett University)
- George Breese (Stirling Wolves)
- Olly Frostick (Ealing Trailfinders)
- Cole Lamberton (Watsonians Rugby/Edinburgh Rugby)
- Alex Samuel (Stirling County/Glasgow Warriors) CAPTAIN
- Max Williamson (Stirling County/Glasgow Warriors)
- Euan Ferrie (Glasgow Hawks)
- Harri Morris (Southern Knights)
- Rhys Tait (Southern Knights)
- Ollie Leatherbarrow (Exeter University)
- Rory Jackson (Ayrshire Bulls/Glasgow Warriors)
- Ben Muncaster (Watsonians Rugby/Edinburgh Rugby)
- Archie Smeaton (Cambridge University)

Backs

- Ethan McVicker (Melrose Rugby)
- Murray Redpath (Newcastle University)
- Cameron Scott (Southern Knights/Edinburgh Rugby)
- Euan Cunningham (Stirling County/Glasgow Warriors)
- Christian Townsend (Ayrshire Bulls)
- Thomas Glendinning (Glasgow Hawks)
- Scott King (Heriot's Rugby/Edinburgh Rugby)
- Michael Gray (Boroughmuir Bears/Glasgow Warriors)
- Elliot Gourlay (Sale Sharks)
- Finlay Callaghan (Ayrshire Bulls/Glasgow Warriors)
- Adam Scott (GHA)
- Ollie Melville (Boroughmuir Bears/Glasgow Warriors)
- Harry Paterson (Heriot's Rugby/Edinburgh Rugby)
- Ross McKnight (Stirling County)

=== 2020 ===
2020 Six Nations Under 20 Championship Squad
Forwards
- Ewan Ashman (Sale Sharks)
- Connor Boyle (Watsonian Rugby)
- George Breese (Stirling Wolves)
- Gregor Brown (Boroughmuir Bears)
- Jamie Campbell (Biggar)
- Dan Gamble (Heriot's Rugby)
- Rory Darge (Southern Knights)
- Cameron Henderson (Stirling County)
- Jack Hill (Durham University)
- Rory Jackson (Ayrshire Bulls)
- Rory Jackson (Watsonians Rugby)
- Thomas Jeffrey (Jed Forest)
- Alex Maxwell (Stourbridge RFC)
- Cairn Ramsay (Currie Chieftains)
- Robbie Simpson (Edinburgh Academicals)
- Archie Smeaton (Cambridge University)

Backs

- Jack Blain (Heriot's Rugby)
- Nathan Chamberlain (Hartpury College/Bristol Bears)
- Matthew Currie (Watsonians Rugby)
- Roan Frostwick (Watsonians Rugby)
- Callum Grieve (Newcastle University)
- Jacob Henry (Southern Knights)
- Scott King (Heriot's Rugby)
- Robbie McCallum (Boroughmuir Bears)
- Kyle McGhie (Boroughmuir Bears)
- Rufus McLean (Boroughmuir Bears)
- Scott Robeson (Heriot's Rugby)
- Cameron Scott (Boroughmuir Bears)
- Ollie Smith (Ayrshire Bulls)

=== 2019 ===
2019 World Rugby Under 20 Championship Squad
Forwards
- Andrew Nimmo (Glasgow Hawks)
- Angus Fraser (Glasgow Hawks)
- Cristen van Niekerk (Lions)
- Cameron Henderson (Stirling County)
- Connor Boyle (Watsonians)
- Ewan Ashman (Sale Sharks)
- Euan McLaren (Ayr)
- Ewan Johnson (Racing 92)
- Jack Mann (Edinburgh Accies)
- Mak Wilson (Melrose)
- Marshall Sykes (Ayr)
- Murphy Walker (Stirling County)
- Ross Bundy (Stirling County)
- Teddy Leatherbarrow (Sale Sharks)
- Tom Marshall (Newcastle Falcons)
- Will Hurd (Cardiff Metropolitan University)

Backs

- Cameron Anderson (Wasps)
- Grant Hughes (Stirling County)
- Jack Blain (Heriot's)
- Lomond McPherson (Watsonians)
- Ollie Smith (Ayr)
- Matt Davidson (London Scottish)
- Murray Scott (Watsonians)
- Nathan Chamberlain (Bristol Bears)
- Roan Frostwick (Currie Chieftains)
- Robbie McCallum (Complutense Cisneros)
- Rory McMichael (Heriot's)
- Ross Thompson (Glasgow Hawks)

2019 Six Nations Under 20 Championship Squad
Forwards
- Andrew Nimmo (Glasgow Hawks)
- Murphy Walker (Stirling County)
- Sam Grahamslaw (Leicester Tigers)
- Will Hurd (Cardiff Metropolitan University)
- Euan McLaren (Ayr)
- Angus Fraser (Glasgow Hawks)
- Ewan Ashman (Sale Sharks)
- Finlay Scott (Jed-Forest)
- Cameron Henderson (Stirling County)
- Charlie Jupp (Heriot's)
- Ewan Johnson (Racing 92)
- Teddy Leatherbarrow (Sale Sharks)
- Connor Boyle (Watsonians)
- Jack Hill (Durham University)
- Jack Mann (Edinburgh Accies)
- Cristen van Niekerk (Lions)
- Ross Bundy (Stirling County)

Backs

- Kyle McGhie (Musselburgh)
- Roan Frostwick (Currie Chieftains)
- Murray Scott (Watsonians)
- Ross Thompson (Glasgow Hawks)
- Nathan Chamberlain (Bristol Bears)
- Andrew Jardine (Melrose)
- Cameron Anderson (Wasps)
- Grant Hughes (Stirling County)
- Robbie McCallum (Complutense Cisneros)
- Ollie Smith (Ayr)*
- Jacob Lineen (Durham University)
- Matt Davidson (London Scottish)
- Jack Blain (Heriot's)*
- Rory McMichael (Heriot's)
- Rufus McLean (Watsonians)

=== 2018 ===
2018 World Rugby Under 20 Championship Squad
Forwards
- Sam Grahamslaw (Leicester Tigers)
- Ross Dunbar (Boroughmuir)
- Finlay Richardson (Edinburgh Accies)
- Murphy Walker (Strathallan School)
- Euan McLaren (Ayr)
- Robbie Smith (Ayr)
- Finlay Scott (Jed-Forest)
- Ewan Johnson (Racing Metro 92)
- Jamie Hodgson (Watsonians)
- Charlie Jupp (Heriot's)
- Marshall Sykes (St Joseph's College)
- Martin Hughes (Heriot's)
- Rory Darge (Melrose)
- Guy Graham (Newcastle Falcons)
- Devante Onojaife (Northampton Saints)
- James Miller (Watsonians)

Backs

- Charlie Chapman (Gloucester)
- Kaleem Barreto (Marr)
- Ross Thompson (Glasgow Hawks)
- Callum McLelland (Edinburgh Rugby)
- Stafford McDowall (Ayr)
- Logan Trotter (Stirling County)
- Cammy Hutchison (Currie)
- Fraser Strachan (Northampton Saints)
- Kyle Rowe (Glasgow Hawks)
- Patrick Anderson (Melrose)
- Sam Yawayawa (Glasgow Hawks)
- Paddy Dewhirst (Ayr)

2018 Six Nations Under 20 Championship Squad
Forwards
- Murphy Walker (Strathallan/Dundee HSFP)
- Shaun Gunn (Edinburgh Accies)
- Nathan McBeth (Golden Lions)
- Finlay Richardson (Edinburgh Accies)
- Finn Hobbis (Watsonians)
- Robbie Smith (Ayr)
- Bradley Clements (Ealing)
- Ewan Johnson (Racing 92)
- Jamie Hodgson (Watsonians)
- Alan Gregory (Northumbria University)
- Harry Butler (Hartpury)
- Dan Marek (Boroughmuir)
- Martin Hughes (Heriot's)
- Archie Erskine (Boroughmuir)
- Guy Graham (Hawick)
- Devante Onojaife (Northampton Saints)

Backs

- Kaleem Barreto (Marr)
- Charlie Chapman (Gloucester)
- Charlie Gowling (Stade Francais)
- Ross Thompson (Glasgow Hawks)
- Callum McLelland (Edinburgh Rugby)
- Logan Trotter (Stirling County)
- Kyle Rowe (Glasgow Hawks)
- Sam Yawayawa (Glasgow Hawks)
- Rory McMichael (Unattached)
- Paddy Dewhirst (Ayr)
- Mark New (Glasgow Hawks)
- Stafford McDowall (Ayr)

=== 2017 ===
2017 World Rugby Under 20 Championship Squad
Forwards
- Hamish Bain (Currie)
- Fergus Bradbury (Stirling County)
- Alex Craig (Gloucester)
- Luke Crosbie (Currie)
- Tom Dodd (Worcester)
- Ross Dunbar (Boroughmuir)
- Archie Erskine (Newcastle Falcons)
- Matt Fagerson (Glasgow Hawks)
- Bruce Flockhart (Glasgow Hawks)
- Thomas Gordon (Currie)
- Callum Hunter-Hill (Stirling County)
- Adam Nicol (Stirling County)
- Fraser Renwick (Hawick)
- Robbie Smith (Ayr)
- George Thornton (Bishop Burton College)
- Dan Winning (Boroughmuir)

Backs

- Patrick Anderson (Melrose)
- Ruaridh Dawson (Newcastle Falcons)
- Connor Eastgate (Wasps)
- Darcy Graham (Hawick)
- Josh Henderson (Glasgow Hawks)
- Robert Kay (Heriot's)
- Blair Kinghorn (Edinburgh Rugby)
- Stafford McDowall (Ayr)
- Ross McCann (Melrose)
- Robbie Nairn (Harlequins)
- Charlie Shiel (Currie)
- Andrew Simmers (Heriot's)

2017 Six Nations Under 20 Championship Squad
Forwards
- Hamish Bain (Currie)
- Fergus Bradbury (Stirling County)
- Alex Craig (Gloucester Academy)
- Luke Crosbie (Currie)
- Tom Dodd (Worcester Academy)
- Matt Fagerson (Glasgow Hawks)
- Bruce Flockhart (Glasgow Hawks)
- Thomas Gordon (Currie)
- Jonny Grant (Stewart's Melville)
- Shaun Gunn (Edinburgh Accies)
- Callum Hunter-Hill (Stirling County)
- Adam Nicol (Stirling County)
- Fraser Renwick (Hawick)
- Jack Samuel (Cardiff Metropolitan University)
- George Thornton (Northumbria University)
- Jamie Ure (Boroughmuir)
- Dan Winning (Boroughmuir)

Backs

- Ruaridh Dawson (Newcastle Academy)
- Paddy Dewhirst (Ayr)
- Connor Eastgate (Wasps Academy)
- Darcy Graham (Hawick)
- Ali Greig (Bristol University)
- Josh Henderson (Glasgow Hawks)
- Cameron Hutchison (Currie)
- Stafford McDowall (Ayr)
- Ross McCann (Melrose)
- Robbie Nairn (Bristol University)
- Craig Pringle (Stirling County)
- Charlie Shiel (Currie)
- Andrew Simmers (Heriot's)

=== 2016 ===
2016 World Rugby Under 20 Championship Squad
Forwards
- Dan Elkington (Melrose)
- Zander Fagerson (Glasgow Warriors)
- Murray McCallum (Heriot's)
- Callum Sheldon (Leeds Beckett University)
- George Thornton (Bishop Burton College)
- Lewis Anderson (Ayr)
- Jake Kerr (Boroughmuir)
- Stephen Ainslie (Currie)
- Scott Cummings (Glasgow Warriors)
- Andrew Davidson (Glasgow Hawks)
- Callum Hunter-Hill (Stirling County)
- Scott Burnside (Boroughmuir)
- Ally Miller (Melrose)
- Jamie Ritchie (Edinburgh Rugby)
- Matt Smith (Glasgow Hawks)
- Lewis Wynne (Stirling County)

Backs

- Hugh Fraser (Heriot's)
- Adam Hastings (Bath Rugby)
- Charlie Shiel (Currie)
- Tom Galbraith (Melrose)
- Rory Hutchinson (Northampton Saints)
- Matt McPhillips (Currie)
- George Taylor (Melrose)
- Darcy Graham (Hawick)
- Cameron Gray (Currie)
- Blair Kinghorn (Edinburgh Rugby)
- Robbie Nairn (Harlequins)
- Ben Robbins (Currie)

2016 Six Nations Under 20 Championship Squad
Forwards
- Stephen Ainslie (Currie)
- Lewis Anderson (Ayr)
- Hamilton Burr (Aberdeen Grammar Rugby)
- Sebastian Cecil (Nottingham University)
- Ben Christie (Loughborough)
- Luke Crosbie (Currie)
- Scott Cummings (Glasgow Hawks)
- Andrew Davidson (Glasgow Hawks)
- Matt Emmison (Aberdeenshire)
- Bruce Flockhart (Glasgow Hawks)
- Callum Hunter-Hill (Stirling County)
- Murray McCallum (Heriot's)
- Ally Miller (Melrose)
- Adam Nicol (Stirling County)
- Gary Robertson (Gala)
- Callum Sheldon (University of Leeds)
- Matt Smith (Glasgow Hawks)

Backs

- Reiss Cullen (Watsonians)
- Hugh Fraser (Heriot's)
- Tom Galbraith (Melrose)
- Darcy Graham (Hawick)
- Adam Hastings (Bath Rugby)
- Rory Hutchinson (Northampton Saints)
- Chris Lines (Boroughmuir)
- Ross McCann (Stewart's Melville)
- Matt McPhillips (Currie)
- Robbie Nairn (Harlequins)
- Ben Robbins (Currie)
- Charlie Shiel (Currie)
- George Taylor (Melrose)

=== 2015 ===
2015 World Rugby Under 20 Championship Squad
Forwards
- Magnus Bradbury (Edinburgh Rugby/Boroughmuir)
- Lewis Carmichael (Melrose)
- Scott Cummings (Glasgow Warriors/Glasgow Hawks)
- Andrew Davidson (Glasgow Warriors/Glasgow Hawks)
- Dan Elkington (Watsonians)
- Zander Fagerson (Glasgow Warriors/Glasgow Hawks)
- Ross Graham (Hawick)
- Neil Irvine-Hess (Melrose)
- Sam James (Wasps)
- Ruaridh Knott (Melrose)
- Murray McCallum (Aberdeen Grammar Rugby)
- Ally Miller (Edinburgh Rugby/Watsonians)
- Jamie Ritchie (Edinburgh Rugby)
- Jack Owlett (Exeter Chiefs/University of Exeter)
- Callum Sheldon (Edinburgh Rugby/Watsonians)
- Lewis Wynne (Stirling County)

Backs

- Alec Coombes (London Scottish)
- Tom Galbraith (Melrose)
- Richard Galloway (University of Birmingham)
- George Horne (Glasgow Hawks)
- Ruairi Howarth (Edinburgh Rugby/Gala)
- Rory Hutchinson (Northampton Saints)
- Patrick Kelly (Le Parc)
- Blair Kinghorn (Edinburgh Academy)
- Robbie Nairn (George Watson's College/Currie)
- Archie Russell (Stirling County)
- Ruaraidh Smith (Currie)
- Ben Vellacott (Gloucester/Hartpury College)

2015 Six Nations Under 20 Championship Squad
Forwards
- Magnus Bradbury (Edinburgh Rugby/Boroughmuir)
- Lewis Carmichael (Melrose)
- Scott Cummings (Glasgow Warriors/Glasgow Hawks)
- Andrew Davidson (Glasgow Warriors/Glasgow Hawks)
- Dan Elkington (Watsonians)
- Zander Fagerson (Glasgow Warriors/Glasgow Hawks)
- Cameron Fenton (Glasgow Warriors/Stirling County)
- Ross Graham (Hawick)
- Neil Irvine-Hess (Melrose)
- Murray McCallum (Aberdeen Grammar Rugby/Aberdeen University)
- Ally Miller (Edinburgh Rugby/Watsonians)
- Jack Owlett (Exeter Chiefs/University of Exeter)
- Jamie Ritchie (Edinburgh Rugby)
- Gary Robertson (Gala)
- Callum Sheldon (Edinburgh Rugby/Watsonians)
- Lewis Wynne (Stirling County)

Backs

- Alec Coombes (London Scottish)
- Tom Galbraith (Melrose)
- Richard Galloway (University of Birmingham)
- George Horne (Glasgow Hawks)
- Ruairi Howarth (Edinburgh Rugby/Gala)
- Rory Hutchinson (Northampton Saints)
- Patrick Kelly (Le Parc)
- Blair Kinghorn (Edinburgh Academy/Edinburgh Academicals FC)
- Robbie Nairn (George Watson's College/Currie)
- Archie Russell (Stirling County)
- Ruaraidh Smith (Currie)
- Ben Vellacott (Gloucester/Hartpury College)

=== 2014 ===
2014 IRB Junior World Championship Squad
Forwards
- Magnus Bradbury (Boroughmuir/Edinburgh Rugby)
- Lewis Carmichael (Melrose)
- Gabriel Carroll (Loughborough University)
- Jack Cosgrove (Worcester Warriors)
- Andrew Cramond (Aberdeen Grammar)
- Philip Cringle (Edinburgh Accies/Edinburgh Rugby)
- Zander Fagerson (Glasgow Hawks)
- Cameron Fenton (Strathallan School/Howe of Fife)
- Neil Irvine-Hess (Edinburgh Rugby)
- Sam James (London Wasps)
- James Malcolm (Ayr)
- Gavin Parker (Exeter University)
- D'Arcy Rae (Ayr/Glasgow Warriors)
- Jamie Ritchie (Howe of Fife)
- Tommy Spinks (London Scottish) (captain)
- Glen Young (Newcastle Falcons).

Backs

- Ben Chalmers (Melrose)
- Chris Dean (Edinburgh Accies/Scotland 7s)
- Jamie Farndale (Edinburgh Accies/Edinburgh Rugby)
- Alex Glashan (Edinburgh Accies/Scotland 7s)
- Neil Herron (Glasgow Hawks/Scotland 7s)
- Damien Hoyland (Melrose)
- Blair Hutchinson (Loughborough University/Melrose)
- Rory Hutchinson (Northampton Saints)
- Gavin Lowe (Glasgow Hawks/Glasgow Warriors)
- Sam Pecqueur (Edinburgh Accies)
- Ben Vellacott (Hartpury/Gloucester)
- Ruairidh Young (Edinburgh Accies)

2014 Six Nations Under 20 Championship Squad
Forwards
- Magnus Bradbury (Boroughmuir/Edinburgh Rugby)
- Lewis Carmichael (Melrose)
- Jack Cosgrove (Worcester Warriors)
- Andrew Cramond (Aberdeen Grammar)
- Philip Cringle (Edinburgh Accies/Edinburgh Rugby)
- Cameron Fenton (Strathallen/Howe of Fife)
- Ross Graham (Hawick)
- Neil Irvine-Hess (Watsonians/Edinburgh Rugby)
- Sam James (London Wasps)
- James Malcolm (Ayr)
- D'Arcy Rae (Ayr/Glasgow Warriors)
- Buchan Richardson (London Scottish)
- Tommy Spinks (London Scottish)
- Glen Young (Newcastle Falcons)

Backs

- Ben Chalmers (Melrose)
- Ben Cooper (Boroughmuir)
- Jamie Farndale (Edinburgh Accies/Edinburgh Rugby)
- Neil Herron (Glasgow Hawks/Scotland 7s)
- Damien Hoyland (Melrose)
- Blair Hutchison (Loughborough University/Melrose)
- Cameron Jeffery (Bristol University)
- Gavin Lowe (Glasgow Hawks/Glasgow Warriors)
- Murdo McAndrew (Clermont Auvergne)
- Sam Pecqueur (Edinburgh Accies)
- Ben Vellacott (Worcester Warriors/Hartpury)
- Ruairidh Young (Edinburgh Accies)

=== 2013 ===
2013 IRB Junior World Championship Squad
Forwards
- Jamie Bhatti (Stirling County)
- Shawn Muir (Hawick)
- Phil Cringle (Edinburgh Rugby/Stewart's-Melville FP)
- Russell Anderson (Gala)
- Callum Black (Edinburgh Accies)
- Reyner Kennedy (Stirling County)
- D'Arcy Rae (Ayr)
- Robbie Wilson (Boroughmuir)
- Ruairidh Leishman (Stirling County)
- Jonny Gray (Glasgow Warriors/Currie)
- Adam Sinclair (Perpignan)
- Alex Henderson (Boroughmuir)
- Adam Ashe (Glasgow Warriors/Stirling County)
- Tommy Spinks (London Scottish)
- Will Bordill (Sale Sharks)
- Andy Cramond (Aberdeen Grammar).

Backs

- Ruairidh Young (Edinburgh Accies)
- Rory Hughes (Scotland 7s/Stirling County)
- Damien Hoyland (Boroughmuir)
- Jamie Farndale (Edinburgh Rugby/Edinburgh Accies)
- J J Kilmartin (Bath Rugby)
- Mark Bennett (Glasgow Warriors/Stirling County)
- Robbie Fergusson (Ayr)
- Chris Auld (Gala)
- Tommy Allan (Perpignan)
- Alex Hagart (Aberdeen Grammar Rugby)
- Ali Price (Bedford Blues)
- Scott Steele (Leicester Tigers).

2013 Six Nations Under 20 Championship Squad
Forwards
- Russell Anderson (Gala)
- Adam Ashe (Glasgow Warriors/Stirling County)
- Christopher Barnes (Glasgow Hawks)
- Jamie Bhatti (Stirling County)
- Calum Black (Edinburgh Accies)
- Will Bordill (Sale Sharks)
- Phil Cringle (Edinburgh Rugby/Stewart's-Melville FP)
- Jonny Gray (Glasgow Warriors/Currie)
- Alex Henderson (Boroughmuir)
- Ruaridh Leishman (Stirling County)
- James Malcolm (GHA)
- Shawn Muir (Hawick)
- D'arcy Rae (Ayr/Whitecraigs)
- Adam Sinclair (Perpignan)
- Tommy Spinks (London Scottish)
- Cameron Turner (Aberdeen Grammar)
- Aaron Welsh (Edinburgh Accies)

Backs

- Tommy Allan (Western Province)
- Chris Auld (Gala)
- Mark Bennett (Clermont Auvergne/Glasgow Warriors)
- Keith Buchan (Boroughmuir)
- Ben Cooper (Leeds Carnegie)
- Robbie Fergusson (Ayr)
- Sam Hidalgo-Clyne (Edinburgh Rugby/Heriot's)
- Damien Hoyland (Boroughmuir)
- JJ Kilmartin (Bath Rugby)
- Gavin Lowe (Ayr)
- Murdo McAndrew (Clermont Auvergne)
- Sam Pecquer (Edinburgh Accies)
- Ali Price (Bedford Blues)
- Peter Stewart (Australia Club (DEC))
- Ruaridh Young (Edinburgh Accies).

=== 2012 ===
2012 IRB Junior World Championship Squad
Forwards
- Fergus Scott (Loughborough University)
- George Turner (Stirling County)
- Alex Allan (Heriot's)
- Jamie Bhatti (Boroughmuir)
- Struan Cessford (Dundee HSFP)
- Robin Hislop (Langholm)
- Gavin Robertson (Stewart's Melville)
- Andy Redmayne (Dundee HSFP)
- Adam Sinclair (Stirling County)
- Stuart Smith (Aberdeen GSFP)
- Will Bordill (Sale Sharks)
- Mitch Eadie (Bristol)
- Gary Graham (Gala)
- Alex Henderson (Boroughmuir)
- Andrew Nagle (Jed-Forest)
- Callum Reid (Edinburgh Academicals)
- Jamie Swanson (Boroughmuir)

Backs

- Murray McConnell (Ayr)
- Matt Torrance (Glenwood High School)
- Harry Leonard (Boroughmuir)
- Tommy Allan (Western Province)
- Mark Bennett (Clermont)
- Robbie Fergusson (Ayr)
- Finn Russell (Falkirk)
- Mikey Crawley (Stewart’s Melville College)
- Jamie Farndale (Edinburgh Academicals)
- Sam Hidalgo-Clyne (Heriot's)
- Tom Steven (Glasgow Hawks)
- Keith Buchan (Boroughmuir)

2012 Six Nations Under 20 Championship Squad
Forwards
- Alex Allan (Loughborough Students)
- Russell Anderson (Gala)
- Adam Ashe (Stirling County)
- Jamie Bhatti (Stirling County)
- Will Bordill (Sale Sharks)
- Struan Cessford (Heriot's)
- Mitch Eadie (Bristol Rugby)
- Jonny Gray (Hamilton)
- Alex Henderson (Boroughmuir)
- Robin Hislop (Edinburgh Rugby)
- Andrew Nagle (Jedforest)
- Andrew Redmayne (Dundee HSFP)
- Callum Reid (Edinburgh Accies)
- Gavin Robertson (Dundee HSFP)
- Fergus Scott (Currie)
- Adam Sinclair (Stirling County)
- Stuart Smith (Aberdeen Grammar)
- Tom Steven (Glasgow Hawks)
- Jamie Swanson (Boroughmuir)
- Callum Templeton (Ayr)
- George Turner (Stewart's Melville)

Backs

- Tommaso Allan (Western Province)
- Chris Auld (Gala)
- Mark Bennett (Clermont Auvergne)
- Jack Bradford (Nottingham Rugby)
- Michael Crawley (Boroughmuir)
- Jamie Farndale (Edinburgh Accies)
- Robbie Fergusson (Ayr)
- Gary Graham (Gala)
- Sam Hidalgo-Clyne (Heriot's)
- Rory Hughes (Glasgow Hawks)
- Harris Jones (Boroughmuir)
- Harry Leonard (Edinburgh Rugby)
- Murray McConnell (Glasgow Warriors)
- Ali Price (Bedford Blues)
- Finn Russell (Falkirk)
- Jack Steele (Dundee HSFP)
- Scott Steele (Leicester Tigers)
- Jamie Stevenson (London Scottish)
- Peter Stewart (Nudgee College Schoolboys)

=== 2011 ===
2011 IRB Junior World Championship Squad
Forwards
- Alex Allan (Loughborough University)
- Dave Cherry (Team Northumbria)
- Mitch Eadie (Filton College)
- Richard Ferguson (Melrose)
- Robin Hislop (Edinburgh/Boroughmuir)
- George Hunter (Glasgow Warriors/Glasgow Hawks)
- Robert McAlpine (West of Scotland)
- Colin Phillips (Edinburgh/Stewart's Melville)
- Grant Runciman (Melrose)
- Alex Spence (Heriot's)
- Jamie Swanson (Boroughmuir)
- Mitchell Todd (Nottingham)
- James Tyas (Bath)
- Hamish Watson (Leicester Tigers)

Backs

- Sam Atkin (Edinburgh Accies)
- Mark Bennett (Glasgow Warriors/Ayr)
- Glenn Bryce (Heriot's)
- Michael Doneghan (Glasgow Warriors/Stirling County)
- Danny Gilmour (Stirling County)
- Stuart Edwards (Stirling County)
- Kerr Gossman (Glasgow Warriors/Glasgow Hawks)
- Stuart Hogg (Glasgow Warriors/Hawick)
- Craig Jackson (Melrose)
- Sean Kennedy (Stirling County)
- Jamie Stevenson (Westcombe Park)
- Duncan Weir (Glasgow Warriors).

2011 Six Nations Under 20 Championship Squad
Forwards
- Alex Allan (Loughborough University)
- Dave Cherry (Team Northumbria)
- Mitch Eadie (Filton College)
- Richard Ferguson (Melrose)
- Duncan Finnie (Watsonians)
- Nick Fraser (Boroughmuir)
- Gary Graham (Gala)
- Robin Hislop (Edinburgh/Boroughmuir)
- George Hunter (Glasgow Warriors/Glasgow Hawks)
- Andy Kirkland (Glasgow Hawks)
- Robert McAlpine (West Of Scotland)
- Andrew Nagle (Jed Forest)
- Colin Phillips (Edinburgh/Stewart's Melville)
- Grant Runciman (Melrose)
- Alex Spence (Heriot's)
- Mitchell Todd (Nottingham)
- George Turner (Stewart's Melville)
- James Tyas (Bath)
- Hamish Watson (Leicester Tigers)

Backs

- Jonny Adams (Aberdeen Grammar Rugby)
- Sam Atkin (Edinburgh Accies)
- Mark Bennett (Ayr)
- Glenn Bryce (Stirling County)
- Mike Doneghan (Glasgow Warriors/Stirling County)
- Fraser Gillies (Racing Metro 92)
- Kerr Gossman (Glasgow Warriors/Glasgow Hawks)
- Stuart Hogg (Glasgow Warriors/Hawick)
- Gregor Hunter (Edinburgh/Heriot's)
- Craig Jackson (Melrose)
- Harris Jones (Boroughmuir)
- Sean Kennedy (Stirling County)
- Harry Leonard (Boroughmuir)
- Harry Mountain (Team Northumbria)
- Tom Steven (Glasgow Hawks)
- Jamie Stevenson (Westcombe Park)

=== 2010 ===
2010 IRB Junior World Championship Squad
Forwards
- David Denton (Edinburgh Accies)
- Michael Fedo (Watsonians)
- Adam Fedorciow (University of Bath)
- Grant Gilchrist (Stirling County)
- Rob Harley (West of Scotland)
- George Hunter (Glasgow Hawks)
- Anthony Kent (London Scottish)
- Nicky Little (Hawick)
- Robert McAlpine (West of Scotland)
- Michael Maltman (Heriot's)
- Stuart McInally (Watsonians)
- Colin Philips (Stewart's Melville)
- Calum Stidston-Nott (London Scottish)
- Alun Walker (Currie)

Backs

- Alex Black (Leeds Carnegie)
- Tom Brown (Edinburgh Accies)
- Alex Dunbar (Selkirk)
- Dougie Fife (Currie)
- Oliver Grove (Worcester Warriors)
- James Johnstone (Currie)
- Jonny Kennedy (Sale Sharks)
- Callum MacBurnie (Moseley)
- Matthew Scott (Currie)
- Michael Tait (Newcastle Falcons)
- Duncan Weir (Glasgow Hawks)
- Russell Weir (Loughborough Students)

2010 Six Nations Under 20 Championship Squad
Forwards
- Stuart McInally (Watsonians)
- David Denton (Edinburgh Accies)
- Grant Gilchrist (Stirling County)
- Rob Harley (West of Scotland)
- Nicky Little (Hawick)
- Alun Walker (Currie)
- Craig Owensen (Heriot's)
- Euan Dods (Gala)
- Michael Fedo (Watsonians)
- Jason Hill (Heriot's)
- Aaron Hall (Newcastle Falcons)
- Matthew Reid (Heriot's)
- Andrew Fraser (Leeds Carnegie)
- Lindsey Gibson (Melrose)
- Anthony Kent (London Wasps)
- Chris Thomson (Loughborough University)
- Callum Stidston-Nott (London Scottish)
- Ross Sutherland (Stewart's Melville)
- Callum Taylor (Glasgow Hawks)
- Sam Blackwood (Stewart's Melville)
- Luke Pettie (Melrose)
- Mungo Strachan (Edinburgh Accies)
- Adam Fedorciow (University of Bath)
- Michael Maltman (Watsonians)

Backs

- Tom Brown (Edinburgh Accies)
- Michael Tait (Newcastle Falcons)
- Alex Dunbar (Selkirk)
- George Watkins (Bristol Rugby)
- Alex Blair (Edinburgh Accies)
- Dougie Fife (Currie)
- Matthew Scott (Currie)
- Sam Hughes (Loughborough University)
- Callum Williams (Stewart's Melville)
- Callum MacBurnie (Moseley)
- Max Learmonth (Watsonians)
- Kris Hamilton (Caithness)
- Rory Drummond (Edinburgh Accies)
- Oliver Grove (Worcester Warriors)
- Ross Aitken (Howe of Fife)
- Paddy Boyer (Glasgow Hawks)
- Alex Black (Leeds Carnegie)
- James Johnstone (Currie)
- Jonny Kennedy (Sale Sharks)
- Seamus McKenzie (Stewart's Melville)
- Russell Weir (Loughborough University)

=== 2009 ===
2009 IRB Junior World Championship Squad
Forwards
- Fraser Brown (Watsonians)
- Finlay Gillies (Heriot's)
- Gavin Cameron (Stirling County)
- David Morton (Bridgwater and Albion)
- Douglas Orr (Haddington)
- Grant Shiells (Kelso)
- Nick Campbell (Glasgow Hawks)
- Grant Gilchrist (Stirling County)
- Richie Gray (Glasgow Warriors)
- Rob Harley (West of Scotland)
- Struan Dewar (Heriot's)
- Chris Fusaro (Heriot's)
- Stuart McInally (Watsonians)
- Ryan Wilson (London Scottish)

Backs

- Peter Jericevich (Glasgow Hawks)
- Henry Pyrgos (Wimbourne)
- Robbie McGowan (Stirling County)
- Andrew White (Glasgow Hawks)
- Alex Dunbar (Selkirk)
- Robbie Johnston (Leeds University and Leeds Carnegie)
- James Knight (Bedford)
- Ashleah McCulloch (Aberdeen Grammar)
- Steven Aitken (Aberdeen Grammar)
- Grant Anderson (Ayr)
- Peter Horne (Glasgow Warriors)
- Paul Loudon (Durham University and Edinburgh Accies)

2009 Six Nations Under 20 Championship Squad
Forwards
- David Morton (Bridgwater and Albion)
- Gavin Cameron (Stirling County)
- Douglas Orr (Haddington)
- Grant Shiells (Kelso)
- Calum McConnachie (Hillhead/Jordanhill)
- Fraser Brown (Watsonians)
- Finlay Gillies (Heriot's)
- Ryan McConnell (Peebles)
- Richie Gray (Glasgow Warriors)
- Nick Campbell (Glasgow Hawks)
- Mark Anderson (Harrogate)
- James Taylor (Loughborough University)
- Chris Fusaro (Heriot's)
- Neil Rodger (Haddington)
- Tom Drennan (Edinburgh Academicals)
- Struan Dewar (Heriot's)
- Ryan Wilson (London Scottish)

Backs

- Peter Jericevich (Glasgow Hawks)
- Andrew Dymock (Dundee HSFP)
- Henry Pyrgos (Loughborough University)
- Cameron Brown (Loughborough University)
- Andrew White (Glasgow Hawks)
- Robbie Johnston (Leeds University and Leeds Carnegie)
- Steven Wilson (Stirling County)
- Paul Loudon (Durham University and Edinburgh Accies)
- Ashleigh McCulloch (Aberdeen Grammar)
- Steven Aitken (Aberdeen Grammar)
- Grant Anderson (Ayr)
- Adam McKenzie (Darlington Mowden Park and Northumbria University)
- Peter Horne (West of Scotland)
- Fraser Thomson (Gala)
- Robbie McGowan (Stirling County)

=== 2008 ===
2008 IRB Junior World Championship Squad
Forwards
- Jonny Baird (Watsonians)
- Steven Burton (Currie)
- Lewis Calder (Newcastle Falcons)
- Angus Dixon (Aberdeen Grammar FP)
- Adrian Duncan (Stewart's-Melville FP and National Senior Academy)
- Fraser McKenzie (Heriot's and National Senior Academy)
- Lewis Niven (Edinburgh Academicals)
- Neale Patrick (Dunfermline)
- Gary Strain (Glasgow Hawks and National Junior Academy)
- Craig Simmonds (Heriot's)
- Joe Stafford (Hillhead/Jordanhill and National Senior Academy)
- Richie Gray (Stirling County and National Senior Academy)
- Andrew Rose (Gloucester)
- Niall Shannon (Aberdeen Grammar FP).

Backs

- Murray Allan (Loughborough University)
- Tom Bury (Boroughmuir and National Junior Academy)
- Ruaridh Jackson (Glasgow Hawks and National Senior Academy)
- Lee Jones (Selkirk)
- Chris Kinloch (Edinburgh Academicals and National Senior Academy)
- Paul Loudon (Durham University)
- Steve McColl (Dunfermline and National Senior Academy)
- Jamie Murray (Leeds Carnegie and Edinburgh Academicals)
- Peter Horne (Howe of Fife)
- Peter Jericevich (GHA and National Senior Academy)
- Steven Wilson (Dundee HSFP and National Junior Academy)
- Ross Samson (Newcastle Falcons)

2008 Six Nations Under 20 Championship Squad
Forwards
- Gary Strain (Glasgow Hawks and National Junior Academy)
- Angus Dixon (Aberdeen Grammar Rugby)
- Adrian Duncan (Stewarts-Melville FP and National Senior Academy)
- Ben Ainscough (Northumbria Univ)
- Adam Ferrier (Southend)
- Joe Stafford (Hillhead/Jordanhill and National Senior Academy)
- Lewis Niven (Edinburgh Accies)
- Neale Patrick (Dunfermline)
- Josh Brown (Bristol)
- Craig Charters (Hawick)
- Fraser McKenzie (Heriot's and National Senior Academy)
- Steven Burton (Currie)
- Kevin Bryce (Stirling County and National Junior Academy)
- Lewis Calder (Newcastle Falcons)
- Jonny Baird (Leicester Univ)
- Craig Simmonds (Heriot's).

Backs

- Murray Allan (Loughborough Univ)
- Chris Kinloch (Edinburgh Accies and National Senior Academy)
- Ruaridh Jackson (Glasgow Hawks and National Senior Academy)
- Steve McColl (Dunfermline and National Senior Academy)
- Ruaridh Bonner (Edinburgh Accies)
- Tom Bury (Boroughmuir and National Junior Academy)
- Lee Jones (Selkirk)
- Jamie Murray (Leeds)
- Mathew Heeks (London Scottish)
- Ross Samson (Newcastle Falcons)
- John Goldie (Heriot's)
- Richard McCallum (Ayr)
- Jonny Smart (Dunfermline)
- Aubrey Horton (Dundee HSFP)
