= Rory Hutchinson =

Scotland international rugby union player

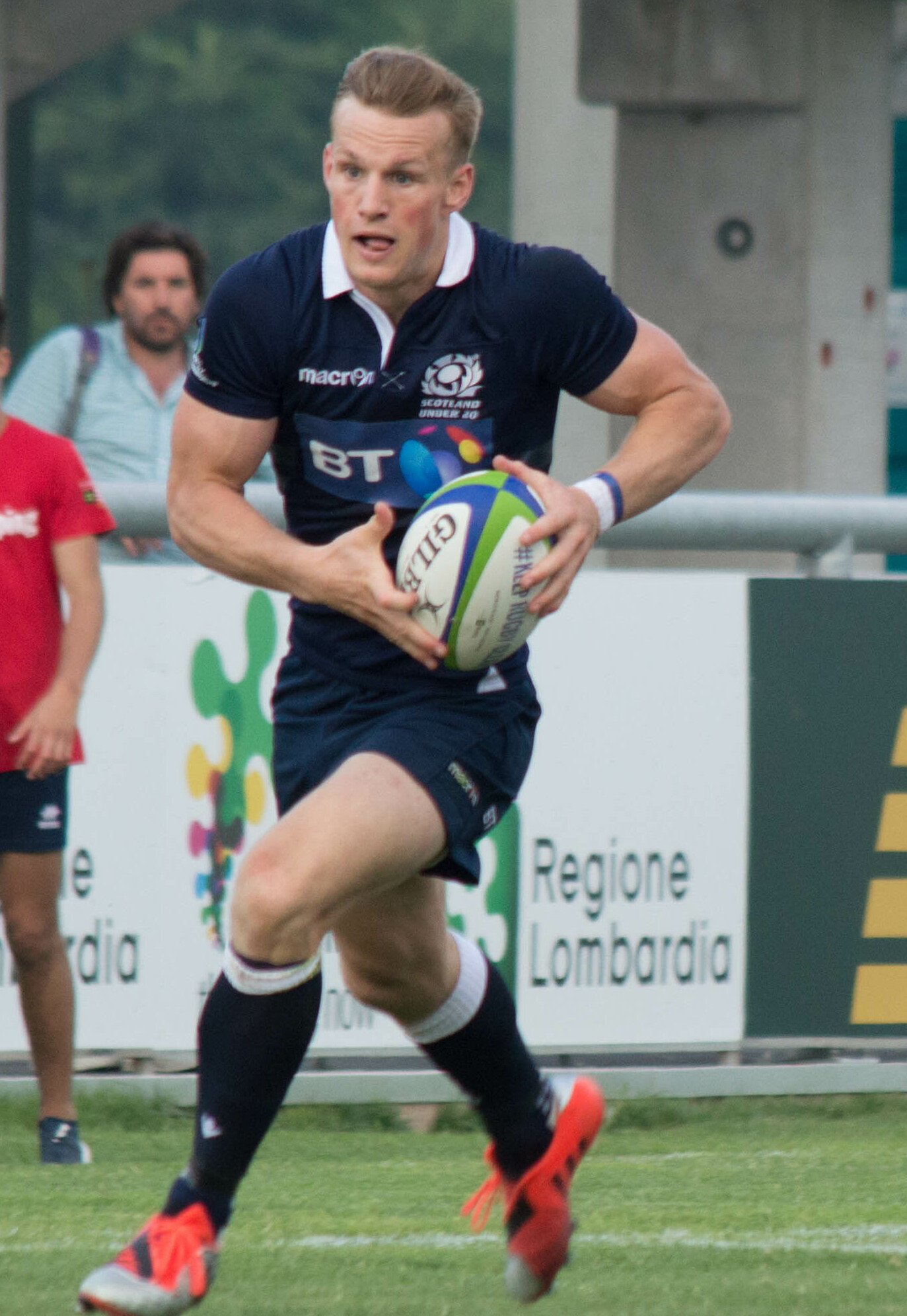
- Hutchinson representing Scotland during the World Rugby U20 Championship
- Born: 29 January 1996 (age 30) Cambridge, England
- Height: 1.81 m (5 ft 11 in)
- Weight: 95 kg (209 lb; 14 st 13 lb)
- School: Felsted School

Rugby union career
- Position(s): Centre, Fullback, Fly-Half
- Current team: Northampton Saints
Senior career
Years	Team	Apps	(Points)
2013–2014	Shelford	12	(97)
2014	→ Moseley (loan)	4	(5)
2015–	Northampton Saints	207	(280)
2015–2016	→ Coventry (loan)	9	(5)
2016	→ Rotherham Titans (loan)	1	(0)
2018	→ Bedford Blues (loan)	10	(0)
- Correct as of 3 January 2026
International career
Years	Team	Apps	(Points)
2014	Scotland U18	4	(0)
2014–2016	Scotland U20	20	(37)
2019–	Scotland	15	(25)
- Correct as of 18 November 2026

Rory Hutchinson (born 29 January 1995) is a professional rugby union player who plays as a centre for Premiership Rugby club Northampton Saints. Born in England, he represents Scotland at international level after qualifying on ancestry grounds.

== Club career ==
Rory Hutchinson plays predominantly at centre. He began his rugby career at National League 2 South side Shelford RFC.

He joined the Saints' Academy in July 2014. Hutchinson made his senior debut for the club on 31 January 2015, aged just 19 as Saints played local rivals Leicester Tigers.

The centre went on to make his Aviva Premiership debut against Exeter Chiefs in September 2016. Hutchinson scored the club's try of the season in Saints' tight one point victory over their guest.

Since 2017 Hutchinson has been a regular for the Saints' senior side. In 2019 he was part of the team that won the Premiership Cup v Saracens. He won the Gallagher Premiership Player on the month in February 2019 and has been nominated several times since then.

== International career ==
Hutchinson's maternal grandparents were born in Scotland. He first represented Scotland at U18 level. After having impressed at under-18 level, he was called up into the under-20 team. Playing in the IRB Junior World Cup in New Zealand Hutchinson went on to play in 2 further U20 World Cups and 2 U20 Six Nations series. He fell just one appearance short of the all-time record for number of appearance for the Scotland U20 side, playing 20 times for the country at that level.

He received his first full senior cap from the bench for Scotland in the World Cup warm-up match against France on 17 August 2019. He has gone on to gain a further 11 caps and scored 5 tries.

== Career statistics ==
=== List of international tries ===
No.	Date	Venue	Opponent	Score	Result	Competition
1	30 October 2021	Dinamo Arena, Tbilisi, Georgia	Georgia	18-0	10-44	2019 Rugby World Cup warm-up matches
2	30 October 2021	Dinamo Arena, Tbilisi, Georgia	Georgia	26-0	10-44	2019 Rugby World Cup warm-up matches
3	26 August 2023	Estadio 23 de Agosto, San Salvador de Jujuy, Argentina	Argentina	10-18	26-18	2022 Scotland rugby union tour of Argentina
4	18 July 2025	Eden Park, Auckland, New Zealand	Samoa	12-0	12-41	2025 mid-year rugby union tests
5	4 July 2026	Estadio Mario Alberto Kempes, Córdoba, Argentina	Argentina	17-10	38-47	Nations Championship

as of 5 July 2026

== Honours ==
Northampton

- Premiership Rugby: 2023–24, 2025–26
- Premiership Rugby Cup: 2018–19
- European Rugby Champions Cup runner-up: 2024–25
