= Ross Graham =

Ross Graham may refer to:

- Ross Graham (rugby union)
- Ross Graham (footballer)
