= Kwagga =

Kwagga is a nickname, taken from the Afrikaans name for the quagga, an extinct subspecies of the plains zebra. People with this nickname include:

- Kwagga Smith (born 1993), South African rugby union player
- Kwagga van Niekerk (born 1999), South African-born Scottish rugby union player

== See also ==
- Kwaggafontein
