= Ross Thompson (rugby union, born 1999) =

Scotland international rugby union player

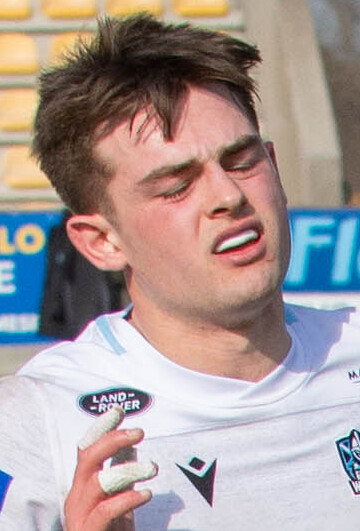
- Born: Ross Eric Thompson; 10 April 1999 (age 27) Edinburgh, Scotland
- Height: 1.83 m (6 ft 0 in)
- Weight: 86 kg (13 st 8 lb)
- Notable relative(s): Eric Thompson, grandfather Kirsty Gilmour, cousin

Rugby union career
- Position: Fly-half / Fullback
Amateur team(s)
Years	Team	Apps	(Points)
2017–2019	Glasgow Hawks	24	(42)
Senior career
Years	Team	Apps	(Points)
2021–2024	Glasgow Warriors	52	(292)
2024–	Edinburgh	26	(166)
- Correct as of 4 October 2024
Super Rugby
Years	Team	Apps	(Points)
2019–2021	Ayrshire Bulls	29	(83)
International career
Years	Team	Apps	(Points)
2018–2019	Scotland U20	20	(76)
2021–	Scotland	6	(22)
2022–	Scotland 'A'	2	(10)
- Correct as of 24 November 2024

Ross Thompson (born 10 April 1999) is a Scotland international rugby union player. He plays for Edinburgh in the United Rugby Championship. Thompson's primary position is Flyhalf. Thompson has previously played for Glasgow Warriors and the Ayrshire Bulls.

== Career ==
=== Amateur career ===
Thompson played for Glasgow Hawks. He made 14 appearances for the first team in 2017–18 season scoring 21 pts including 1 try and 10 appearances in 2018–19 season scoring 21 points. Peter Horne coached him at the club:

When he came out of school, I coached him at Glasgow Hawks for a year, and I couldn't believe how far ahead he was of where I would have been at his age. He had such a polished kicking game, he had a really nice passing game, and he was pretty studious – anything you asked him to do, he'd go away and learn it and come back – so he was just a good all-round player.

=== Professional career ===
Thompson was signed by the Ayrshire Bulls to play in the Super 6 league in 2019. He scored 61 points for the club in the 2019–20 season, the 3rd highest points scorer in the league that season.

Thompson signed for Glasgow Warriors in 2021. He made his debut for Glasgow Warriors in Round 10 of the 2021–22 URC against Edinburgh coming on as a replacement on 2 January 2021. He became Glasgow Warrior No. 319. He won man of the match in his first start for the club. He became the third fastest player to reach 100 points for the Warriors, with a conversion in the URC match against Leinster on 4 June 2021, 153 days after his competitive debut. (Tommy Hayes with a competitive debut on 8 September 1997 secured his 100 points on 24 October 1997. This was only 77 days. Dan Parks with a competitive debut on 19 September 2003 secured his 100 points on 16 January 2004, totalling 119 days. Thompson is one of only 4 Warriors in history to break the 100 points milestone in their debut season for the club, the other being Calvin Howarth who reached that total in 189 days.) He would go on to add to this in the match with a penalty that secured the win over the Irish provincial Leinster side, with Glasgow winning 15–12. He won Young Player of the Season for the 2021–22 season in the annual Glasgow Warriors awards; and then was later announced to also win the Player of the Season award too, becoming the second player to win both the Young Player and Player of the Season award in the same season; George Horne pulling off the same feat in the 2017–18 season.

On 23 May 2024, Edinburgh announced Thompson would be joining the club ahead of the 2024–25 season. He made his debut for Edinburgh against Leinster on 20 September 2024, scoring four points.

=== International career ===
Thompson has been capped by Scotland U20. In June 2021 he was called up to the Scotland squad for the Summer internationals.

Thompson made his Scotland debut against Tonga on 30 October 2021. Scotland won the match 60 - 14, Thompson scoring 2 conversions.

He was capped by Scotland 'A' on 25 June 2022 in their match against Chile.

== Family ==
Thompson's grandfather Eric Thompson represented Scotland at cricket; his uncle Graeme Thompson represented Scotland at rugby league; and his cousin Kirsty Gilmour is a Commonwealth Games medalist for Scotland in Badminton.
