= Jim Calder (rugby union) =

British Lions & Scotland international rugby union player

- Born: James Hamilton Calder; 20 August 1957 (age 69) Haddington, East Lothian, Scotland

Rugby union career
Amateur team(s)
Years	Team	Apps	(Points)
-	Stewart's Melville		
Provincial / State sides
Years	Team	Apps	(Points)
-	Edinburgh District		
-	Reds Trial		
-	Combined Scottish Districts		
International career
Years	Team	Apps	(Points)
1979-80	Scotland 'B'	2	
1981-85	Scotland	27	(12)
1983	British & Irish Lions	1	(0)

James Hamilton Calder (born 20 August 1957) is a former Scotland international rugby union player.

== Rugby Union career ==
=== Amateur career ===
He played club rugby for Stewart's Melville.

=== Provincial career ===
He played for Edinburgh District. He was part of the side that won the 1986–87 Scottish Inter-District Championship.

He played for the Reds Trial side in their match against Blues Trial on 3 January 1987.

He played for Combined Scottish Districts on 1 March 1986 against South of Scotland.

=== International career ===
He received 2 caps for Scotland 'B' in 1979 to 1980.

His full international debut came in 1981 aged 21 against France. Scotland were on the receiving end of a 16–9 loss. He scored the winning try in Scotland's 21–12 victory over France at Murrayfield in 1984 which gave Scotland its first Grand Slam since 1925.

In 1983 he toured New Zealand with the British & Irish Lions.

== Family ==
His twin brother, Finlay Calder, also played for Scotland and captained the 1989 British Lions tour to Australia. The brothers never played in the same Scotland side; Jim Calder won the last of his caps against Wales in March 1985 and Finlay made his debut against France in January 1986. Jim won a total of 27 caps, with his career record ending as: Won 12, Lost 13, Drew 2.

His two sons, Duncan and Lewis, have also represented Scotland at U21 level. Duncan, his elder son, retired from the game due to knee problems. He also has a daughter called Hannah.
