= Charlie Shiel =

Scottish rugby union player

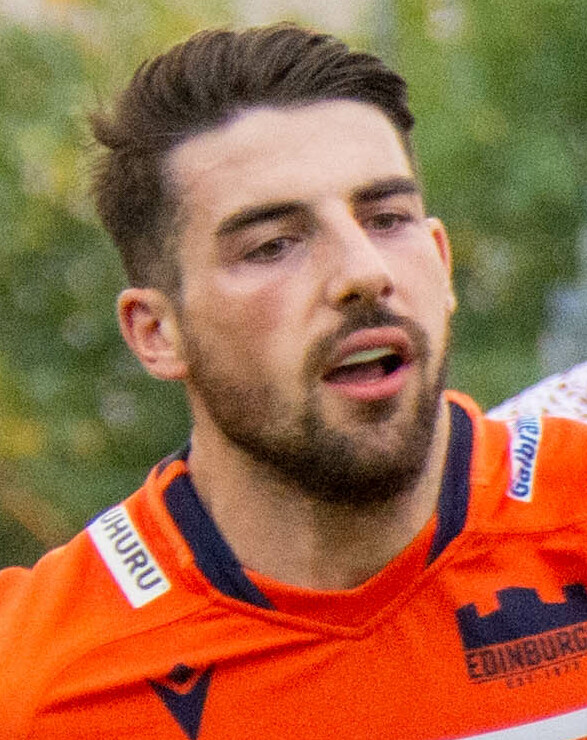
- Shiel at the 2022–23 United Rugby Championship
- Born: Charlie Shiel; 3 December 1997 (age 28) Melrose, Scotland
- Height: 5 ft 10 in (1.78 m)
- Weight: 76 kg (12 st 0 lb)
- School: Royal High School, Edinburgh
- Notable relative(s): Graham Shiel, father Dougie Morgan, grandfather

Rugby union career
- Position: Scrum-half
Senior career
Years	Team	Apps	(Points)
2016–	Edinburgh Rugby	56	(30)
2023	→ Edinburgh 'A'	2	(0)
- Correct as of 26 April 2023
International career
Years	Team	Apps	(Points)
2015	Scotland U18	1	(0)
2016–2017	Scotland U20	16	(5)
National sevens team
Years	Team		Comps
2018–2019	Scotland 7s		3 (0)

Charlie Shiel is a Scottish rugby union player who currently plays for Edinburgh Rugby in the United Rugby Championship.

== Rugby Union career ==
=== Amateur career ===
Shiel is the son of Graham Shiel, and grandson of Dougie Morgan; both former Scotland rugby union international players. A former pupil of the Royal High School, Edinburgh, Shiel played for their then associated side RHC Cougars. He signed for Currie in 2015. Shiel entered the Scottish Rugby Academy in the 2015-16 season as a Stage 2 player.

=== Professional career ===
Shiel was previously enrolled in the BT Sport Scottish Rugby Academy as a Stage 3 player. Stage 3 players are aligned to a professional club and given regional support. In 2016, 2016-17, Shiel first became a Stage 3 player assigned to Edinburgh Rugby Shiel remains a Stage 3 player for the 2017-18 season still assigned to Edinburgh Rugby. However Shiel has turned out for Glasgow Warriors in their 2017-18 pre-season match against Northampton Saints.

=== International career ===
Shiel has played for Scotland U16, scoring two tries in his 3 caps for the side. He made an appearance off the bench for the Scotland U18 side against England U18. He has had 10 caps for the Scotland U20 side. Shiel received his first call up to the senior Scotland squad in February 2021 for the 2021 Six Nations Championship.
