= Finlay Calder =

British rugby union player (born 1957)

Finlay Calder OBE
- Born: 20 August 1957 (age 69) Haddington, East Lothian, Scotland
- School: Stewart's Melville College
- Notable relative(s): Jim Calder (brother); Lewis Calder (nephew)

Rugby union career
- Position: Flanker
Amateur team(s)
Years	Team	Apps	(Points)
-	Stewart's Melville		
–	Heriots		
Provincial / State sides
Years	Team	Apps	(Points)
-	Edinburgh District		
1986	Combined Scottish Districts		
International career
Years	Team	Apps	(Points)
1983-84	Scotland 'B'	2	
1986-91	Scotland	34	(8)
1989	British and Irish Lions	3	(0)

Finlay Calder OBE (born 20 August 1957) is a Scotland international former rugby union player.

== Rugby Union career ==
=== Amateur career ===
Born in Haddington, East Lothian and educated at Stewart's Melville College,

Calder played at open side flanker. He played for Stewart's Melville and Heriots.

=== Provincial career ===
He played for Edinburgh District. He was part of the side that won the 1986–87 Scottish Inter-District Championship.

He played for Combined Scottish Districts on 1 March 1986 against South of Scotland.

=== International career ===
He received 2 caps for Scotland 'B' in 1983 to 1984.

His full international debut was against France in 1986.

He won 34 caps representing Scotland from 1986 to 1991. His last international game was against New Zealand in the third-place play-off match in the 1991 Rugby World Cup.

He captained the British and Irish Lions tour to Australia in 1989.

Richard Bath wrote that

"Calder's ability to use his drive, determination and innate knowledge of the game to overcome his undoubted shortcomings - in particular he was always a bit slow for an out-and-out open-side - helped him become one of the most effective back-row operators of the modern era. If he and the other two members of the Grand Slam back row John Jeffrey and Derek White could not impose their own game, they certainly would make sure that the opposition could not impose theirs".

When in 1989 Calder captained the Lions, he was the first Scottish player selected to do this since Mike Campbell-Lamerton in 1966 and the first captain to lead the side to victory since Willie John McBride in 1974.

== Honours ==
Calder was appointed OBE in the 1990 New Year Honours.

== Family ==
His twin brother Jim Calder also played for Scotland and the Lions. The brothers never played in the same Scotland side; Jim won the last of his caps against Wales in March 1985 and Finlay made his debut against France in January 1986.

He has two children.
