= 1994 Scotland rugby union tour of Argentina =

Series of rugby matches played by the Scottish national team

- Tour captain: Andy Reed
- Top point scorer: Michael Dods (29)
- Top try scorer: Kenny Logan (3)
Summary
P	W	D	L
Total
6	2	1	3
Test match
2	0	0	2
Opponent
P	W	D	L
Argentina
2	0	0	2

Tour chronology
- ← 1993 South Pacific 1995 Zimbabwe →

The 1994 Scotland rugby union tour of Argentina was a series of matches played in May and June 1994 in Argentina by Scotland national rugby union team. The Scottish side played a total of 6 matches in Argentina, winning only two with 3 loses.

== Match summary ==
Complete list of matches played by Scotland in Argentina:

Test matches

#	Date	Rival	City	Venue	Score
1	25 May	Buenos Aires RU	Buenos Aires	Ferro C. Oeste	24–24
2	28 May	Cuyo RU	Mendoza	Independiente Rivadavia	25–11
3	31 May	Córdoba RU	Córdoba	Club Universitario	42–14
4	4 Jun	Argentina	Buenos Aires	Ferro C. Oeste	15–16
5	8 Jun	Rosario RU	Rosario	Jockey Club	16–27
6	11 Jun	Argentina	Buenos Aires	Ferro C. Oeste	17–19

Balance
Pl	W	D	L	Ps	Pc
6	2	1	3	139	111

== Test details ==
=== First test ===
4 June 1994

Argentina	16–15	Scotland
Try: Terán; Con: Mesón; Pen: Mesón (3)		Pen: Dods (5)

Ferro C. Oeste, Buenos Aires
Referee: Wayne Erickson (Australia)

Argentina	Scotland

Argentina: 15.Santiago Mesón, 14.Martín Terán, 13.Diego Cuesta Silva, 12.Marcelo Loffreda (capt), 11.Jorge, 10.Del Castillo, 9.Miranda, 8.Camerlinckx, 7.Temperley, 6.Rolando Martín, 5.Pedro Sporleder, 4.Germán Llanes, 3.Patricio Noriega, 2.Angelillo, 1.Corral
Scotland: 15.Dods, 14.Jonier, 13.Jardine, 12.Schiel, 11.Logan, 10.Townsend, 9.Redpath, 8.Hogg, 7.Smith, 6.Walton, 5.Reed (capt), 4.Munro, 3.Burnell, 2.McKenzie, 1.Sharp

=== Second test ===
11 June 1994

Argentina	19–17	Scotland
Try: Martín; Con: Mesón; Pen: Mesón (3); Drop: del Castillo		Try: Logan; Con: Shiel (2), Dods; Drop: Townsend

Ferro C. Oeste, Buenos Aires
Referee: Wayne Erickson (Australia)

Argentina	Scotland

Argentina: S. Mesón; M. Terán, M. Loffreda (capt), D. Cuesta Silva, G. Jorge; G. del Castillo, N. Fernández Miranda; C. Viel Temperley, J. Santamarina, R. Martín; G. Llanes, P. Sporleder; P. Noriega, J.J. Angelillo, F. Méndez
Scotland: M. Dods; C. Joiner, I. Jardine, G. Shiel, Y.. Logan; G. Townsend, B. Redpath; I.Smith, C. Hogg, P. Walton; A. Reed (capt), S. Munro; P. Burnell, K. McEnzie, A. Sharp

== Bibliography ==
- Stephen Jones, ed. (1995). Rothmans Rugby Union Yearbook 1995–96. Headline. ISBN 0-7472-7816-4.
