= Andy Reed (rugby union) =

British Lions & Scotland international rugby union player

- Born: 4 May 1969 (age 57) St Austell, Cornwall, England
- Height: 2.01 m (6 ft 7 in)
- Weight: 112 kg (17 st 9 lb)
- Notable relative: Amber Reed (niece)

Rugby union career
- Position: Lock
Senior career
Years	Team	Apps	(Points)
- Bodmin RFC
- Camborne RFC
- Bath Rugby
1996–2001	London Wasps	108	(30)
International career
Years	Team	Apps	(Points)
1993–1999	Scotland	18	
1993	British & Irish Lions	1	

Andy Reed (born 4 May 1969) is a British former rugby union player who played lock for Bodmin RFC, Camborne RFC, Bath Rugby, London Wasps, Cornwall Rugby Football Union, and represented Scotland 18 times between 1993 and 1999. He also represented the British & Irish Lions against New Zealand in 1993 and captained Scotland on their tour of Argentina in 1994. Whilst at Wasps he helped them win the Anglo-Welsh Cup in 2000.

He is now a plumber in Cornwall.
