= Nathan McBeth =

Scotland international rugby union player (born 1998)

- Born: 8 June 1998 (age 28) Welkom, South Africa
- Height: 1.90 m (6 ft 3 in)
- Weight: 121 kg (267 lb; 19 st 1 lb)
- School: Hoërskool Monument
- Notable relative: Kwagga van Niekerk (cousin)

Rugby union career
- Position: Loosehead Prop
Youth career
- 2011–2019: Golden Lions
Senior career
Years	Team	Apps	(Points)
2019–2021	Lions	10	(0)
2019	Golden Lions XV	4	(5)
2019–2021	Golden Lions	8	(5)
2021–present	Glasgow Warriors	64	(25)
- Correct as of 24 October 2022
International career
Years	Team	Apps	(Points)
2016	South Africa U18	3	(0)
2018	Scotland U20	4	(5)
2018	South Africa U20	3	(0)
2024–present	Scotland	10	(0)
- Correct as of 18 November 2026

Nathan McBeth (born 8 June 1998) is a Scotland international rugby union player who plays for Glasgow Warriors in the United Rugby Championship. He previously played for the Lions in Super Rugby, the Golden Lions in the Currie Cup and the Golden Lions XV in the Rugby Challenge. His primary position is loosehead prop. He has previously represented both South Africa and Scotland at youth level.

== Rugby union career ==
=== Professional career ===
McBeth made his Super Rugby debut for the Lions in March 2019, coming on as a replacement in their 47–39 victory over the Jaguares in Johannesburg.

McBeth signed for Glasgow Warriors on 24 October 2021. McBeth stated: "I'm very thankful for the opportunity to join the Warriors. It will be an honour to represent them for the next few years. I can’t wait to meet the team and start to train with them. It’s a dream come true for me. Glasgow has always stood out for me because of the exciting brand of rugby that they play and I’m very excited to become a part of that."

McBeth made his competitive debut as a replacement in the away match against Benetton Treviso on 27 November 2021. He became Glasgow Warrior No. 337.

=== International career ===
McBeth represented South Africa at Under-18 level, playing for the South Africa Schools team in the Under-19 International Series in 2016. At the start of 2018, he represented the Scotland Under-20 team at the 2018 Six Nations Under 20s Championship, and a few months later, he played for the South Africa Under-20 team at the 2018 World Rugby Under 20 Championship.

In June 2024 McBeth was called up to the senior Scotland squad for a tour of the Americas.

He made his Scotland debut against Canada on 6 July 2024 at TD Place Stadium in Ottawa. Scotland won the match 73 points to 12. McBeth has the Scotland no. 1225.
