= 1993 Scotland rugby union tour of the South Pacific =

Summary
P	W	D	L
Total
7	6	0	1
Test match
3	2	0	1
Opponent
P	W	D	L
Fiji
1	1	0	0
Tonga
1	1	0	0
Western Samoa
1	0	0	1

The 1993 Scotland rugby union tour of South Pacific was a series of matches played in Fiji, Tonga and Samoa in May and June 1993 by Scotland national rugby union team. It was an unofficial tour, because the Scottish Rugby Union did not award full international caps, due to the absence of the player involved in the British and Irish Lions tour to New Zealand.

== Results ==
Scores and results list Scotland's points tally first.

Opponent	For	Against	Date	Venue	Status
Fiji B	14	7	22 May 1993	AD Patel Stadium, Nadi	Tour match
Fiji Juniors	51	3	29 May 1993	National Stadium, Suva	Tour match
Fiji	21	10	29 May 1993	National Stadium, Suva	Test match
President XV	21	5	2 June 1993	Teufaiva Stadium, Nukuʻalofa	Tour match
Tonga	23	5	5 June 1993	Teufaiva Stadium, Nukuʻalofa	Test match
President XV	33	8	9 June 1993	Apia	Tour match
Samoa	11	28	12 June 1993	Apia	Test match
