= 1995 Scotland rugby union tour of Zimbabwe =

Summary
P	W	D	L
Total
4	4	0	0
Test match
2	2	0	0
Opponent
P	W	D	L
Zimbabwe
2	2	0	0

The 1995 Scotland rugby union tour of Zimbabwe was a series of matches played in May and June 1995 in Zimbabwe by a selection of Scottish players. It was a "Development team", that visit Zimbabwe while the Scottish official team was playing the 1995 Rugby World Cup in South Africa.

== Results ==
Scores and results list Scotland XV's points tally first.

Opponent	For	Against	Date	Venue	Status
Mashonaland Country	42	13	31 May 1995	Banket	Tour match
Zimbabwe	39	23	3 June 1995	Bulawayo	Tour match
Zimbabwe A	41	13	7 June 1995	Mutare	Tour match
Zimbabwe	43	22	10 June 1995	Harare	Tour match
