= Lewis Calder =

English rugby union player

Lewis Calder (born 4 May 1988 (age 36)) is a professional Rugby Union player who played flanker for London Scottish, retiring in 2014 due to injury. Previously, Calder captained the Scotland U21 side and represented the Scotland Sevens in 2010.

He is a former pupil of Stewart's Melville College and has had spells with the Newcastle Falcons and the Exeter Chiefs.

Calder is the son of 1984 Five Nations Championship Grand Slam Winner Jim Calder and nephew of former British Lions captain Finlay Calder.
