= Damien Hoyland =

Scotland international rugby union player

- Born: Damien Hoyland; 11 January 1994 (age 32) Edinburgh, Scotland
- Height: 1.78 m (5 ft 10 in)
- Weight: 85 kg (13 st 5 lb)
- School: James Gillespie's HS
- University: Telford College

Rugby union career
- Position: Wing/Full-back
- Current team: Old Glory DC
Senior career
| Years | Team | Apps | (Points) |
| 2014–2023 | Edinburgh Rugby | 105 | (130) |
| 2023- | Old Glory DC | 17 | (-) |
- Correct as of 26 April 2023
International career
| Years | Team | Apps | (Points) |
| 2013–2014 | Scotland U20 | 19 | (40) |
| 2015–2022 | Scotland | 5 | (5) |
| 2022 | Scotland 'A' | 1 | (15) |
- Correct as of 13 April 2023
National sevens team
| Years | Team | | Comps |
| 2014–2016 | Scotland 7s | | 11 |

Damien Hoyland (born 11 January 1994) is a Scottish rugby union player who is signed to Old Glory DC in Major League Rugby.

== Age grade rugby ==
The James Gillespie's HS former pupil represented Scotland under-17 as well as Edinburgh at under-16, under-17 and under-18 levels. He was part of the Scotland under-17 Sevens team which took part in the Youth Commonwealth Games on the Isle of Man in 2011.

== Sevens ==
In February 2015, he was named in the Wellington Sevens World Rugby dream team, after scoring seven tries, which made him the events top try scorer.

== International ==
Hoyland made his full international debut in the summer of 2015, and to date has garnered four caps. He scored his first test try during a 2017 summer victory over Italy.
