= Eric Thompson (cricketer) =

Scottish cricketer (1938–1992)

Personal information
- Born: 6 October 1938
- Died: 4 September 1992 (aged 53)
- Source: Cricinfo, 3 June 2019

Eric Thompson (6 October 1938 – 4 September 1992) was a Scottish cricketer. He played in sixteen first-class matches between 1965 and 1974. He was one of only two cricketers to represent Scotland who were born on the Orkney Islands. In May 2019, he was inducted into Cricket Scotland's Hall of Fame.
