= Kwagga van Niekerk =

Scottish rugby union player

- Born: 27 May 1999 (age 27) South Africa
- Height: 190 cm (6 ft 3 in)
- Weight: 106 kg (234 lb; 16 st 10 lb)
- School: Monument High School
- University: University of Johannesburg
- Notable relative: Nathan McBeth (cousin)

Rugby union career
- Position: Lock / Flanker / Number 8
- Current team: Colorno
Senior career
Years	Team	Apps	(Points)
2018−2021	Golden Lions XV	2	(0)
2022	Edinburgh Rugby	1	(0)
2022	Watsonians	13	(0)
2023	Colorno	7	(5)
- Correct as of 31 May 2022
International career
Years	Team	Apps	(Points)
2019	Scotland U20	7	(0)
- Correct as of 31 May 2022

Cristen Kwagga van Niekerk (born 27 May 1999) is a South African-born Scottish rugby union player for Colorno in the italian Top10. Van Niekerk's primary position is lock, flanker or number eight.

== Rugby union career ==
=== Professional career ===
Van Niekerk represented Golden Lions XV in the 2018 Rugby Challenge. He moved to Scotland in 2019 to represent Scotland U20, who he qualifies for through his mother. He made his Edinburgh debut on 11 February in the re-arranged Round 8 match of the 2021–22 United Rugby Championship against Leinster.

In January 2023 he signed for Colorno in the italian Top10 until end of the season.
