= Ross Graham (rugby union) =

Scottish rugby union player

- Born: Ross Graham; 20 December 1995 (age 30) Melrose, Scotland
- Height: 1.80 m (5 ft 11 in)
- Weight: 88 kg (13 st 12 lb)
- School: Hawick High School

Rugby union career
- Position: Hooker
Amateur team(s)
Years	Team	Apps	(Points)
- Hawick Albion
–	Hawick PSA		
–	Hawick		
–	Watsonians		
Senior career
Years	Team	Apps	(Points)
- Edinburgh
2016–18	Yorkshire Carnegie		
2019	Glasgow Warriors		
International career
Years	Team	Apps	(Points)
- Scotland U17
- Scotland U18
2014–15	Scotland U20		
–	Scotland Club XV		

Ross Graham is a Scotland Club XV international rugby union player. He plays as a Hooker.

== Rugby Union career ==
=== Amateur career ===
Graham won the Brewin Dolphin Schools Plate with his Hawick High School under-16 team. He first played with Hawick Albion then Hawick PSA.

Graham played for Hawick.

He then moved to Watsonians.

=== Professional career ===
Graham was named as a Stage 3 Scottish Rugby Academy player in 2015 assigned to Edinburgh. He played in an Edinburgh 'A' match against Glasgow Warriors 'A' in November 2015.

He was signed on a two-year deal by Yorkshire Carnegie in 2016.

Graham signed for Glasgow Warriors in 2019 to provide cover over the Rugby World Cup period; when Glasgow are expected to lose 16 international players to World Cup duty.

=== International career ===
Graham has played for Scotland U17 and Scotland U18 and made his Scotland U20 debut in 2014.

Graham played in all five of Scotland U20 matches in the 2015 U20 Six Nations tournament. He also played in the U20 World Cup for Scotland.

He was named in the 2016 and 2019 Scotland Club XV Squad.
