= Estadio 23 de Agosto =

Football stadium in Jujuy, Argentina

Coordinates: 24°11′55″S 65°17′27″W

23 de Agosto Stadium
- Estadio 23 de Agosto
- La Tacita de Plata
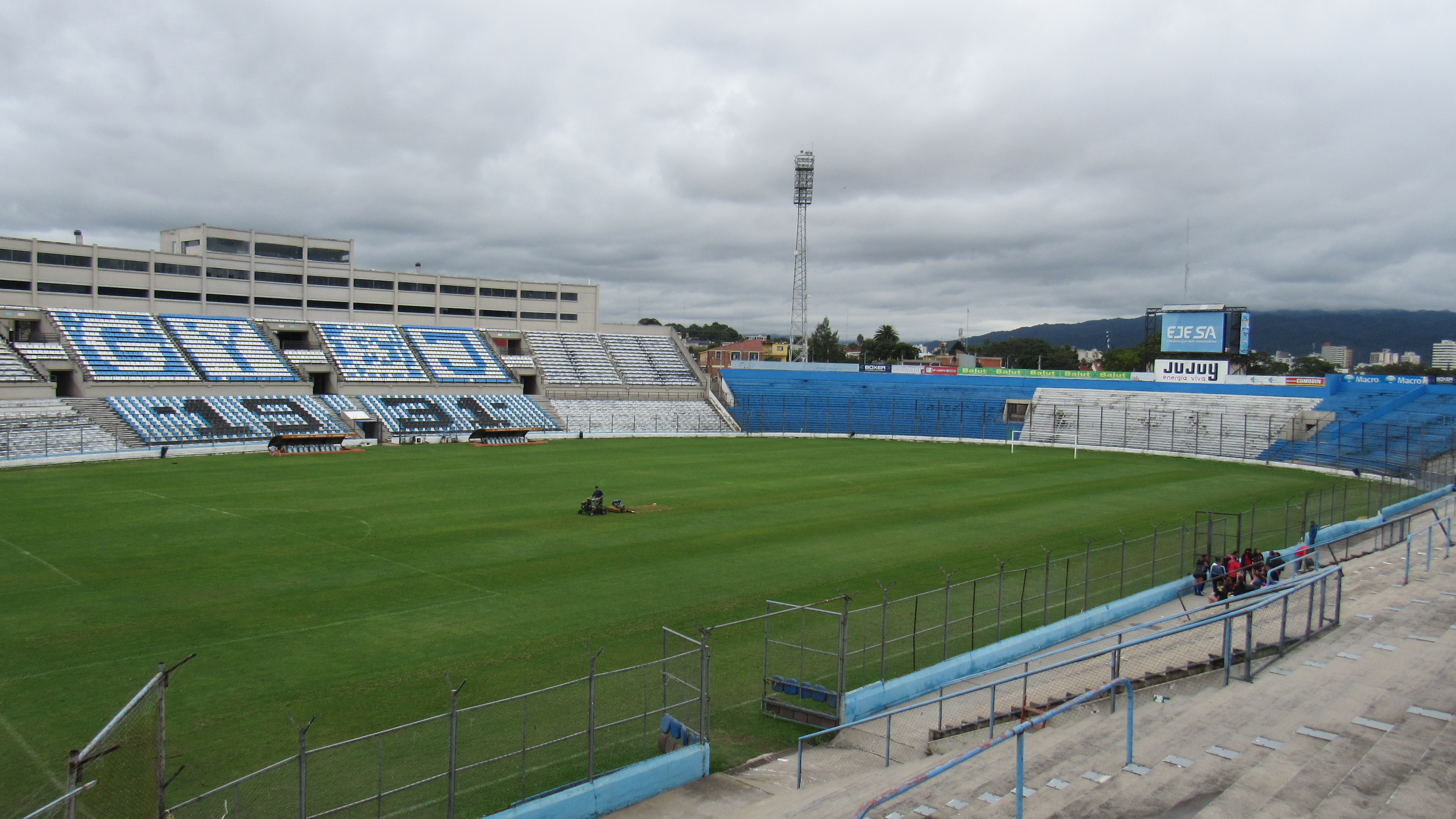
- View of the stadium in 2019
- Interactive map of 23 de Agosto Stadium
- Address: San Salvador de Jujuy; Argentina
- Owner: Gimnasia y Esgrima de Jujuy
- Operator: Gimnasia y Esgrima de Jujuy
- Capacity: 25,000
- Surface: Grass
- Field size: 105 x 78 m

Construction
- Built: 1973
- Opened: 18 March 1973; 53 years ago

Tenants
- Gimnasia y Esgrima de Jujuy (1973–present); Argentina national rugby team (2005–present)

Website
- gimnasiayesgrimadejujuy.com.ar/estadio

23 de Agosto Stadium, nicknamed La Tacita de Plata, is a football stadium in San Salvador de Jujuy, Argentina. The stadium is owned and operated by local club Gimnasia y Esgrima.

The stadium, inaugurated in 1973, currently holds 25,000 people and was one of the venues for the 2011 Copa América, having also hosted some rugby union matches.

== History ==
It was inaugurated on March 18, 1973, the date on which the club's anniversary is celebrated. It was in a match of the 1st round of 1973 Torneo Regional v Vélez Sársfield de Catamarca, won by Gimnasia y Esgrima 2–0. In 2009, the AFA confirmed Jujuy as one of the venues for the 2011 Copa América, and the stadium was remodeled for that purpose. Works included expansion of the grandstands (up to 24,000 spectators) and addition of press boxes and a giant screen in the north side of the stadium. All the refurbishments allowed Estadio 23 de Agosto to host two matches of the competition.

== Sporting events ==
=== Copa América ===
The stadium hosted the following matches of the 2011 Copa América:

Date	Group	Team #1	Res.	Team #2
2 July	Group A	Colombia	1–0	Costa Rica
7 July	Group A	Bolivia	0–2	Costa Rica

=== Rugby union ===
Estadio 23 de Agosto has hosted some rugby union games, most of them Argentina tests, detailed below:

Date	Event	Home team	Score	Away team	Ref.
4 Jun 2005	Italy tour	Argentina	14–32	Italy	
2 Jul 2022	Scotland tour	Argentina	26–18	Scotland	
29 Aug 2026	Copa VISA–Galicia (Note: Tournament sponsored by Banco Galicia.)	Argentina	21–27	Australia	

Notes

Preceded by various venues in Venezuela	Copa América; Venue; 2011	Succeeded by various venues in Chile
