= 2016–17 Glasgow Warriors season =

Glasgow Warriors 2016 / 2017
- Ground: Scotstoun Stadium (Capacity: 7,351)
- Coach: (Scotland) Gregor Townsend
- Captain(s): (Scotland) Jonny Gray (Scotland) Henry Pyrgos
- Most caps: (Scotland) Rob Harley (26)
- Top scorer: (Scotland) Finn Russell (142)
- Most tries: (Scotland) Tommy Seymour (9)
- League: Pro 12
- 6th
1st kit	2nd kit

During the 2016–17 season, the Glasgow Warriors competed in the Guinness Pro12 and the European Champions Cup. It was the team's last season under head coach Gregor Townsend. Due to the flooding of its grass pitch, an artificial turf surface was installed at Scotstoun Stadium.

== Overview ==
=== Coaching changes and new pitch ===
It was announced at the beginning of the season that it would be the last under head coach Gregor Townsend. Townsend was announced as taking over the Scotland head-coach role from Vern Cotter in the summer of 2017. The SRU named Townsend's successor, Dave Rennie (New Zealand head coach of the Super Rugby Chiefs), two days later. The Chiefs had won the Super Rugby title twice under Rennie.

Jason O'Halloran and Jonathan Humphreys were later also announced as joining the Warriors for the 2017–18 season. To avoid the problems which plagued the 2015–16 season (when Scotstoun Stadium became unplayable due to flooding), a new artificial-grass pitch was installed at the stadium.

=== Objectives ===
Since this would be head coach Gregor Townsend's last season with the Warriors, a good European run was a key target; the Warriors had never qualified for the quarter-finals of the European Champions Cup.

The Pro12 league began in 2011–12. Every year since then, the Warriors had made the play-offs during the final weeks; this was another target. The 1872 Cup had been held by Edinburgh Rugby for the previous two seasons, despite Glasgow finishing above Edinburgh in the Pro12 league in every year of Townsend's tenure, and Glasgow wanted the cup back west.

=== Results ===
A mixed season saw the team qualify for the European Champions Cup quarter-final for the first time, losing to the eventual champion Saracens. The Warriors missed a Pro12 play-off place for the first time, and the Autumn International and Six Nations Championship were particularly challenging.

With success came a problem. Glasgow were always a key supplier of players to the international team, but now they became a factory. It's hard to think of a side in world rugby that is as decimated by the international window as Glasgow. You pay a price for that eventually.

— BBC journalist Tom English

Although the Warriors won the 1872 Cup, they lost their home match to Edinburgh for the first time.

=== Townsend era ===
During Gregor Townsend's five-year tenure with the Warriors, he guided the team to the 2014-15 Pro12 title and a European Champions Cup quarter-final for the first time in 2016–17. Except for this season, the team made the Pro12 play-offs every year he was head coach.

It's hard to put into words how much he's done for the club. He's taken us to another level. We went from having 1,000 people at Firhill if we're lucky to selling out Scotstoun every single week regardless of how we're playing. The brand of rugby we're playing means Gregor's getting tipped for all sorts of jobs and, for the last two or three years, every club's probably been after him at some point.

I think we’ve moved from being a bit-part club to every time we take the field people expecting a bloody hard game. I think we expect to go out and win every game we play now, so we’ve certainly moved on.

— Peter Horne, Glasgow Warriors Centre

== Team ==
=== Coaches ===
- Head coach: (Scotland) Gregor Townsend
- Assistant coach: (Scotland) Matt Taylor
- Assistant coach: (Scotland) Kenny Murray
- Assistant coach: (England) Dan McFarland
- Assistant coach: (Scotland) Mike Blair
- Lead Strength and Conditioning Coach: (Scotland) Stuart Yule
- Asst. Strength and Conditioning Coach: (France) Thibault Giroud
- Asst. Strength and Conditioning Coach: (England) George Petrakos
- Lead Performance Analyst: Gavin Vaughan
- Asst. Performance Analyst: Greg Woolard

=== Staff ===
- Managing Director: Nathan Bombrys
- Chairman: Charles Shaw
- Advisory Group: Walter Malcolm, Douglas McCrea, Alan Lees, Jim Preston, Paul Taylor
- Rugby Operations Manager: John Manson
- Kit manager & Masseur: Dougie Mills
- Clinical Manager: Lisa Casey
- Team physiotherapist: Nicola McGuire
- Rehabilitation Physiotherapist: Gabrielle McCullough
- Team doctor: Dr. David Pugh
- Commercial Operations Manager: Alastair Kellock
- Communications Manager: Jeremy Bone
- Communications Asst: Jack Reid
- Operations manager: Stephanie Karvelis
- Marketing and Partnerships Manager: Darroch Ramsay
- Partnership Sales Manager: Laura Hynd
- Partnership Account Manager: Oliver Norman
- Partnership Account Manager: Jim Taylor
- Game On Project Development Officer: Lindsey Smith
- Community Rugby Coach: Stuart Lewis

=== Squad ===
Hookers (Scotland) Fraser Brown (New Zealand) Corey Flynn (Scotland) Pat MacArthur (Scotland) James Malcolm Props (Scotland) Alex Allan (Scotland) Zander Fagerson (New Zealand) Jarrod Firth (Scotland) Ryan Grant (Tonga) Sila Puafisi (Scotland) D'Arcy Rae (Scotland) Gordon Reid (Canada) Djustice Sears-Duru Locks (Samoa) Brian Alainu'uese (Scotland) Scott Cummings (Scotland) Jonny Gray (United States) Greg Peterson (Scotland) Tim Swinson (Namibia) Tjiuee Uanivi	Loose forwards (Scotland) Adam Ashe (Scotland) Hugh Blake (Italy) Simone Favaro (Scotland) Chris Fusaro (Scotland) Rob Harley (United States) Langilangi Haupeakui (Scotland) Ruaridh MacKenzie (Scotland) Matt Smith (Scotland) Josh Strauss (Scotland) Ryan Wilson (Scotland) Lewis Wynne Scrum halves (Scotland) Grayson Hart (Fiji) Nemia Kenatale (Scotland) Ali Price (Scotland) Henry Pyrgos Fly halves (England) Rory Clegg (Scotland) Finn Russell (New Zealand) Hagen Schulte (South Africa) Brandon Thomson	Centres (Scotland) Mark Bennett (Scotland) Alex Dunbar (Scotland) Nick Grigg (Scotland) Peter Horne (Australia) Sam Johnson (Scotland) Fraser Lyle (Scotland) Richie Vernon Back three (Scotland) Junior Bulumakau (Scotland) Rory Hughes (Scotland) Lee Jones (Scotland) Sean Lamont (Scotland) Tommy Seymour (Scotland) Stuart Hogg (Scotland) Peter Murchie (Italy) Leonardo Sarto (Australia) Ratu Tagive

Scottish Rugby Academy players assigned to a professional club were Stage 3 players. They were assigned to the Warriors for the season. Academy players promoted during the season are listed with the main squad.

- (Scotland) Cameron Fenton - Prop / Hooker
- (Scotland) Jamie Bhatti - Prop
- (Scotland) Callum Hunter-Hill - Lock
- (Scotland) Sam Thomson - Lock
- (Scotland) Bruce Flockhart - Flanker
- (Scotland) Matt Fagerson - No. 8
- (Scotland) George Horne - Scrum half
- (Scotland) Patrick Kelly - Centre
- (Scotland) Robert Beattie - Wing

Other players used by the Warriors during the season:

- (Scotland) Josh Henderson (Glasgow Hawks) – Scottish Rugby Academy Stage 2 player - Fly-half
- (Scotland) Shaun MacDonald (Stirling County) – Flanker
- (New Zealand) Alex Taylor (Stirling County) – Number Eight
- (Scotland) Peter McCallum (Ayr) – Number Eight
- (Scotland) Rob McAlpine (Ayr) – Lock
- (Scotland) Adam Nicol (Stirling County) – Prop
- (Scotland) Kiran McDonald - (Glasgow Hawks) – Lock

== Player statistics ==
During the season, Glasgow used 57 different players in competitive games. The table below shows the number of appearances and points scored by each player.

Position	Nation	Name	Pro12			Champions Cup			Total	
Position	Nation	Name	Apps (sub)	Tries	Points kicked	Apps (sub)	Tries	Points kicked	Apps (sub)	Total Pts
HK	(Scotland)	Fraser Brown	10(1)	1	0	7	2	0	17(1)	15
HK	(New Zealand)	Corey Flynn	5(7)	3	0	(3)	0	0	5(10)	15
HK	(Scotland)	Pat MacArthur	7(8)	2	0	(4)	1	0	7(12)	10
HK	(Scotland)	James Malcolm	1(4)	1	0	0	0	0	1(4)	5
PR	(Scotland)	Alex Allan	9(9)	1	0	(7)	0	0	9(16)	5
PR	(Scotland)	Jamie Bhatti	1(5)	0	0	0	0	0	1(5)	0
PR	(Scotland)	Zander Fagerson	5(5)	0	0	7	0	0	12(5)	0
PR	(Scotland)	Ryan Grant	(3)	0	0	0	0	0	(3)	0
PR	(Scotland)	Adam Nicol	(1)	0	0	0	0	0	(1)	0
PR	(Tonga)	Sila Puafisi	11(8)	1	0	(5)	0	0	11(13)	5
PR	(Scotland)	D'Arcy Rae	6(8)	0	0	(2)	0	0	6(10)	0
PR	(Scotland)	Gordon Reid	11(2)	1	0	7	0	0	18(2)	5
PR	(Canada)	Djustice Sears-Duru	1(3)	0	0	0	0	0	1(3)	0
LK	(Samoa)	Brian Alainu'uese	11(2)	0	0	1(2)	0	0	12(4)	0
LK	(Scotland)	Scott Cummings	5(3)	2	0	0	0	0	5(3)	10
LK	(Scotland)	Jonny Gray	11	2	0	7	1	0	18	15
LK	(Scotland)	Callum Hunter-Hill	(1)	0	0	0	0	0	(1)	0
LK	(Scotland)	Rob McAlpine	1(3)	0	0	0	0	0	1(3)	0
LK	(United States)	Greg Peterson	2(1)	0	0	(1)	0	0	2(2)	0
LK	(Scotland)	Tim Swinson	12(1)	2	0	6	0	0	18(1)	10
LK	(Scotland)	Sam Thomson	(1)	0	0	0	0	0	(1)	0
LK	(Namibia)	Tjiuee Uanivi	1(4)	0	0	0	0	0	1(4)	0
BR	(Scotland)	Adam Ashe	5(3)	2	0	1	0	0	6(3)	10
BR	(Scotland)	Matt Fagerson	3(4)	1	0	(1)	0	0	3(5)	5
BR	(Italy)	Simone Favaro	8(1)	0	0	1(1)	0	0	9(2)	0
BR	(Scotland)	Chris Fusaro	7(4)	0	0	(4)	0	0	7(8)	0
BR	(Scotland)	Rob Harley	16(3)	1	0	7	0	0	23(3)	5
BR	(United States)	Langilangi Haupeakui	(4)	0	0	0	0	0	(4)	0
BR	(Scotland)	Matt Smith	2(1)	1	0	0	0	0	2(1)	5
BR	(Scotland)	Josh Strauss	8	1	0	5(1)	1	0	13(1)	10
BR	(Scotland)	Ryan Wilson	10	0	0	7	2	0	17	10
BR	(Scotland)	Lewis Wynne	5(8)	0	0	(2)	0	0	5(10)	0
SH	(Scotland)	Grayson Hart	2(6)	0	0	0	0	0	2(6)	0
SH	(Scotland)	George Horne	(3)	0	0	0	0	0	(3)	0
SH	(Fiji)	Nemia Kenatale	(3)	0	0	0	0	0	(3)	0
SH	(Scotland)	Ali Price	8(6)	3	0	4(3)	2	0	12(9)	25
SH	(Scotland)	Henry Pyrgos	12(2)	0	17	3(3)	1	0	14(7)	5
FH	(England)	Rory Clegg	4(6)	1	30	0	0	0	4(6)	35
FH	(Scotland)	Finn Russell	8(1)	2	74	7	0	58	15(1)	142
FH	(New Zealand)	Hagen Schulte	(1)	0	0	0	0	0	(1)	0
FH	(South Africa)	Brandon Thomson	2(1)	1	7	0	0	0	2(1)	12
CE	(Scotland)	Mark Bennett	9(1)	3	0	3(3)	3	0	12(4)	30
CE	(Scotland)	Alex Dunbar	9(2)	2	0	6(1)	1	0	15(3)	15
CE	(Scotland)	Nick Grigg	13(3)	4	0	(4)	0	0	13(7)	20
CE	(Scotland)	Peter Horne	12(2)	1	42	1	0	0	13(2)	47
CE	(Australia)	Sam Johnson	9	1	0	4	0	0	13	5
CE	(Scotland)	Patrick Kelly	(1)	0	0	0	0	0	(1)	0
CE	(Scotland)	Richie Vernon	1(3)	0	0	0	0	0	1(3)	0
WG	(Scotland)	Junior Bulumakau	3(1)	2	0	0	0	0	3(1)	10
WG	(Scotland)	Rory Hughes	9(4)	3	0	2	1	0	11(4)	20
WG	(Scotland)	Lee Jones	12(3)	2	0	5	1	0	17(3)	15
WG	(Scotland)	Sean Lamont	4(7)	4	0	1	2	0	5(7)	30
WG	(Italy)	Leonardo Sarto	5(2)	1	0	1	2	0	6(2)	15
WG	(Scotland)	Tommy Seymour	12	8	0	5	1	0	17	45
WG	(Australia)	Ratu Tagive	(2)	1	0	0	0	0	(2)	5
FB	(Scotland)	Stuart Hogg	10(1)	5	10	7	0	10	17(1)	45
FB	(Scotland)	Peter Murchie	11(1)	4	0	(2)	0	0	11(3)	20

== Coaching changes ==
=== Promotion ===
- (Scotland) Mike Blair

=== Personnel in ===
- (France) Thibault Giroud

== Player movements ==
=== Academy promotions ===
- (Scotland) Matt Smith from Scottish Rugby Academy
- (Scotland) Lewis Wynne from Scottish Rugby Academy

=== Player transfers ===
==== In ====
- (New Zealand) Corey Flynn from (France) Toulouse
- (Italy) Leonardo Sarto from (Italy) Zebre
- (Fiji) Nemia Kenatale from (Romania) Farul Constanța
- (Namibia) Tjiuee Uanivi from (South Africa) Sharks
- (New Zealand) Hagen Schulte from (New Zealand) Marist Albion
- (United States) Langilangi Haupeakui from (United States) Sacramento Express
- (Scotland) Ruaridh MacKenzie from (Australia) Bond University RFC
- (Samoa) Brian Alainu'uese from (New Zealand) Waikato Rugby Union
- (Australia) Ratu Tagive from (Australia) Eastern Suburbs
- (Scotland) Cameron Fenton from (England) London Scottish (loan ended)
- (South Africa) Brandon Thomson from (South Africa) Stormers (loan)
- (Scotland) Patrick Kelly from (England) London Scottish (loan ended)
- (Scotland) Callum Hunter-Hill from (England) London Scottish (loan ended)

==== Out ====
- (Scotland) Duncan Weir to (Scotland) Edinburgh Rugby
- (Scotland) Glenn Bryce to (Scotland) Edinburgh Rugby
- (Scotland) Kevin Bryce to (Scotland) Edinburgh Rugby
- (Fiji) Leone Nakarawa to (France) Racing 92
- (Fiji) Jerry Yanuyanutawa (released)
- (Scotland) Tyrone Holmes (released)
- (Scotland) Will Bordill to (Scotland) Ayr
- (Georgia (country)) Shalva Mamukashvili (released)
- (Scotland) Fergus Scott to (Scotland) Currie
- (Scotland) Gregor Hunter to (Scotland) Gala
- (Wales) Javan Sebastian (released)
- (Australia) Taqele Naiyaravoro to (Australia) NSW Waratahs
- (Scotland) Kieran Low (released)
- (Scotland) Hugh Blake to (New Zealand) Bay of Plenty (loan)
- (Scotland) Cameron Fenton to (England) London Scottish (loan)
- (Scotland) Patrick Kelly to (England) London Scottish (loan)
- (Scotland) Callum Hunter-Hill to (England) London Scottish (loan)
- (Scotland) Ryan Grant to (England) Worcester Warriors
- (New Zealand) Jarrod Firth to (France) Grenoble
- (South Africa) Brandon Thomson to (South Africa) Stormers (loan ended)
- (United States) Langilangi Haupeakui (released)
- (England) Rory Clegg to (England) Ealing Trailfinders

== Competitions ==
=== Pre-season and friendlies ===
20 August 2016
4pm

(England) Harlequins	22 - 17	(Scotland) Glasgow Warriors
Try: Ross Chisholm; James Chisholm; Mat Luamanu; Jonas Mikalcius; Con: Nick Evans	Preview; Report; Report; Report	Try: Simone Favaro; Leonardo Sarto; Pat MacArthur; Con: Rory Clegg

Twickenham Stoop
Referee: Tim Wigglesworth

Harlequins: 15. Aaron Morris 14. Ross Chisholm 13. Joe Marchant 12. Jamie Roberts 11. Tim Visser 10. Nick Evans 9. Danny Care (C)
1. Joe Marler 2. Rob Buchanan 3. Kyle Sinckler 4. Sam Twomey 5. James Horwill 6. Chris Robshaw 7. Luke Wallace 8. Jack Clifford
Replacements from Dave Ward, Cameron Holenstein, Will Collier, George Merrick, Charlie Matthews, Mat Luamanu, Charlie Mulchrone,
Ruaridh Jackson, Jonas Mikalcius, Winston Stanley, James Chisholm
Glasgow Warriors: 15. Fraser Lyle 14. Leonardo Sarto 13. Nick Grigg 12. Sam Johnson 11. Rory Hughes 10. Rory Clegg 9. Grayson Hart
1. Ryan Grant 2. James Malcolm 3. D'Arcy Rae 4. Tim Swinson 5. Scott Cummings 6. Rob Harley (C) 7. Simone Favarro 8. Lewis Wynne
Replacements (all used): Alex Dunbar, Ali Price, Callum Hunter-Hill, Djustice Sears-Duru, Hagen Schulte, Junior Bulumakau, Pat MacArthur, Richie Vernon, Tjiuee Uanivi and Zander Fagerson.

26 August 2016
7.45pm

(England) Gloucester Rugby	33 - 19	(Scotland) Glasgow Warriors
Try: Matt Scott; Greig Laidlaw; Tom Marshall; Callum Braley; Elliott Creed; Con: Greig Laidlaw x 2 James Hook x 2	Preview; Report; Report; Report	Try: Alex Dunbar; Peter Horne; Sean Lamont; Con: Henry Pyrgos; Rory Clegg

Kingsholm Stadium
Attendance: 8231
Referee: T. Foley

Gloucester: 15. Tom Marshall, 14. Charlie Sharples, 13. Matt Scott, 12. Billy Twelvetrees, 11. Henry Purdy, 10. Billy Burns, 9. Greig Laidlaw (C)
1.Yann Thomas, 2. Richard Hibbard, 3. John Afoa, 4. Joe Latta, 5. Mariano Galarza, 6. Ross Moriarty, 7. Matt Kvesic, 8. Ben Morgan
Replacements from Darren Dawidiuk, Paddy McAllister, Paul Doran-Jones; Tom Denton; Lewis Ludlow, Callum Braley, James Hook; Mark Atkinson, Alex Craig, Dan Thomas, Andy Symons, Gareth Evans, Elliott Creed, Lloyd Evans, David Halaifonua, Charlie Beckett
Glasgow Warriors: 15. Rory Hughes. 14. Leonardo Sarto, 13. Alex Dunbar, 12. Sam Johnson, 11. Sean Lamont, 10. Peter Horne
9. Henry Pyrgos (C), 1. Gordon Reid, 2. Corey Flynn, 3. Zander Fagerson, 4. Greg Peterson, 5. Scott Cummings, 6. Rob Harley,
7. Fraser Brown, 8. Ryan Wilson
Replacements: (used:) Ryan Grant, Pat MacArthur, Sila Puafisi, Tim Swinson, Tjiuee Uanivi, Simone Favaro, Lewis Wynne, Ali Price, Rory Clegg, Richie Vernon, Fraser Lyle, (unused:) D'Arcy Rae, Grayson Hart

30 August 2016
7.35pm

(Scotland) Glasgow Warriors	63 - 0	Canada A
Try: Nemia Kenatale; Nick Grigg; James Malcolm; George Horne x 2 Matt Fagerson; Cameron Fenton; Josh Henderson; Patrick Kelly; Con: Hagen Schulte x 5 George Horne x 4	Preview; Preview; Report; Report

Bridgehaugh Park, Stirling
Attendance: 1719
Referee: B Whitehouse (Wales)

Glasgow Warriors: Peter Murchie (C), Junior Bulumakau (Robert Beattie, 41), Nick Grigg (Patrick Kelly*, 44), Fraser Lyle (Patrick Kelly*, 41–43), Lee Jones (rep:Rory Hughes, 41); Hagen Schulte (Josh Henderson*, 61), Nemia Kenatale (George Horne*, 7); Alex Allan (Rep: Jamie Bhatti, 49), James Malcolm (Cameron Fenton*, 41), D'Arcy Rae (Jarrod Firth, 49), Sam Thomson, Greg Peterson (Kiran McDonald, 49), Callum Hunter-Hill* (Shaun MacDonald, 41), Matt Fagerson*, Peter McCallum (Alex Taylor, 41). [* Member of the BT Sport Scottish Rugby Academy]
Canada A: J Wilson-Ross (James Bay D Joyce, Dublin University, 68); K Lloyd (Mississauga Blues), M Samson (Calgary Saints, D Fraser, Ladysmith, 55), P Parfrey (Swilers), D Moor (Balmy Beach, S Hayward, Sydney, 68); R Povey (Bedford, G du Toit, UVIC Vikes, 30), G McRorie (Calgary Hornets, A McMullan, Sainte-Anne-de-Bellevue, 70); D Sears-Duru (Glasgow Warriors, A Luca, Burnaby Lake, 61), E Howard (Brantford Harlequins, A Mascott, UBC Thunderbirds, 38–41), R Kotlewski (Calgary Saints, C McClary, Port Alberni, 57), C Keys (UVic Vikes), K Baillie (Ohio, A Wadden, Oakville Crusaders, 63), A Cejvanovic (Burnaby Lake), N Dala (Castaway Wanderers, M Heaton, Darlington Mowden Park, 49), T Larsen.

=== Pro12 ===
The Pro12 began with an away match at defending champions Connacht, the club which had taken the title from them the previous season. The Warriors were eager for the match, and secured a try bonus victory at Galway Sportgrounds; Peter Horne later said, "I think that really told when we finally played them in the first game of the season and hammered them. It was frustration about why we hadn't been able to do it at the end of last year."

The next match, against Leinster, saw Tommy Seymour run in four tries in another five-point victory for the Warriors. This set up an intriguing away match with Cardiff Blues, another team which started well. The Blues saw out a tight match, and the Warriors only managed a losing bonus point.

Finn Russell, back from his freak injury in the end-of-season match against Connacht, started against Ulster. Again, the Warriors contented themselves with a losing bonus point.

An away win against Newport Gwent Dragons and two bonus-point wins against the Italian sides Treviso and Zebre put the Warriors in a good place before the Autumn Internationals, when they lost fifteen players to the national team. Another three Warriors were also asked to train with the Scotland squad: Ali Price, Nick Grigg and Rory Hughes. Four international players (Simone Favaro, Nemia Kenatale, Djustice Sears-Duru and Langilangi Haupeakui) were called up for their respective countries before Sila Puafisi was called up to play for Tonga. A rapidly-growing injury list which sidelined Leonardo Sarto, Richie Vernon, Ryan Grant, Adam Ashe, Greg Peterson, Scott Cummings, Tjiuee Uanivi and Chris Fusaro also tested the Warriors' depth. They lost both of their Autumn International matches, against the Scarlets and the Ospreys. The run of defeats continued with a one-point loss to Munster at the start of December.

Over the winter period, with the international players returning, the Warriors again began winning matches. A healthy lead in the first leg of the 1872 Cup against Edinburgh led to wins against Treviso and Cardiff.

In the Six Nations window, the Warriors provided most of the Scotland national team. Strength and depth again became an issue; three successive losses to Scarlets, Ulster and Ospreys left Glasgow Warriors trailing those teams battling in the play-off hunt.

The international players returned, and the Warriors' results improved. Wins against Newport Gwent Dragons, Connacht and Zebre were a belated challenge for a top-four place, but losses to Munster and Leinster ended Glasgow's play-off hopes.

The Leinster defeat, on 28 April 2017, cost the Warriors its record as the only team which had qualified for a top-four place every year since the Pro12 began in 2011–12. The match, at the RDS Arena in Dublin, was strange; the match was topsy-turvy, with Leinster initially leading before the Warriors took control. Leinster edged ahead with a penalty, and then the stadium lights went out. It looked like the Dublin side would win the match with the abandonment rule, but the referee waited; about 20 minutes later, the lights came back on and Leinster saw out the remainder of the match.

The final Pro12 match was the second leg of the 1872 Cup against Edinburgh Rugby at Scotstoun Stadium. Glasgow was eager to return the cup back to the west after Edinburgh had won it two seasons before. Although Edinburgh won the match (their first 1872 Cup victory in Glasgow), they could not overturn the margin which the Warriors had built up in the away match at Murrayfield Stadium. The Warriors' seventh 1872 Cup win was bittersweet, as it was Gregor Townsend's last match with the Glasgow side.

2016–17 Pro12
	Team	P	W	D	L	PF	PA	PD	TF	TA	Try bonus	Losing bonus	Pts
1	(Ireland) Munster (RU)	22	19	0	3	602	316	+286	77	34	9	1	86
2	(Ireland) Leinster (SF)	22	18	0	4	674	390	+284	91	47	12	1	85
3	(Wales) Scarlets (CH)	22	17	0	5	537	359	+178	66	40	9	0	77
4	(Wales) Ospreys (SF)	22	14	0	8	556	360	+196	74	42	10	3	69
5	(Ireland) Ulster	22	14	1	7	521	371	+150	68	47	6	4	68
6	(Scotland) Glasgow Warriors	22	11	0	11	540	464	+76	72	53	9	5	58
7	(Wales) Cardiff Blues	22	11	1	10	508	498	+10	59	60	3	4	53
8	(Ireland) Connacht	22	9	0	13	413	498	−85	47	61	5	3	44
9	(Scotland) Edinburgh	22	6	0	16	400	491	−91	46	59	1	6	31
10	(Italy) Benetton Treviso	22	5	0	17	316	664	−348	35	92	1	2	23
11	(Wales) Newport Gwent Dragons	22	4	0	18	368	569	−201	38	71	1	6	23
12	(Italy) Zebre	22	3	0	19	318	773	−455	38	105	1	6	19
If teams are level at any stage, tiebreakers are applied in the following order: 1. number of matches won; 2. the difference between points for and points against; 3. the number of tries scored; 4. the most points scored; 5. the difference between tries for and tries against; 6. the fewest red cards received; 7. the fewest yellow cards received.
Green background (rows 1 to 4) are play-off places and earn a place in the 2017–18 European Rugby Champions Cup. Blue background indicates teams outside the play-off places that earn a place in the European Rugby Champions Cup. Yellow background advances to a play-off for a chance to compete in the Champions Cup. (Q) indicates team has qualified for the play-offs and has qualified for the 2017–18 European Rugby Champions Cup.

==== Results ====
3 September 2016
17:15

Connacht (Ireland)	5 - 41	(Scotland) Glasgow Warriors (1 BP)
Try: Adeolokun 32' m	Preview; Report; Report; Report	Try: Seymour (2) 10' m, 36' m Hogg 45' c Swinson 52' c Puafisi 58' c Lamont 70' c Con: Pyrgos (3/5); Rory Clegg (1/1); Pen: Pyrgos (1/1) 24'

Galway Sportsgrounds
Attendance: 6,063
Referee: Ian Davies (Wales)

10 September 2016
15:00

(1 BP) Glasgow Warriors (Scotland)	33–25	(Ireland) Leinster
Try: Seymour (4) 15' m, 53' c, 55' c, 73' c Swinson 31' c Con: Pyrgos (4/5) 31', 53', 55', 73'	Preview; Report; Report; Report	Try: R. Kearney 25' c van der Flier 37' c Kirchner 41' m Con: Carbery (2/3) 25', 37'; Pen: Carbery (2/2) 44', 63'

Scotstoun Stadium
Attendance: 7,251
Referee: John Lacey (IRFU)

16 September 2016
19:00

Cardiff Blues (Wales)	23–19	(Scotland) Glasgow Warriors (1 BP)
Try: Cuthbert 23' c Lee-Lo 40' c Con: Anscombe (2/2); Pen: Anscombe (2/2) 2', 13'; Shingler (1/1) 77'	Preview; Report; Report; Report	Try: Hogg 26' c Horne 32' c Price 48' m Con: Clegg (2/3)

BT Sport Cardiff Arms Park
Attendance: 8,024
Referee: George Clancy (IRFU)

23 September 2016
19:35

(1 BP) Glasgow Warriors (Scotland)	17–22	(Ireland) Ulster
Try: Reid 19' c Seymour 57' c Con: Russell (2/2) 19', 57'; Pen: Russell (1/1) 48'	Preview; Report; Report; Report	Try: Cave 16' m Penalty try 39' c Jackson 62' c Con: Jackson (2/3) 39', 62'; Pen: Jackson (1/1) 6'

Scotstoun Stadium
Attendance: 7,351
Referee: Ian Davies (WRU)

30 September 2016
19:35

Newport Gwent Dragons (Wales)	17–26	(Scotland) Glasgow Warriors
Try: Hobbs 42' c Dixon 47' c Con: Macleod (2/2); Pen: Macleod (1/2) 33'	Preview; Report; Report; Report	Try: Flynn 28' c Allan 50' c Con: Russell (2/2); Pen: Russell (4/4) 9', 25', 35', 78'

Rodney Parade
Attendance: 4,809
Referee: Andrew Brace (IRFU)

8 October 2016
17:05

(1 BP) Zebre (Italy)	28–33	(Scotland) Glasgow Warriors (1 BP)
Try: Fabiani 29' m Venditti 55' c van Schalkwyk 74' c Con: Canna (2/3) 55', 74'; Pen: Canna (3/3) 2', 18', 80'	Preview; Report; Report; Report	Try: S. Lamont (2) 7' m, 46' c Brown 39' c Sarto 52' m Con: Clegg (2/4) 39', 46'; Pen: Clegg (3/3) 25', 27', 79'

Stadio Sergio Lanfranchi
Attendance: 2,001
Referee: Lloyd Linton (SRU)

28 October 2016
19:35

(1 BP) Glasgow Warriors (Scotland)	31-14	(Italy) Benetton Treviso
Try: Gray 9' c Bennett 13'; Hughes 28' c, 47'; Dunbar 39' c Con: Russell (3/5) 9', 29', 40'	Preview; Report; Report; Report	Try: Penalty try 24' c Giazzon 64' c Con: McKinley (1/1) 24'; Allan (1/1) 65'

Scotstoun Stadium
Attendance: 7,251
Referee: David Wilkinson (IRFU)

5 November 2016
19:35

Scarlets (Wales)	27–3	(Scotland) Glasgow Warriors
Try: Boyde 15' c, 52' c Evans 41' c Con: Patchell (3/3) 16', 42', 54'; Pen: Patchell (2/2) 49', 56'	Preview; Report; Report; Report	Pen: Horne (1/3) 32'

Parc y Scarlets
Attendance: 6,059
Referee: Gary Conway (IRFU)

25 November 2016
19:35

Glasgow Warriors (Scotland)	5-22	(Wales) Ospreys (1 BP)
Try: Bulumakau 78' m	Preview; Report; Report; Report	Try: Habberfield 36' m O'Flaherty 49' m Baker 52' m Beck 67' c Con: Matavesi (1/4) 68'

Scotstoun Stadium
Attendance: 7,166
Referee: George Clancy (IRFU)

2 December 2016
19:35

(1 BP) Glasgow Warriors (Scotland)	15–16	(Ireland) Munster
Try: Price 60' c Nick Grigg 69' m Con: Clegg (1/2) 61'; Pen: Horne (1/2) 15'	Preview; Report; Report; Report	Try: Conway; Con: Keatley (1/1) 12'; Pen: Keatley (2/3) 8', 36'; Drop: Keatley (1/1) 76'

Scotstoun Stadium
Attendance: 7,351
Referee: Nigel Owens (WRU)

- 1872 Cup 1st leg

26 December 2016
16:05

Edinburgh (Scotland)	12–25	(Scotland) Glasgow Warriors
Pen: Weir (4/4) 7', 22', 52', 59'	Preview; Report; Report; Report	Try: Bulumakau 1' m Strauss 33' c Dunbar 66' c Con: Russell (2/3) 34', 67'; Pen: Russell (1/2) 40'; Drop: Russell (1/1) 56'

Murrayfield Stadium
Attendance: 21,036
Referee: Ian Davies (WRU)

31 December 2016
14:00

(1 BP) Benetton Treviso (Italy)	28-35	(Scotland) Glasgow Warriors (1 BP)
Try: Sperandio 1' m Budd (2) 32' c, 73' c Con: Allan (1/2) 32'; McKinley (1/1) 74'; Pen: Allan (2/4) 40', 48'; McKinley (1/2) 61'	Preview; Report; Report; Report	Try: Hogg 16' c Seymour 18' c Ashe 29' c Gigg 51' c Clegg 76' c Con: Hogg (5/5) 17', 19', 30', 52', 77'

Stadio Comunale di Monigo
Referee: Elio Rizzo (FIR)

7 January 2017
19:35

(1 BP) Glasgow Warriors (Scotland)	29–15	(Wales) Cardiff Blues
Try: MacArthur 12' c Murchie (2) 48' c, 55' c Malcolm 64' m Con: Russell (3/4) 13', 49', 56'; Pen: Russell (1/1) 34'	Preview; Report; Report; Report	Try: Scully 38' c R. Williams 77' m Con: Shingler (1/2) 40'; Pen: Shingler (1/1) 42'

Scotstoun Stadium
Attendance: 7,251
Referee: Andrew Brace (IRFU)

10 February 2017
19:35

Glasgow Warriors (Scotland)	14 - 26	(Wales) Scarlets
Try: MacArthur 15' m Pen: Clegg (3/3) 2', 26', 48'	Preview; Report; Report; Report	Try: Williams 21' c Davies 38' c Con: Williams 23'; Jones 40'; Pen: Jones 6', 29', 54'; Thomas 75'

Scotstoun Stadium
Attendance: 7,166
Referee: George Clancy (IRFU)

18 February 2017
15:00

(1 BP) Ulster (Ireland)	37-17	(Scotland) Glasgow Warriors
Try: Pienaar 52' m Bowe 21' m Reidy 30' c Stockdale 48' c, 77' c Con: Pienaar (3/5) 32', 48', 78'; Pen: Pienaar (2/2) 10', 44'	Preview; Report; Report; Report	Try: Thomson 39' m Cummings (2) 68' m, 73' c Con: Thomson (1/3) 73'

Kingspan Stadium
Attendance: 16,545
Referee: Daniel Jones

26 February 2017
17:05

(1 BP) Ospreys (Wales)	26-15	(Scotland) Glasgow Warriors
Try: Giles 9' c Matavesi 21' c Ardron 55' c Fonotia 55' m Con: Price (3/4) 10', 22', 55'	Preview; Report; Report; Report	Try: Flynn 24' c Murchie 55' m Con: Thomson (1/2) 55'; Pen: Thomson 46'

Liberty Stadium
Attendance: 7,140
Referee: Frank Murphy

4 March 2017
15:00

(1BP) Glasgow Warriors (Scotland)	47 - 17	(Wales) Newport Gwent Dragons
Try: Grigg 28' c, 36' c Hughes 42' c Tagive 49' m Jones 57' c Bennett 66' c Horne 74' c Con: Horne (6/7) 29', 37', 43', 51', 58', 75'	Preview; Report; Report; Report	Try: Landman 22' c Morgan 80+2' c Con: O'Brien (1/1/) 23'; Jones 80+2'; Pen: O'Brien 14'

Scotstoun Stadium
Attendance: 7,096
Referee: Andrew Brace (Ireland)

25 March 2017
17:15

(1 BP) Glasgow Warriors (Scotland)	35–24	(Ireland) Connacht
Try: Flynn 11' c Russell 49' c Price 54' c Lamont 77' m Con: Russell (3/3) 12', 50', 54'; Pen: Russell (2/2) 7', 36'; P. Horne (1/1) 74'	Preview; Report; Report; Report	Try: Adeolokun 4' m Muldoon 29' c Con: Ronaldson (1/2) 30'; Pen: Ronaldson (3/4) 19', 48', 66'; J. Cooney (1/1) 76'

Scotstoun Stadium
Attendance: 7,251
Referee: Ian Davies (WRU)

8 April 2017
19:35

Munster (Ireland)	10–7	(Scotland) Glasgow Warriors (1 BP)
Try: Cronin 4' c Con: Bleyendaal (1/1) 5'; Pen: R. Scannell (1/1) 60'	Preview; Report; Report; Report	Try: Hogg 68' c Con: Russell (1/1) 69'

Irish Independent Park
Attendance: 8,008
Referee: Nigel Owens (WRU)

14 April 2017
19:35

(1 BP) Glasgow Warriors (Scotland)	45–10	(Italy) Zebre
Try: Grigg 10' c Murchie 18' c Harley 26' c Fagerson 29' c Johnson 59' c Smith (2) 62' m, 74' m Con: P. Horne (5/5) 11', 19', 27', 30', 60'	Preview; Report; Report; Report	Try: Van Zyl 66' m Baker 78' m

Scotstoun Stadium
Attendance: 7,351
Referee: David Wilkinson (IRFU)

28 April 2017
19:35

(1 BP) Leinster (Ireland)	31–30	(Scotland) Glasgow Warriors (1 BP)
Try: Ryan 5' c O'Loughlin 9' m Dooley 35' m Kirchner 59' m Con: R. Byrne (1/4) 6'; Pen: R. Byrne (2/2) 31', 41'+1; Carbery (1/1) 75'	Preview; Report; Report; Report	Try: Ashe 46' c Jones 65' c Russell 70' c Con: Horne (1/1) 47'; Russell (2/2) 66', 71'; Pen: Horne (3/3) 3', 26', 57'

RDS Arena
Attendance: 12,975
Referee: Marius Mitrea (FIR)

- 1872 Cup 2nd leg

6 May 2017
17:15

Glasgow Warriors (Scotland)	18–29	(Scotland) Edinburgh
Try: Gray 40' m Hogg 65' c Con: Russell (1/2) 65'; Pen: Russell (2/2) 2', 18'	Preview; Report report Report	Try: Hoyland 56' c Bryce 80' c Con: Weir (2/2) 58', 80'+1; Pen: Weir (5/5) 7', 14', 33', 43', 53'

Scotstoun Stadium
Referee: Mike Adamson (SRU)

The Warriors won the 1872 Cup with an aggregate score of 43–41.

=== Europe ===
The Warriors were placed in Pool 1 of the European Champions Cup. They were drawn against the previous year's finalists Racing 92 and past winners Munster and Leicester Tigers. Since it had been announced that this would be Gregor Townsend's last season with the Warriors, a huge focus for the season would be for Glasgow to get out of the pool stages and qualify for a quarter-final.

Glasgow's previous best in the Heineken Cup was a quarter-final play-off in 1997, when they lost to Leicester Tigers. This season's Tigers were first up in the pool stage.

The match at Scotstoun was a 42–13 victory for the Warriors, with the Glasgow side running in five tries. The untimely death of Munster coach Anthony Foley postponed Munster's match with Racing 92, and Munster's next match would be against the Warriors at an emotionally-charged Thomond Park. Foley's death seemed to galvanise the Munster side, and they were 38–17 victors in a difficult match.

A tough doubleheader against last year's finalists was next for the Warriors. Racing 92 had New Zealand fly-half Dan Carter and former Glasgow Warrior favourite Leone Nakarawa in their ranks; Glasgow side crushed the French side in Paris, however, with Townsend describing the victory as the second-best of his Warriors coaching career (after the 2014-15 Pro12 final against Munster).

A home tie proved the Paris result no fluke, as another special night at Scotstoun saw the Warriors dominate Racing. In particular, Finn Russell's outplaying of Dan Carter in back-to-back matches thrust the Scotland fly-half into Lions contention. Townsend said, "Finn deserved to be in the Lions conversation before the games against Racing but he’s playing with lots of confidence and parts of his game have got really strong over the last couple of years. Finn’s been up against Dan Carter and a lot of other big players in big environments, too. He’s started at Scotland at stand-off for the last two-and-a-half years so even though British & Irish rugby is full of quality players, I expect him to be in the mix."

An emboldened Munster came to Scotstoun and ground out a three-point win. The last Pool 1 game for Glasgow was at Welford Road in Leicester. The Warriors went to Leicester with purpose, and gave the Tigers their worst result in European history. The Tigers failed to score, and Glasgow ran in six tries for a 43–0 victory. By the end of the match, the Warriors pushed for 50 points in the Tigers' 22. Leicester's Freddie Burns was tackled, and the ball about to be turned over when Burns reached out for the touchline to end the match and avoid another Warriors score. The Warriors were the first Scottish team to defeat Leicester at home since the Fettesian-Lorettonian Club managed it 112 years before, when they won by a try to nil on 28 December 1905 with Jobson scoring the three points.

The Warriors qualified for a European Champions Cup quarter-final for the first time in their history. They drew Saracens away and, as the European champions, Sarries were heavy favourites. Still 6,000 Warriors fans went to London, however, and provided the Aviva Premiership team with their largest home attendance at Allianz Park. The first half was tighter than expected; a few attempted tries by Saracens were ruled out for infringements, but the London club led. Warriors captain Jonny Gray was taken off injured; returning from injury in his first game back, Greg Peterson tried to cover Gray's absence.

The second half began well for the Warriors, and a try by Lee Jones brought a period of Warriors dominance. A missed kick to touch by Finn Russell to consolidate Warrior pressure into a lead was the turning point of the match, however, and the Saracens began running in tries. A consolation try at the end by Ryan Wilson was the Warriors' only reply.

Townsend later blamed himself for the defeat, saying that he had over-analysed the Saracens and prevented Glagow from playing their own game: "Nothing might have worked, because Saracens are so good, but I got it wrong". Despite the loss, the Warrior Nation made many friends and Glasgow were now firmly on the European rugby map. Saracens would go on to the European Champions title, again defeating Clermont in the final at Murrayfield Stadium.

Team	P	W	D	L	PF	PA	Diff	TF	TA	TB	LB	Pts
(Ireland) Munster (2)	6	5	0	1	160	64	+96	18	4	3	1	24
(Scotland) Glasgow Warriors (6)	6	4	0	2	160	86	+74	18	10	2	1	19
(England) Leicester Tigers	6	2	0	4	61	190	–129	3	23	0	0	8
(France) Racing 92	6	1	0	5	89	130	–41	12	14	1	0	5

==== Results ====
14 October 2016
19:45

(1 BP) Glasgow Warriors (Scotland)	42–13	(England) Leicester Tigers
Try: Sarto (2) 24' c, 76' c Brown 28' c Pyrgos 33' m Bennett 68' c Con: Russell (4/5) 24', 28', 68', 76'; Pen: Hogg (1/1) 14'; Russell (2/2) 55', 67'	Preview; Report; Report; Report	Try: Thompstone 20' c Con: O. Williams (1/1) 20'; Pen: O. Williams (2/2) 8', 37'

Scotstoun Stadium
Attendance: 7,351
Referee: Mathieu Raynal (FFR)

22 October 2016
13:00

(1 BP) Munster (Ireland)	38–17	(Scotland) Glasgow Warriors
Try: Bleyendaal 4' c Taute 14' c Zebo 30' c Penalty try 47' c Scannell 75' c Con: Bleyendaal (4/4) 4', 14', 30', 47'; Keatley (1/1) 75'; Pen: Bleyendaal (1/1) 7'	Preview; Report; Report; Report	Try: MacArthur 66' c Bennett 70' c Con: S. Hogg (2/2) 66', 70'; Pen: Russell (1/2) 10'

Thomond Park
Attendance: 25,600
Referee: Jérôme Garcès (FFR)

10 December 2016
16:15

Racing 92 (France)	14–23	(Scotland) Glasgow Warriors
Try: Imhoff 7' c Carter 72' c Con: Carter (2/2) 8', 72'	Preview; Report; Report; Report	Try: Dunbar 29' c Price 41' c Con: Russell (2/2) 30', 42'; Pen: Russell (3/4) 10', 14', 65'

Stade Yves-du-Manoir
Attendance: 8872
Referee: JP Doyle (RFU)

16 December 2016
19:45

Glasgow Warriors (Scotland)	23–7	(France) Racing 92
Try: Strauss 3' m Brown 13' c Price 46' m Con: Russell (1/3) 14'; Pen: Russell (2/2) 29', 38'	Preview; Report; Report; Report	Try: Chauveau 78' c Con: Dambielle (1/1) 79'

Scotstoun Stadium
Attendance: 7351
Referee: George Clancy (IRFU)

14 January 2017
17:30

(1 BP) Glasgow Warriors (Scotland)	12–14	(Ireland) Munster
Pen: Russell (3/3) 13', 47', 59'; Hogg (1/2) 32'	Preview; Report; Report; Report	Try: Saili 71' m Pen: Bleyendaal (3/4) 20', 34', 50'

Scotstoun Stadium
Attendance: 7,351
Referee: Luke Pearce (RFU)

21 January 2017
17:30

Leicester Tigers (England)	0–43	(Scotland) Glasgow Warriors (1BP)
Pen: Burns (0/2)	Preview; Report; Report; Report	Try: Seymour 5' c Penalty try 21' c Bennett 29' c Gray 35' c Wilson 47' c Swinson 60' m Con: Russell (5/6) 5', 22', 30', 36', 48'; Pen: Russell (1/2) 12'

Welford Road
Attendance: 19,345
Referee: Mathieu Raynal (FFR)

2 April 2017
13:00

Saracens (England) (3)	38–13	(6) (Scotland) Glasgow Warriors
Try: Ashton (2) 31' m, 78' c Bosch 59' c Barritt 73' c Con: Farrell (3/4) 59', 73', 78'; Pen: Farrell (4/4) 9', 15', 27', 70'	Preview; Report; Report; Report	Try: Jones 48' m Wilson 80' m Pen: Russell (1/1) 11'

Allianz Park
Attendance: 15,000
Referee: Jérôme Garcès (FFR)

== Warrior of the Month awards ==
Award	Winner
September	(Scotland) Tommy Seymour
October	(Scotland) Rory Hughes
November	(Scotland) Lewis Wynne
December	(Scotland) Ali Price
January	(Scotland) Tim Swinson
February	(Scotland) Scott Cummings
March	(Samoa) Brian Alainu'uese
April	(Scotland) Nick Grigg
May	None

== End-of-season awards ==
Award	Winner
Young Player of the Season	(Scotland) Scott Cummings
Coaches Award	(Scotland) Rob Harley & (Scotland) Peter Horne
Test Player of the Season	(Scotland) Stuart Hogg
Most Improved Player of the Season	(Samoa) Brian Alainu'uese
Al Kellock Leadership Award	(Scotland) Peter Murchie
Community Club of the Season	East Kilbride
Try of the Season	(Scotland) Josh Strauss vs. (France) Racing 92
Players' Player of the Season	(Scotland) Nick Grigg
Player of the Season	(Scotland) Ali Price

== Competitive debuts ==
A player's nationality is taken from the nationality at the highest honour for the national side obtained or, if never capped internationally, their place of birth. Senior caps take precedence over junior caps or place of birth; junior caps take precedence over place of birth. A player's nationality at debut may be different from the nationality shown. Combination sides, such as the British and Irish Lions or Pacific Islanders, are not national sides or nationalities.

Players in BOLD have been capped by their senior international XV side as nationality shown.

Players in Italics have been capped by their international 7s side or by the international XV 'A' side as nationality shown.

Players in normal font have not been capped at senior level.

A position in parentheses indicates that the player debuted as a substitute. A player may have made a prior debut for Glasgow Warriors in a non-competitive, 'A', or 7s match; these matches are not listed.

Tournaments where competitive debut was made:

**Scottish Inter-District Championship**	**Welsh–Scottish League**	**WRU Challenge Cup**	**Celtic League**	**Celtic Cup**	**1872 Cup**	**Pro12**	**Pro14**	**Rainbow Cup**	**United Rugby Championship**	**European Challenge Cup**	**Heineken Cup / European Champions Cup**

Number	Player nationality	Name	Position	Date of debut	Venue	Stadium	Opposition nationality	Opposition side	Tournament	Match result	Scoring debut
263	(Italy)	**Leonardo Sarto**	Wing	2016-09-03	Away	Galway Sportsgrounds	(Ireland)	Connacht	Pro12	Win	Nil
264	(Namibia)	**Tjiuee Uanivi**	(Lock)	2016-09-03	Away	Galway Sportsgrounds	(Ireland)	Connacht	Pro12	Win	Nil
265	(Scotland)	Lewis Wynne	(Flanker)	2016-09-03	Away	Galway Sportsgrounds	(Ireland)	Connacht	Pro12	Win	Nil
266	(New Zealand)	**Corey Flynn**	(Hooker)	2016-09-03	Away	Galway Sportsgrounds	(Ireland)	Connacht	Pro12	Win	Nil
267	(Scotland)	Sam Thomson	(Lock)	2016-09-23	Home	Scotstoun Stadium	(Ireland)	Ulster	Pro12	Loss	Nil
268	(Scotland)	**Matt Fagerson**	(No. 8)	2016-09-23	Home	Scotstoun Stadium	(Ireland)	Ulster	Pro12	Loss	Nil
269	(Canada)	**Djustice Sears-Duru**	(Prop)	2016-09-30	Away	Rodney Parade	(Wales)	Dragons	Pro12	Win	Nil
270	(Scotland)	Rob McAlpine	(Lock)	2016-09-30	Away	Rodney Parade	(Wales)	Dragons	Pro12	Win	Nil
271	(Scotland)	Callum Hunter-Hill	(Lock)	2016-10-08	Away	Stadio Sergio Lanfranchi	(Italy)	Zebre	Pro12	Win	Nil
272	(Samoa)	Brian Alainu'uese	(Lock)	2016-10-28	Home	Scotstoun Stadium	(Italy)	Benetton Treviso	Pro12	Win	Nil
273	(United States)	**Langilangi Haupeakui**	(Flanker)	2016-10-28	Home	Scotstoun Stadium	(Italy)	Benetton Treviso	Pro12	Win	Nil
274	(Scotland)	**Jamie Bhatti**	(Prop)	2016-11-05	Away	Parc y Scarlets	(Wales)	Scarlets	Pro12	Loss	Nil
275	(Scotland)	Adam Nicol	(Prop)	2016-11-25	Home	Scotstoun Stadium	(Wales)	Ospreys	Pro12	Loss	Nil
276	(Scotland)	**George Horne**	(Scrum half)	2016-11-25	Home	Scotstoun Stadium	(Wales)	Ospreys	Pro12	Loss	Nil
277	(Scotland)	Paddy Kelly	(Centre)	2016-11-25	Home	Scotstoun Stadium	(Wales)	Ospreys	Pro12	Loss	Nil
278	(Fiji)	**Nemia Kenatale**	(Scrum half)	2016-11-25	Away	Stadio Comunale di Monigo	(Italy)	Benetton Treviso	Pro12	Win	Nil
279	(Germany)	**Hagen Schulte**	(Fly half)	2017-02-10	Home	Scotstoun Stadium	(Wales)	Scarlets	Pro12	Loss	Nil
280	(South Africa)	Brandon Thomson	Full back	2017-02-18	Home	Scotstoun Stadium	(Ireland)	Ulster	Pro12	Loss	7 pts
281	(Scotland)	Matt Smith	Flanker	2017-02-26	Away	Liberty Stadium	(Wales)	Ospreys	Pro12	Loss	Nil
282	(Australia)	Ratu Tagive	(Wing)	2017-02-26	Away	Liberty Stadium	(Wales)	Ospreys	Pro12	Loss	Nil

== Sponsors ==
- BT Sport: Title sponsor
- Scottish Power: kit and community sponsor

Kit supplier: Macron

Kit sponsors:

- Malcolm Group
- McCrea Financial Services
- Denholm Oilfield
- Ross Hall Hospital
- Story Contracting

Other sponsors:

- The Famous Grouse
- Clyde Travel Management
- Harper Macleod
- Caledonia Best
- Eden Mill Brewery and Distillery
- David Lloyd Leisure
- Crabbie's
- Cala Homes
- Capital Solutions
- Martha's Restaurant

Partners:

- Barrs
- Glasgow Airport
- Cameron House
- People Make Glasgow
- Smile Plus
- Lucozade Sport
- Lenco Utilities
- HF Group
- Scot JCB News Scotland
- G4S
- MSC Nutrition
- Healthspan Elite
- Primestaff
- The Crafty Pig
- Village Hotel Club
- Land Rover
