= 2015–16 Scottish Rugby Academy season =

Scottish Rugby Academy 2015 / 2016

The Scottish Rugby Academy provides Scotland's up and coming rugby stars a dedicated focused routeway for development into the professional game. Entry is restricted to Scottish qualified students and both male and female entrants are accepted into 4 regional academies. The 2015–16 season sees the first year of the academy.

== Season overview ==
This was the founding year of the Scottish Rugby Academy.

== Regional Academies ==
The Scottish Rugby Academy runs four regional academies in Scotland:- Glasgow and the West, Borders and East Lothian, Edinburgh and Caledonia. These roughly correspond to the traditional districts of Glasgow District, South, Edinburgh District and North and Midlands.

== Players and Stages ==
Players are selected in three stages:- Stage 1 - Regionally selected and regionally supported players; Stage 2 - Nationally selected and regionally supported players; and Stage 3 - Nationally selected and regionally supported players.

=== Stage 3 players ===
Stage 3 players are assigned to a professional team. Nominally, for the men, Glasgow Warriors receive the Stage 3 players of Glasgow and the West and Caledonia regions, while Edinburgh Rugby receive the Stage 3 players of the Edinburgh and Borders and East Lothian regions. The women are integrated into the Scotland women's national rugby sevens team and the Scotland women's national rugby union team.

==== Borders and East Lothian ====
Note: Flags indicate national union under World Rugby eligibility rules. Players may hold more than one non-World Rugby nationality.

| Player | Position | Union |
|---|---|---|
| Gary Robertson | Prop | Scotland |
| Ross Graham | Hooker | Scotland |
| Lewis Carmichael | Lock | Scotland |

| Player | Position | Union |
|---|---|---|
| Tom Galbraith | Centre | Scotland |
| George Taylor | Centre | Scotland |

==== Caledonia ====
Note: Flags indicate national union under World Rugby eligibility rules. Players may hold more than one non-World Rugby nationality.

| Player | Position | Union |
|---|---|---|
| Murray McCallum | Prop | Scotland |
| Bruce Flockhart | Flanker | Scotland |
| Lewis Wynne | Flanker | Scotland |

==== Edinburgh ====
Note: Flags indicate national union under World Rugby eligibility rules. Players may hold more than one non-World Rugby nationality.

| Player | Position | Union |
|---|---|---|
| Jack Cosgrove | Prop | Scotland |
| Grant McConnell | Prop | Scotland |
| Jake Kerr | Hooker | Scotland |
| Ally Miller | Flanker | Scotland |

| Player | Position | Union |
|---|---|---|
| Hugh Fraser | Scrum-half | Scotland |
| Ruairi Howarth | Outside-half | Scotland |
| Ben Robbins | Fullback | Scotland |

==== Glasgow and the West ====
Note: Flags indicate national union under World Rugby eligibility rules. Players may hold more than one non-World Rugby nationality.

| Player | Position | Union |
|---|---|---|
| Cameron Fenton | Hooker | Scotland |
| James Malcolm | Hooker | Scotland |
| Scott Cummings | Lock | Scotland |
| Andrew Davidson | Lock | Scotland |
| Callum Hunter-Hill | Lock | Scotland |
| Kiran McDonald | Lock | Scotland |
| Michael Dewar | Flanker | Scotland |
| Matt Smith | Flanker | Scotland |

| Player | Position | Union |
|---|---|---|
| George Horne | Scrum-half | Scotland |
| Robbie Fergusson | Centre | Scotland |
| Nick Grigg | Centre | Scotland |
| Patrick Kelly | Centre | Scotland |

=== Stage 1 and Stage 2 players ===
The inductees into the 2015–16 season are split into their regional academies.

==== Borders and East Lothian ====
- Stephen Ainslie Stage 2 Currie RFC (Number Eight)
- Harry Borthwick Stage 2 Melrose RFC (Locks)
- Darcy Graham Stage 2 Hawick RFC (Full-back)
- Andrew Grant-Suttie Stage 2 North Berwick RFC (Openside flanker)
- Finn Hobbis Stage 2 North Berwick RFC (Prop)
- Andrew Horne Stage 2 Preston Lodge RFC (Blindside flanker)
- Grant Huggan Stage 2 Hawick RFC) (Stand-off
- Craig Pringle Stage 2 Melrose RFC (Centre)
- Fraser Renwick Stage 2 Hawick RFC (Hooker)
- Chloe Rollie Stage 2 Melrose Ladies RFC (Full-back)
- Daniel Suddon Stage 2 Hawick RFC (Locks)
- Lisa Thomson Stage 2 Melrose Ladies RFC (Centre)

==== Caledonia ====
- Kaleem Barreto Stage 2 Glenalmond College (Scrum-half)
- Callum Cruickshank Stage 2 Dollar Academy (Number Eight)
- Matt Emmison Stage 2 Aberdeenshire RFC (Hooker)
- Ben Enyon Stage 2 Strathallan School (Wing)
- Matt Fagerson Stage 2 Strathallan School (Blindside flanker)
- Ewan Fox Stage 2 High School of Dundee (Scrum-half)
- George Goodenough Stage 2 Ellon RFC (Stand-off)
- Caitlan Harvey Stage 2 Caithness RFC (Wing)
- Josh Henderson Stage 2 Glasgow Hawks RFC (Stand-off)
- Megan Kennedy Stage 2 Stirling County RFC (Prop)
- Duncan Leese Stage 2 Dundee HSFP (Centre)
- Lewis McLean Stage 2 Strathallan School (Prop)
- Mark New Stage 2 Strathallan School (Centre)
- Adam Nicol Stage 2 Dunfermline RFC (Prop)
- Lucy Park Stage 2 Murrayfield Wanderers RFC (Openside flanker)
- Bruce Sorbie Stage 2 Aberdeenshire RFC (Full-back)
- Emma Wassell Stage 2 Murrayfield Wanderers RFC (Locks)

==== Edinburgh ====
- Ben Appleson Stage 2 The Edinburgh Academy (Full-back)
- Hamish Bain Stage 2 Currie RFC (Locks)
- Luke Crosbie Stage 2 Currie RFC (Blindside flanker)
- Katie Dougan Stage 2 RHC Cougars RFC (Prop)
- Ross Dunbar Stage 2 Stirling County RFC (Prop)
- Fin Field Stage 2 Edinburgh University RFC (Locks)
- Thomas Gordon Stage 2 Currie RFC (Openside flanker)
- Ali Greig Stage 2 Stewart's Melville RFC (Wing)
- Mhairi Grieve Stage 2 RHC Cougars RFC (Scrum-half)
- Fergus Haig Stage 2 Fettes College (Openside flanker)
- Sarah Law Stage 2 Murrayfield Wanderers RFC (Scrum-half)
- Lisa Martin Stage 2 Murrayfield Wanderers RFC (Stand-off)
- Ross McCann Stage 2 Royal High School (Wing)
- Lisa Robertson Stage 2 Murrayfield Wanderers RFC (Prop)
- Charlie Shiel Stage 2 Currie RFC (Scrum-half)
- Eilidh Sinclair Stage 2 Murrayfield Wanderers RFC (Wing)
- Aaron Tait Stage 2 Merchiston Castle School (Scrum-half)

=== Glasgow and the West ===
- Paul Cairncross Stage 2 East Kilbride RFC (Hooker)
- Rachael Cook Stage 2 Murrayfield Wanderers RFC (Blindside flanker)
- Calum Gaw Stage 2 Ayr RFC (Centre)
- Martin Hughes Stage 2 St. Aloysius College RFC (Blindside flanker)
- Jade Konkel Stage 2 Hillhead Jordanhill RFC (Number Eight)
- Charlie Lonergan Stage 2 GHA RFC (Centre)
- Louise McMillan Stage 2 Hillhead Jordanhill RFC (Blindside flanker)
- Gregor Paxton Stage 2 Ayr RFC (Centre)
- Paul Ramsey Stage 2 Glasgow Hawks RFC (Wing)
- Archie Russell Stage 2 Ayr RFC (Centre)
- Andrew Simpson Stage 2 Currie RFC (Number Eight)
- Lana Skeldon Stage 2 Hillhead Jordanhill RFC (Hooker)
- Robbie Smith Stage 2 Newton Stewart RFC (Hooker)

== Graduates of this year ==
Players who have signed professional contracts with clubs:

- Andrew Davidson to (England) Newcastle Falcons
- Lewis Carmichael to (Scotland) Edinburgh Rugby
- Jack Cosgrove to (Scotland) Edinburgh Rugby
- Ross Graham to (England) Yorkshire Carnegie
- Robbie Fergusson to (England) London Scottish F.C.
- Scott Cummings to (Scotland) Glasgow Warriors
- Ali Price to (Scotland) Glasgow Warriors
- James Malcolm to (Scotland) Glasgow Warriors
- Nick Grigg to (Scotland) Glasgow Warriors
