= 2016–17 Scottish Rugby Academy season =

Scottish Rugby Academy 2016 / 2017

The Scottish Rugby Academy provides Scotland's up and coming rugby stars a dedicated focused routeway for development into the professional game. Entry is restricted to Scottish qualified students and both male and female entrants are accepted into 4 regional academies. The 2016–17 season sees the second year of the academy.

== Season overview ==
This was the second year of the Scottish Rugby Academy

== Regional Academies ==
The Scottish Rugby Academy runs four regional academies in Scotland:- Glasgow and the West, Borders and East Lothian, Edinburgh and Caledonia. These roughly correspond to the traditional districts of Glasgow District, South, Edinburgh District and North and Midlands.

== Players and Stages ==
Players are selected in three stages:- Stage 1 - Regionally selected and regionally supported players; Stage 2 - Nationally selected and regionally supported players; and Stage 3 - Nationally selected and regionally supported players assigned to a professional team.

=== Stage 3 players ===
Stage 3 players are assigned to a professional team. Nominally, for the men, Glasgow Warriors receive the Stage 3 players of Glasgow and the West and Caledonia regions, while Edinburgh Rugby receive the Stage 3 players of the Edinburgh and Borders and East Lothian regions. The women are integrated into the Scotland women's national rugby sevens team and the Scotland women's national rugby union team.

This season some of the Stage 3 players were additionally loaned out to London Scottish for their development.

==== Borders and East Lothian ====
Note: Flags indicate national union under World Rugby eligibility rules. Players may hold more than one non-World Rugby nationality.

Player / Position / Union; Gary Robertson / Prop / Scotland	Player / Position / Union; Darcy Graham / Wing / Scotland

==== Caledonia ====
No Stage 3 players selected.

==== Edinburgh ====
Note: Flags indicate national union under World Rugby eligibility rules. Players may hold more than one non-World Rugby nationality.

Player	Position	Union
Murray McCallum	Prop	Scotland
Daniel Winning	Prop	Scotland
Thomas Gordon	Flanker	Scotland
Luke Crosbie	Flanker	Scotland

Player	Position	Union
Charlie Shiel	Scrum-half	Scotland
Jason Baggott	Fly-half	Scotland
Cammy Hutchison	Centre	Scotland
George Taylor	Centre	Scotland
Ross McCann	Wing	Scotland
Grant McConnell	Wing	Scotland

==== Glasgow and the West ====
Note: Flags indicate national union under World Rugby eligibility rules. Players may hold more than one non-World Rugby nationality.

Player	Position	Union
Jamie Bhatti	Prop	Scotland
Callum Hunter-Hill	Lock	Scotland
Sam Thomson	Lock	Scotland
Bruce Flockhart	Flanker	Scotland
Matt Smith	Flanker	Scotland
Lewis Wynne	Flanker	Scotland
Matt Fagerson	Number 8	Scotland
Jade Konkel	Number 8	Scotland

Player	Position	Union
George Horne	Scrum-half	Scotland
Robert Beattie	Wing	Scotland

==== London Scottish ====
London Scottish is a SRU member and a professional club playing in the 2016–17 RFU Championship. The SRU has a partnership agreement with London Scottish for a player development pathway. Although these Stage 3 players are nominally assigned to Glasgow Warriors or Edinburgh Rugby these academy players have then been loaned out to the Exiles side for development.

Note: Flags indicate national union under World Rugby eligibility rules. Players may hold more than one non-World Rugby nationality.

Player	Position	Union
Cameron Fenton	Hooker	Scotland
Ally Miller	Number 8	Scotland

Player	Position	Union
Hugh Fraser	Scrum-half	Scotland
Tom Galbraith	Centre	Scotland
Patrick Kelly	Wing	Scotland
Ben Robbins	Wing	Scotland

=== Stage 1 and 2 players ===
The inductees into the 2016–17 season are split into their regional academies.

==== Borders and East Lothian ====
- Patrick Anderson Stage 1/2 Melrose RFC
- Harry Borthwick Stage 1/2 Melrose RFC (Lock)
- Thomas Brown Stage 1/2 Melrose RFC
- Kyle Brunton Stage 1/2 Hawick RFC
- Rory Darge Stage 1/2 North Berwick RFC
- Roan Frostwick Stage 1/2 North Berwick RFC
- Adam Hall Stage 1/2 Melrose RFC
- Andrew Horne Stage 1/2 Preston Lodge RFC (Blindside flanker)
- Robbie McCallum Stage 1/2 Loretto School
- Gary Munro Stage 1/2 Jed-Forest RFC
- Fraser Renwick Stage 1/2 Hawick RFC
- Finlay Scott Stage 1/2 Jed Thistle RFC

==== Caledonia ====
- Kaleem Barreto Stage 1/2 Glenalmond College (Scrum-half)
- Fergus Bradbury Stage 1/2 Stirling University
- Callum Cruickshank Stage 1/2 Dollar Academy (Number Eight)
- Karen Dunbar Stage 1/2 RHC Cougars
- Angus Fraser Stage 1/2 High School of Dundee
- George Goodenough Stage 1/2 Strathallan School (Stand-off)
- Caitlan Harvey Stage 1/2 Caithness RFC (Wing)
- Grant Hughes Stage 1/2 Dollar Academy
- Megan Kennedy Stage 1/2 Stirling County (Prop)
- Euan McLaren Stage 1/2 Dollar Academy
- Andrew McLean Stage 1/2 Stirling County
- Lucy Park Stage 1/2 Murrayfield Wanderers RFC (Openside flanker)
- Logan Trotter Stage 1/2 Stirling County
- Emma Wassell Stage 1/2 Murrayfield Wanderers RFC (Lock)

==== Edinburgh ====
- Ben Appleson Stage 1/2 Edinburgh Academicals (Full-back)
- Hamish Bain Stage 1/2 Currie RFC (Lock)
- Jack Bruce Stage 1/2 Edinburgh Academicals
- Ross Dunbar Stage 1/2 Stirling County (Prop)
- Calum Eastwood Stage 1/2 Watsonians
- Jordan Edmunds Stage 1/2 Boroughmuir RFC
- Ewan Fox Stage 1/2 High School of Dundee
- Fin Hobbis Stage 1/2 Stewarts Melville
- Jamie Hodgson Stage 1/2 Stewarts Melville
- Sarah Law Stage 1/2 Murrayfield Wanderers RFC (Scrum-half)
- Rhona Lloyd Stage 1/2 Edinburgh University
- Helen Nelson Stage 1/2 Murrayfield Wanderers RFC
- Dan Marek Stage 1/2 Currie RFC
- Lisa Martin Stage 1/2 Murrayfield Wanderers RFC
- Dean Roger Stage 1/2 Edinburgh Academicals
- Chloe Rollie Stage 1/2 Murrayfield Wanderers RFC
- Eilidh Sinclair Stage 1/2 Murrayfield Wanderers RFC (Wing)
- Lisa Thomson Stage 1/2 Edinburgh University
- Jamie Ure Stage 1/2 Boroughmuir RFC

==== Glasgow and the West ====
- Scott Bell Stage 1/2 Glasgow Hawks
- Paul Cairncross Stage 1/2 East Kilbride RFC (Hooker)
- Rachael Cook Stage 1/2 Murrayfield Wanderers RFC (Blindside flanker)
- Ben Eynon Stage 1/2 Glasgow Hawks
- Andrew Grant-Suttie Stage 1/2 Stirling County
- Fergus Haig Stage 1/2 GHA
- Josh Henderson Stage 1/2 Glasgow Hawks
- Martin Hughes Stage 1/2 Heriots (Blindside flanker)
- Ross Jackson Stage 1/2 Biggar RFC
- Andrew Jardine Stage 1/2 Biggar RFC
- Stafford McDowell Stage 1/2 Ayr RFC
- Louise McMillan Stage 1/2 Hillhead Jordanhill RFC
- Mark New Stage 1/2 Glasgow Hawks
- Craig Pringle Stage 1/2 Stirling County
- Robbie Smith Stage 1/2 Newton Stewart RFC (Hooker)
- Bruce Sorbie Stage 1/2 Stirling County
- Gavin Wilson Stage 1/2 Dumfries Saints
- Dan York Stage 1/2 West of Scotland

== Graduates of this year ==
Players who have signed professional contracts with clubs:

- Matt Smith to (Scotland) Glasgow Warriors
- Lewis Wynne to (Scotland) Glasgow Warriors
- Jamie Bhatti to (Scotland) Glasgow Warriors
- Murray McCallum to (Scotland) Edinburgh Rugby
- Ally Miller to (Scotland) Edinburgh Rugby
- Darcy Graham to (Scotland) Edinburgh Rugby
- George Horne to (Scotland) Glasgow Warriors
- Patrick Kelly to (Scotland) Glasgow Warriors
- Hugh Fraser to (Scotland) Edinburgh Rugby
- Tom Galbraith to (Scotland) Edinburgh Rugby
- Callum Hunter-Hill to (Scotland) Edinburgh Rugby
