= Kaleem Barreto =

Portuguese/Scottish rugby union player

- Born: Kaleem Barreto; 19 December 1998 (age 27) Portugal
- Height: 5 ft 8 in (1.73 m)
- Weight: 81 kg (12 st 11 lb)
- School: Glenalmond College

Rugby union career
- Position: Scrum-half, Wing
Amateur team(s)
Years	Team	Apps	(Points)
- Perthshire
-2017	Dundee HSFP		
2017-18	Marr		
2018-19	Glasgow Hawks	15	(5)
2019-20	→Stade Niçois		
Senior career
Years	Team	Apps	(Points)
2017-18	Glasgow Warriors	7	
Provincial / State sides
Years	Team	Apps	(Points)
2019-	Boroughmuir Bears	53	(79)
International career
Years	Team	Apps	(Points)
- Scotland U16
- Portugal U19
2018	Scotland U20	1	(0)
National sevens team
Years	Team		Comps
2019–	Scotland 7s		9 (100)
Medal record
Men's rugby sevens
Representing Great Britain
European Games
Silver medal – second place	2023 Kraków–Małopolska	Team competition

Kaleem Barreto (born 19 December 1998) is a Scotland 7s professional international rugby union player. He was previously a Stage 3 Scottish Rugby Academy player assigned to Glasgow Warriors; and has also played for Stade Niçois. His usual position is at the Scrum-half position, though he can also play on the Wing.

== Rugby Union career ==
=== Amateur career ===
Born in Portugal, to a Mozambique father and Scottish mother, Barreto moved to Scotland with his family, at the age of 3.

Barreto played rugby for Glenalmond College. He then moved to play for Perthshire.

He was enrolled in the Scottish Rugby Academy in season 2015-16 in the Caledonia regional academy as a Stage 2 player. He has played for the Caledonia U16 team.

The following season, 2016-17, he remained a Stage 2 player but graduated to Stage 3 for the 2017–18 season.

Barreto played for Dundee HSFP.

On 7 July 2017 it was announced that Barreto had signed for Marr, for their first season in the BT Premiership. Barreto played for Marr when not in use by Glasgow Warriors.

He was signed by Glasgow Hawks for the season 2018–19.

He signed for Stade Niçois on loan on 10 August 2019. Stade Niçois confirmed he left the French side on 13 June 2020 to rejoin the Scotland 7s squad.

=== Professional career ===
Barreto is enrolled in the BT Sport Scottish Rugby Academy as a Stage 3 player. Stage 3 players are aligned to a professional club and given regional support. Assigned to Glasgow Warriors, Baretto is determined to win a professional contract with the club: "It doesn’t matter where or how I play my rugby this season. All I know is that I want to end the season with my first professional contract with Glasgow."

He made his competitive debut for the Warriors away against the Ospreys in the Pro14 on 26 November 2017. He came on as a replacement and helped set up a try for Brandon Thomson in a 7 try demolition of the Welsh side.

=== International career ===
Barreto has played for Scotland U16 and Scotland U19.

He played his first Scotland U20 match against Wales U20 in 2018.

He previously trained with the Scotland 7s side. Barreto said: "Sevens is great to develop your skills and a few players have showed that you can have a very good season on the circuit and then get a contract. That’s what George Horne and Jamie Farndale did so that could be a way into professional rugby."

"If it doesn’t come off, I’ll go back to Glasgow and probably play for Marr in the Premiership. Both Marr and the Sevens circuit will be good for me regardless, so I’ll just give my whole to whoever picks me and hope that’s enough to secure that contract I’ve been dreaming about."

He was capped by the Scotland 7s team in May 2019 - and scored a try for Scotland against Japan 7s in the Paris Sevens. He competed at the 2022 Rugby World Cup Sevens in Cape Town.

== Cricket career ==
Barreto has represented Scotland U15s at cricket and played for Dundee HSFP cricket club.
