= Lindsay Renwick =

Scotland international rugby union player

- Born: William Lindsay Renwick; 24 December 1960 (age 65) Hawick, Scotland

Rugby union career
- Position: Wing
Amateur team(s)
Years	Team	Apps	(Points)
- Stirling County
–	London Scottish		
–	Sale		
Provincial / State sides
Years	Team	Apps	(Points)
- Scottish Exiles
1986	Combined Scottish Districts		
International career
Years	Team	Apps	(Points)
1987-89	Scotland 'B'	4	(0)
1989	Scotland	1	(0)
Coaching career
- Years: Team
- 2015: North Berwick (Asst.)

Lindsay Renwick (born 24 December 1960) is a former Scotland international rugby union player.

== Rugby Union career ==
=== Amateur career ===
He started with Stirling County.

He then played for London Scottish.

He also played for Sale.

=== Provincial career ===
Renwick was capped by Scottish Exiles in the Scottish Inter-District Championship.

He played for Combined Scottish Districts on 1 March 1986 against South of Scotland, coming on as a replacement for Scott Hastings.

=== International career ===
Renwick was capped for Scotland 'B' 4 times between 1987 and 1989.

He earned a solitary full senior cap for Scotland, playing against Romania on the 9 December 1989.

=== Coaching career ===
He was an Assistant Coach at North Berwick in 2015.

== Business career ==
He is now a non-executive director at Enjoy Leisure in East Lothian; and the Head of Customer Operations for Edinburgh Leisure.
