= Sam Thomson (rugby union) =

Scottish rugby union player

- Born: Samuel Wallace Thomson; 23 January 1994 (age 32) Edinburgh, Scotland
- Height: 1.98 m (6 ft 6 in)
- Weight: 115 kg (18 st 2 lb)
- School: Kelvinside Academy
- University: Worcester University

Rugby union career
- Position: Lock
Amateur team(s)
Years	Team	Apps	(Points)
2011–2014	Lydney RFC		
2015	Southbridge Rugby Club		
2016–2017	Glasgow Hawks		
Senior career
Years	Team	Apps	(Points)
2015–2016	Perpignan	23	(25)
2016–2017	Glasgow Warriors	1	(0)
2017–2019	Warringah	50	(5)
2017	Greater Sydney Rams	5	(0)
2018	NSW Country	3	(0)
2019-2020	Edinburgh	8	(0)
2020-2021	Toshiba Brave Lupus	4	(0)
2022	Kintetsu Liners	1	(0)
- Correct as of 26 August 2019

Sam Thomson (born 23 January 1994) is a Scottish rugby union player. He currently plays in Japan for Toshiba Brave Lupus in the Top League competition. His usual position is at lock.

== Early life and career ==
Born in Edinburgh, Scotland, Thomson was raised in Glasgow where he attended Kelvinside Academy. He represented Glasgow District at U15, U16 and U17 age grades.

He moved south to England where he played with Lydney RFC and attended the University of Worcester. He utilised the training link that the university had with Worcester Warriors, and also played for the Scottish Exiles U18s while based in England.

Thomson then moved to New Zealand for six months where he played for Southbridge Rugby Club, an amateur club in the Canterbury Rugby Football Union, famous for being Dan Carter's first club.

== Rugby career ==
=== France ===
In the 2015–16 season Thomson signed for Perpignan to play in their academy. He played in the Espoir competition for the French side but never played in the Pro D2.

=== Scotland ===
Thomson enrolled in the BT Sport Scottish Rugby Academy in 2016–17 as a Stage 3 player. Stage 3 players are assigned to a professional club and Thomson has been assigned to Glasgow Warriors for the 2016–17 season. When not on Warriors duty, he played for Glasgow Hawks.

Thomson made his debut for the Warriors in the pre-season match against Canada 'A' on 30 August 2016. He made his Pro12 debut for the Warriors against Ulster on 23 September 2016 when he replaced Tjiuee Uanivi. After sustaining a shoulder injury in late 2016 that ended his season, he moved to Australia.

=== Australia ===
Joining the Warringah Rats on Sydney's Northern Beaches, Thomson played in the club's Shute Shield premiership-winning team of 2017. He played in the National Rugby Championship for the Greater Sydney Rams in 2017 NSW Country in 2018, and Sydney in 2019.

=== Japan ===
On 14 September 2020, Thomson makes move to Japan with Toshiba Brave Lupus on the Top League competition ahead of the 2020–21 season.

== Life outside rugby ==
Thomson studied an outdoor leadership-based degree at Worcester University. He is a qualified canoe/kayak instructor, has passed mountain leader training and is white water safety and rescue qualified. After his rugby career finishes, Sam Thomson wants to join his father Bill Thomson—who played rugby for Scottish colleges—into the events, hospitality and tourism industry.
