= Matt Smith (rugby union, born 1996) =

Scottish rugby union player

- Born: Matthew Cameron Smith; 5 October 1996 (age 30) Scotland
- Height: 6 ft 1 in (1.85 m)
- Weight: 104 kg (16 st 5 lb)
- School: Stirling High School
- Notable relative: Alex Smith (Great grandfather)

Rugby union career
- Position: Flanker
Amateur team(s)
Years	Team	Apps	(Points)
2014–15	Stirling County		
2015–16	Glasgow Hawks		
2021-	Glasgow High Kelvinside		
Senior career
Years	Team	Apps	(Points)
2014-20	Glasgow Warriors	25	(15)
2020	→Edinburgh		

| rep_update = }}

Matthew Cameron Smith (born 5 October 1996 in Scotland) is a Scottish rugby union player who plays for Glasgow High Kelvinside. He previously played for Glasgow Warriors and Edinburgh Rugby at the Flanker position.

== Rugby Union career ==
=== Amateur career ===
Smith was part of the Stirling County youth set-up. He won man of the match in the National Youth League Cup final when Stirling Country won the tournament in 2013. They had previously won the same tournament in 2011 and 2012.

In 2015-16 season, Smith moved to play for Glasgow Hawks. Smith has been drafted to Glasgow Hawks in the Scottish Premiership for the 2017-18 season.

In 2021, Smith played for Glasgow High Kelvinside.

=== Professional career ===
The flanker secured an Elite Development Programme place with Glasgow Warriors for the 2014–15 season. This meant he could continue playing for Stirling County whilst training with the Warriors.

The following season he was named as a Scottish Rugby Academy Stage 3 player. Stage 3 players are assigned to a professional team; and once again Smith was assigned to Glasgow Warriors for 2015-16.

In 2016-17 season Smith once again was classed as a Warriors player. He was promoted out the academy on 19 December 2016 by Glasgow Warriors earning a contract for a year and a half.

On 7 February 2020 Smith was loaned to Edinburgh Rugby for the remainder of the season.

In June 2020, following a period of reflection during the suspension of rugby during the COVID-19 pandemic, Matt took the decision to retire from playing professional rugby. He announced the decision on Twitter.

=== International career ===
Smith was capped by Scotland U20s against France in 2015. He was called up to Scotland's squad for the 2019 Six Nations Championship.

== Family ==
His sister, Hannah, has played representative rugby for Scotland. His great grandfather, Alex Smith, played association football for Rangers and Dunfermline Athletic.
