= Matt Fagerson =

Scottish international rugby union player (born 1998)

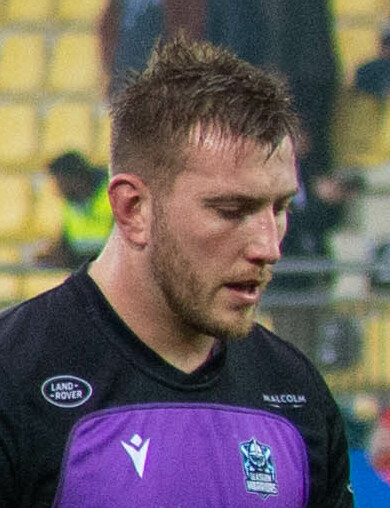
- Fagerson representing Glasgow Warriors during the United Rugby Championship
- Full name: Matthew Joseph Fagerson
- Born: 16 July 1998 (age 28) Perth, Scotland
- Height: 1.86 m (6 ft 1 in)
- Weight: 110 kg (243 lb; 17 st 5 lb)
- School: High School of Dundee; Strathallan School
- Notable relative: Zander Fagerson (brother)

Rugby union career
- Position(s): Number 8, Flanker
- Current team: Glasgow Warriors
Senior career
Years	Team	Apps	(Points)
2016–	Glasgow Warriors	105	(100)
- Correct as of 16 March 2024
International career
Years	Team	Apps	(Points)
2017	Scotland U20	8	(10)
2018	Scotland 7s	2	(5)
2018–	Scotland	68	(30)
2022	Scotland 'A'	1	(0)
- Correct as of 18 November 2026

Matthew Joseph Fagerson (born 16 July 1998) is a Scottish professional rugby union player who plays as a number eight for United Rugby Championship club Glasgow Warriors and the Scotland national team.

== Early life ==
Fagerson played for the great Dundee Eagles at junior rugby level. Fagerson attended the High School of Dundee and Strathallan School and played for the Caledonia U18 district side.

When not on Warriors duty, Fagerson plays for Glasgow Hawks.

== Club career ==
Fagerson enrolled in the BT Sport Scottish Rugby Academy in 2015-16 as a Stage 2 player. In 2016-17 he was promoted to Stage 3 earning a full time professional contract with the academy. Stage 3 players are assigned to a professional club and Fagerson has been assigned to Glasgow Warriors for the 2016-17 season.

Fagerson made his debut for the Warriors in the pre-season match against Canada 'A' on 30 August 2016. In a 63–0 win for the Warriors, Fagerson scored a try on his debut.

Fagerson made his Pro12 debut for the Warriors against Ulster on 23 September 2016 when he replaced Ryan Wilson.

Fagerson signed a professional contract with the Warriors on 28 September 2017, turning professional on 1 October 2017. The contract runs for two and a half years meaning that Fagerson has committed to the club until at least 2020.

== International career ==
Fagerson has represented Scotland Under 16s and Scotland Under 18s.

Fagerson gained his first senior cap for Scotland on 16 June 2018 when playing against the United States.

He was capped by Scotland 'A' on 25 June 2022 in their match against Chile.

In 2023 Fagerson, and his brother, were selected in Scotland's 33 player squad for the 2023 Rugby World Cup in France.

== Personal life ==
He is the younger brother of Scotland international rugby union player Zander Fagerson.

== Career statistics ==
=== List of international tries ===
No.	Date	Venue	Opponent	Score	Result	Competition
1	9 July 2022	Estadio Padre Ernesto Martearena, Salta, Argentina	Argentina	20–6	29–6	2022 mid-year rugby union tests
2	11 February 2023	Murrayfield Stadium, Edinburgh, Scotland	Wales	33–7	35–7	2023 Six Nations Championship
3	30 September 2023	Stade Pierre-Mauroy, Lille, France	Romania	33–0	84–0	2023 Rugby World Cup
4	12 July 2024	Audi Field, Washington DC, United States of America	United States	40–7	42–7	2024 mid-year rugby union tests
5	11 July 2026	Loftus Versfeld Stadium, Pretoria, South Africa	South Africa	5-14	28-42	Nations Championship
6	15 November 2026	Murrayfield Stadium, Edinburgh, Scotland	Australia	10-5	15-12	Nations Championship

as of 19 November 2026

Awards and achievements
Previous: Magnus Bradbury	Sir Willie Purves Quaich; 2018	Next: Darcy Graham
