= Adam Nicol =

Scottish rugby union player

- Born: Adam Scott Nicol; 2 July 1997 (age 29) Aberdeen, Scotland
- Height: 6 ft 1 in (1.85 m)
- Weight: 120 kg (18 st 13 lb)
- School: Queen Anne High School, Dunfermline
- University: Glasgow University

Rugby union career
- Position: Tighthead Prop
Amateur team(s)
Years	Team	Apps	(Points)
- Dunfermline
–	Glasgow University		
–	Glasgow Hawks		
–	Stirling County		
Senior career
Years	Team	Apps	(Points)
2016 - 21	Glasgow Warriors	18	(0)
2021 - 23	Jersey Reds	19	(10)
2023 - 24	Coventry	13	(0)
2024 -	Ealing Trailfinders	4	(0)
International career
Years	Team	Apps	(Points)
- Scotland U16
	Scotland U18	5	(0)
2015-17	Scotland U20	10	(0)

Adam Nicol (born 2 July 1997 in Aberdeen, Scotland) is a former Scotland U20 international rugby union player who plays for Ealing Trailfinders Rugby Club. at the Tighthead Prop position. He previously played for Glasgow Warriors and Stirling County, Jersey Reds and Coventry.

== Rugby Union career ==
=== Amateur career ===
Nicol grew up in Bermuda and started at the Bermuda Youth Rugby Program, representing Bermuda as a school boy V Cayman in 2008. On return to Scotland he started out with Dunfermline, Nicol moved on to play for Glasgow University, Glasgow Hawks and then Stirling County. He studies Earth Sciences at Glasgow University.

Nicol has been drafted to Stirling County in the Scottish Premiership for the 2018-19 season.

=== Professional career ===
On 25 November 2016, Nicol played for Glasgow Warriors against Ospreys in the Pro12, replacing D'Arcy Rae at Tighthead Prop. He became Glasgow Warrior No. 275.

He was enrolled in the Scottish Rugby Academy for their 2017-18 intake as a Stage 3 player. Stage 3 players are assigned a professional club; Nicol was assigned to Glasgow Warriors.

He played again for Glasgow Warriors in their opening match of the 2017-18 season - against Northampton Saints at Bridgehaugh Park, Stirling on 19 August 2017. He made 18 competitive appearances for the club.

On 9 April 2021 it was announced that he had joined Jersey Reds with immediate effect. The deal is initially a loan to the end of the season, but the move will be made permanent thereafter.

=== International career ===
Nicol was picked for Scotland at U16 level.

He then moved up in his international career with Scotland at Under 18 level, playing against England in Match 2015.

He received his first Scotland U20 cap against England in the Under 20 Six Nations of 2016.
