= Thomas Gordon (rugby union) =

Scottish rugby union player

- Born: Thomas Gordon; 30 January 1997 (age 29) Rotorua, New Zealand
- Height: 5 ft 11 in (1.80 m)
- Weight: 102 kg (16 st 1 lb)

Rugby union career
- Position: Flanker
Amateur team(s)
Years	Team	Apps	(Points)
2015-2016	Currie		
Senior career
Years	Team	Apps	(Points)
2016-2018	Edinburgh	0	(0)
2018-2024	Glasgow Warriors	76	(60)
2024–	Newcastle Falcons	39	(5)
- Correct as of 13 August 2025
International career
Years	Team	Apps	(Points)
- Scotland U20
2018-	Scotland Club XV		

Thomas Gordon (born 30 January 1997) is a Scottish professional rugby union player who plays for Newcastle Falcons in the Premiership Rugby competition.

== Rugby Union career ==
=== Amateur career ===
Gordon plays for Currie Chieftains.

Gordon secured a Stage 2 place in the Scottish Rugby Academy in the 2015–16 season.

=== Professional career ===
The flanker secured a Scottish Rugby Academy Stage 3 place with Edinburgh for the 2016–17 Scottish Rugby Academy season.

On 9 July 2018 it was announced that Gordon had signed a professional deal with Glasgow Warriors. This was a year long partnership contract which meant that Gordon could still play for Currie when not in use by the Warriors.

Gordon made his first appearance for the Warriors in their 50 -17 demolition of Harlequins at North Inch, Perth on 18 August 2018.

Gordon made his competitive Glasgow Warriors debut in the Pro14 match against Ospreys at Scotstoun Stadium on 25 January 2019. The Warriors won the match 9-3.

On 28 June 2024, Gordon would join English side Newcastle Falcons on a two-year deal in the Premiership Rugby from the 2024-25 season.

=== International career ===
New Zealand-born Gordon, 21, qualifies for Scotland through his grandparents and has been capped at Scotland U20s. He has also been capped for Scotland Club XV. Gordon received his first call up to the senior Scotland squad on 15 January 2020 for the 2020 Six Nations Championship.
