= Brandon Thomson =

South African rugby union player

- Full name: Brandon Terry Thomson
- Born: 7 March 1995 (age 31) Trichardt, South Africa
- Height: 1.87 m (6 ft 1 1/2 in)
- Weight: 92 kg (14 st 7 lb; 203 lb)
- School: Hoërskool Ermelo, Ermelo
- University: University of South Africa

Rugby union career
- Position: Fly-half
- Current team: Rovigo Delta
Youth career
- 2012–2013: Pumas
- 2014–2017: Western Province
Amateur team(s)
Years	Team	Apps	(Points)
2015	Maties	7	(24)
2017	Stirling County		
2017–2018	Ayr		
2018–2019	Stirling County		
2019	Stirling County	2	(5)
Senior career
Years	Team	Apps	(Points)
2016–2017	Stormers	7	(26)
2016–2017	Western Province	16	(107)
2017	→ Glasgow Warriors	3	(12)
2017–2021	Glasgow Warriors	28	(117)
2021–2022	Free State Cheetahs	6	(19)
2021–2022	Cheetahs	0	(0)
2023–2024	Pumas	12	(52)
2024–	Rovigo Delta		
- Correct as of 13 March 2023
International career
Years	Team	Apps	(Points)
2013	South Africa Schools	2	(10)
2015	South Africa Under-20	5	(59)
- Correct as of 18 April 2018

Brandon Terry Thomson (born 7 March 1995) is a South African rugby union player, currently playing with Italian Serie A Elite team Rovigo Delta. His regular position is fly-half.

== Rugby union career ==
=== Youth: Pumas and South African Schools ===
As a product of Hoërskool Ermelo, Thomson was called up to represent the Pumas at youth level, representing them at the Under-18 Craven Week – South Africa's premier rugby union competition at high school level – in both 2012 and 2013. He was the joint-sixth top scorer at the 2012 event in Port Elizabeth with 25 points, and the seventh-highest points scorer in the 2013 event in Polokwane with 40 points. After the 2013 tournament, Thomson was also included in a South African Schools side for their annual Under-18 International Series against sides from Europe. He started their match against England and kicked two penalties in a 19–14 victory. He was an unused replacement for their second match against France, but returned to the starting line-up for their final match against Wales, kicking two conversions in a 14–13 victory.

=== Youth: Western Province, Maties and South Africa Under-20 ===
After finishing high school, Thomson moved to the Western Cape to join the Western Province Rugby Institute prior to the 2014 season. He represented the Western Province U19 side during the 2014 Under-19 Provincial Championship, making eight appearances and scoring nine points as the team finished in third position on the log to qualify for the play-offs. He didn't feature in the play-offs, however, where Western Province beat Free State U19 29–22 in the semi-finals and the Blue Bulls U19s 33–26 in the final to win the competition. Thomson also made one appearance for the Western Province U21s in the 2014 Under-21 Provincial Championship, coming on as a replacement in their match against the Sharks U21s.

At the start of 2015, Thomson was included in the Maties squad that played in the 2015 Varsity Cup. He played in all seven of their matches during the competition – scoring 24 points in the process – in a disappointing season for Maties, who missed out on the semi-finals by finishing the season in fifth position.

Shortly after the Varsity Cup, he was selected a 37-man South Africa Under-20 training squad and also started for them in a friendly match, kicking two penalties and a conversion in a 31–24 victory in a friendly match against a Varsity Cup Dream Team at the conclusion of the 2015 Varsity Cup competition. He was named in their squad to tour Argentina for a two-match series as preparation for the 2015 World Rugby Under 20 Championship. He was an unused replacement in their 25–22 victory over Argentina in the first match, but started in their 39–28 win in the second match four days later, scoring two penalties and four conversions for the visitors.

Upon the team's return, he was named in the final squad for the 2015 World Rugby Under 20 Championship. He started all three of their matches in Pool B of the competition and was also the main kicker for South Africa throughout the competition. He kicked three conversions in a 33–5 win against hosts Italy in the opening match, three penalties and two conversions in a 40–8 win against Samoa and two penalties and four conversions in their final match against Australia, also scoring a try in the 55th minute of their 46–13 win. The results meant that South Africa finished top of Pool B to qualify for the semi-finals with the best record in the pool stage of all the teams in the competition. Thomson also started their semi-final match against England, kicking two conversions and two penalties, but couldn't prevent them losing the match 20–28 to be eliminated from the competition by England for the second year in succession. He started their third-place play-off match against France, with his four conversions and one penalty helping South Africa to a 31–18 win to win the bronze medal. He ended the competition as the top scorer in the tournament, with 59 points.

Thomson returned to domestic action in July 2015 to play for the Western Province U21 side in the 2015 Under-21 Provincial Championship Group A. He started six of his side's twelve matches during the regular season of the competition, helping them finish top of the log after winning ten of their matches. He also started in their semi-final match, kicking five conversions and a penalty in a 43–20 victory over the Golden Lions U21, and the final, in which he scored a try and kicked four penalties and four conversions – with a personal points tally of 25 points that also won him the Man of the Match award – as Western Province beat Free State U21 52–17 to win the competition.

In 2016, Thomson was named as a member of Super Rugby team the Stormers' training squad that prepared for the 2016 Super Rugby season.

=== Glasgow Warriors ===
In February 2017, Thomson joined Scottish Pro12 club Glasgow Warriors on a two-month loan deal. He made his Pro 12 debut at fullback in their Round 15 match against Ulster, scoring a try and one conversion in a 17–37 defeat. He has the Warrior No. 280. He started their next match against Ospreys at fly-half, scoring five points with the boot, and came on as a replacement in a 47–17 win over Newport Gwent Dragons.

Thomson also featured for Stirling County in the Scottish Premiership.

On 4 July 2017 it was announced that Thomson would return to the Warriors, after his successful loan period at the end of the 2016-17 season. The fly-half secured a permanent two-year deal starting for the 2017–18 season.

Thomson was drafted to Ayr in the Scottish Premiership for the 2017–18 season.

Thomson has been drafted to Stirling County in the Scottish Premiership for the 2018–19 season.

=== Stirling County ===
Stirling County ran a professional side, as well as an amateur side in 2019-20. This was in the Super 6 league competition, a new professional league run by the SRU. Players could turn out for the Super 6 sides as well as the provincial sides Glasgow Warriors and Edinburgh Rugby. Thomson played for the professional Stirling County side.

=== Cheetahs ===
On 8 February 2021 Thomson signed a deal with the Cheetahs through to 2022.
