= Jamie Bhatti =

Scottish professional rugby union player (born 1993)

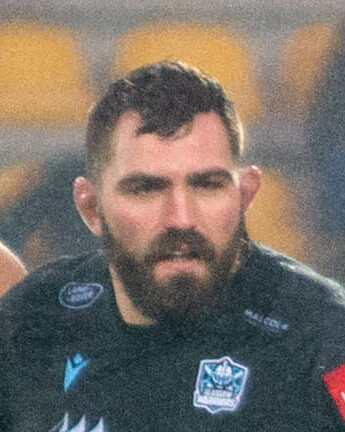
- Bhatti in 2022
- Born: 8 September 1993 (age 33) Stirling, Scotland
- Height: 1.86 m (6 ft 1 in)
- Weight: 120 kg (265 lb; 18 st 13 lb)
- School: Alva Academy
- University: Telford College

Rugby union career
- Position: Prop
- Current team: Bath
Amateur team(s)
Years	Team	Apps	(Points)
- Hillfoots
- Stirling County
2015-17	Melrose		
2018-19	Ayr		
Senior career
Years	Team	Apps	(Points)
2016–19	Glasgow Warriors	47	(0)
2019–20	Edinburgh	17	(0)
2021	Bath	11	(0)
2021–26	Glasgow Warriors	90	(15)
2026–	Bath	0	(0)
International career
Years	Team	Apps	(Points)
2012–13	Scotland U20	17	(5)
2017–	Scotland	36	(5)
2022–	Scotland 'A'	2	(0)

Jamie Bhatti (born 8 September 1993) is a Scotland international rugby union player who plays as a prop for Premiership Rugby club Bath Rugby

== Early life ==
Jamie Bhatti was born in Stirling on 8 September 1993. His name of Indian origin, a result of his paternal grandfather emigrating to Scotland from Ludhiana, India in the 1960s. As a teenager he worked in an abattoir and as a nightclub door steward and applied unsuccessfully to become a police officer before turning professional in rugby.

Bhatti started his youth rugby with Hillfoot Minis before moving on to Stirling County where he came through the age grades of midi and colts before playing for the senior side. He then moved to play for Melrose. He has played for the Caledonia district at Under 17, Under 18 and Under 19 age grades. When not playing for Glasgow Warriors, Bhatti plays for Melrose RFC.

== Club career ==
Bhatti was awarded a place in the Scottish Rugby Academy for season 2016-17. He was a Stage 3 player for Glasgow and the West regional academy. He was drafted to Ayr in the Scottish Premiership for the 2018-19 season.

Bhatti made his debut for Glasgow Warriors on 30 August 2016. He played at Bridgehaugh Park for the Warriors against Canada 'A'.

Bhatti was selected for Scotland's 2018-19 Summer Tour to Canada, America and Argentina.

Ahead of the 2019-20 season, Bhatti moved to the Scottish capital and Glasgow's domestic rivals, Edinburgh Rugby.

In December 2020, Bhatti signed for Premiership Rugby side Bath as injury cover until the end of the season, with Edinburgh granting permission to terminate their contract 6 months early.

On 22 January 2021, it was announced that Bhatti would return to Glasgow Warriors in the Pro14 for a second stint from the 2021-22 season.

The 2023-24 campaign was a significant year in Bhatti's career. The season started with selection for Scotland in the 2023 Rugby World Cup, appearing in two tests against South Africa and Romania.

On returning to club duty, Bhatti chalked up his 100th Glasgow Warriors appearance on February 17th 2024 against Dragons. However, the seasons highlight would prove to be a crowning moment in South Africa, with Glasgow Warriors defying the odds and overcoming Bulls to win the URC title at Loftus Versfeld.

On 17 March 2026, it was announced that Bhatti would re-join reigning English champions Bath on a permanent two-year deal ahead of the 2026-27 season.

== International career ==
Bhatti has represented Scotland at Under 17, Under 18 and Under 19 age grades. He was later capped for Scotland Club XV. Bhatti received his first call up to the senior Scotland squad by coach Gregor Townsend in October 2017 for the Autumn Internationals, appearing as a replacement in all three tests including a historic win over Australia.

He was capped by Scotland 'A' on 25 June 2022 in their match against Chile.

In 2023, Bhatti was selected in the 33 player squad for the 2023 Rugby World Cup in France.

In November 2024 at Murrayfield, he scored his first international try for Scotland against Portugal in the 2024 Autumn Internationals
