= Zander Fagerson =

Scottish rugby union player (born 1966)

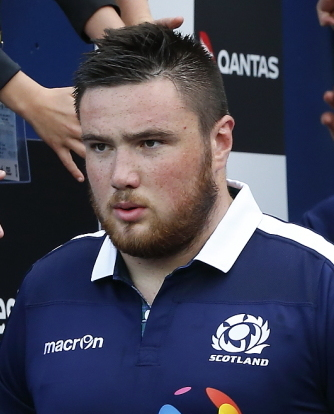
- Fagerson representing Scotland during the Summer Internationals
- Full name: Alexander James Ragnar Fagerson
- Born: 19 January 1996 (age 30) Perth, Scotland
- Height: 1.88 m (6 ft 2 in)
- Weight: 125 kg (276 lb; 19 st 10 lb)
- School: High School of Dundee; Strathallan School
- Notable relative: Matt Fagerson (brother)

Rugby union career
- Position: Tighthead Prop
- Current team: Glasgow Warriors
Senior career
Years	Team	Apps	(Points)
2014–	Glasgow Warriors	160	(55)
- Correct as of 25 February 2025
International career
Years	Team	Apps	(Points)
2014–2016	Scotland U20	19	(10)
2016–	Scotland	87	(15)
2021, 2025	British & Irish Lions	0	(0)
- Correct as of 18 November 2026
Coaching career
- Years: Team
- 2019–: Glasgow High Kelvinside (Assistant Coach)
- Correct as of 13 April 2023

Alexander James Ragnar Fagerson (born 19 January 1996) is a Scottish professional rugby union player who plays as a prop for United Rugby Championship club Glasgow Warriors and the Scotland national team.

== Professional career ==
=== Stirling County ===
Fagerson was drafted to Stirling County in the Scottish Premiership for the 2017-18 season.

=== Glasgow Warriors ===
Fagerson made his debut for Glasgow Warriors in a 40–23 win at Treviso in October 2014 going on to become the youngest player to reach 50 caps for Glasgow Warriors at the age of 21.

=== Scotland ===
Fagerson represented Scotland at under-16, under-18 and under-20.

Fagerson received his first call up to the senior Scotland squad by coach Vern Cotter on 19 January 2016 for the 2016 Six Nations Championship. He made his debut for Scotland as a replacement in the Six Nations match against England at Murrayfield on 6 February 2016.

In 2023 Fagerson and his brother Matt Fagerson were selected in the 33 player squad for the 2023 Rugby World Cup in France.

=== British and Irish Lions ===
In May 2021 Fagerson was selected in the 37-man squad for the 2021 British & Irish Lions tour to South Africa.

Fagerson took to the field for the first tour match against the Sigma Lions at Ellis Park Stadium in Johannesburg, becoming Lion #848.

In May 2025 Fagerson was selected by Head Coach Andy Farrell for the 2025 British & Irish Lions tour to Australia. He was later forced to withdraw from the tour with a calf injury and was replaced by Finlay Bealham.

== Career statistics ==
=== International analysis by opposition ===
Opposition	Played	Win	Loss	Draw	Tries	Points	Win %
Argentina	6	4	2	0	0	0	66.67%
Australia	6	4	2	0	0	0	66.67%
England	6	3	3	0	0	0	50%
Fiji	3	2	1	0	0	0	66.67%
France	10	3	7	0	0	0	30%
Georgia	4	4	0	0	0	0	100%
Ireland	7	1	6	0	0	0	14.29%
Italy	9	8	1	0	2	10	88.89%
Japan	2	1	1	0	1	5	50%
New Zealand	2	0	2	0	0	0	0%
Russia	1	1	0	0	0	0	100%
Samoa	2	2	0	0	0	0	100%
South Africa	3	0	2	0	0	0	0%
Tonga	2	2	0	0	0	0	100%
United States	1	0	1	0	0	0	0%
Wales	6	4	2	0	0	0	66.67%
Career	70	39	31	0	2	10	55.71%

as of 24 November 2024

== Coaching career ==
From the 2019-20 season Fagerson will be an assistant coach at Glasgow High Kelvinside.

== Personal life ==
Outside rugby, Fagerson was Scottish Youth Downhill Mountain Bike Champion in 2010, sang with NYCoS National Boys Choir in 2006 and is a qualified lifeguard.

Fagerson is known affectionately as "Zandbags" amongst Scottish rugby fans due to his love of getting involved in any "afters".
