= Lewis Wynne =

Scottish rugby union player

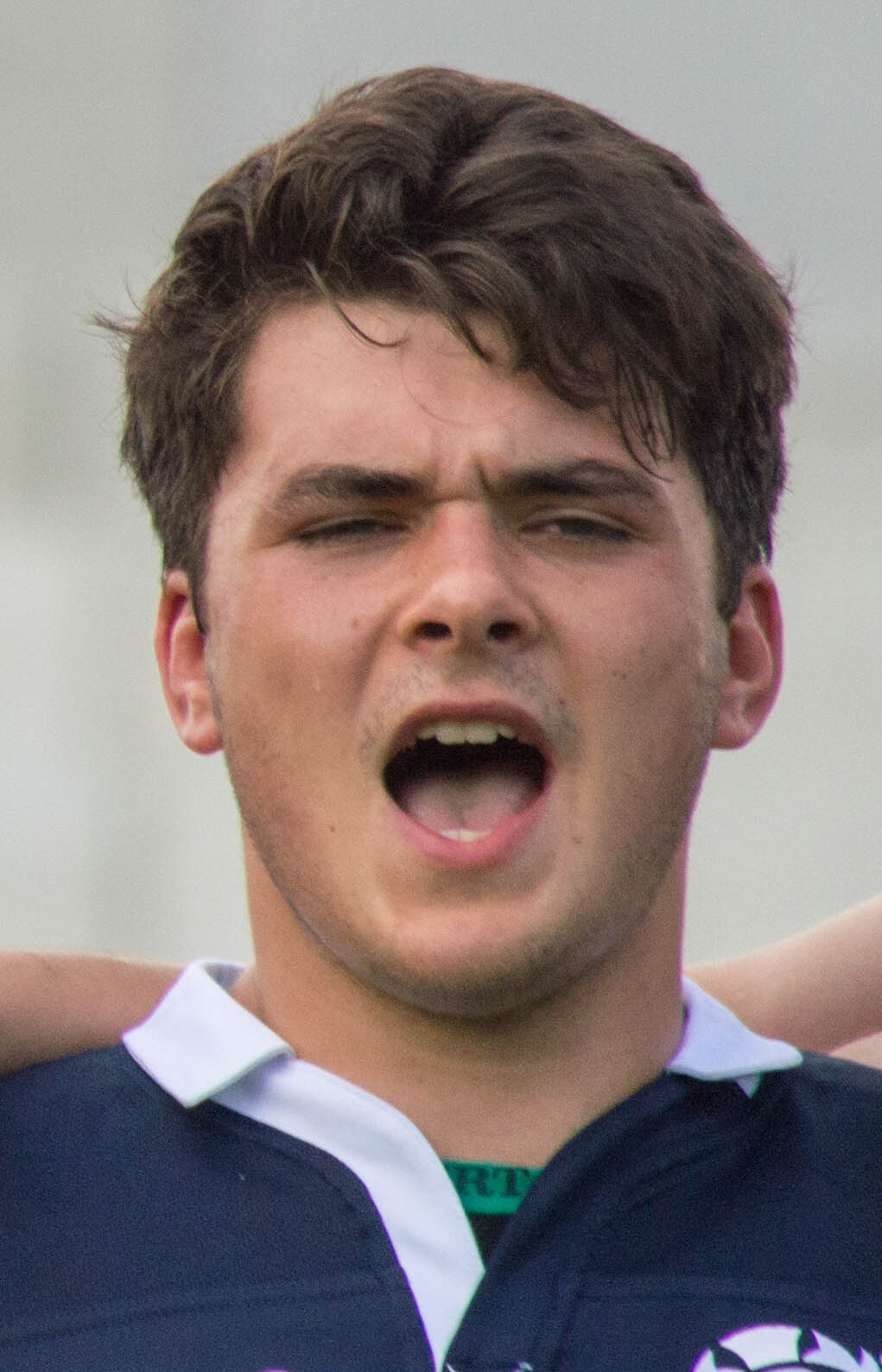
- Born: Lewis Wynne; 27 November 1996 (age 29) Falkirk, Scotland
- Height: 6 ft 2 in (1.88 m)
- Weight: 110 kg (17 st 5 lb)
- School: St Mungo's High School

Rugby union career
- Position: Flanker
Amateur team(s)
Years	Team	Apps	(Points)
2015-18	Stirling County		
Senior career
Years	Team	Apps	(Points)
2015-2019	Glasgow Warriors	19	(0)
2018-2019	→ London Scottish	9	(0)
2018	→ Edinburgh	1	(0)
2019–2020	London Scottish	40	(30)
2020–	Jersey Reds	0	(0)
International career
Years	Team	Apps	(Points)
2012-13	Scotland Under 16		
2013	Scotland Under 18		
2015	Scotland Under 20	5	(5)

Lewis Wynne (born 27 November 1996 in Falkirk, Scotland) is a Scottish rugby union player who plays for Jersey Reds at the Flanker position.

== Rugby Union career ==
=== Amateur career ===
When not in Warriors duty, Wynne plays for Stirling County. He was a member of Stirling County's Youth League Cup winning team in 2013.

Wynne has been drafted to Stirling County in the Scottish Premiership for the 2017-18 season.

=== Professional career ===
Wynne was an unused replacement for Glasgow Warriors in the December 2014 derby 'A' match against Edinburgh.

The following year Wynne was enrolled in the BT Sport Scottish Rugby Academy as a Stage 3 player. Stage 3 players are assigned to a professional club and given regional support. Wynne was assigned to Glasgow Warriors for the 2015-16 season.

Wynne made his debut for the Warriors in the pre-season match against Harlequins on 20 August 2016.

On 19 December 2016 it was announced that Wynne had been promoted out of the Scottish Rugby Academy securing a two-and-a-half-year deal with Glasgow Warriors.

He moved on loan to London Scottish for season 2018-19. He played 9 games before being recalled by the SRU.

He played for Edinburgh in a Pro14 match against the Scarlets.

On 11 June 2020, Wynne left London Scottish to join Championship rivals Jersey Reds from the 2020-21 season.

=== International career ===
He represented Scotland Under 16s in 2012 and 2013, at the Wellington Festival. He received his first Scotland Under 20 cap in 2015, playing against France.
