= Ruaridh MacKenzie =

Scottish rugby union player

Ruaridh Mackenzie
- Born: 10 August 1995 (age 31) Inverness, Scotland
- Height: 1.92 m (6 ft 4 in)
- Weight: 114 kg (17 st 13 lb)
- School: Christchurch Boys' High School
- University: Bond University, Australia
- Notable relative(s): Gregor Mackenzie, father

Rugby union career
- Position(s): Number Eight; Flanker
Amateur team(s)
| Years | Team | Apps | (Points) |
- Bond University RFC
| 2016- | Ayr | | |
Super Rugby
| Years | Team | Apps | (Points) |
- Queensland Reds U20

Ruaridh Mackenzie (born 10 August 1995) is a Scottish rugby union player who plays for Glasgow Warriors in the Number Eight or Flanker positions.

Born in Scotland, Mackenzie moved to New Zealand at only 3 months old when his parents emigrated there to run a beef and crop farm in the Amuri Plains in North Canterbury. His father is former Scotland international Gregor MacKenzie, now a farmer.

Growing up in New Zealand, Mackenzie went to Christchurch Boys' High School. He played for the school's rugby team.

In 2014 he went to Bond University in Australia, where he played for the university rugby team and Queensland Reds U20.

On 18 October 2016 it was announced that he had signed with Glasgow Warriors.

His contract is that of a partnership contract between Glasgow Warriors and Ayr. This means when he is not in use for the Warriors, Mackenzie

plays for Ayr.

He made his debut for Ayr in a 39 - 13 win over Glasgow Hawks at Millbrae on 15 October 2016.
