= Gregor MacKenzie =

Scotland international rugby union player

- Born: Alexander David Gregor MacKenzie; 9 July 1956 (age 70) Inverness, Scotland
- School: Blairmore School; Strathallan School
- Occupation: Farmer

Rugby union career
- Position: Prop
Amateur team(s)
Years	Team	Apps	(Points)
1974-84	Highland		
1976	Barbarians	2	
1984	Gala	1	
1984-	Selkirk		
1989-	Highland		
Provincial / State sides
Years	Team	Apps	(Points)
	North and Midlands	25	
1984-	South of Scotland District		
1989	North and Midlands		
International career
Years	Team	Apps	(Points)
	Scotland U16s	3	
- Scotland U21
1984	Scotland	1	

Alexander David Gregor MacKenzie (born 9 July 1956 in Inverness) is a former Scotland international rugby union player. His regular playing position was Prop.

== Rugby Union career ==
=== Amateur career ===
He first went to Blairmore School at Glass near Huntly. A small primary school, it also produced former Scotland captain David Sole.

MacKenzie was later educated at Strathallan School in Perthshire. In his younger days, he played at hooker and then flanker but the master at Strathallan converted him to Prop at the age of 16 and that position stuck.

He played for Highland.

Highland lost the player to New Zealand in 1977 when Mackenzie went to study agriculture at Lincoln College in Lincoln Town. While in New Zealand he played college rugby and trained with the All Blacks.

He went on a Barbarians tour playing the Welsh sides Newport and Penarth.

McKenzie headed to the Borders, hoping that moving there would put him more in contention for international honours. He played for Gala first. That single game, on 8 September 1984, was to cause McKenzie later issues as he was later banned for playing for Selkirk in any Border League matches that season; since their rules did not permit a player to play for two different Border League clubs in a season.

McKenzie played for Selkirk a matter of weeks later, moving from Gala, as a committee member on the Selkirk board had a vacancy on his farm.

He later returned north to play for Highland again.

=== Provincial career ===
McKenzie played for North and Midlands.

On moving to Selkirk, he then played for South of Scotland District.

On returning to the Highlands, he was again named in the North and Midlands squad.

=== International career ===
He had 3 caps for Scotland U16s while at Strathallan School.

He captained Scotland U21s.

On four occasions he was selected as a Scotland 'B' replacement.

MacKenzie was capped once in 1984 at prop against Australia on 8 December as part of their 1984 tour of Britain and Ireland. Australia won the match 37–12 at Murrayfield.

== Farming career ==
He ran the family farm at Nigg with his brother Kenneth.

He moved to the Borders then worked on a farm at Selkirk.

He now runs a farm near Hanmer Springs, Canterbury, New Zealand.

== Business career ==
Shortly after moving to Selkirk and working on a farm there, Mackenzie got a job in Edinburgh as a trainee consultant at Hill Samuel Investment Services. Without the farm work keeping him fit, Mackenzie turned to the weights at the gym.
