= Thibault Giroud =

French rugby union player, rugby coach, sprinter, bobsleigher & American footballer

Personal information
- Born: Thibault Giroud; 9 March 1974 (age 52) Grenoble, Isère, Auvergne-Rhône-Alpes, France
- Education: CBUL, Lecturer
- Height: 1.78 m (5 ft 10 in)
- Weight: 98 kg (216 lb; 15 st 6 lb)

Sport
- Sport: American football (1991-1997); Bobsleigh (1992-2002); Rugby union (2002-2004); Rugby league (2005-2009)
- Now coaching: Rugby union (2002-)
- Football career

Profile
- Position: Running back

Career history
- 1991-1992: Grenoble Centaurs
- 1992-1993: France
- 1993-1994: Victoria Bills
- 1994-1995: Munich Thunder
- 1995-1996: Amsterdam
- 1996-1997: Barcelona

Rugby union career
- Position: Wing
Amateur team(s)
Years	Team	Apps	(Points)
2002-03	Leopards		
Senior career
Years	Team	Apps	(Points)
2003-04	Saracens		
Coaching career
- Years: Team
- 2002-03: Cats (Strength & Conditioning Coach)
- 2003-04: Saracens (Strength & Conditioning Coach)
- 2004-05: Pau (Strength & Conditioning Coach)
- 2009-14: Biarritz Olympique (Strength & Conditioning Coach)
- 2016-17: Glasgow Warriors (Strength & Conditioning Coach)
- 2017-19: Toulon (Strength & Conditioning Coach)
- 2019-: France (Performance Director)
- Rugby league career

Coaching information
Club
Years	Team	Gms	W	D	L	W%
2005–2007	Harlequins RL (Strength & Conditioning Coach)
2007–2009	Celtic Crusaders (Strength & Conditioning Coach)
	Total	0	0	0	0

Thibault Giroud (born 9 March 1974 in Grenoble, France) is a French rugby union coach working as the Performance Director for the French national team. He was previously a strength and conditioning coach for Glasgow Warriors. He previously played for NFL Europe (American football) as a Running Back; trained as a Sprinter; as an Olympic Bobsleigher; then a rugby union player and now strength & conditioning coach with various rugby teams.

== Athletic career ==
=== Skiing ===
Giroud grew up in Biarritz where his first love was skiing. He stated: "I was skiing competitions, slalom, downhill, but it was expensive."

=== American football ===
In adolescence, Giroud became interested in American football which was then gaining a foothold in Europe. New teams were being created.

Spotted by a scout of Dartmouth College at a track meeting at Grenoble, Giroud got a scholarship and was drafted by the New York Jets, although he did not play in the NFL in America.

Back in France, Thibault played for Grenoble Centaurs and was then called up by the French international side.

He moved to Canada to play for the Victoria Bills in Quebec. He stayed in North America for 18 months.

He returned to Europe to play in the NFL Europe from 1995 to 1997. He played for Munich Thunder. That club folded after one year and then Giroud moved to play for Amsterdam Crusaders and the Barcelona Dragons.

=== Bob sleigh ===
Giroud moved back to winter sports after the American Football boom in Europe subsided in 1997. A chance meeting with Prince Albert, of Monaco - a noted sportsman and veteran of the Winter Olympics - convinced him to try out for the Monaco bob sleigh team. From 1998 to 2002 he switched to the French team as a bob sleigher, the culmination of which was being part of the 2002 France Winter Olympic Squad and their 4-man team entry to the Winter Olympics in Salt Lake City, USA in 2002.

=== Sprinting ===
That same year, 2002, provided another chance meeting with Namibian sprinter Frankie Fredericks takes Giroud into the world of sprinting. Giroud was marked as running 100 metres in 10.53 seconds.

=== Rugby Union ===
Through Fredericks, Thibault first helped train the Namibia national rugby union team.

In 2003, Giroud was to meet Andre Markgraaff, the former Springboks coach, who convinced him to give rugby union a try as a player. From Markgraaf he is introduced to Jean-Patrick Mourenon, manager of the South African rugby side Leopards and he joins his side as a Wing. He also starts as a training coach with the Lions (then known as the Cats).

His strength and speed were noted by Saracens who signed him both as a wing and as a strength and conditioning coach for season 2003-04. This was to be the end of his playing career and from then onwards he became a full-time coach.

== Coaching career ==
He moved back to France to Pau who recruited him as a strength and conditioning coach in 2004.

=== Rugby League ===
Giroud then moved to rugby league first with Harlequins, now London Broncos, from 2005 - and then onto the Celtic Crusaders in Wales at the start of 2007.

=== Rugby Union ===
Moving back to rugby union, Thibault signed for Biarritz Olympique. He stayed there for five seasons.

=== Consulting and Academic work ===
Thibault lectured at the Claude Bernard University of Lyon in France. He taught 'Intervening in the Physical Preparation in collective sports' which is a European Diploma (DUEPP).

In 2014, he started consulting for Addalyst High Performance Sports Services in Cleveland Ohio, USA. He also advises for Journal L'équipe, the French sports newspaper. He then moved to the Sports consultant firm The Athlete Factory as a Senior Strength and Conditioning Coach

In 2015, he was the co-author of the paper: Strategies to maintain body temperature and physical performance in professional rugby union players.

=== Glasgow Warriors ===
On 15 June 2016 it was announced that Giroud had secured a two-year deal to be a Strength and Conditioning Coach at Glasgow Warriors.

=== Toulon ===
Giroud left the Warriors in the summer of 2017 to move back to France with Toulon.
