= Brian Alainu'uese =

Samoa international rugby union player

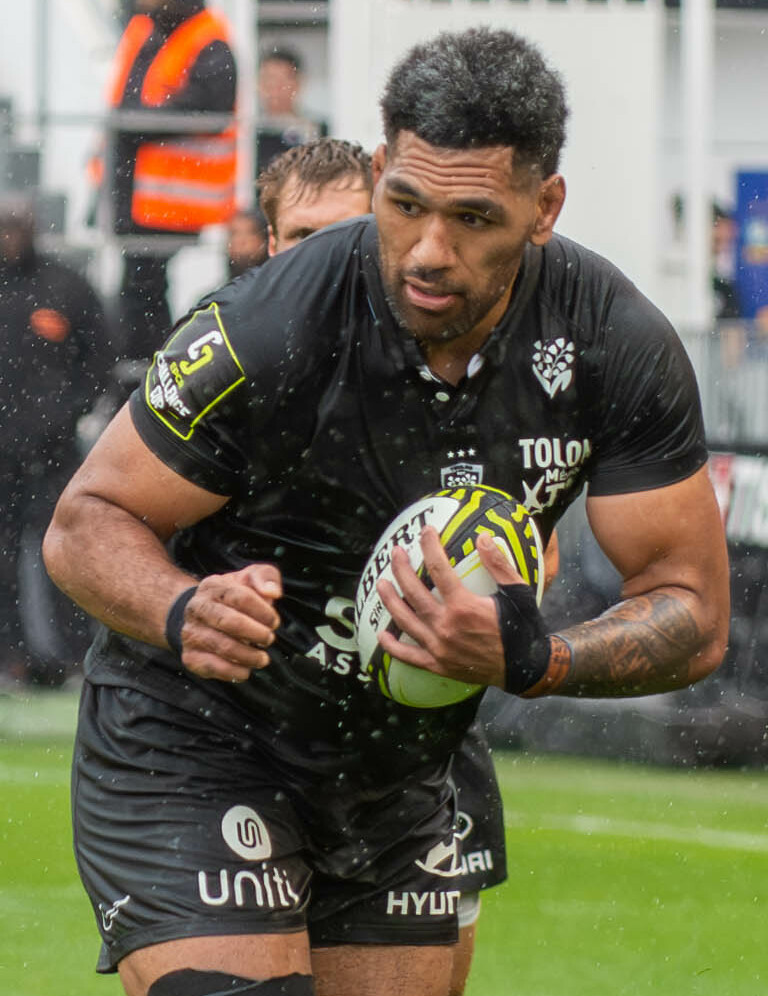
- Alainu'uese representing Toulon during the EPCR Challenge Cup
- Born: 19 March 1994 (age 32) Invercargill, New Zealand
- Height: 2.02 m (6 ft 8 in)
- Weight: 135 kg (298 lb; 21 st 4 lb)
- School: Wesley College

Rugby union career
- Position: Lock
- Current team: Toulon
Senior career
Years	Team	Apps	(Points)
2013–2016	Waikato	17	(15)
2015	Chiefs	2	(0)
2016–2018	Glasgow Warriors	22	(0)
2018–	Toulon	163	(55)
- Correct as of 28 August 2023
International career
Years	Team	Apps	(Points)
2013	Samoa U20	5	(5)
2022–	Samoa	8	(0)
- Correct as of 28 August 2023

Brian Alainu'uese (born 19 March 1994) is a professional rugby union player who plays as a lock for Top 14 club Toulon. Born in New Zealand, he represents Samoa at international level after qualifying on ancestry grounds.

== Club career ==
Alainu'uese has been drafted to Glasgow Hawks in the Scottish Premiership for the 2017-18 season.

Alainu'uese first appeared for Waikato against Horowhenua-Kapiti in July 2013 after which he went on to make 6 appearances in that year's ITM Cup. Injury ruled him out of the following 2 seasons, however in 2016, injury-free he returned to the Waikato senior squad.

Alainu'uese was a member of the Chiefs Under-18 programme and later moved into the franchise's development squad for the 2014 and 2015 seasons. He got his big chance during the 2015 Super Rugby season when he was called up as a short-term injury replacement by the Chiefs and went on to make 2 appearances.

On 24 October 2016 it was announced that he had signed for professional provincial team Glasgow Warriors in a deal to the end of the season. He made his competitive debut for Glasgow on 28 October 2016 against Benetton Treviso at Scotstoun Stadium. Langilangi Haupeakui also made his Warriors debut in the same match - Alain'uese replaced Tim Swinson on 51 minutes; and Haupeakui replaced Simone Favaro on 55 minutes. This gives Alainueuse a Glasgow Warrior No. 272 and Haupeakui a Glasgow Warrior No. 273.

On 23 October 2018 Alainu'uese joined Toulon after being released from his Glasgow Warriors contract by mutual consent

== International career ==
Alainu'uese was considered too young to be selected for the 2013 IRB Junior World Championship by New Zealand and instead was called up by Samoa for whom he made 5 appearances and scored 1 try. The move does not prevent him from appearing for the All Blacks senior team in the future.

He was named in Samoa's squad for their Northern Hemisphere tour in 2022. He received 2 senior caps in that tour.

== Career statistics ==
=== Club summary ===
As of 14 August 2016

Season	Team	Games	Starts	Sub	Mins	Tries	Cons	Pens	Drops	Points	Yel	Red
2015	Chiefs	2	0	2	22	0	0	0	0	0	0	0
Total		2	0	2	22	0	0	0	0	0	0	0
