= George Taylor (rugby union) =

Scottish rugby union player

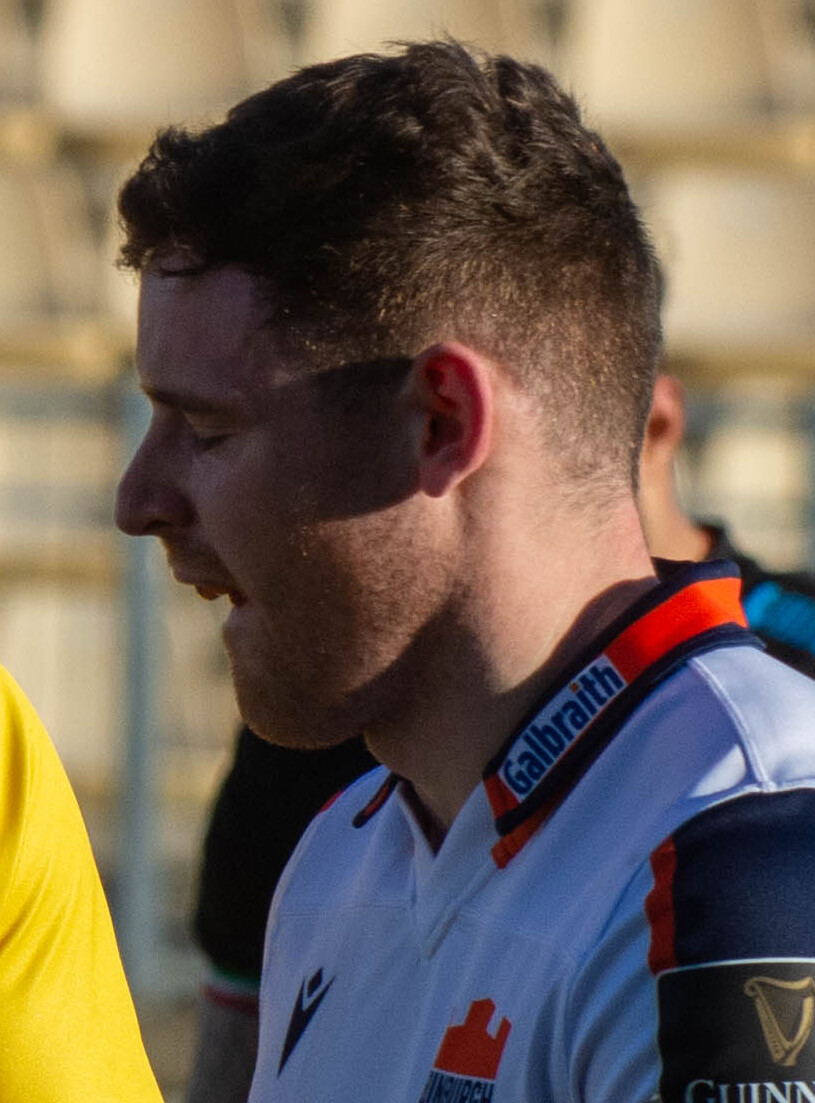
- Born: 24 November 1996 (age 29) Melrose, Scottish Borders, Scotland
- Height: 1.83 m (6 ft 0 in)
- Weight: 95 kg (14 st 13 lb)
- School: Earlston High School, Loretto School

Rugby union career
- Position: Centre
Senior career
Years	Team	Apps	(Points)
2018–2022	Edinburgh Rugby	38	(30)
- Correct as of 01 June 2022

George Taylor (born 24 November 1996) is a Scottish former rugby union player who spent his entire professional career playing for Edinburgh Rugby in the United Rugby Championship. Taylor's primary position was centre.

== Career ==
=== Club ===
Taylor made his debut for Edinburgh against Munster on 30 November 2018.

=== International ===
Taylor received his first call up to the senior Scotland squad in February 2021 for the 2021 Six Nations Championship.

=== Retirement ===
On January 13, 2022, following a long battle with persistent head injuries, Taylor announced his retirement from rugby calling it the "toughest decision" he'd ever had to make. Taylor also stated his ambition to enter into a career in finance.
