= Nick Grigg =

Scotland international rugby union player

- Born: Nicholas Grigg; 18 September 1992 (age 34) Wellington, New Zealand
- Height: 175 cm (5 ft 9 in)
- Weight: 90 kg (14 st 2 lb; 200 lb)
- School: Newlands College

Rugby union career
- Position: Centre
- Current team: Hawke's Bay, Old Glory DC
Amateur team(s)
Years	Team	Apps	(Points)
- Petone Rugby Club
2015–2018	Stirling County		
Senior career
Years	Team	Apps	(Points)
2015–2021	Glasgow Warriors	95	(100)
2022	Red Hurricanes Osaka	5	(5)
2022–	Hawke's Bay	40	(40)
2022	US Carcassonne	14	(10)
2024	Miami Sharks	14	(35)
2025	Old Glory DC	12	(32)
- Correct as of 13 December 2025
International career
Years	Team	Apps	(Points)
2017–2019	Scotland	9	(0)
- Correct as of 25 November 2024
National sevens team
Years	Team		Comps
2016	Scotland 7s		11 (5)

Nick Grigg (born 18 September 1992) is a rugby union player, who currently plays as a midfield back for Hawke's Bay in New Zealand's domestic National Provincial Championship competition and Old Glory DC in Major League Rugby.

He previously played for Red Hurricanes Osaka in Japan, Glasgow Warriors in Scotland, US Carcassonne in France and Miami Sharks in the United States. Grigg was born and raised in New Zealand, but has represented Scotland – for which he is eligible due to his Scottish heritage – both in the fifteen-a-side form of the game and rugby sevens.

== Rugby union career ==
=== Amateur career ===
He previously played for Petone and for the under-20 Wellington side in New Zealand.

When not playing for Glasgow Warriors, Grigg played for Stirling County.

Grigg was drafted to Stirling County in the Scottish Premiership for the 2017–18 season.

=== Professional career ===
He was part of the Hurricanes Development XV in New Zealand.

Grigg trialled with the Warriors in March 2015 before signing for Glasgow Warriors and securing a place at the Scottish Rugby Academy for Glasgow District as a Stage 3 player. Membership of the academy is restricted to Scottish-Qualified players. Stage 3 players are aligned to a professional club and given regional support.

He has played for Glasgow Warriors in their pre-season match against Clermont. The Warriors lost the match 28–10.

He also featured in an early season friendly against the British Army Rugby Union side. Glasgow Warriors beat the Army side 71–0.

He started in the derby match against Edinburgh in an 'A' match at Broadwood Stadium. Glasgow Warriors beat Edinburgh, 26–5. He made his competitive debut for the Glasgow side on 18 March 2016 against Leinster at Scotstoun Stadium in the Pro12 in a 12 - 6 victory for the Scottish side. He became Glasgow Warrior No. 262.

He graduated from the Scottish Rugby Academy and signed a professional contract with Glasgow Warriors on 23 March 2016.

He was named in the Pro14 dream team for the 2017–18 season.

He made 95 appearances for the Warriors, scoring 20 tries for the side.

It was announced in December 2021 that Grigg would join Japanese side Osaka Red Hurricanes in 2022. Grigg said that playing for Glasgow Warriors had much improved his life, although the move from New Zealand had been scary, and praised the players, the people and the culture. He said he was sad to leave Glasgow, but looked forward to the new opportunity for a fresh start. Japan was a new culture to experience, and closer to his home and family than Scotland.

On 29 July 2022, Grigg was named in the Hawke's Bay squad for the 2022 Bunnings NPC season. He made his debut for the province on 6 August 2022 against Waikato.

On 6 October 2022, it was announced that Grigg signed an injury replacement contract with French side US Carcassonne to play in the Pro D2, where he joined with fellow ex-Scotland international and ex-Glasgow Warrior Rob Harley. He made his debut for Carcassonne on 7 October 2022 against Massy.

Grigg returned to Hawke's Bay for the 2023 season and scored his first try for the province on 15 September 2023 in a 57–7 win over Manawatu.

On 7 December 2023, the Miami Sharks announced the signing of Grigg ahead of their inaugural Major League Rugby season. He made his MLR debut in the club's season opener on 3 March 2024 against Chicago Hounds and played a total of 14 games for the club.

On 13 February 2025, Grigg was named in the Old Glory DC squad for the 2025 Major League Rugby season. He played his first game for the club on 8 March 2025 against Anthem Rugby Carolina and scored a try on debut.

=== International career ===
He is Scottish-qualified as his grandfather is from Ayrshire in Scotland.

On 25 January 2016, Grigg was named in the Scotland Sevens squad for that year's Wellington Sevens tournament. He made his international debut in the tournament, confirming his Scottish nationality, on 30 January 2016. He played against South Africa, coming off the bench for his debut.

Grigg made his international XV debut for Scotland against Fiji on 24 June 2017.
