= George Horne (rugby union) =

Scottish rugby union player (born 1995)

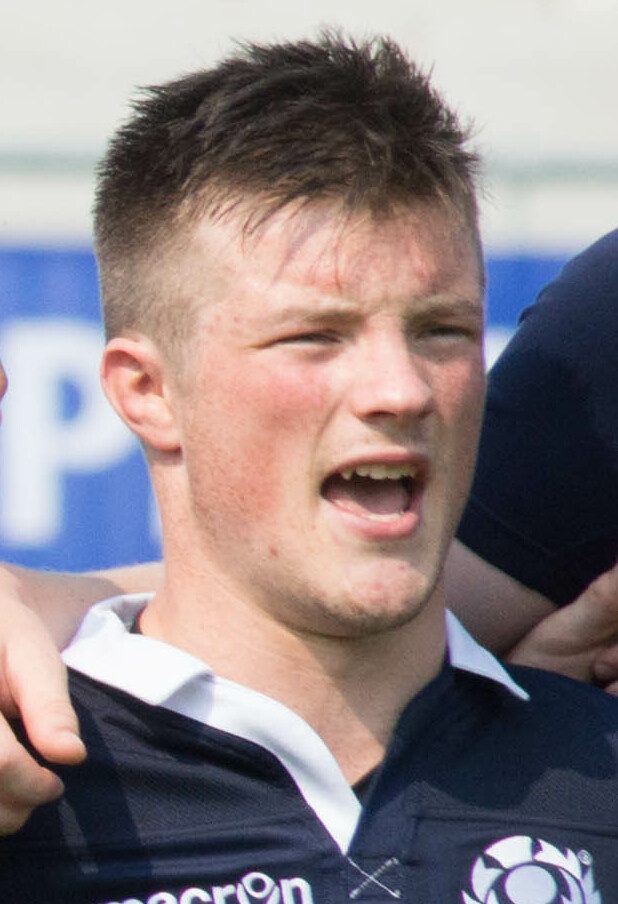
- Horne representing Scotland during the World Rugby Under 20 Championship
- Born: 12 May 1995 (age 31) Dundee, Scotland
- Height: 1.75 m (5 ft 9 in)
- Weight: 79 kg (174 lb; 12 st 6 lb)
- School: Bell Baxter High School; Strathallan School
- University: University of Edinburgh

Rugby union career
- Position: Scrum-half
- Current team: Glasgow Warriors
Senior career
Years	Team	Apps	(Points)
2015–2016	→ London Scottish (loan)	15	(5)
2016–	Glasgow Warriors	162	(670)
- Correct as of 30 October 2026
International career
Years	Team	Apps	(Points)
2014–2015	Scotland U20	12	(59)
2016–2018	Scotland 7s	44	(133)
2018–	Scotland	54	(96)
2022	Scotland 'A'	1	(10)
- Correct as of 18 November 2026

George Horne (born 12 May 1995) is a Scottish professional rugby union player who plays as a scrum-half for United Rugby Championship club Glasgow Warriors and the Scotland national team.

== Early life ==
Coming through the school set up, Horne was a pupil at Bell Baxter High School before moving to Strathallan School. He is currently studying physical education at the University of Edinburgh.

Horne has played for Howe of Fife and Currie.

Horne currently plays for amateur team Glasgow Hawks when not playing for the Warriors.

Horne was drafted to Glasgow Hawks in the Scottish Premiership for the 2017–18 season.

== Club career ==
Horne was one of the new inductees for season 2015–16 at the new Scottish Rugby Academy as a Stage 3 player. Stage 3 players are assigned to professional clubs and Horne was assigned to Glasgow Warriors.

Horne made his debut for Glasgow Warriors in a friendly match against the British Army Rugby Union side on 25 September 2015. In a 71–0 victory for the Warriors, Horne came off the bench to grab a try.

In November 2015, Horne was loaned to London Scottish, by Glasgow Warriors, to gain more experience of playing professional rugby.

Horne remained as a Stage 3 player assigned to Glasgow Warriors in the 2016-17 season. He made his competitive debut for the Warriors in the Pro12 match against the Ospreys on 25 November 2016. Horne has an exceptional try scoring rate, averaging better than a try every other game at both club and international levels.

In December 2024, he scored a hattrick of tries and three conversions in the opening round of the 2024–25 Champions Cup beating Sale Sharks 38–19.

On 29 March 2025, he broke the record of all-time try scorer for the Glasgow Warriors, beating the record set by D. T. H. van der Merwe.

== International career ==
Horne has represented Scotland at under-17, under-19 and under-20 levels.

Coming through the Scotland age grades, Horne made his debut for the Scotland 7s side on 2 December 2016 against USA 7s at the Dubai Sevens.

Horne gained his first senior XV cap for Scotland on 16 June 2018 when playing against the United States. The following week he scored two tries as Scotland beat Argentina 15–44.

On 9 October 2019, Horne scored a hat-trick in a 61–0 win over Russia at the 2019 Rugby World Cup. He also had a fourth try disallowed for a forward pass in the build up.

He was capped by Scotland 'A' on 25 June 2022 in their match against Chile.

In 2023, Horne was selected in Scotland's 33 player squad for the 2023 Rugby World Cup in France.

== Career statistics ==
=== List of international tries ===
No.	Date	Venue	Opponent	Score	Result	Competition
1	23 June 2018	Estadio Centenario, Resistencia, Argentina	Argentina	5–0	44–15	2018 June rugby union tests
2	23 June 2018	Estadio Centenario, Resistencia, Argentina	Argentina	36–3	44–15	2018 June rugby union tests
3	6 September 2019	Murrayfield Stadium, Edinburgh, Scotland	Georgia	27–9	36–9	2019 Rugby World Cup warm-up matches
4	9 October 2019	Shizuoka Stadium, Fukuroi, Japan	Russia	19–0	61–0	2019 Rugby World Cup
5	9 October 2019	Shizuoka Stadium, Fukuroi, Japan	Russia	26–0	61–0	2019 Rugby World Cup
6	9 October 2019	Shizuoka Stadium, Fukuroi, Japan	Russia	47–0	61–0	2019 Rugby World Cup
7	24 September 2023	Allianz Riviera, Nice, France	Tonga	29-17	45–17	2023 Rugby World Cup
8	12 July 2024	Audi Field, Washington DC, United States of America	United States	33–7	42–7	2024 mid-year rugby union tests
9	1 November 2025	Murrayfield Stadium, Edinburgh, Scotland	United States	68-0	85-0	2025 end-of-year rugby union internationals
10	23 November 2025	Murrayfield Stadium, Edinburgh, Scotland	Tonga	40–0	56-0	2018 June rugby union tests
11	23 November 2025	Murrayfield Stadium, Edinburgh, Scotland	Tonga	47-0	56-0	2018 June rugby union tests
12	7 February 2026	Stadio Olimpico, Rome, Italy	Italy	15-18	18-15	2026 Six Nations Championship

as of 6 July 2026

== Personal life ==
Horne's brother is the former Glasgow Warriors centre and Scotland international Peter Horne.
