= Tjiuee Uanivi =

Namibia international rugby union player

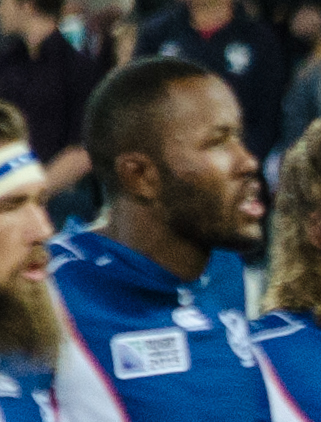
- Born: 31 December 1990 (age 35) Otjiwarongo, Namibia
- Height: 2.01 m (6 ft 7 in)
- Weight: 110 kg (17 st 5 lb; 240 lb)

Rugby union career
- Position: Lock / Flanker
- Current team: US Montauban
Youth career
- 2012: Brive
Amateur team(s)
Years	Team	Apps	(Points)
2009–2012	United Rugby Club		
2017	Glasgow Hawks		
Senior career
Years	Team	Apps	(Points)
2013–2015	Brive	10	(5)
2016	Sharks XV	5	(0)
2016–2017	Glasgow Warriors	5	(0)
2017–2019	London Scottish	31	(15)
2019–2021	RC Massy	17	(10)
2021–present	US Montauban	79	(20)
- Correct as of 9 March 2021
International career
Years	Team	Apps	(Points)
2014–present	Namibia	31	(11)
- Correct as of 9 March 2021

Tjiuee Uanivi (born 31 December 1990) is a Namibian rugby union player that normally plays as a lock or flanker. He currently plays for US Montauban in the ProD2.

== Early life ==
Uanivi was born in Otjiwarongo and grew up in Windhoek. He first picked up a rugby ball whilst attending Pioneerspark Primary school before moving on to Academia High School where he was more interested in football than rugby, but picked it up again after school and joined United Rugby Club. He studied at the University of Namibia.

== Rugby Union career ==
=== Amateur career ===
When not involved with the Glasgow Warriors, Uanivi played for the Glasgow Hawks.

=== Professional career ===
Whilst playing for the Namibian tertiary institutes rugby team at the 2013 World Student Games he was spotted by a coach from Top14 side Brive who offered him a place at the club's academy. He debuted against Toulon in the same year and continued to play for them until 2015 having been offered a professional contract in his second season. After the 2015 Rugby World Cup, he moved to South Africa to join theSharks; he was also included in the Sharks squad for the 2016 Super Rugby season.

He played five times for a Sharks XV in the 2016 Currie Cup qualification series – and returned to the northern hemisphere, signing for Scottish Pro12 side Glasgow Warriors for the 2016–2017 season.

Uanivi made his debut for the Warriors in the pre-season match against Harlequins on 20 August 2016.

On 4 May 2017 it was announced that Uanivi would leave the Warriors at the end of the season. He played 5 times for the Glasgow club.

On 13 July 2017 it was announced that Uanivi had signed for London Scottish.

He left London Scottish after the 2018/19 season to join RC Massy in the Federale 1. He spent two seasons with the French third division club.

On 9 March 2021 it was announced that Uanivi had signed for French ProD2 side US Montauban for the 2021/22 season.

=== International career ===
He made his debut for Namibia in 2014 against Germany, and was a member of their 2015 Rugby World Cup squad. He was selected for the 2019 Rugby World Cup and was selected to start all four games, captaining the team against eventual winners South Africa and Italy.
