= Cameron Fenton =

Scottish rugby union player (born 1995)

- Born: Cameron Fenton; 20 November 1995 (age 30) Scotland
- Height: 6 ft 0 in (1.83 m)
- Weight: 106 kg (16 st 10 lb)
- School: Bell Baxter High School, Strathallan School

Rugby union career
- Position: Hooker / Prop
Amateur team(s)
Years	Team	Apps	(Points)
- Howe of Fife RFC
- Stirling County
2016–2017	Glasgow Hawks	9	(0)
Senior career
Years	Team	Apps	(Points)
2014–2017	Glasgow Warriors	2	(0)
2016–2017	→London Scottish	5	(10)
2017	→Eastern Suburbs	8	(5)
2017–	Edinburgh Rugby	11	(20)
- Correct as of 10 January 2019
International career
Years	Team	Apps	(Points)
2014	Scotland U20	3	(0)
- Correct as of 17 March 2018

Cameron Fenton (born 20 November 1995 in Scotland) is a Scottish rugby union player who plays for Edinburgh Rugby in the Pro14. Fenton can play at Hooker or Prop positions. He is a graduate of the Scottish Rugby Academy.

== Amateur career ==
Fenton began playing rugby at Bell Baxter High School, with whom he won the Brewin Dolphin Plate. He was then awarded a scholarship to Strathallan School.

At amateur club level he began at Howe of Fife Rugby Club. He then moved to the BT Premiership side Stirling County followed by the Glasgow Hawks.

== Professional career ==
Fenton secured a place on the Elite Development Programme and was aligned to Glasgow Warriors for the 2014–15 season. This meant he could continue playing for Stirling County whilst training and challenging for a place at the Warriors.

Fenton came on as a substitute in the Glasgow Warriors v Edinburgh Rugby 'A' match at Broadwood Stadium, Cumbernauld on 18 November 2015. The Warriors won the match 26–5.

He made his competitive debut for Glasgow Warriors, from the bench, in the Pro12 match against Munster Rugby at Rugby Park, Kilmarnock on 19 February 2016. The Warriors won the match 27–24, securing a try bonus point in the process.

On 25 July 2016 it was announced that Fenton would join London Scottish as part of the performance partnership with the SRU. This was part of a loan move but he was released by London Scottish back to the Warriors so he could play in their match against Canada 'A'.

On 12 September 2017, Edinburgh Rugby announced they had signed Fenton to a one-year deal.

== International career ==
He has represented Scotland at under-17, under-18 and under-20.
