= North Berwick RFC =

Scottish rugby union club based in North Berwick, East Lothian

- Full name: North Berwick Rugby Football Club
- Founded: 1952; 74 years ago
- Location: North Berwick, East Lothian, Scotland
- Ground(s): Recreation Park, North Berwick
- League: East Division 1
- 2024–25: East Division 2
Team kit

Official website
- www.pitchero.com/clubs/northberwick/

North Berwick RFC is a rugby union club based in North Berwick, Scotland. The Men's team currently plays in East Division 1.

== History ==
The club was founded in 1952.

Harvey Elms, the Scotland 7s international player stated:

Rugby means a lot to the town. A lot of people are passionate about it. I have very fond memories of growing up playing rugby there. The commitment from the volunteers to coach the kids was very important. It is a place that is recognised for developing players.I have great memories of the North Berwick Sevens, I played in my last year of school and we managed to win it, I remember Lewis Carmichael and I both got the opportunity to play.

== Sides ==
The club runs a 1st XV, a 2nd XV and an over 35s side.

== Sevens tournament ==
The club runs the North Berwick Sevens. They compete for the Stewart Cup.

Their first Sevens tournament was held in 1960.

== Honours ==
=== Men's ===
- North Berwick Sevens
  - Champions (7):1973, 1981, 1982, 1989, 1997, 2013, 2016
- Edinburgh District Sevens
  - Champions (2): 1977, 1979
- Currie Sevens
  - Champions (1): 1981
- Old Augustinians Sevens
  - Champions: 1978, 1980, 1981, 1982, 1983
- Penicuik Sevens
  - Champions: 2003, 2009

== Notable former players ==
=== Men ===
==== Edinburgh Rugby ====
The following former North Berwick RFC players have represented Edinburgh Rugby.

- (Scotland) Chris Dean
- (Scotland) Rory Darge
- (Scotland) Lewis Carmichael
- (Scotland) Callum Hunter-Hill
- (Scotland) Tom Brown
- (Scotland) Callum Hunter-Hill

==== Scotland ====
The following former North Berwick RFC players have represented Scotland.

- (Scotland) Lewis Carmichael
- (Scotland) Tom Brown
- (Scotland) Rory Darge
