= Scotland national under-16 rugby union team =

Scotland Under 16
- Union: Scottish Rugby Union
Team kit	Change kit

The Scotland national under-16 rugby union team is one of several junior national rugby union teams behind the Scottish national side.

It is sometimes known as the Scotland Schools national team.

== Current set up ==
Scotland now run three Under 16 sides. The three sides - comprising 50 players in total - are split into three colours:- Red, Green and Blue.

The Red and Blue U16s are home-based players; whilst the Green U16s side is composed of Scottish Qualified players based outside of Scotland.

== See also ==
=== Men's National teams ===
==== Senior ====
- Scotland national rugby union team
- Scotland A national rugby union team
- Scotland national rugby sevens team

==== Development ====
- Emerging Scotland
- Scotland B national rugby union team
- Scotland Club XV

==== Age Grades ====
- Scotland national under-21 rugby union team
- Scotland national under-20 rugby union team
- Scotland national under-19 rugby union team
- Scotland national under-18 rugby union team
- Scotland national under-17 rugby union team
- Scotland national under-16 rugby union team

=== Women's National teams ===
==== Senior ====
- Scotland women's national rugby union team
- Scotland women's national rugby union team (sevens)
