= Stirling County RFC =

Scottish rugby union club, based in Stirling

Stirling County
- Full name: Stirling County Rugby Football Club
- Union: SRU
- Nickname: County
- Founded: 1946; 80 years ago
- Ground: Bridgehaugh (Capacity: 4,000)
- President: John Gibson
- Coach: Eddie Pollock
- Captain: Reyner Kennedy
- League(s): Men: Scottish National League Division One; Women: Scottish Women's Premiership
- 2025–26: Men: Scottish National League Division One, 2nd of 10; Women: Scottish Women's Premiership, 2th of 8
Team kit

Official website
- stirlingcounty-rfc.co.uk

Stirling County RFC is a Scottish rugby union club based in Stirling. The club plays its home games at Bridgehaugh. It runs a number of sides. The men's side competes in the Scottish National League Division One, the women's side competes in the Scottish Women's Premiership.

Between the 2019–2020 and 2023–2024 seasons the club ran a men's professional side known as Stirling Wolves which competed in the Super 6 league and Super Sprint competitions.

== History ==
During the season of 2004–05, Stirling County celebrated its centenary. Rugby has its origins in the town in the 1870s, resulting in the formation of Stirling HSFP in the latter part of the nineteenth century. The F.P. club joined the Scottish Rugby Union in 1904, hence the celebration of the centenary this season. In 1925, Bridge of Allan Rugby Club was founded with both clubs uniting in 1946 to form Stirling County.

While the team of 1959–60 went undefeated, it was not until the formation of the national leagues in the 1970s that Stirling had a springboard to success. Another vital factor was the creation of a strong youth section at this time. In 1995, County achieved the unique distinction of being the first club to rise through the ranks from the depths of the seventh division and win the Scottish Championship.

Uniquely, the club played against the Barbarians at Stirling Albion F.C. home, Forthbank Stadium in 1995. The club has been prolific in producing a large number of age-group internationalists while senior internationalists who have worn County's colours include George Graham, Ally Hogg, Ian Jardine, Alastair Kellock, Kenny Logan, Kevin McKenzie, James McLaren, Grant Gilchrist, Adam Ashe, Nick Grigg Jamie Bhatti, and Finn Russell.

In 2012–13, County recorded their highest league finish for 16 years, third place in RBS Premier One, and qualified for the cross-border British & Irish Cup competition for the second consecutive year.

Stirling County also has the most successful youth set-up, winning the Scottish National Youth League Cup more times than any other team,

Stirling County RFC compete in the Scottish Rugby Super Series as Stirling Wolves and represent Caledonia District in the competition. In 2023, they became the last ever winners of the FOSROC Super Series Championship, defeating the Ayrshire Bulls in the final.

Stirling County 1st XV compete in National League Division 2 while the Wolves Second XV play in West Reserve League Division 1.

== Sevens ==
The club run the Stirling Sevens tournament. Teams play for the Dr. Welsh Cup. The tournament began in 1948, two years after the County side was created.

== Honours ==
=== Men ===
- Super Series (Scottish rugby union competition)
  - Champions (1): 2023–24 Super Series
- Stirling Sevens
  - Champions (12): 1978, 1979, 1980, 1981, 1983, 1985, 1986, 1989, 1990, 1994, 1995, 2013
- Scottish Premiership
  - Champions (1): 1994–95
- Hawick Wanderers & PSA Sevens
  - Champions (1): 1990
- Lochaber Sevens
  - Champions (1): 1994
- Highland Sevens
  - Champions (5): 1982, 1983, 1984, 1993, 1996
- Arran Sevens
  - Champion (2): 1994, 1996
- Mull Sevens
  - Champions (7): 1991, 1993, 1997, 1998, 2007, 2009, 2011
- Alloa Sevens
  - Champions (2): 1990, 1995
- Strathendrick Sevens
  - Champions (2): 1994, 1998
- Glenrothes Sevens
  - Champions (1): 1983
- Earlston Sevens
  - Champions (1): 1995
- Ayr Sevens
  - Champions (1): 1987
- Kirkcaldy Sevens
  - Champions (1): 1984
- Currie Sevens
  - Champions (1): 1993
- Greenock Sevens
  - Champions (1): 1991
- Crieff Sevens
  - Champions (2): 2010, 2011

=== Women ===
- Mull Sevens
  - Champions (2): 2014, 2015
