= 2018–19 Glasgow Warriors season =

Glasgow Warriors 2018–2019
- Ground: Scotstoun Stadium (Capacity: 7,351)
- Coach: (New Zealand) Dave Rennie
- Captain(s): (Scotland) Ryan Wilson (New Zealand) Callum Gibbins
- Most caps: (Scotland) Rob Harley (28)
- Top scorer: (Scotland) Adam Hastings (197)
- Most tries: (Scotland) George Horne (12)
- League: Pro14
- 1st in Conference A & Runner-up
1st kit	2nd kit

The 2018–19 season saw Glasgow Warriors compete in the competitions: the Guinness Pro14 and the European Champions Cup.

== Season overview ==
=== New co-captaincy ===
The Warriors went back to a co-captaincy role - previously done by the club in season 2016–17.

This season Callum Gibbins joined Ryan Wilson as the Warriors' co-captains for the season ahead.

== Team ==
=== Coaches ===
- Head Coach: (New Zealand) Dave Rennie
- Assistant Coach: (Scotland) Kenny Murray
- Assistant Coach: (Wales) Jonathan Humphreys
- Assistant Coach: (New Zealand) Jason O'Halloran
- Assistant Coach: (Scotland) Mike Blair
- Forwards Coach: (Scotland) John Dalziel (from May 2019)
- Head Strength and Conditioning Coach: (New Zealand) Phil Healey (to October 2018)
- Asst. Strength and Conditioning Coach: (Portugal) Francisco Tavares (to February 2019)
- Asst. Strength and Conditioning Coach: (England) George Petrakos (now Head S & C)
- Asst. Strength and Conditioning Coach: (Ireland) Liam Walshe (from December 2018)
- Asst. Strength and Conditioning Coach: (New Zealand) Brad Mayo
- Lead Performance Analyst: Toby West
- Asst. Performance Analyst: Greg Woolard (now Lead PA)
- Asst. Performance Analyst: Graham O'Riordan (from March 2019)

=== Staff ===
- Managing Director: Nathan Bombrys
- Chairman: Charles Shaw
- Advisory Group: Walter Malcolm, Douglas McCrea, Alan Lees, Jim Preston, Paul Taylor
- Rugby Operations Manager: John Manson
- Kit Manager & Masseur: Dougie Mills
- Clinical Manager and Team Physiotherapist: Nicola McGuire
- Rehabilitation Physiotherapist: Gabrielle McCullough
- Team Doctor: Dr. David Pugh
- Team Doctor: Dr. Jonathan Hanson
- Commercial Operations Manager: Alastair Kellock
- Communications Manager: Jeremy Bone
- Communications Asst: Jack Reid
- Content Producer: Graeme Thomson
- Marketing Insight Executive: Claire Scott
- Operations Manager: James Acheson
- Marketing and Partnerships Manager: Darroch Ramsay
- Partnership Sales Manager: Ross Curle
- Partnership Account Manager: Oliver Norman
- Partnership Account Manager: Jim Taylor
- Community Manager: Lindsey Smith
- Community Rugby Coach: Stuart Lewis

=== Squad ===
Hookers (Scotland) Fraser Brown (Scotland) Kevin Bryce (Scotland) James Malcolm (Scotland) Grant Stewart (Scotland) George Turner Props (Scotland) Alex Allan (Scotland) Jamie Bhatti (Scotland) Zander Fagerson (Tonga) Siua Halanukonuka (South Africa) Oli Kebble (Scotland) Adam Nicol (South Africa) Petrus du Plessis (Scotland) D'Arcy Rae Locks (Samoa) Brian Alainu'uese (Scotland) Scott Cummings (Scotland) Andrew Davidson (Scotland) Jonny Gray (Scotland) Kiran McDonald (United States) Greg Peterson (Scotland) Tim Swinson	Loose forwards (Scotland) Adam Ashe (Scotland) Matt Fagerson (Scotland) Bruce Flockhart (Scotland) Chris Fusaro (New Zealand) Callum Gibbins (Scotland) Thomas Gordon (Scotland) Rob Harley (Scotland) Matt Smith (United States) David Tameilau (Scotland) Ryan Wilson (Scotland) Lewis Wynne Scrum halves (Australia) Nick Frisby (Scotland) George Horne (Fiji) Nikola Matawalu (Scotland) Ali Price Fly halves (Scotland) Adam Hastings (Scotland) Ruaridh Jackson (South Africa) Brandon Thomson	Centres (Scotland) Alex Dunbar (Scotland) Nick Grigg (Scotland) Peter Horne (Scotland) Sam Johnson (Scotland) Huw Jones (Scotland) Patrick Kelly (Scotland) Stafford McDowall Back three (Scotland) Robert Beattie (Scotland) Stuart Hogg (Scotland) Rory Hughes (Scotland) Lee Jones (New Zealand) Lelia Masaga (Scotland) Max McFarland (Scotland) Robbie Nairn (Scotland) Tommy Seymour (Australia) Ratu Tagive (Canada) D. T. H. van der Merwe

==== Scottish Rugby Academy Stage 3 players ====
These players are given a professional contract by the Scottish Rugby Academy. Although given placements they are not contracted by Glasgow Warriors. Players graduate from the academy when a professional club contract is offered.

These players are assigned to Glasgow Warriors for the season 2018–19. A further intake will be announced later in August 2018.

Academy players promoted in the course of the season are listed with the main squad.

- (Scotland) Robbie Smith - Hooker
- (Scotland) Euan McLaren - Prop
- (Scotland) Murphy Walker - Prop
- (Scotland) Cameron Henderson - Lock
- (Scotland) Marshall Sykes - Lock
- (Scotland) Kaleem Barreto - Scrum half
- (Scotland) Ross Thompson - Fly-half
- (Scotland) Ollie Smith - Centre
- (Scotland) Logan Trotter - Wing

==== Back up players ====
Other players used by Glasgow Warriors over the course of the season.

- (New Zealand) Joe Reynolds (Currie) – Fly-half
- Kyle Steyn (Scotland 7s) – Centre

== Player statistics ==
During the 2018–19 season, Glasgow have used 50 different players in competitive games. The table below shows the number of appearances and points scored by each player.

Position	Nation	Name	Pro14			Champions Cup			Total	
Position	Nation	Name	Apps (sub)	Tries	Points kicked	Apps (sub)	Tries	Points kicked	Apps (sub)	Total pts
HK	(Scotland)	Fraser Brown	9(2)	2	0	4	0	0	13(2)	10
HK	(Scotland)	Kevin Bryce	1(10)	1	0	(3)	0	0	1(13)	0
HK	(Scotland)	Robbie Smith	(1)	0	0	0	0	0	(1)	0
HK	(Scotland)	Grant Stewart	5(9)	3	0	2(1)	1	0	7(10)	20
HK	(Scotland)	George Turner	8(3)	2	0	1(3)	0	0	9(6)	10
PR	(Scotland)	Alex Allan	3(9)	0	0	(4)	0	0	3(13)	0
PR	(Scotland)	Jamie Bhatti	7(10)	0	0	(3)	0	0	7(13)	0
PR	(Scotland)	Zander Fagerson	11(2)	2	0	1	0	0	12(2)	10
PR	(Tonga)	Siua Halanukonuka	4(6)	0	0	2(2)	0	0	6(8)	0
PR	(South Africa)	Oli Kebble	13(2)	1	0	7	1	0	20(2)	10
PR	(Scotland)	Adam Nicol	1(3)	0	0	0	0	0	1(3)	0
PR	(South Africa)	Petrus du Plessis	(2)	0	0	(4)	0	0	(6)	0
PR	(Scotland)	D'Arcy Rae	7(10)	0	0	4(1)	0	0	11(11)	0
LK	(Scotland)	Scott Cummings	16(2)	1	0	2(1)	1	0	18(3)	10
LK	(Scotland)	Andrew Davidson	1(1)	0	0	0	0	0	1(1)	0
LK	(Scotland)	Jonny Gray	11	0	0	5(1)	1	0	16(1)	5
LK	(Scotland)	Kiran McDonald	1(4)	0	0	0	0	0	1(4)	0
LK	(United States)	Greg Peterson	1(2)	1	0	(1)	0	0	1(3)	5
LK	(Scotland)	Tim Swinson	8(2)	2	0	3(2)	0	0	11(4)	10
BR	(Scotland)	Adam Ashe	14(3)	3	0	1(1)	2	0	15(4)	25
BR	(Scotland)	Matt Fagerson	13(3)	5	0	6	1	0	19(3)	30
BR	(Scotland)	Bruce Flockhart	(4)	0	0	0	0	0	(4)	0
BR	(Scotland)	Chris Fusaro	8(7)	1	0	1(6)	1	0	9(13)	10
BR	(New Zealand)	Callum Gibbins	12(1)	4	0	6	0	0	18(1)	20
BR	(Scotland)	Thomas Gordon	2(4)	0	0	0	0	0	2(4)	0
BR	(Scotland)	Rob Harley	18(3)	1	0	6(1)	0	0	24(4)	5
BR	(Scotland)	Matt Smith	2(4)	0	0	(1)	0	0	2(5)	0
BR	(United States)	David Tameilau	1(5)	1	0	0	0	0	1(5)	5
BR	(Scotland)	Ryan Wilson	7(2)	1	0	5	1	0	12(2)	10
SH	(Australia)	Nick Frisby	5(7)	1	0	(1)	0	0	5(8)	5
SH	(Scotland)	George Horne	8(8)	9	0	1(5)	3	0	9(13)	60
SH	(Fiji)	Nikola Matawalu	12(6)	6	0	1(4)	2	0	13(10)	40
SH	(Scotland)	Ali Price	10(3)	5	0	6(1)	3	0	16(4)	40
FH	(Scotland)	Adam Hastings	14(3)	2	126	6	1	56	20(3)	197
FH	(Scotland)	Ruaridh Jackson	14	1	0	1	0	0	15	5
FH	(South Africa)	Brandon Thomson	4(5)	1	52	1	0	8	5(5)	65
CE	(Scotland)	Alex Dunbar	4(3)	1	0	1	0	0	5(3)	5
CE	(Scotland)	Nick Grigg	10(1)	4	0	3	0	0	13(1)	20
CE	(Scotland)	Peter Horne	10(6)	5	36	1(4)	0	0	11(10)	61
CE	(Scotland)	Sam Johnson	7(1)	3	0	4	0	0	11(1)	15
CE	(Scotland)	Huw Jones	3(5)	2	0	3(2)	1	0	6(7)	15
CE	(Scotland)	Patrick Kelly	1(3)	0	0	0	0	0	1(3)	0
CE	(Scotland)	Stafford McDowall	9(1)	2	0	2	0	0	11(1)	10
CE	(Scotland)	Kyle Steyn	9	2	0	1	0	0	10	10
WG	(Scotland)	Rory Hughes	6(4)	2	0	1(1)	0	0	7(5)	10
WG	(Scotland)	Lee Jones	3(1)	2	0	2	0	0	5(1)	10
WG	(Scotland)	Robbie Nairn	3(5)	2	0	0	0	0	3(5)	10
WG	(Scotland)	Tommy Seymour	12	8	0	5	1	0	17	45
WG	(Canada)	D. T. H. van der Merwe	8(1)	3	0	5	1	0	13(1)	20
FB	(Scotland)	Stuart Hogg	9	1	12	5	1	0	14	22

== Staff movements ==
=== Coaches ===
==== Staff promotions ====
- (England) George Petrakos to Head Strength and Conditioning Coach (from December 2018)
- Greg Woolard to Lead Performance Analyst

==== Personnel in ====
- (Ireland) Liam Walshe from (England) Worcester Warriors Asst. Strength and Conditioning (from December 2018) Coach
- (New Zealand) Brad Mayo from (New Zealand) Bay of Plenty Asst. Strength and Conditioning Coach
- (Republic of Ireland) Graham O'Riordan from (Wales) Dragons Asst. Performance Analyst (from March 2019)
- John Dalziel from Scotland 7s Forwards Coach (from May 2019)

==== Personnel out ====
- (New Zealand) Phil Healey to (New Zealand) Blues
- (Portugal) Francisco Tavares to (Portugal) Sporting Lisbon

=== Medical ===
==== Personnel in ====
- Dr. Jonathan Hanson (Team doctor) (since December 2017)

==== Personnel out ====
- Dr. David Pugh

== Player movements ==
=== Academy promotions ===
- (Scotland) Bruce Flockhart from Scottish Rugby Academy
- (Scotland) Robbie Nairn from Scottish Rugby Academy
- (Scotland) Adam Nicol from Scottish Rugby Academy
- (Scotland) Stafford McDowall from Scottish Rugby Academy
- (Scotland) Grant Stewart from Scottish Rugby Academy

=== Player transfers ===
==== In ====
- (United States) David Tameilau from (France) RC Narbonne
- (Scotland) Bruce Flockhart from (France) Stade Niçois (loan ends)
- (Scotland) Josh Henderson from (France) Stade Niçois (loan ends)
- (Australia) Nick Frisby from (France) Bordeaux Bègles
- (Scotland) Kevin Bryce from (Scotland) Edinburgh
- (Scotland) Thomas Gordon from (Scotland) Edinburgh
- (Scotland) Andrew Davidson from (England) Newcastle Falcons (loan)
- (South Africa) Petrus du Plessis from (England) London Irish

==== Out ====
- (Scotland) Finn Russell to (France) Racing 92
- (Scotland) Pat MacArthur to (Scotland) Ayr
- (Scotland) Ryan Grant retired
- (Scotland) Richie Vernon to (England) London Scottish
- (Italy) Samuela Vunisa to (Italy) Calvisano
- (Italy) Leonardo Sarto to (England) Bristol Bears
- (Scotland) Lewis Wynne to (England) London Scottish (loan)
- (Scotland) Henry Pyrgos to (Scotland) Edinburgh
- (Scotland) Sam Yawayawa to (England) Cambridge
- (Scotland) George Stokes to (England) Darlington Mowden Park
- Josh Henderson to Scotland 7s
- (Scotland) James Malcolm to (England) Doncaster Knights (loan)
- (Samoa) Brian Alainu'uese to (France) Toulon
- (Scotland) Andrew Davidson to (England) Newcastle Falcons (loan ends)
- (Scotland) Robert Beattie to (England) London Scottish
- (United States) Greg Peterson to (France) Bordeaux Bègles
- (Scotland) Alex Dunbar to (England) Newcastle Falcons (loan)

== Competitions ==
=== Pre-season and friendlies ===
The pre-season matches were a mixed bag for the Warriors. Dave Rennie was happy with the Harlequins match at Perth; noting that the Glasgow side were missing 20 internationals.

In contrast, the Northampton Saints match was a bit of a wake-up call. Rennie stated that 'We got beaten up a bit tonight' and blamed a lack of communication, the quality of tackle technique and a lack of patience. On a more positive note he continued 'They're all things we can tidy up.'

==== Match 1 ====
18 August 2018
2pm

Glasgow Warriors (Scotland)	50 - 17	(England) Harlequins
Try: Patrick Kelly; Rory Hughes; Matt Smith; Alex Allan; Nick Frisby; Adam Ashe; Niko Matawalu x 2 Con: Brandon Thomson x 2 Adam Hastings x 3	Preview; Report; Report; Report	Try: Phil Swainston; Renaldo Bothma; Marcus Smith; Con: Marcus Smith

North Inch, Perth
Attendance: 5918
Referee: Lloyd Linton

Glasgow Warriors: Oli Kebble, James Malcolm, Darcy Rae, Scott Cummings, Johnny Gray, Bruce Flockhart, Chris Fusaro, Matt Smith, Nick Frisby, Brandon Thomson, Lelia Masaga, Paddy Kelly, Sam Johnson, Robbie Nairn, Rory Hughes
Replacements (all used): Kevin Bryce, Grant Stewart, Alex Allan, Adam Nicol, Greg Peterson, Rob Harley, Thomas Gordon, Kaleem Barreto, Adam Hastings, Ratu Tagive, Stafford McDowell, Alex Dunbar, Niko Matawalu, Joe Reynolds, Ruaridh Jackson, Adam Ashe
Harlequins: 15. James Lang, 14. Nathan Earle, 13. Joe Marchant, 12. Ben Tapuai, 11. Gabriel Ibitoye, 10. Marcus Smith, 9. Danny Care,
1. Nick Auterac, 2. Dave Ward, 3. Phil Swainston, 4. Stan South, 5. Matt Symons, 6. Dino Lamb, 7. Luke Wallace, 8. Renaldo Bothma
Replacements: Elia Elia, Max Crumpton, Mark Lambert, Will Collier, Hugh Tizard, Ben Glynn, Archie White, Dave Lewis, Charlie Mulchrone,
Tim Visser, Henry Cheeseman, Charlie Walker, Ross Chisholm

==== Match 2 ====
24 August 2018
7.30pm

Northampton Saints (England)	41 - 15	(Scotland) Glasgow Warriors
Try: James Haskell penalty try Cobus Reinach x 2 Ken Pisi; James Grayson; James Fish; Con: James Grayson x 2	Preview; Report; Report; Report	Try: Tommy Seymour; Nikola Matawalu; D. T. H. van der Merwe

Franklin's Gardens
Attendance: 6,833
Referee: Christophe Ridley

Northampton Saints: Tuala (Mallinder 55); Pisi (Tuitavake 28), Hutchinson (Burrell 5 (Pisi 40 (Collins 75)), Francis (Burrell 55), Collins (Sleightholme 40); Biggar (Grayson 2), Reinach (Mitchell 55); Waller (c) (Davis 40 (van Wyk 60)), Fish (Haywood 40 (Hartley 60)), Franks (Ford-Robinson 40 (Painter 60)); Ribbans (Ratuniyarawa 40), Lawes (Moon 60); Haskell (Gibson 40), Brüssow (Ludlam 40), Harrison (Eadie 40).
Glasgow Warriors: Ruaridh Jackson; Tommy Seymour, Alex Dunbar, Sam Johnson, Niko Matawalu; Adam Hastings, George Horne; Jamie Bhatti, George Turner, Darcy Rae; Scott Cummings, Greg Peterson; Rob Harley, Callum Gibbins(c), Ryan Wilson (c).
Replacements: (all used) Kevin Bryce, Grant Stewart, Alex Allan, Oli Kebble, Adam Nicol, Andrew Davidson, Matt Smith, Adam Ashe, Nick Frisby, Brandon Thomson, Patrick Kelly, Nick Grigg, D. T. H. van der Merwe, Rory Hughes.

=== Pro14 ===
==== League table ====
2018–19 Pro14 table
Conference A
	Team	P	W	D	L	PF	PA	PD	TF	TA	TBP	LBP	PTS
1	(Scotland) Glasgow Warriors (RU)	21	16	0	5	621	380	+241	83	48	15	2	81
2	(Ireland) Munster (SF)	21	16	0	5	612	348	+264	82	44	11	2	77
3	(Ireland) Connacht (QF)	21	12	0	9	475	394	+81	60	55	7	6	61
4	(Wales) Ospreys (PO)	21	12	0	9	445	404	+41	53	47	6	4	58
5	(Wales) Cardiff Blues	21	10	0	11	497	451	+46	60	58	7	7	54
6	(South Africa) Cheetahs	21	8	1	12	541	606	−65	80	80	9	3	46
7	(Italy) Zebre	21	3	0	18	260	640	−380	35	85	5	2	19
Conference B
	Team	P	W	D	L	PF	PA	PD	TF	TA	TBP	LBP	PTS
1	(Ireland) Leinster (CH)	21	15	1	5	672	385	+287	95	49	12	2	76
2	(Ireland) Ulster (SF)	21	13	2	6	441	424	+17	58	54	6	1	63
3	(Italy) Benetton (QF)	21	11	2	8	474	431	+43	62	55	6	3	57
4	(Wales) Scarlets	21	10	0	11	510	470	+40	68	54	7	5	52
5	(Scotland) Edinburgh	21	10	0	11	431	436	−5	52	59	6	5	51
6	(Wales) Dragons	21	5	1	15	339	599	−260	37	84	1	3	26
7	(South Africa) Southern Kings	21	2	1	18	385	735	−350	54	107	5	7	22
If teams are level at any stage, tiebreakers are applied in the following order -: 1. number of matches won 2. the difference between points for and points against 3. the number of tries scored 4. the most points scored 5. the difference between tries for and tries against 6. the fewest red cards received 7. the fewest yellow cards received
Green background indicates teams that compete in the Pro14 play-offs, and also earn a place in the 2019–20 European Champions Cup (excluding South African teams who are ineligible); Blue background indicates teams outside the play-off places that earn a place in the 2019–20 European Champions Cup; Yellow background indicates the loser of the play-off between the two fourth-ranked European teams in each conference, that earned a place in the 2019–20 European Rugby Challenge Cup. Plain background indicates teams that earn a place in the 2019–20 European Rugby Challenge Cup. (CH) Champions. (RU) Runners-up. (SF) Losing semi-finalists. (QF) Losing quarter-finalists. (PO) Champions Cup play-off winners.

==== Results ====
===== Round 1 =====
1 September 2018
3pm

(1 BP) Connacht (Ireland)	26–27	(Scotland) Glasgow Warriors (1 BP)
Try: Kelleher 14' c Bealham 21' c Con: J. Carty (2/2) 16', 22'; Pen: J. Carty (4/5) 11', 34', 40', 42'	Preview; Report; Report; Report	Try: Seymour 1' m Turner 17' c Wilson 31' m Ashe 64' c Con: P. Horne (1/3) 18'; Hogg (1/1) 65'; Drop: Hogg (1/1) 73'

Galway Sportsgrounds
Attendance: 5,329
Referee: Ian Davies (WRU)

===== Round 2 =====
7 September 2018
7.35pm

Glasgow Warriors (Scotland)	25–10	(Ireland) Munster
Try: Gibbins 22' m Hogg 28' c Ashe 36' c Con: Hogg (2/2) 29', 36'; Pen: Horne (1/2) 14'; Hogg (1/1) 72'	Preview; Report; Report; Report	Try: Marshall 69' c Con: Carbery (1/1) 70'; Pen: Hanrahan (1/1) 43'

Scotstoun Stadium
Attendance: 7,351
Referee: Ben Whitehouse (WRU)

===== Round 3 =====
15 September 2018
7.30pm

(1 BP) Cheetahs (South Africa)	24–52	(Scotland) Glasgow Warriors (1 BP)
Try: Small-Smith 8' m Jaer (2) 11' c, 54' m Lee 29' c Con: van Rensburg (1/1) 12'; Schoeman (1/3) 30'	Preview; Report; Report; Report	Try: Hastings 1' c Price (2) 24' c, 45' c Seymour 41' c Van der Merwe 41' c Gibbins 64' c G. Horne 75' c Con: Hastings (7/7) 2', 25', 42', 45', 51', 65', 76'; Pen: Hastings (1/1) 61'

Toyota Stadium
Attendance: 4,700
Referee: Frank Murphy (IRFU)

===== Round 4 =====
22 September 2018
15:00

(1 BP) Southern Kings (South Africa)	38–28	(Scotland) Glasgow Warriors (1 BP)
Try: Penxe 5' c Du Toit (2) 9' c, 71' c Van Rooyen 18' c Klaasen 52' c Con: Banda (5/5) 6', 10', 18', 52', 72'; Pen: Banda (1/2) 40'	Preview; Report; Report; Report	Try: Grigg 59' c Van der Merwe (2) 63' c, 80' c Brown 76' c Con: Hastings (4/4) 59', 64', 76', 80+1'

NMU Stadium
Attendance: 3,160
Referee: Andrew Brace (IRFU)

===== Round 5 =====
29 September 2018
7.35pm

(1 BP) Glasgow Warriors (Scotland)	29–13	(Wales) Dragons
Try: Kebble 4' c L. Jones (2) 37' m, 41' m H. Jones 54' m Dunbar 77' c Con: Hastings (2/5) 5', 78'	Preview; Report; Report; Report	Try: Warren 45' c Con: Lewis (1/1) 46'; Pen: Robson (2/2) 7', 20'

Scotstoun Stadium
Attendance: 7,135
Referee: Stuart Berry (SARU)

===== Round 6 =====
5 October 2018
7.35pm

(1 BP) Glasgow Warriors (Scotland)	36–8	(Italy) Zebre
Try: H. Jones 5' c Turner 54' c Peterson 63' c G. Horne 65' c P. Horne 75' m Con: Hastings (4/5) 6', 56', 64', 66'; Pen: Hastings (1/1) 38'	Preview; Report; Report; Report	Try: Tauyavuca 34' m Pen: Violi (1/1) 43'

Scotstoun Stadium
Referee: Quinton Immelman (SARU)

===== Round 7 =====
27 October 2018
5.15pm

Munster (Ireland)	25–24	(Scotland) Glasgow Warriors (2 BP)
Try: Cronin 8' c Wootton 65' m Mathewson 72' c Con: Hanrahan (1/1) 9'; Keatley (1/2) 73'; Pen: Hanrahan (1/1) 55'; R. Scannell (1/1) 80'	Preview; Report; Report; Report	Try: G. Horne (2) 23' m, 35' c M. Fagerson 48' m P. Horne 59' c Con: P. Horne (1/3) 36'; Thomson (1/1) 60'

Thomond Park
Attendance: 13,356
Referee: Dan Jones (WRU)

===== Round 8 =====
2 November 2018
7.35pm

Ospreys (Wales)	20–29	(Scotland) Glasgow Warriors (1 BP)
Try: Cracknell 6' c Dirksen 74' c Con: S. Davies (2/2) 7', 74'; Pen: S. Davies (2/2) 25', 46'	Preview; Report; Report; Report	Try: Matawalu (3) 11' c, 14' c, 48' m Grigg 58' c Con: Thomson (3/4) 12', 15', 59'; Pen: Thomson (1/1) 3'

Liberty Stadium
Attendance: 6,399
Referee: Andrew Brace (IRFU)

===== Round 9 =====
23 November 2018
7.35pm

(1 BP) Glasgow Warriors (Scotland)	40–15	(Wales) Cardiff Blues
Try: Ashe 10' c Matawalu (2) 16' c, 67' c Gibbins 29' c Seymour 36' c Hughes 53' m Con: Horne (5/6) 11', 17', 30', 37', 67'	Preview; Report; Report; Report	Try: Dacey 43' m Evans 59' c Con: Evans (1/2) 60'; Pen: Evans (1/1) 4'

Scotstoun Stadium
Attendance: 7,351
Referee: John Lacey (IRFU)

===== Round 10 =====
1 December 2018
5.15pm

Glasgow Warriors (Scotland)	29–20	(Wales) Scarlets
Try: Thomson 29' c Grigg 41' c Con: Thomson (2/2) 30', 42'; Pen: Thomson (5/7) 12', 21', 50', 59', 78'	Preview; Report; Report; Report	Try: J. Davies 46' m S. Evans 68' m Blommetjies 74' c Con: Patchell (1/3) 76'; Pen: Patchell (1/1) 6'

Scotstoun Stadium
Attendance: 7,351
Referee: Frank Murphy (IRFU)

===== Round 11 - 1872 Cup 1st leg =====
22 December 2018
17:15

Edinburgh (Scotland)	23–7	(Scotland) Glasgow Warriors
Try: Van der Merwe (2) 11' c, 59' c Con: Van der Walt (2/2) 13', 61'; Pen: Van der Walt (3/3) 9', 21', 54'	Preview; Report; Report; Report	Try: P. Horne 36' c Con: Hastings (1/1) 37'

Murrayfield Stadium
Attendance: 21,190
Referee: Mike Adamson (SRU)

===== Round 12 - 1872 Cup 2nd leg =====
29 December 2018
3pm

Glasgow Warriors (Scotland)	8–16	(Scotland) Edinburgh
Try: G. Horne 77' m Pen: Hastings (1/1) 19'	Preview; Report; Report; Report	Try: McInally 49' c Con: van der Walt (1/1) 50'; Pen: van der Walt (3/3) 4', 25', 59'

Scotstoun Stadium
Attendance: 7,351
Referee: George Clancy (IRFU)

===== Round 13 =====
5 January 2019
3pm

Benetton (Italy)	20–17	(Scotland) Glasgow Warriors (1 BP)
Try: Budd (2) 13' c, 27' m Steyn 50' m Con: Allan (1/3) 14'; Pen: Allan (1/1) 67'	Preview; Report; Report; Report	Try: Johnson 22' c G. Horne 39' c Con: Hastings (2/2) 22', 40'; Pen: Hastings (1/1) 62'

Stadio Comunale di Monigo
Attendance: 3,800
Referee: Joy Neville (IRFU)

===== Round 14 =====
25 January 2019
7.35pm

Glasgow Warriors (Scotland)	9–3	(Wales) Ospreys
Pen: Thomson (3/3) 42', 60', 62'	Preview; Report; Report; Report	Pen: Davies (1/3) 31'

Scotstoun Stadium
Attendance: 7,246
Referee: John Lacey (IRFU)

===== Round 15 =====
16 February 2019
7.35pm

(2 BP) Cardiff Blues (Wales)	34–38	(Scotland) Glasgow Warriors (1 BP)
Try: Summerhill (3) 3' c, 37' c, 74' m Lane 41' m Smith 77' c Con: Evans (3/5) 4', 38', 77'; Pen: Evans (1/2) 51'	Preview; Report; Report; Report	Try: Grigg 14' c Price 18' c Horne 29' c Frisby 68' c Tameilau 69' c Con: Horne (5/5) 15', 19', 30', 69', 71'; Pen: Horne (1/2) 7'

Cardiff Arms Park
Attendance: 5907
Referee: George Clancy (IRFU)

===== Round 16 =====
22 February 2019
7.35pm

(1 BP) Glasgow Warriors (Scotland)	43–17	(Ireland) Connacht Rugby
Try: G. Horne 0' c Swinson 30' c Stewart (2) 38' c, 44' c Nairn (2) 66' c, 72' m Con: Thomson (5/6) 1', 31', 38', 45', 67'; Pen: Thomson (1/1) 16'	Preview; Report; Report; Report	Try: Fitzgerald 21' m Boyle 61' m Daly 69' c Con: Godwin (1/1) 70'

Scotstoun Stadium
Attendance: 7,246
Referee: Ben Whitehouse (WRU)

===== Round 17 =====
2 March 2019
6.15pm

Zebre (Italy)	10–42	(Scotland) Glasgow Warriors (1BP)
Try: Castello 51' c Con: Brummer (1/1) 51'; Pen: Canna (1/1) 4'	Preview; Report; Report; Report	Try: M. Fagerson (2) 8' c, 29' c Fusaro 15' c MacDowall 20' c Jackson 25' c Swinson 43' c Con: Hastings (6/6) 9', 16', 20', 26', 30', 44'

Stadio Sergio Lanfranchi
Attendance: 2,500
Referee: Andrew Brace (IRFU)

===== Round 18 =====
23 March 2019
7.45pm

(1BP) Glasgow Warriors (Scotland)	35–17	(South Africa) Cheetahs
Try: Gibbins 5' c Steyn 17' c Hughes 28' c McDowall 56' c Cummings 76' c Con: P. Horne (3/3) 6', 18', 28'; Hastings (2/2) 58', 77'	Preview; Report; Report; Report	Try: Small-Smith 14' m, 77' m Dweba 45' c Con: Schoeman (1/3) 46'

Scotstoun Stadium
Attendance: 7,246
Referee: George Clancy (IRFU)

===== Round 19 =====
5 April 2019
7.35pm

(1 BP) Glasgow Warriors (Scotland)	30–7	(Ireland) Ulster
Try: Brown 13' c Hastings 18' m Seymour 40' m Z. Fagerson 43' c Con: Hastings (2/4) 14', 44'; Pen: Hastings (2/2) 26', 57'	Preview; Report; Report; Report	Try: Herring 7' c Con: Cooney (1/1) 8' c

Scotstoun Stadium
Attendance: 7,351
Referee: Stuart Berry (SARU)

===== Round 20 =====
13 April 2019
3pm

(1 BP) Leinster (Ireland)	24–39	(Scotland) Glasgow Warriors (1 BP)
Try: D. Kearney (2) 9' m, 60' m R. Kearney (2) 35', 51'; Con: R. Byrne (2/4) 36', 53'	Preview; Report; Report; Report	Try: Johnson 15' c Seymour 39' m M. Fagerson 64' c Z. Fagerson 72' c G. Horne 80+2' c Con: Hastings (4/5) 16', 66', 73', 80+3'; Pen: Hastings (2/2) 4', 14'

RDS Arena
Attendance: 14,368
Referee: Marius Mitrea (FIR)

===== Round 21 - 1872 Cup 3rd leg =====
27 April 2019
7.35pm

(1 BP) Glasgow Warriors (Scotland)	34–10	(Scotland) Edinburgh
Try: Johnson 7'c Price 18'c Matawalu 58'c Seymour 74'c Con: Hastings (4/4) 8', 19', 60', 75'; Pen: Hastings 2', 29'	Preview; Report; Report; Report	Try: Van der Merwe 78'c Con: Hickey (1/1) 79'; Pen: Hickey 12'

Scotstoun Stadium
Attendance: 10,000
Referee: Mike Adamson (SRU)

Edinburgh won the 1872 Cup with a series score of 2 - 1.

==== Play-offs ====
===== Semi-finals =====
17 May 2019
7.35pm

Glasgow Warriors (Scotland)	50–20	(Ireland) Ulster
Try: Seymour 2'c, 54'm Price 16'c Harley 38'c Steyn 57'c P. Horne 67'c G. Horne 75'c Con: Hastings (6/7) 3', 18', 39', 58', 68', 76'; Pen: Hastings (1/1) 28'	Preview; Report; Report; Report	Try: Coetzee 60'm Herring 71'c Lowry 79'm Con: Burns (1/3) 71'; Pen: Cooney (1/1) 30'

Scotstoun Stadium
Attendance: 10,000
Referee: John Lacey (IRFU)

===== Final =====
25 May 2019
6.30pm

Glasgow Warriors (Scotland)	15–18	(Ireland) Leinster
Try: M. Fagerson 13' c Stewart 74' m Con: Hastings (1/2) 14'; Pen: Hastings (1/1) 22'	Preview; Report; Report; Report	Try: Ringrose 15' m Healy 27' c Con: Sexton (1/2) 29'; Pen: Sexton (2/3) 35', 51'

Celtic Park, Glasgow
Attendance: 47,128
Referee: Nigel Owens (WRU)

=== Europe ===
==== Pool ====
Team	P	W	D	L	PF	PA	Diff	TF	TA	TB	LB	Pts
(England) Saracens (1)	6	6	0	0	185	81	104	23	10	4	0	28
(Scotland) Glasgow Warriors (8)	6	4	0	2	147	119	28	19	16	3	0	19
(Wales) Cardiff Blues	6	2	0	4	138	174	–36	19	22	2	0	10
(France) Lyon	6	0	0	6	87	183	–96	10	23	0	0	0

==== Results ====
===== Round 1 =====
14 October 2018
3.15pm

Glasgow Warriors (Scotland)	3–13	(England) Saracens
Pen: Hastings (1/2) 22'	Preview; Report; Report; Report	Try: Rhodes 11' c Con: Farrell (1/1) 13'; Pen: Farrell (2/3) 15', 38'

Scotstoun Stadium
Attendance: 7,351
Referee: Mathieu Raynal (FFR)

===== Round 2 =====
21 October 2018
3.15pm

Cardiff Blues (Wales)	12–29	(Scotland) Glasgow Warriors (1 BP)
Try: Summerhill (2) 47' m, 77' c Con: Anscombe (1/2) 78'	Preview; Report; Report; Report	Try: Hastings 1' m Van der Merwe 3' c Price 42' c Gray 67' c Con: Hastings (3/4) 5', 43', 67'; Pen: Hastings (1/1) 25'

Cardiff Arms Park
Attendance: 9,497
Referee: Luke Pearce (RFU)

===== Round 3 =====
8 December 2018
1pm

Lyon (France)	22–42	(Scotland) Glasgow Warriors (1 BP)
Try: Arnold 24' c Nakaitaci 53' m McLeod 65' c Con: Pélissié (1/1) 25'; Palisson (0/1); Doussain (1/1) 66'; Pen: Pélissié 11'	Preview; Report; Report; Report	Try: Ashe (2) 20' c, 76' c Horne 38' c Hogg 58' m Jones 60' c Con: Hastings (4/5) 21', 39', 61', 77'; Pen: Hastings (3/3) 3', 15', 49'; Hogg (0/1); Drop: Hastings (0/1)

Matmut Stadium de Gerland
Attendance: 12,667
Referee: Matthew Carley (RFU)

===== Round 4 =====
15 December 2018
1pm

Glasgow Warriors (Scotland)	21–10	(France) Lyon
Try: Matawalu (2) 0' m, 21' c Con: Hastings (1/2) 22'; Pen: Hastings (3/3) 12', 17', 66'	Preview; Report; Report; Report	Try: Barassi 51' c Con: Doussain (1/1) 52'; Pen: Doussain (1/1) 40'

Scotstoun Stadium
Attendance: 7,351
Referee: Ben Whitehouse (WRU)

===== Round 5 =====
13 January 2019
3.15pm

(1 BP) Glasgow Warriors (Scotland)	33–24	(Wales) Cardiff Blues (1 BP)
Try: Stewart 26' c Cummings 32' c Fusaro 48' c Kebble 60' c Horne 77' m Con: Thomson (4/5) 27', 33', 49', 61'	Preview; Report; Report; Report	Try: Lane (2) 36' m, 70' c Millard 58' m Navidi 64' c Con: J. Evans (2/4) 65', 70'

Scotstoun Stadium
Attendance: 7,351
Referee: JP Doyle (RFU)

===== Round 6 =====
19 January 2019
1pm

(1 BP) Saracens (England)	38–19	(Scotland) Glasgow Warriors
Try: Spencer 7' c Koch 17' c B. Vunipola 29' c Itoje 69' c Skelton 80' c Con: Spencer (3/3) 7', 18', 30'; Lozowski (2/2) 70', 80'; Pen: Spencer (1/1) 3'	Preview; Report; Report; Report	Try: Seymour 9' m Price 13' c Wilson 20' c Con: Hastings (2/3) 14', 22'

Allianz Park
Attendance: 10,000
Referee: Pascal Gaüzère (FFR)

==== Quarter-finals ====
30 March 2019
3.15pm

Saracens (England) (1)	56–27	(8) (Scotland) Glasgow Warriors
Try: Williams (2) 4' c, 48' c Strettle (2) 25' m, 56' c Barritt 29' c George 62' c Tompkins 70' c Con: Lozowski (6/7) 5', 30', 49', 57', 63', 71'; Pen: Lozowski (3/3) 14', 42', 54'	Preview; Report; Report; Report	Try: Price 1' c G. Horne 66' c M. Fagerson 80' c Con: Hastings (3/3) 2', 67', 80'+2; Pen: Hastings (2/2) 32', 37'

Allianz Park
Attendance: 10,997
Referee: Nigel Owens (WRU)

== Warrior of the month awards ==
Award	Winner
September	(Scotland) Adam Hastings
October	(Scotland) Matt Fagerson
November	(Fiji) Nikola Matawalu
December	(Fiji) Nikola Matawalu
January	(Scotland) Rob Harley
February	(South Africa) Brandon Thomson
March	(Scotland) Stafford McDowall & (Scotland) Kyle Steyn
April	(Scotland) Jonny Gray
May	no award

== End of Season awards ==
Award	Winner
Young Player of the Season	(Scotland) Stafford McDowall
Coaches Award	(Scotland) Rob Harley
Test Player of the Season	(Scotland) Sam Johnson
Most Improved Player of the Season	(Scotland) Scott Cummings
Al Kellock Leadership Award	(Scotland) Ryan Wilson
Community Club of the Season	Lenzie
Try of the Season	(Scotland) Sam Johnson v. (Ireland) Leinster
Players' Player of the Season	(Scotland) Rob Harley
Player of the Season	(Scotland) Ali Price

== Competitive debuts this season ==
A player's nationality shown is taken from the nationality at the highest honour for the national side obtained; or if never capped internationally their place of birth. Senior caps take precedence over junior caps or place of birth; junior caps take precedence over place of birth. A player's nationality at debut may be different from the nationality shown. Combination sides like the British and Irish Lions or Pacific Islanders are not national sides, or nationalities.

Players in BOLD font have been capped by their senior international XV side as nationality shown.

Players in Italic font have capped either by their international 7s side; or by the international XV 'A' side as nationality shown.

Players in normal font have not been capped at senior level.

A position in parentheses indicates that the player debuted as a substitute. A player may have made a prior debut for Glasgow Warriors in a non-competitive match, 'A' match or 7s match; these matches are not listed.

Tournaments where competitive debut made:

**Scottish Inter-District Championship**	**Welsh–Scottish League**	**WRU Challenge Cup**	**Celtic League**	**Celtic Cup**	**1872 Cup**	**Pro12**	**Pro14**	**Rainbow Cup**	**United Rugby Championship**	**European Challenge Cup**	**Heineken Cup / European Champions Cup**

Crosshatching indicates a jointly hosted match.

Number	Player nationality	Name	Position	Date of debut	Venue	Stadium	Opposition nationality	Opposition side	Tournament	Match result	Scoring debut
296	(Australia)	**Nick Frisby**	(Scrum half)	2018-09-01	Away	Galway Sportsgrounds	(Ireland)	Connacht	Pro14	Win	Nil
297	(Scotland)	Robbie Nairn	(Wing)	2018-09-22	Away	NMU Stadium	(South Africa)	Southern Kings	Pro14	Loss	Nil
298	(Scotland)	Andrew Davidson	(Wing)	2018-09-29	Home	Scotstoun Stadium	(Wales)	Dragons	Pro14	Win	Nil
299	(United States)	**David Tameilau**	(No. 8)	2018-10-05	Home	Scotstoun Stadium	(Italy)	Zebre	Pro14	Win	Nil
300	(South Africa)	Petrus du Plessis	Centre	2017-10-14	Home	Scotstoun Stadium	(England)	Saracens	European Champions Cup	Loss	Nil
301	(Scotland)	Bruce Flockhart	(Flanker)	2018-11-02	Away	Liberty Stadium	(Wales)	Ospreys	Pro14	Win	Nil
302	(Scotland)	Thomas Gordon	(Flanker)	2019-01-25	Home	Scotstoun Stadium	(Wales)	Ospreys	Pro14	Win	Nil
303	(Scotland)	Robbie Smith	(Hooker)	2019-01-25	Home	Scotstoun Stadium	(Wales)	Ospreys	Pro14	Win	Nil
304	(Scotland)	**Kyle Steyn**	Wing	2019-02-16	Away	Cardiff Arms Park	(Wales)	Cardiff Blues	Pro14	Win	Nil

== Sponsorship ==
- SP Energy Networks - Title Sponsor and Community Sponsor
- Scottish Power - Official Kit

=== Official kit supplier ===
- Macron

=== Official kit sponsors ===
- Malcolm Group
- McCrea Financial Services
- Denholm Oilfield
- Ross Hall Hospital
- Story Contracting
- Leidos

=== Official sponsors ===
- The Famous Grouse
- Clyde Travel Management
- Harper Macleod
- Caledonia Best
- Eden Mill Brewery and Distillery
- David Lloyd Leisure
- Crabbie's
- Cala Homes
- Capital Solutions
- Martha's Restaurant
- Sterling Furniture

=== Official partners ===
- A.G. Barr
- Benchmarx
- Black & Lizars
- Cameron House
- Glasgow Airport
- Healthspan Elite
- KubeNet
- Mentholatum
- MSC Nutrition
- Smile Plus
- Lenco Utilities
- Scot JCB News Scotland
- HF Group
- Primestaff
- Village Hotel Club
- The Crafty Pig
- Kooltech
- Savills
- iPro Sports
- RHA
