= 2017–18 Glasgow Warriors season =

Glasgow Warriors 2017–2018
- Ground: Scotstoun Stadium (Capacity: 7,351)
- Coach: (New Zealand) Dave Rennie
- Captain: (Scotland) Ryan Wilson
- Most caps: (Scotland) Ruaridh Jackson (Scotland) Alex Allan (23)
- Top scorer: (Scotland) Finn Russell (109)
- Most tries: (Scotland) George Horne (10)
- League: Pro14
- 1st in Conference A (Semi-finalist)
1st kit	2nd kit

The 2017–18 season saw Glasgow Warriors compete in the competitions: the Guinness Pro14 and the European Champions Cup.

== Season overview ==
=== League expansion ===
With the addition of two South African sides, the Pro12 expanded to become the Pro14 for season 2017–18.

The format of the league changed to accommodate the extra teams. It was split into two conferences and matches played in a conference system with the addition of 2 derby fixtures. The play-off system also changed with the winners of the conferences hosting a Semi-Final and each conference runners up and 3rd place teams playing off in Quarter-Final fixtures.

For the Pro14's inaugural season, Glasgow Warriors were placed in a conference with the Ospreys, Cardiff Blues, Munster, Connacht, Zebre and Cheetahs.

=== New coach, new captain ===
Dave Rennie was installed as new Head Coach in August 2017. One of his first decisions was to scrap the co-captaincy enjoyed by Jonny Gray and Henry Pyrgos. Ryan Wilson was picked as Warriors captain for the season.

== Team ==
=== Coaches ===
- Head coach: Dave Rennie
- Assistant coach: Kenny Murray
- Assistant coach: Jonathan Humphreys
- Assistant coach: Jason O'Halloran
- Assistant coach: Mike Blair
- Head Strength and Conditioning Coach: Phil Healey
- Asst. Strength and Conditioning Coach: Francisco Tavares
- Asst. Strength and Conditioning Coach: George Petrakos
- Lead Performance Analyst: Toby West
- Asst. Performance Analyst: Greg Woolard

=== Staff ===
- Managing Director: Nathan Bombrys
- Chairman: Charles Shaw
- Advisory Group: Walter Malcolm, Douglas McCrea, Alan Lees, Jim Preston, Paul Taylor
- Rugby Operations Manager: John Manson
- Kit manager & Masseur: Dougie Mills
- Clinical Manager and Team Physiotherapist: Nicola McGuire
- Rehabilitation Physiotherapist: Gabrielle McCullough
- Team doctor: Dr. David Pugh
- Commercial Operations Manager: Alastair Kellock
- Communications Manager: Jeremy Bone
- Communications Asst: Jack Reid
- Operations manager: Stephanie Karvelis
- Marketing and Partnerships Manager: Darroch Ramsay
- Partnership Sales Manager: Laura Hynd
- Partnership Account Manager: Oliver Norman
- Partnership Account Manager: Jim Taylor
- Game On Project Development Officer: Lindsey Smith
- Community Rugby Coach: Stuart Lewis

=== Squad ===
Hookers: Fraser Brown; Pat MacArthur; James Malcolm; George Turner; Props: Alex Allan; Jamie Bhatti; Zander Fagerson; Ryan Grant; Siua Halanukonuka; Oli Kebble; D'Arcy Rae; Locks: Brian Alainu'uese; Scott Cummings; Jonny Gray; Kiran McDonald; Greg Peterson; Tim Swinson	Loose forwards: Adam Ashe; Matt Fagerson; Chris Fusaro; Callum Gibbins; Rob Harley; Matt Smith; Samuela Vunisa; Ryan Wilson; Lewis Wynne; Scrum halves: George Horne; Nikola Matawalu; Ali Price; Henry Pyrgos; Fly halves: Adam Hastings; Ruaridh Jackson; Finn Russell; Brandon Thomson	Centres: Alex Dunbar; Nick Grigg; Peter Horne; Huw Jones; Patrick Kelly; Sam Johnson; Richie Vernon; Back Three: Robert Beattie; Stuart Hogg; Rory Hughes; Lee Jones; Lelia Masaga; Max McFarland; Leonardo Sarto; Tommy Seymour; Ratu Tagive; D. T. H. van der Merwe

==== BT Sport Scottish Rugby Academy Stage 3 players ====
Scottish Rugby Academy players who have been assigned to a Professional club are Stage 3 players. These players are assigned to*Glasgow Warriors for the season*2017–18. Dan York was added to the Glasgow Stage 3 academy squad in the Scottish Rugby Academy's second intake in the 2017–18 season.

Academy players promoted in the course of the season are listed with the main squad.

- Robbie Smith - Hooker
- Grant Stewart - Hooker
- Euan McLaren - Prop
- Adam Nicol - Prop
- Dan York - Prop
- Hamilton Burr - Lock
- Bruce Flockhart - Flanker (Loan out)
- George Stokes - Flanker
- Kaleem Barreto - Scrum half
- Josh Henderson - Fly-half (Loan out)
- Stafford McDowall - Centre
- Robbie Nairn - Wing
- Sam Yawayawa - Wing

==== Back up players ====
Other players used by Glasgow Warriors over the course of the season.

- Charlie Shiel (Edinburgh) –*Scottish Rugby Academy Stage 3 player -*Scrum half
- Gary Strain (Glasgow Hawks) –*Prop
- Gus Warr (Dollar Academy) -*Scrum half

== Player statistics ==
During the 2017–18 season, Glasgow have used fifty-four different players in competitive games. The table below shows the number of appearances and points scored by each player.

Position	Nation	Name	Pro14			Champions Cup			Total	
Position	Nation	Name	Apps (sub)	Tries	Points kicked	Apps (sub)	Tries	Points kicked	Apps (sub)	Total pts
Hooker	Scotland	Fraser Brown	7(1)	1	0	2	1	0	9(1)	10
Hooker	Scotland	Pat MacArthur	4(5)	0	0	(2)	0	0	4(7)	0
Hooker	Scotland	James Malcolm	3(3)	0	0	(1)	0	0	3(4)	0
Hooker	Scotland	Grant Stewart	(5)	0	0	(2)	0	0	(7)	0
Hooker	Scotland	George Turner	8(6)	2	0	4(1)	1	0	12(7)	15
Prop	Scotland	Alex Allan	10(7)	0	0	(6)	0	0	10(13)	0
Prop	Scotland	Jamie Bhatti	10(5)	0	0	6	0	0	16(5)	0
Prop	Scotland	Zander Fagerson	13(2)	2	0	4	0	0	17(2)	10
Prop	Scotland	Ryan Grant	(3)	0	0	0	0	0	(3)	0
Prop	Tonga	Siua Halanukonuka	5(8)	1	0	2(2)	0	0	7(10)	5
Prop	South Africa	Oli Kebble	2(7)	0	0	0	0	0	2(7)	0
Prop	Scotland	Adam Nicol	(4)	0	0	0	0	0	(4)	0
Prop	Scotland	D'Arcy Rae	4(7)	0	0	(4)	0	0	4(11)	0
Lock	Samoa	Brian Alainu'uese	1(4)	0	0	0	0	0	1(4)	0
Lock	Scotland	Hamilton Burr	(2)	0	0	0	0	0	(2)	0
Lock	Scotland	Scott Cummings	16(1)	3	0	1(3)	0	0	17(4)	15
Lock	Scotland	Jonny Gray	8	1	0	5	0	0	13	5
Lock	Scotland	Kiran McDonald	4(5)	0	0	1(2)	0	0	5(7)	0
Lock	United States	Greg Peterson	2(4)	0	0	1(1)	0	0	3(5)	0
Lock	Scotland	Tim Swinson	12(1)	0	0	2	0	0	14(1)	0
Back row	Scotland	Adam Ashe	6(2)	1	0	4	1	0	10(2)	10
Back-row	Scotland	Matt Fagerson	13(3)	1	0	2	1	0	15(3)	10
Back-row	Scotland	Chris Fusaro	4(9)	0	0	(4)	0	0	4(13)	0
Back-row	New Zealand	Callum Gibbins	13	6	0	2	0	0	15	30
Back-row	Scotland	Rob Harley	13(4)	2	0	2(2)	0	0	15(6)	10
Back-row	Scotland	Matt Smith	7(4)	1	0	4	0	0	11(4)	5
Back-row	Italy	Samuela Vunisa	2(1)	1	0	2	0	0	4(1)	5
Back-row	Scotland	Ryan Wilson	9	0	0	4	0	0	13	0
Back-row	Scotland	Lewis Wynne	(4)	0	0	0	0	0	(4)	0
Scrum-half	Scotland	Kaleem Barreto	(1)	0	0	0	0	0	(1)	0
Scrum-half	Scotland	George Horne	9(4)	9	0	1(3)	1	0	10(7)	50
Scrum-half	Fiji	Nikola Matawalu	5(8)	3	0	1(3)	2	0	6(11)	25
Scrum-half	Scotland	Ali Price	8(2)	1	0	5(1)	0	0	13(3)	5
Scrum-half	Scotland	Henry Pyrgos	5(14)	6	0	(3)	0	0	5(17)	30
Fly-half	Scotland	Adam Hastings	6(3)	1	54	0	0	0	6(3)	59
Fly-half	Scotland	Ruaridh Jackson	17(2)	4	4	4	0	0	21(2)	24
Fly-half	Scotland	Finn Russell	10(2)	0	81	4(1)	0	28	14(3)	109
Fly-half	South Africa	Brandon Thomson	2(4)	2	5	(1)	0	2	2(5)	17
Centre	Scotland	Alex Dunbar	9(1)	4	0	2	0	0	11(1)	20
Centre	Scotland	Nick Grigg	15(2)	6	0	3(1)	1	0	18(3)	35
Centre	Scotland	Peter Horne	8(8)	1	64	4(2)	1	6	12(10)	80
Centre	Scotland	Huw Jones	3(1)	1	0	3	0	0	6(1)	5
Centre	Scotland	Patrick Kelly	(1)	0	0	0	0	0	(1)	0
Centre	Australia	Sam Johnson	13(1)	2	0	2(1)	0	0	15(2)	10
Centre	Scotland	Stafford McDowall	(1)	0	0	0	0	0	(1)	0
Centre	Scotland	Richie Vernon	(1)	0	0	0	0	0	(1)	0
Wing	Scotland	Rory Hughes	2	0	0	0	0	0	2	0
Wing	Scotland	Lee Jones	14(2)	7	0	3(2)	1	0	17(4)	40
Wing	New Zealand	Lelia Masaga	5(3)	1	0	0	0	0	5(3)	5
Wing	Italy	Leonardo Sarto	3(4)	4	0	3	2	0	6(4)	30
Wing	Scotland	Tommy Seymour	8	1	0	5	3	0	13	20
Wing	Australia	Ratu Tagive	2(1)	0	0	0	0	0	2(1)	0
Wing	Canada	D. T. H. van der Merwe	5	3	0	0	0	0	5	15
Full-back	Scotland	Stuart Hogg	5	2	0	2	2	0	7	20

== Staff movements ==
=== Coaches ===
==== Personnel in ====
- Dave Rennie from Chiefs
- Jonathan Humphreys from Scotland
- Jason O'Halloran from Scotland
- Phil Healey from Chiefs
- Francisco Tavares from Chiefs
- Toby West from Scotland

==== Personnel out ====
- Gregor Townsend to Scotland
- Matt Taylor to Scotland
- Dan McFarland to Scotland
- Stuart Yule to Scotland
- Gavin Vaughan to Scotland
- Thibault Giroud to Toulon

== Player movements ==
=== Academy promotions ===
- Jamie Bhatti from Scottish Rugby Academy
- George Horne from Scottish Rugby Academy
- Patrick Kelly from Scottish Rugby Academy
- Matt Fagerson from Scottish Rugby Academy
- Robert Beattie from Scottish Rugby Academy

=== Player transfers ===
==== In ====
- Oli Kebble from Stormers
- Huw Jones from Stormers
- Callum Gibbins from Hurricanes
- Adam Hastings from Bath Rugby
- Lelia Masaga from Chiefs
- Samuela Vunisa from Saracens
- Kiran McDonald from Hull
- Brandon Thomson from Stormers
- George Turner from Edinburgh Rugby (loan)
- Siua Halanukonuka from Highlanders
- Ruaridh Jackson from Harlequins
- Nikola Matawalu from Exeter Chiefs
- Ryan Grant from Edinburgh Rugby
- Max McFarland from Clontarf
- George Turner from Edinburgh Rugby
- D. T. H. van der Merwe from Newcastle Falcons

==== Out ====
- Mark Bennett to Edinburgh Rugby
- Gordon Reid to London Irish
- Josh Strauss to Sale Sharks
- Simone Favaro to Fiamme Oro
- Djustice Sears-Duru to Ontario Blues
- Sila Puafisi to Brive
- Sean Lamont retired
- Grayson Hart to Ealing Trailfinders
- Tjiuee Uanivi to London Scottish
- Peter Murchie released
- Junior Bulumakau to Doncaster Knights
- Fraser Lyle to London Scottish
- Nemia Kenatale released
- Hagen Schulte to Heidelberger RK
- Corey Flynn released
- Josh Henderson to Stade Niçois (loan out)
- Bruce Flockhart to Stade Niçois (loan out)
- Hugh Blake to Bay of Plenty Steamers
- George Turner to Edinburgh Rugby (loan ends)

== Competitions ==
=== Pre-season and friendlies ===
==== Match 1 ====
19 August 2017
2pm

Glasgow Warriors	14 – 19	Northampton Saints
Try: George Horne; Adam Ashe; Con: Adam Hastings x 2	Preview; Reports	Try: Ahsee Tuala; Alex Mitchell; Tom Collins; Con: Harry Mallinder x 2

Bridgehaugh Park
Attendance: 2532
Referee: Mike Adamson (SRU)

Glasgow Warriors: 15 Rory Hughes, 14 Leonardo Sarto, 13 Paddy Kelly, 12 Sam Johnson, 11 Robbie Nairn, 10 Adam Hastings, 9 George Horne,
1 Jamie Bhatti, 2 James Malcolm, 3 D’arcy Rae, 4 Greg Peterson, 5 Scott Cummings, 6 Matt Fagerson, 7 Matt Smith, 8 Adam Ashe (capt)
Replacements: 16 Alex Allan, 17 Grant Stewart, 18 Adam Nicol, 19 Brian Alainu’uese, 20 Kiran McDonald, 21 George Stokes, 22 Hamilton Burr,
23 Chris Fusaro, 24 Lewis Wynne, 25 Charlie Shiel, 26 Stafford McDowell, 27 Lee Jones, 28 Robert Beattie (all used)
Northampton Saints: Ben Foden (capt), Jamie Elliott, Ahsee Tuala, Luther Burrell, Juan Pablo Estelles, Piers Francis, Nic Groom
Campese Ma’afu, Charlie Clare, Jamal Ford-Robinson, David Ribbans, James Craig, Jamie Gibson, Lewis Ludlam, Mitch Eadie.
Replacements: Dylan Hartley, Alex Waller, Kieran Brookes, Paul Hill, Michael Paterson, Reece Marshall, Christian Day, Ben Nutley,
Teimana Harrison, Alex Mitchell, James Grayson, Rory Hutchinson, Tom Stephenson, Juan Pablo Estelles, George Furbank, Harry Mallinder (all used)

==== Match 2 ====
25 August 2017
2pm

Dragons	23–40	Glasgow Warriors
Try: Charlie Davies; Adam Warren; Con: Angus O'Brien x 2 Pen: Angus O'Brien x 3	Preview; Reports	Try: Rory Hughes; Ruaridh Jackson; Nick Grigg; Scott Cummings; Sam Johnson; Patrick Kelly; Con: Adam Hastings x 2 Peter Horne x 3

Eugene Cross Park
Referee: Craig Evans

Dragons: Zane Kirchner; Ashton Hewitt, Tyler Morgan, Sam Beard, Hallam Amos; Angus O’Brien, Charlie Davies; Brok Harris, Elliot Dee, Leon Brown, Matthew Screech, Ashley Sweet, James Thomas (c), Ollie Griffiths, James Benjamin
Replacements: Rhys Buckley, Thomas Davies, Lloyd Fairbrother, Lennon Greggains, Nic Cudd, Sarel Pretorius,
Dorian Jones, Adam Warren, Adam Hughes, Jarred Rosser, Pat Howard, Mike Snook.
Glasgow Warriors: 15. Ruaridh Jackson, 14. Lee Jones, 13. Nick Grigg, 12. Sam Johnson, 11. Rory Hughes, 10. Adam Hastings, 9. George Horne
1. Jamie Bhatti, 2. James Malcolm, 3. D'arcy Rae, 4. Brian Alainu'uese, 5. Scott Cummings, 6. Lewis Wynne, 7. Chris Fusaro, 8. Adam Ashe (C)
Replacements: 16. George Turner, 17. Gary Strain, 18. Adam Nicol, 19. Greg Peterson, 20. Kiran McDonald, 21. Hamilton Burr,
22. Matt Smith, 23. Matt Fagerson, 24. Henry Pyrgos, 25. Peter Horne, 26. Patrick Kelly, 27. Lelia Masaga, 28. Stafford McDowell

=== Pro14 ===
==== League table ====
2017–18 Pro14 tables
Conference A
	Team	P	W	D	L	PF	PA	PD	TF	TA	TBP	LBP	PTS
1	(Scotland) Glasgow Warriors (SF)	21	15	1	5	614	366	+248	81	38	12	2	76
2	(Ireland) Munster (SF)	21	13	1	7	568	361	+207	78	42	10	5	69
3	(South Africa) Cheetahs (QF)	21	12	0	9	609	554	+55	75	68	10	5	63
4	(Wales) Cardiff Blues	21	11	0	10	502	482	+20	56	59	5	5	54
5	(Wales) Ospreys	21	9	0	12	390	487	−97	44	60	5	3	44
6	(Ireland) Connacht	21	7	0	14	445	477	−32	53	54	5	6	39
7	(Italy) Zebre	21	7	0	14	408	593	–185	50	78	4	4	36
Conference B
	Team	P	W	D	L	PF	PA	PD	TF	TA	TBP	LBP	PTS
1	(Ireland) Leinster (CH)	21	14	1	6	601	374	+227	83	46	10	2	70
2	(Wales) Scarlets (RU)	21	14	1	6	528	365	+163	69	43	9	3	70
3	(Scotland) Edinburgh (QF)	21	15	0	6	494	375	+119	62	44	7	1	68
4	(Ireland) Ulster (PO)	21	12	2	7	538	482	+56	68	61	8	2	62
5	(Italy) Benetton	21	11	0	10	415	451	−36	51	55	6	5	55
6	(Wales) Dragons	21	2	2	17	378	672	−294	43	94	4	4	20
7	(South Africa) Southern Kings	21	1	0	20	378	829	−451	48	119	4	3	11
If teams are level at any stage, tiebreakers are applied in the following order -: 1. number of matches won 2. the difference between points for and points against 3. the number of tries scored 4. the most points scored 5. the difference between tries for and tries against 6. the fewest red cards received 7. the fewest yellow cards received
Green background indicates teams that competed in the Pro14 play-offs, and also earned a place in the 2018–19 European Champions Cup (excluding South African teams who are ineligible); Blue background indicates teams outside the play-off places that earned a place in the 2018–19 European Champions Cup, including the winner of the play-off between the two fourth-ranked European teams in each conference Yellow background indicates the loser of the play-off between the two fourth-ranked European teams in each conference, that earned a place in the 2018–19 European Rugby Challenge Cup. Plain background indicates teams that earned a place in the 2018–19 European Rugby Challenge Cup. (CH) Champions. (RU) Runners-up. (SF) Losing semi-finalists. (QF) Losing quarter-finalists. (PO) Champions Cup play-off winners.

==== Results ====
===== Round 1 =====
2 September 2017
7.35pm

(1 BP) Connacht	12–18	Glasgow Warriors
Pen: Carty (4/4) 1', 19', 40', 60'	Preview; Reports	Try: Price 47' c L. Jones 71' m Con: Horne (1/2) 48'; Pen: Horne (2/3) 11', 45'

Galway Sportsgrounds
Attendance: 4,017
Referee: Ben Whitehouse (WRU)

===== Round 2 =====
9 September 2017
15:15

(1 BP) Glasgow Warriors	31–10	Ospreys
Try: Dunbar (2) 15' c, 77' c Sarto 51' c Ashe 59' c Con: Russell (4/4) 16', 53', 60', 78'; Pen: Russell (1/1) 18'	Preview; Reports	Try: Evans 21' c Con: S. Davies (1/1) 21'; Pen: S. Davies (1/2) 40'

Scotstoun Stadium
Attendance: 7,351
Referee: Marius Mitrea (FIR)

===== Round 3 =====
16 September 2017
19:35

(1 BP) Cardiff Blues	19–20	Glasgow Warriors
Try: James 7' c Con: Shingler (1/1) 8'; Pen: Shingler (4/5) 12', 25', 41', 47'		Try: Pyrgos 30' c L. Jones 42' c Con: Russell (2/2) 31', 43'; Pen: Russell (2/2) 16', 67'

Cardiff Arms Park
Attendance: 5,374
Referee: Frank Murphy (IRFU)

===== Round 4 =====
22 September 2017
19:35

(1 BP) Glasgow Warriors	37–10	Munster
Try: Sarto 3' c Jones 35' c Grigg 44' c Cummings 62' c Con: Russell (4/4) 4', 37', 45', 64'; Pen: Russell (3/3) 9', 34', 55'		Try: R. Scannell 14' m Farrell 47' m

Scotstoun Stadium
Attendance: 7351
Referee: Nigel Owens (WRU)

===== Round 5 =====
29 September 2017
19:35

(1 BP) Glasgow Warriors	37–21	Benetton
Try: Seymour 9' c Harley 25' c P. Horne 53' c Johnson 80' c Con: P. Horne (3/3) 9', 25', 54'; Thomson (1/1) 80'; Pen: P. Horne (2/2) 16', 49'; Thomson (1/1) 71'		Try: Lazzaroni 56' m Ruzza 67' c Con: Banks (1/2) 68'; Pen: Banks (3/4) 22', 28', 40'

Scotstoun Stadium
Attendance: 7351
Referee: Dan Jones (WRU)

===== Round 6 =====
6 October 2017
8.35pm

(1 BP) Cheetahs	26–29	Glasgow Warriors (1 BP)
Try: Petersen 11' c Specman 39' c Con: Stapelberg (2/2) 12', 40'; Pen: Stapelberg (4/4) 28', 57', 65', 75'		Try: Gibbins (2) 32' c, 52' c Pyrgos 69' c Harley 76' m Con: Russell (3/4) 33', 54', 70'; Pen: Russell (1/1) 2'

Toyota Stadium
Referee: George Clancy (IRFU)

===== Round 7 =====
27 October 2017
7.35pm

(1 BP) Glasgow Warriors	43–13	Southern Kings
Try: Hogg 1' m Matawalu 31' c Grigg 34' c Fagerson 58' m M. Smith 65' m G. Horne 71' c Turner 80' c Con: Hastings (2/4) 32', 34'; Jackson (2/3) 72', 80'		Try: Nel 75' c Con: Zono (1/1) 75'; Pen: Banda (2/2) 12', 21'

Scotstoun Stadium
Attendance: 7,351
Referee: Mike Adamson (SRU)

===== Round 8 =====
3 November 2017
7.35pm

(1 BP) Glasgow Warriors	31–21	Leinster
Try: G. Horne (2) 6', 21' c Grigg (2) 14' c, 23' c Con: P. Horne (4/4) 8', 15', 21', 24'; Pen: P. Horne (1/1) 33'		Try: Gibson-Park 4' c O'Loughlin 10' c A. Byrne 46' c Con: R. Byrne (3/3) 5', 12', 47'

Scotstoun Stadium
Attendance: 7,351
Referee: Stuart Berry (SARU)

===== Round 9 =====
26 November 2017
1pm

Ospreys	6–47	Glasgow Warriors (1 BP)
Pen: S. Davies (2/2) 2', 29'		Try: Hastings 13' c G. Horne (2) 26' c, 53' c Cummings 42' m Turner 46' c Thomson 76' c Sarto 80' c Con: Hastings (6/7) 13', 27', 47', 54', 77', 80'

Liberty Stadium
Attendance: 4,362
Referee: Ian Davies (WRU)

===== Round 10 =====
1 December 2017
7.35pm

(1 BP) Glasgow Warriors	40–16	Cardiff Blues
Try: Johnson 18' c Dunbar 31' c Jackson 54' c Vunisa 67' c Sarto 76' m Matawalu 79' c Con: P. Horne (5/6) 19', 32', 55', 67', 80'	Report	Try: Cook 6' c Con: Evans (1/1) 8'; Pen: Evans (3/3) 1', 22', 47'

Scotstoun Stadium
Attendance: 7,351
Referee: Nigel Owens (WRU)

===== Round 11 - 1872 Cup 1st leg =====
23 December 2017
5.10pm

Edinburgh	18–17	Glasgow Warriors (1 BP)
Try: Fowles 60' c Dean 78' m Con: Van der Walt (1/2) 61'; Pen: Hidalgo-Clyne (2/2) 17', 50'	Report	Try: H. Jones 1' c Cummings 55' c Con: P. Horne (1/1) 2'; Russell (1/1) 56'; Pen: P. Horne (1/1) 47'

Murrayfield Stadium
Attendance: 23,833
Referee: Frank Murphy (IRFU)

===== Round 12 - 1872 Cup 2nd leg =====
30 December 2017
3.15pm

Glasgow Warriors	17–0	Edinburgh
Try: L. Jones 80' m Pen: Russell (4/4) 5', 42', 57', 73'	Report

Scotstoun Stadium
Attendance: 7,351
Referee: Mike Adamson (SRU)

===== Round 13 =====
6 January 2018
4.30pm

Zebre	20–40	Glasgow Warriors (1 BP)
Try: Giammarioli 9' c Mbanda 42' m D'Apice 60' m Con: Canna (1/2) 10'; Pen: Violi (1/1) 33'	Report	Try: Fagerson 6' c L. Jones (2) 20' c, 53' c Penalty try 28'; G. Horne 40' m Grigg 62' c Con: Russell (4/5) 7', 20', 54', 63'

Stadio Sergio Lanfranchi
Attendance: 2,000
Referee: Andrew Brace (IRFU)

===== Round 14 =====
9 February 2018
7.35pm

Dragons	15–15	Glasgow Warriors
Try: Belcher 1' m Rosser 37' c Con: Kirchner (1/2) 38'; Pen: Kirchner (1/2) 36'	Report	Try: Thomson 14' m G. Horne 23' c Con: Hastings (1/1) 24'; Pen: Hastings (1/1) 19'

Rodney Parade
Attendance: 4,159
Referee: Andrew Brace (IRFU)

===== Round 15 =====
16 February 2018
7.35pm

(1 BP) Glasgow Warriors	37–23	Cheetahs
Try: Matawalu 12' c Jackson 19' m Halanukonuka 50' m G. Horne 57' c Pyrgos 68' c Con: Hastings (3/5) 13', 58', 69'; Pen: Hastings (2/2) 34', 67'	Report	Try: Jaer 8' c Blommetjies 63' c Con: Marais (2/2) 9', 64'; Pen: Marais (3/3) 40', 45', 53'

Scotstoun Stadium
Attendance: 7,351
Referee: George Clancy (IRFU)

===== Round 16 =====
23 February 2018
7pm

Munster	21–10	Glasgow Warriors
Try: N. Scannell 24' c Cronin 48' m Con: Bleyendaal (1/2) 24'; Pen: Bleyendaal (3/4) 10', 34', 61'	Report	Try: G. Horne 46' c Con: Hastings (1/1) 47'; Pen: Hastings (1/1) 42'

Irish Independent Park
Attendance: 8,008
Referee: Marius Mitrea (FIR)

===== Round 17 =====
21 April 2018
6.05pm

(1 BP) Ulster	36–15	Glasgow Warriors
Try: Cooney 11' c Timoney (2) 54' c, 82' m Reidy 60' m Con: Cooney (1/1) 12'; McPhillips (1/2) 56'; Pen: Cooney (3/3) 4', 39', 40'; McPhillips (1/1) 68'	Report	Try: Gibbins (2) 21' c, 46' m Con: Russell (1/2) 21'; Pen: Russell (1/1) 18'

Kingspan Stadium
Attendance: 16,186
Referee: Stuart Berry (SARU)

- Match rescheduled from 2 March 2018.

===== Round 18 =====
23 March 2018
19:35

(1 BP) Glasgow Warriors	68–7	Zebre
Try: Van der Merwe (2) 7' c, 26' c Jackson (2) 11' c, 38' m Penalty try 23'; Pyrgos 32' c L. Jones 41' c Fagerson 51' c Gibbins 57' c Masaga 65' c Con: A. Hastings (8/9) 8', 12', 27', 33', 42', 53', 59', 66'	Report	Try: Canna 49' c Con: Canna (1/1) 50'

Scotstoun Stadium
Attendance: 7,351
Referee: Craig Evans (WRU)

===== Round 19 =====
7 April 2018
4.15pm

Scarlets	26–8	Glasgow Warriors
Try: Patchell (2) 27' m, 78' c G. Davies 54' m Con: Halfpenny (1/3) 80'; Pen: Halfpenny (3/4) 33', 53', 59'	Report	Try: Pyrgos 61' m Pen: P. Horne (1/2) 42'

Parc y Scarlets
Attendance: 10,076
Referee: George Clancy (IRFU)

===== Round 20 =====
13 April 2018
7.35pm

(1 BP) Glasgow Warriors	35–22	Connacht
Try: Hogg 3' c Dunbar 26' c Brown 40' c Pyrgos 43' m Con: P. Horne (3/4) 4', 27', 40'; Pen: P. Horne (3/3) 7', 13', 21'	Report	Try: Bealham 1' m Blade 67' c Penalty try 75'; Con: J. Carty (1/2) 68'; Pen: J. Carty (1/1) 24'

Scotstoun Stadium
Attendance: 7,351
Referee: Frank Murphy (IRFU)

===== Round 21 - 1872 Cup 3rd leg =====
28 April 2018
7.45pm

Edinburgh	24–19	Glasgow Warriors (1 BP)
Try: Johnstone 18' c Lay 34' c van der Merwe 40'c Con: Hidalgo-Clyne (3/3) 19', 36', 40+2'; Pen: Weir (1/1) 66'	Report	Try: van der Merwe (2) 11' c, 68' m Gibbins; Con: Russell (2/3) 12', 22'

Murrayfield Stadium
Attendance: 25,353
Referee: Nigel Owens (WRU)

Edinburgh won the 1872 Cup with a series score of 2 - 1.

==== Play-offs ====
===== Semi-finals =====
18 May 2018
19:45

Glasgow Warriors	13–28	Scarlets
Try: Gray 59' m Grigg 72' m Pen: Russell (1/1) 13'		Try: Patchell 3' c G. Davies 16' c R. Evans 31' c Owens 47' c Con: Patchell (4/4) 4', 17', 32', 48'

Scotstoun Stadium
Attendance: 10,000
Referee: John Lacey (IRFU)

=== Europe ===
In the European Rugby Champions Cup pool stage, Glasgow Warriors were placed as Tier 4 seeds and drawn with the English champions Exeter Chiefs, the French side Montpellier coached by former Scotland boss Vern Cotter and Irish side Leinster. The fixtures were announced on 22 August 2017.

==== Pool ====
Team	P	W	D	L	PF	PA	Diff	TF	TA	TB	LB	Pts
(Ireland) Leinster (1)	6	6	0	0	176	93	+83	22	12	3	0	27
(England) Exeter Chiefs	6	3	0	3	138	117	+21	18	14	1	2	15
(France) Montpellier	6	2	0	4	130	163	–33	18	23	3	2	13
(Scotland) Glasgow Warriors	6	1	0	5	128	199	–71	18	27	2	1	7

==== Results ====
===== Round 1 =====
14 October 2017
7.45pm

Exeter Chiefs	24–15	Glasgow Warriors
Try: Williams 17' c J. Hill 26' c S. Simmonds 77' c Con: Steenson (3/3) 17', 26', 78'; Pen: Steenson (1/2) 42'		Try: Seymour 9' c L. Jones 43' m Con: Russell (1/2) 11'; Pen: Russell (1/1) 6'

Sandy Park
Attendance: 10,672
Referee: Alexandre Ruiz (FFR)

===== Round 2 =====
21 October 2017
1pm

Glasgow Warriors	18–34	Leinster (1 BP)
Try: Hogg 16' c Seymour 49' m Con: Russell (1/2) 16'; Pen: Russell (2/2) 15', 64'		Try: Healy (2) 24' c, 40' c Sexton 45' c Reid 76' c Con: Sexton (3/3) 24', 40', 45'; R. Byrne (1/1) 76'; Pen: Sexton (2/2) 3', 68'

Scotstoun Stadium
Attendance: 7,351
Referee: Jérôme Garcès (FFR)

===== Round 3 =====
8 December 2017
7.45pm

(1 BP) Glasgow Warriors	22–29	Montpellier (1 BP)
Try: Sarto (2) 12' c, 57' m Turner 22' c Con: Russell (2/3) 13', 24'; Pen: Russell (1/1) 3'	Report	Try: Galletier (2) 9' m, 32' c Penalty try 37'; WHJ. du Plessis 47' c Con: Steyn (2/3) 33', 48'; Pen: Steyn (1/1) 70'

Scotstoun Stadium
Attendance: 7,351
Referee: Matthew Carley (RFU)

===== Round 4 =====
16 December 2017
2pm

(1 BP) Montpellier	36–26	Glasgow Warriors (1 BP)
Try: Nadolo 6' c Ruffenach 15' c Immelman (2) 44' c, 66' c Paillaugue 47' m Con: Paillaugue (4/5) 6', 16', 45', 67'; Pen: Steyn (1/1) 77'	Report	Try: Brown 1' c P. Horne 12' c Grigg 18' m G. Horne 69' c Con: P. Horne (3/4) 2', 13', 70'

Altrad Stadium
Attendance: 11,000
Referee: JP Doyle (RFU)

===== Round 5 =====
14 January 2018
1pm

(1 BP) Leinster	55–19	Glasgow Warriors
Try: Murphy 7' c Nacewa (2) 20' c, 56' c Cronin 31' c Fardy (2) 34' m, 77' c Sexton 38' m Lowe 67' c Con: Sexton (3/4) 8', 20', 32'; R. Byrne (3/3) 57', 68', 78'; Pen: Sexton (1/1) 23'	Report	Try: Matawalu (2) 16' c, 70' c Ashe 61' m Con: P. Horne (1/2) 17'; Thomson (1/1) 71'

RDS Arena
Attendance: 15,947
Referee: Marius Mitrea (FIR)

===== Round 6 =====
20 January 2018
1pm

(1 BP) Glasgow Warriors	28–21	Exeter Chiefs (1 BP)
Try: Hogg 1' c Penalty try 52'; Seymour 59' c Fagerson 61' c Con: Russell (3/3) 1', 60', 62'	Report	Try: S. Simmonds 38' c Armand 65' c Whitten 68' c Con: Steenson (3/3) 39', 65', 69'

Scotstoun Stadium
Attendance: 7,351
Referee: Romain Poite (FFR)

== Warrior of the month awards ==
Award	Winner
September	(New Zealand) Callum Gibbins
October	(New Zealand) Callum Gibbins
November	(Scotland) George Horne
December	(Scotland) Ruaridh Jackson
January	(Scotland) George Horne
February	(Scotland) Nick Grigg
March	(Scotland) Adam Hastings
April	no award
May	no award

== End of Season awards ==
Award	Winner
Young Player of the Season	George Horne
Coaches Award	Chris Fusaro
Test Player of the Season	Jonny Gray
Most Improved Player of the Season	Matt Fagerson
Al Kellock Leadership Award	Callum Gibbins & Peter Horne
Community Club of the Season	Dumfries Saints
Try of the Season	Tommy Seymour vs. Exeter Chiefs
Players' Player of the Season	Sam Johnson & Ruaridh Jackson
Player of the Season	George Horne

== Competitive debuts this season ==
A player's nationality shown is taken from the nationality at the highest honour for the national side obtained; or if never capped internationally their place of birth. Senior caps take precedence over junior caps or place of birth; junior caps take precedence over place of birth. A player's nationality at debut may be different from the nationality shown. Combination sides like the British and Irish Lions or Pacific Islanders are not national sides, or nationalities.

Players in BOLD font have been capped by their senior international XV side as nationality shown.

Players in Italic font have capped either by their international 7s side; or by the international XV 'A' side as nationality shown.

Players in normal font have not been capped at senior level.

A position in parentheses indicates that the player debuted as a substitute. A player may have made a prior debut for Glasgow Warriors in a non-competitive match, 'A' match or 7s match; these matches are not listed.

Tournaments where competitive debut made:

**Scottish Inter-District Championship**	**Welsh–Scottish League**	**WRU Challenge Cup**	**Celtic League**	**Celtic Cup**	**1872 Cup**	**Pro12**	**Pro14**	**Rainbow Cup**	**United Rugby Championship**	**European Challenge Cup**	**Heineken Cup / European Champions Cup**

Crosshatching indicates a jointly hosted match.

Number	Player nationality	Name	Position	Date of debut	Venue	Stadium	Opposition nationality	Opposition side	Tournament	Match result	Scoring debut
283	Scotland	**George Turner**	Hooker	2017-09-02	Away	Galway Sportsgrounds	Ireland	Connacht	Pro14	Win	Nil
284	New Zealand	**Lelia Masaga**	Wing	2017-09-02	Away	Galway Sportsgrounds	Ireland	Connacht	Pro14	Win	Nil
285	Scotland	**Oli Kebble**	(Prop)	2017-09-02	Away	Galway Sportsgrounds	Ireland	Connacht	Pro14	Win	Nil
286	Scotland	**Adam Hastings**	(Fly half)	2017-09-02	Away	Galway Sportsgrounds	Ireland	Connacht	Pro14	Win	Nil
287	New Zealand	Callum Gibbins	Flanker	2017-09-09	Home	Scotstoun Stadium	Wales	Ospreys	Pro14	Win	Nil
288	Scotland	Stafford McDowall	(Centre)	2017-10-27	Home	Scotstoun Stadium	South Africa	Southern Kings	Pro14	Win	Nil
289	Scotland	Kiran McDonald	Lock	2017-11-26	Away	Liberty Stadium	Wales	Ospreys	Pro14	Win	Nil
290	Italy	**Samuela Vunisa**	No. 8	2017-11-26	Away	Liberty Stadium	Wales	Ospreys	Pro14	Win	Nil
291	Tonga	**Siua Halanukonuka**	(Prop)	2017-11-26	Away	Liberty Stadium	Wales	Ospreys	Pro14	Win	Nil
292	Scotland	Hamilton Burr	(Lock)	2017-11-26	Away	Liberty Stadium	Wales	Ospreys	Pro14	Win	Nil
293	Scotland	Kaleem Barreto	(Scrum half)	2017-11-26	Away	Liberty Stadium	Wales	Ospreys	Pro14	Win	Nil
294	Scotland	**Huw Jones**	Centre	2017-12-08	Home	Scotstoun Stadium	France	Montpellier	European Champions Cup	Loss	Nil
295	Scotland	**Grant Stewart**	(Hooker)	2018-01-14	Away	RDS Arena	Ireland	Leinster	European Champions Cup	Loss	Nil

== Sponsorship ==
- SP Energy Networks - Title Sponsor and Community Sponsor
- Scottish Power - Official Kit

=== Official kit supplier ===
- Macron

=== Official kit sponsors ===
- Malcolm Group
- McCrea Financial Services
- Denholm Oilfield
- Ross Hall Hospital
- Story Contracting

=== Official sponsors ===
- The Famous Grouse
- Clyde Travel Management
- Harper Macleod
- Caledonia Best
- Eden Mill Brewery and Distillery
- David Lloyd Leisure
- Crabbie's
- Cala Homes
- Capital Solutions
- Martha's Restaurant
- Sterling Furniture

=== Official partners ===
- A.G. Barr
- Benchmarx
- Black & Lizars
- Cameron House
- Glasgow Airport
- Healthspan Elite
- Mentholatum
- MSC Nutrition
- Smile Plus
- Lenco Utilities
- Scot JCB News Scotland
- HF Group
- Primestaff
- Village Hotel Club
- The Crafty Pig
- Kooltech
- Savills
- iPro Sports
- RHA
