= Hamilton Burr =

Scottish rugby union player

- Born: Hamilton Burr; 19 June 1996 (age 30) Aberdeen, Scotland
- Height: 6 ft 4 in (1.93 m)
- Weight: 231 lb (105 kg)
- School: Hazlehead

Rugby union career
- Position: Flanker
Amateur team(s)
| Years | Team | Apps | (Points) |
| - | Aberdeen Wanderers | | |
| – | Aberdeen GSFP | | |
| – | Stirling County | | |
Senior career
| Years | Team | Apps | (Points) |
| 2017 | Glasgow Warriors | 1 | (0) |
| 2022, 2024 | Chiefs | 3 | (5) |
Provincial / State sides
| Years | Team | Apps | (Points) |
| 2019 - | Waikato | 52 | (0) |
Coaching career
- Years: Team
- -: Aberdeen Wanderers (Youth coach)
- –: Stirling County (Youth coach)

Hamilton Burr (born 19 June 1996) is a Scottish professional rugby union player who plays for Waikato in the Bunnings NPC. He previously was a Stage 3 Scottish Rugby Academy player assigned to Glasgow Warriors. His usual position is at flanker.

== Rugby Union career ==
=== Amateur career ===
Burr started his rugby career playing mini-rugby and playing for Aberdeen Wanderers.

He then moved to Gordonstoun, playing rugby for the school.

After a year in Australia, Burr returned to Scotland and played for Aberdeen Grammar.

He has also played for the Caledonia academy side. He has also played for a cross-academy select 7s side. The Scottish Rugby Academy side won the Glasgow City 7s tournament.

He has played for one of the two Glasgow Warriors Under 17 sides; the Blacks.

He played for Stirling County. He was named County's Player of the Season for 2016-17.

=== Professional career ===
From Gordonstoun, Burr spent a year working with the Melbourne Rebels.

He trained with Glasgow Warriors in the 2016-17 season. Burr stated: "They took me in for training last November because they were short of players and it went from there. I’m not the flashiest player you will ever see but what my academy manager and coaches have said to me is that I’m quite a quick learner. When I was with Glasgow last season during the November Tests and Six Nations windows, I was picking up new things all the time, and able to apply that to my club performances."

Burr graduated to be a Stage 3 player in the BT Sport Scottish Rugby Academy. Stage 3 players are aligned to a professional club and given regional support.

He made his debut for Glasgow Warriors in their opening match of the 2017-18 season - against Northampton Saints at Bridgehaugh Park, Stirling on the 19 August 2017. Burr followed that up by another appearance versus the Dragons at Ebbw Vale. He was the Warriors 24th man for the opening Pro14 match against Connacht but was not needed.

He made his competitive debut for the Warriors away against the Ospreys in the Pro14 on 26 November 2017. He came on as a replacement for Kiran McDonald in a 7 try demolition of the Welsh side. He similarly was a replacement the following week in the match against Cardiff Blues.

=== International career ===
Burr has played for the Scotland U20s

He was in the 2019 Scotland Club XV squad.

=== Coaching career ===
Burr coached youth rugby with Aberdeen Wanderers. He now coaches youth rugby with Stirling County.
