= Stafford McDowall =

Scottish rugby union player (born 1998)

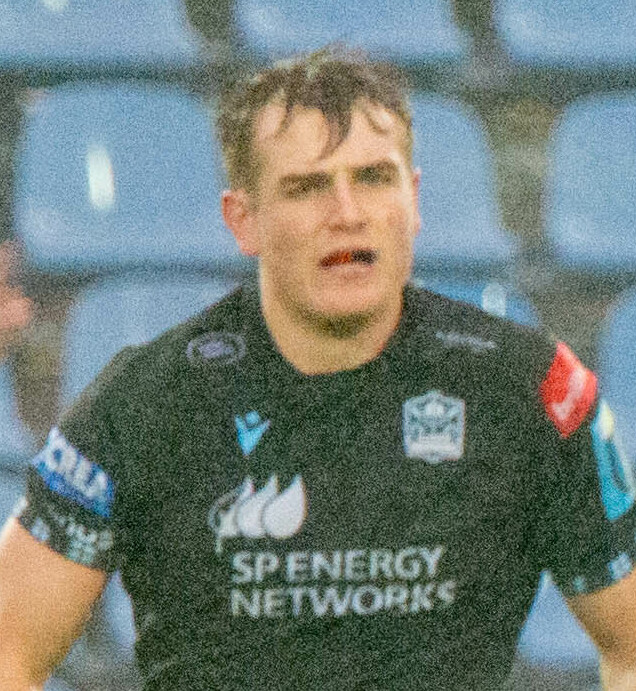
- McDowall representing Glasgow Warriors during the United Rugby Championship
- Full name: Kenneth Stafford Iain McDowall
- Born: 24 February 1998 (age 28) Dumfries, Scotland
- Height: 1.93 m (6 ft 4 in)
- Weight: 103 kg (227 lb; 16 st 3 lb)
- School: Kirkcudbright Academy; Merchiston Castle School

Rugby union career
- Position: Centre
- Current team: Glasgow Warriors
Senior career
Years	Team	Apps	(Points)
2018–	Glasgow Warriors	124	(125)
- Correct as of 30 October 2026
International career
Years	Team	Apps	(Points)
2017–2018	Scotland U20	10	(5)
2023–	Scotland	20	(15)
2024–	Scotland A	1	(0)
- Correct as of 18 November 2026

Kenneth Stafford Iain McDowall (born 24 February 1998) is a Scottish professional rugby union player who plays as a centre for United Rugby Championship club Glasgow Warriors and the Scotland national team.

== Club career ==
McDowall started his rugby career at Kirkcudbright Academy Stewartry RFC then Merchiston Castle School. He made a Glasgow Warriors U17 side in August 2014. From there, he played for Edinburgh U18 and then switched back to play for Glasgow U20.

McDowall now plays for Glasgow Warriors.

He entered the Scottish Rugby Academy in season 2016-17 as a Stage 1-2 player.

He graduated to the Stage 3 professional phase of the academy in the 2017-18 season. He was assigned Ayr in the Pro draft for the Scottish Premiership sides from Glasgow Warriors for the season 2017-18.

McDowall was enrolled in the BT Sport Scottish Rugby Academy as a Stage 3 player. Stage 3 players are aligned to a professional club and given regional support.

He made his debut for Glasgow Warriors in their opening match of the 2017-18 season - against Northampton Saints at Bridgehaugh Park, Stirling on 19 August 2017.

He made his first appearance for season 2018-19 for the Warriors in their 50 -17 demolition of Harlequins at North Inch, Perth on 18 August 2018.

He graduated from the Academy and signed his first professional contract with Glasgow Warriors on 12 December 2018.

== International career ==
He played for Scotland U18s in a home v Scottish Exiles match in February 2016. He has also played for Scotland U18s against Wales U18.

McDowall played for Scotland U19 (Development XV) in 2016 against Georgia U20. He scored 2 tries in the match.

In January 2019, McDowall was named in Scotland's Six Nations squad.

He received his first senior cap on 29 July 2023, playing against Italy in a 25-13 win.
