= Robbie Nairn =

Scottish rugby union player

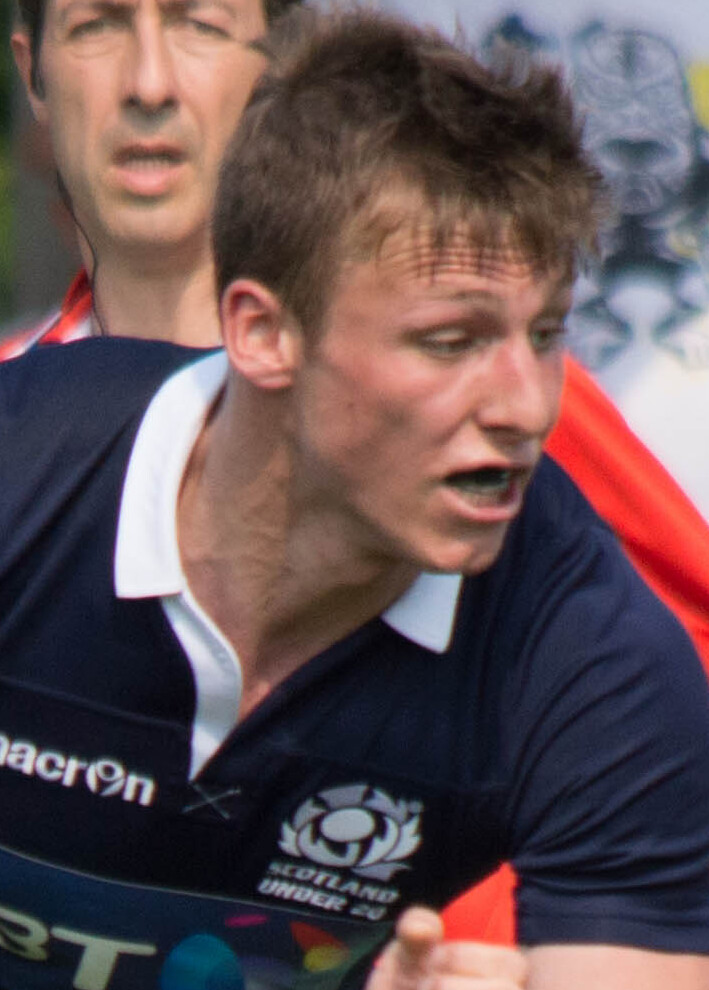
- Nairn at the 2015 World Rugby Under 20 Championship
- Born: Robbie Peter Nairn; 18 February 1997 (age 29) Livingston, Scotland
- Height: 1.92 m (6 ft 4 in)
- Weight: 101 kg (15 st 13 lb; 223 lb)
- School: Currie Community High School; George Watson's College

Rugby union career
- Position: Wing
Amateur team(s)
| Years | Team | Apps | (Points) |
- Currie
- Esher
| 2018- | Ayr | | |
Senior career
| Years | Team | Apps | (Points) |
| 2015-17 | Harlequins | 11 | (5) |
| | → London Welsh | 9 | (45) |
| 2017-21 | Glasgow Warriors | 5 | (10) |
Super Rugby
| Years | Team | Apps | (Points) |
| 2021- | Ayrshire Bulls | 7 | (0) |
International career
| Years | Team | Apps | (Points) |
| 2013 | Scotland U16 | | |
- Scotland U18
| 2014-17 | Scotland U20 | 16 | (30) |
National sevens team
| Years | Team | | Comps |
| 2016– | Scotland 7s | | 2 |

Robbie Nairn (born 18 February 1997) is a Scotland 7s international rugby union player who plays for Ayrshire Bulls. His usual position is at the wing position.

== Rugby union career ==
=== Amateur career ===
Nairn started his rugby union career playing with Currie. As part of the Currie U15 side they won the Edinburgh and District League and Cup in the 2011-12 season. A year later the Currie U16 won the similar honours.

He entered the Scottish Rugby Academy at the Stage 3 professional phase of the academy in the 2017-18 season.

Nairn has been drafted to Ayr in the Scottish Premiership for the 2018-19 season.

=== Professional career ===
Nairn joined Harlequins in 2015. He was loaned out to Esher for game time and then loaned out to London Welsh.

Nairn was enrolled in the BT Sport Scottish Rugby Academy as a Stage 3 player. Stage 3 players are aligned to a professional club and given regional support. Nairn was assigned to Glasgow Warriors.

He made his debut for Glasgow Warriors in their opening match of the 2017-18 season - against Northampton Saints at Bridgehaugh Park, Stirling on 19 August 2017.

Nairn graduated from the Scottish Rugby Academy to earn a professional contract with Glasgow Warriors on 7 June 2018. He has earned a one-year deal with the club.

He made his first appearance for the 2018-19 season for the Warriors in their 50-17 demolition of Harlequins at North Inch, Perth on 18 August 2018.

He was signed by Ayrshire Bulls on 22 June 2021.

=== International career ===
Nairn played for Scotland U18 and was then picked for the Scotland U20 side despite still being eligible for the U18s.

He has been capped for Scotland 7s in 2016.
