= Robert Beattie (rugby union) =

Scottish rugby union player

- Born: Robert Beattie; 30 August 1993 (age 33)
- Height: 1.86 m (6 ft 1 in)
- Weight: 90 kg (14 st 2 lb)
- School: Glasgow Academy
- University: Strathclyde University

Rugby union career
- Position: Wing
Amateur team(s)
Years	Team	Apps	(Points)
2014-18	Glasgow Hawks		
Senior career
Years	Team	Apps	(Points)
2016-18	Glasgow Warriors	27	(30)
2018-21	London Scottish	19	(15)
Super Rugby
Years	Team	Apps	(Points)
2021-	Ayrshire Bulls	15	(10)
International career
Years	Team	Apps	(Points)
2026	Scotland Club XV	1	(0)
National sevens team
Years	Team		Comps
2016–	Scotland 7s		5

Robert Beattie (born 30 August 1993 in Scotland) is a Scotland 7s international rugby union footballer who currently plays as a wing for Ayrshire Bulls. He previously played for Glasgow Warriors, London Scottish and Glasgow Hawks.

== Rugby union career ==
=== Amateur career ===
Beattie played for Glasgow Hawks. The deal Beattie signed for the Warriors on 28 September 2017 is a partnership deal with Glasgow Hawks to the end of the 2017–18 season.

=== Professional career ===
Beattie was awarded a place in the Scottish Rugby Academy for season 2016-17. He was a Stage 3 player for Glasgow and the West regional academy and assigned to Glasgow Warriors.

Beattie made his debut for Glasgow Warriors on 30 August 2016. He played at Bridgehaugh Park for the Warriors against Canada 'A'.

He played again for Glasgow Warriors in their opening match of the 2017-18 season - against Northampton Saints at Bridgehaugh Park, Stirling on 19 August 2017.

He signed for the Warriors on 28 September 2017 in a partnership deal to the end of the 2017–18 season.

On 10 December 2018 it was announced that Beattie had signed for London Scottish.

On 2 July 2021 the Ayrshire Bulls unveiled Beattie as their new signing to play in the Super 6.

=== International career ===
Beattie was called up to the Scotland 7s squad for the World Rugby HSBC Sevens-Series in Cape Town as injury cover for Gavin Lowe who dislocated his shoulder.

He made his debut for Scotland 7s in their match against Uganda 7s on 10 December 2016 in a 38 - 7 win.

He followed that up on the same day with another cap for Scotland 7s against Wales 7s. Scotland won the match 24-21 and set up a Cup Quarter Final against USA 7s.

He played for Scotland Club XV on 13 February 2026 against Ireland Club XV in Dublin.
