= George Stokes (rugby union) =

- Born: George Stokes; 13 July 1995 (age 31)

Rugby union career
- Position: Flanker
Amateur team(s)
| Years | Team | Apps | (Points) |
- Trocadero Marbella
| 2013-14 | Bury St. Edmunds | | |
| 2017-18 | Ayr | | |
| 2018- | Darlington Mowden Park | | |
Senior career
| Years | Team | Apps | (Points) |
| 2013-14 | Northampton Saints | | |
| 2014-17 | Toulon | | |
| 2017-18 | Glasgow Warriors | | |
International career
| Years | Team | Apps | (Points) |
- Spain U17
| – | Spain U18 | | |

George Stokes (born 13 July 1995) is a rugby union player who plays for Darlington Mowden Park. His usual position is at the flanker position. He was previously with Glasgow Warriors, Ayr, Toulon and Northampton Saints,

== Rugby Union career ==
=== Amateur career ===
Stokes began his amateur career with Trocadero Marbella in Spain.

In England he played for Bury St. Edmunds.

Stokes played for Ayr when not on duty for Glasgow Warriors.

For the 2018–19 season, Stokes signed for Darlington Mowden Park in England.

=== Professional career ===
Stokes moved to Northampton Saints in 2013 He was loaned out to Bury St. Edmunds for game time.

After being declined by Wasps, Stokes moved to Toulon for the 2014 season.

He made one first team appearance for Toulon; in a November 2016 friendly against the Super Rugby side Sharks.

In April 2017 Stokes had a trial with Glasgow Warriors. He played for the Warriors against the Scotland U20s in a closed door training match and impressed.

On 23 May 2017 Stokes was announced as part of the 2017-18 season's intake to the Scottish Rugby Academy. Stokes will be placed in the Glasgow and West regional academy as a Stage 3 player. Stage 3 players are assigned to a professional side - with the Glasgow academy players being assigned to Glasgow Warriors.

Stokes said of the move to Glasgow: "I needed a new challenge and my agent got me a trial up in Scotland. I ended up playing in a trial match for Glasgow against the Scotland U20s just before the Six Nations. Gregor Townsend was keen to sign me after that and I signed my contract. Gregor is not the coach anymore but I’ll do my best to impress Dave Rennie and the new coaching staff and hopefully I can play many games for the Warriors this season."

He made his debut for Glasgow Warriors in their opening match of the 2017-18 season - against Northampton Saints at Bridgehaugh Park, Stirling on 19 August 2017.

=== International career ===
Stokes was capped for the Spain U17 and U18 side.

Stokes is Scottish qualified through his grandfather.
