= Paddy Kelly (rugby union) =

Scottish rugby union player

- Born: Patrick Kelly; 18 October 1995 (age 31) Inverness, Scotland
- Height: 1.86 m (6 ft 1 in)
- Weight: 96 kg (15 st 2 lb)
- School: Millburn Academy, Merchiston Castle School
- University: Glasgow University

Rugby union career
- Position: Centre
Amateur team(s)
Years	Team	Apps	(Points)
- Highland RFC
2014-15	Provence Rugby		
2015-18	Glasgow Hawks		
2018-	Ayr		
Senior career
Years	Team	Apps	(Points)
2015–	Glasgow Warriors	1	(0)
2016-17	→ London Scottish	10	(12)
International career
Years	Team	Apps	(Points)
2015	Scotland U20	9	(5)
National sevens team
Years	Team		Comps
2020	Scotland 7s		

Patrick Kelly (born 18 October 1995) is a Scotland 7s professional rugby union player who plays for Glasgow Warriors. He previously played for London Scottish. Kelly plays at centre.

== Rugby Union career ==
=== Amateur career ===
Kelly was at Millburn Academy in Inverness before winning a scholarship to Merchiston Castle School in Edinburgh at the age of 15. He captained Merchiston to the Brewin Dolphin Scottish Schools Cup final in 2012.

He played amateur rugby with Highland RFC. When starting studying with Glasgow University he moved on to play with French club Pays d'Aix Rugby Club, now Provence Rugby, in a gap year.

Kelly moved to play for Glasgow Hawks and played for them at the start of 2016. He later won a place to be coached in New Zealand in the summer of 2016 winning the John Macphail Scholarship.

He also started with the Hawks in the Scottish Premiership for season 2016-17, and again for the 2017-18 season. Kelly was drafted to Ayr for the 2018-19 season.

=== Professional career ===
In 2015-16 he won a place in the Glasgow and West of Scotland branch of the Scottish Rugby Academy as a Stage 3 (assigned to a professional club) player – Kelly was assigned to Glasgow Warriors.

He made his debut for Warriors against Canada A on 30 August 2016, scoring a try in a 63 – 0 win.

He was then loaned to London Scottish. He made his debut for the Exiles on 17 September 2016 against Rotherham Titans, scoring a try in the 31-30 win for Scottish in the 2016–17 RFU Championship.

He made his competitive debut for Glasgow Warriors in the Pro12 against the Ospreys on 25 November 2016. Kelly graduated from the Scottish Rugby Academy by signing a professional contract with the Warriors for the 2017-18 season.

Kelly was paired with Sam Johnson in the centre for the Warriors in their opening match of the 2017-18 season - against Northampton Saints at Bridgehaugh Park, Stirling on 19 August 2017.

He made his first appearance of the 2018-19 season for the Warriors in their 50 -17 defeat of Harlequins at North Inch, Perth in a preseason friendly on 18 August 2018.

=== International career ===
He was capped internationally by Scotland U20. Capped for Scotland 7s, he scored his first try in the World Sevens Series on 25 January 2020. He competed at the 2022 Rugby World Cup Sevens in Cape Town.

Sporting positions
Preceded by Ben Robbins, Callum Hunter-Hill	John Macphail Scholarship; Patrick Kelly, Ross McCann; 2016	Succeeded by Angus Fraser, Andrew Jardine, Guy Kelly
