= Andrew Davidson (rugby union) =

Scottish rugby union player (born 1996)

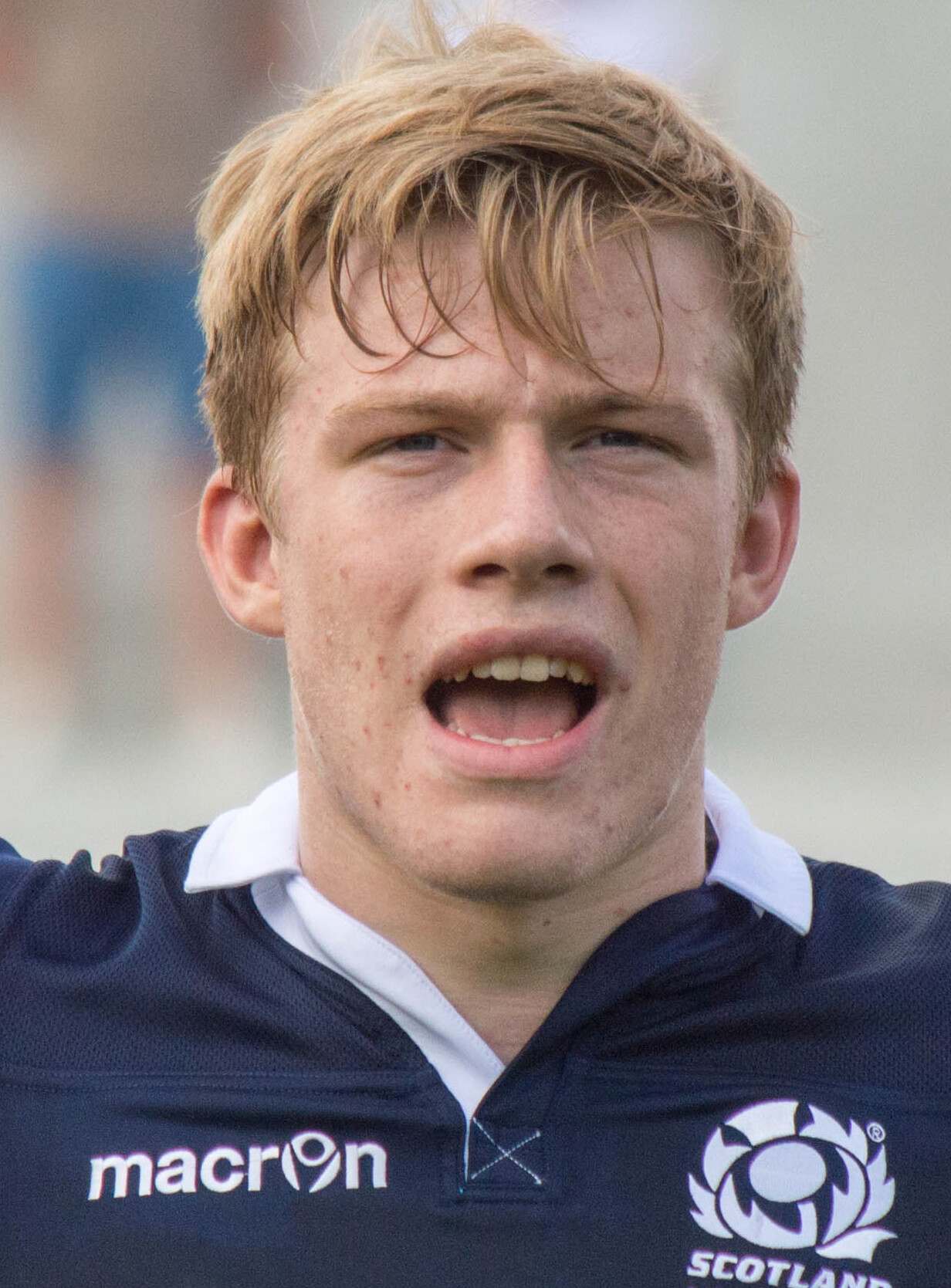
- Born: Andrew Davidson; 7 November 1996 (age 30) Glasgow, Scotland
- Height: 6 ft 7 in (2.01 m)
- Weight: 115 kg (18 st 2 lb)
- School: Kelvinside Academy

Rugby union career
- Position: Lock
Senior career
Years	Team	Apps	(Points)
2014–2016 2019–2020	Glasgow Warriors	5	(5)
2015	→London Scottish	1	(0)
2016–2019	Newcastle Falcons	23	(10)
2018	→ Glasgow Warriors	2	(0)
2020–2021	Edinburgh Rugby	13	(5)
2021–2023	Gloucester Rugby	30	(35)
2023–2024	Ealing Trailfinders	25	(35)
2024–	Skyactivs Hiroshima	29	(125)
- Correct as of 23 October 2022
International career
Years	Team	Apps	(Points)
2015–2016	Scotland U20	13	(0)

Andrew Davidson (born 7 November 1996) is a Scottish rugby union player at the Lock position. He currently plays for Skyactivs Hiroshima having previously played for Gloucester, Glasgow Warriors, London Scottish, Newcastle Falcons and Edinburgh Rugby.

Davidson was a product of the Scottish Rugby Academy.

== Rugby Union career ==
=== Amateur career ===
Davidson played for Glasgow Hawks when not in use by Glasgow Warriors.

=== Professional career ===
Davidson secured an Elite Development Programme place and was aligned to Glasgow Warriors for the 2014–15 season. This meant he could continue playing for Glasgow Hawks whilst training and challenging for a place at the Warriors.

He was named in 2015 as part of the Scottish Rugby Academy structure again aligned to the Glasgow Warriors. He played for Glasgow Hawks.

The lock made his debut for Glasgow Warriors in a pre-season friendly against ASM Clermont Auvergne.

In November 2015 he was loaned to London Scottish by Scottish Rugby Academy, to gain more experience of playing professional rugby.

On 11 May 2016 it was announced that he would be leaving Scottish Rugby Academy to join Newcastle Falcons.

He joined Glasgow Warriors again on 23 August 2018; this time on loan. The loan deal was made permanent for season 2019–20.

He played for Stirling Wolves in the Super 6 on 16 November 2019. He scored a try.

On 8 June 2020, Davidson signs for local rivals Edinburgh ahead of the 2020–21 season.

He joined Gloucester for the 2021–22 season.

On the 10th of February 2023, Gloucester announced Davidson had left the club and joined Ealing Trailfinders in the RFU Championship with immediate effect.

=== International career ===
He was to be capped by Scotland for the under-16s and under-18s; named in under-19s squad that travelled to Romania and capped by the under-20s.
