= Lelia Masaga =

- Full name: Lelia Tony Corona Masaga
- Born: 30 August 1986 (age 40) Wellington, New Zealand
- Height: 183 cm (6 ft 0 in)
- Weight: 95 kg (209 lb; 14 st 13 lb)
- School: James Cook High School

Rugby union career
- Position: Wing
- Current team: Glasgow Warriors
Senior career
Years	Team	Apps	(Points)
2005–2009	Counties Manukau	50	(130)
2006–2013	Chiefs	91	(190)
2010–2012	Bay of Plenty	30	(90)
2016–2017	Honda Heat	11	(10)
2017–	Glasgow Warriors	8	(5)
2018–2019	Glasgow Hawks	7	(20)
- Correct as of 19 January 2019
International career
Years	Team	Apps	(Points)
2006–2007	New Zealand U21	6	(35)
2009	New Zealand	1	(0)
- Correct as of 19 January 2019

Lelia Tony Corona Masaga (born 30 August 1986) is a New Zealand international retired rugby union player. He last played professionally for Glasgow Warriors. Masaga played on Wing.

== Rugby Union career ==
=== Amateur career ===
Masaga was drafted to Marr in the Scottish Premiership for the 2017–18 season.

Masaga has been drafted to Glasgow Hawks in the Scottish Premiership for the 2018–19 season.

=== Professional career ===
Masaga played for the Chiefs in New Zealand.

After the 2013 Super Rugby season, he moved to play rugby in Japan.

On 12 May 2017 Glasgow Warriors confirmed a 2-year signing of Masaga beginning for the 2017-18 season.

Masaga played his first match for the Warriors on 25 August 2017 coming on as a substitute against Dragons in a 40–23 away win.

=== International career ===
Masaga was selected for the New Zealand U21 side for the 2006 Under 21 Rugby World Cup in France. Masaga was the top try scorer in the tournament with 7 tries.

The NZRU's controversial decision to 'recondition' established All Black test players including Chiefs anchors Sitiveni Sivivatu and Mils Muliaina allowed Masaga to cement his position in the side. Despite early losses in the 2007 season, coaches Ian Foster and Warren Gatland showed patience and trust in the young winger who has performed remarkably well, co-leading the tournament as top try scorer with 8 tries going into the last round. He was included in the All Blacks squad for the 2009 Iveco Series to cover for injuries when he earned his first test cap against Italy on 27 June 2009.
