= Phil Healey =

NZ rugby union strength & conditioning coach

- Born: Phil Healey Hamilton, New Zealand
- School: Pukekohe High School

Rugby union career
Coaching career
- Years: Team
- 2003–08: Counties Manukau (Head Strength & Conditioning)
- 2008–17: Chiefs (Head Strength & Conditioning)
- 2017–18: Glasgow Warriors (Head Strength & Conditioning)
- 2018-: Blues

Phil Healey is a rugby union strength and conditioning coach with the Blues in Auckland, having previously been with Glasgow Warriors. He joined the Glasgow side for the 2017–18 season. Before he was with Glasgow he was previously a strength and conditioning coach for the Chiefs in New Zealand.

== Rugby union coaching career ==
Healey was the head strength and conditioning coach for Counties Manukau Rugby Football Union from 2003 until 2008.

He then joined the Chiefs in 2008 and stayed there until 2017. In 2016 the Chief's Head Coach, Dave Rennie, credited part of the team's success to the strength and conditioning work by Healey and his team. During Healey's time at the Chief's Waikato University's Sport and Leisure Studies students worked as interns with him.

He joined Glasgow Warriors for the 2017–18 season along with Dave Rennie.

On 23 October 2018 it was announced that Healey would leave Glasgow Warriors for personal reasons to return home to New Zealand. He will take up a position with the Blues in Auckland.
