= Fraser Brown (rugby union) =

Scotland international rugby union player (born 1989)

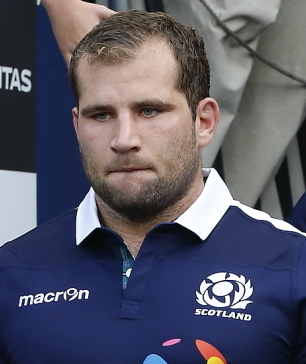
- Brown in 2017
- Born: Fraser James Macgregor Brown; 20 June 1989 (age 37) Lanark, Scotland
- Height: 1.82 m (6 ft 0 in)
- Weight: 113 kg (17 st 11 lb; 249 lb)
- School: Merchiston Castle School

Rugby union career
- Position(s): Hooker, flanker
Amateur team(s)
Years	Team	Apps	(Points)
- Heriots
2017-	Glasgow Hawks		
Senior career
Years	Team	Apps	(Points)
2010–2011	Edinburgh	40	(10)
2013–24	Glasgow Warriors	141	(125)
International career
Years	Team	Apps	(Points)
2007	Scotland U18		
2008–2009	Scotland U20	3	
2012-13	Scotland Club XV		
2013	Scotland A	1	
2013–	Scotland	61	(25)
- Correct as of 12 March 2023
Coaching career
- Years: Team
- 2023-: Watsonians (Forwards coach)

Fraser James Macgregor Brown (born 20 June 1989) is a Scotland international rugby union player. He currently plays for Glasgow Warriors in the United Rugby Championship. He plays as a hooker or in the back row.

== Rugby union career ==
=== Amateur career ===
Dropped by Edinburgh in 2011, Brown worked on the family farm in Carstairs and played for Heriot's Rugby Club.

Brown has been drafted to Glasgow Hawks in the Scottish Premiership for the 2017-18 season.

=== Professional career ===
In 2010, Brown was selected to play for Edinburgh in the 2010–11 Celtic League, but did not earn a cap.

Glasgow Warriors head coach Gregor Townsend recruited Brown in 2013 following injuries in the squad. He made his debut against Italian side Zebre.

=== International career ===
Fraser Brown has represented Scotland at many levels. He debuted for the Scotland Under 18s in 2007. In 2008, he was selected for the Scotland under-20s squad for the 2008 under-20s Six Nations, playing all five rounds. He was announced as captain for the 2009 season, and led the Scots to an 18–17 victory over Wales in the opening round of the 2009 under-20s Six Nations. He continued as captain going into the 2009 IRB Junior World Championship, the side eventually finishing ninth.

During Scotland's participation in the South African Quadrangular Series in 2013, Brown earned a late call up to the senior squad following an injury to fellow club player Pat MacArthur. He was a replacement for the test against South Africa, but failed to come off the bench during the match. However, Brown came off the bench the week after to earn his first cap against Italy.

=== Coaching career ===
Brown became an assistant coach at Super Series side Watsonians. He will concentrate on the Forwards and breakdown work. This will be in conjunction with his playing career at Glasgow Warriors.
