= Rory Hughes =

Scotland international rugby union player

Rory William Hughes
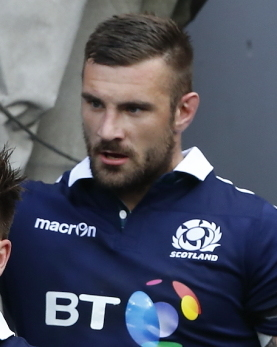
- Hughes in 2017
- Born: 4 March 1993 (age 33) Glasgow, Scotland
- Height: 6 ft 1 in (1.85 m)
- Weight: 102 kg (16 st 1 lb; 225 lb)
- School: Kings Park Secondary School

Rugby union career
- Position: Wing / Full-back
Amateur team(s)
| Years | Team | Apps | (Points) |
- GHA
- Stirling County
| 2017-19 | Ayr | | |
Senior career
| Years | Team | Apps | (Points) |
| 2013–2020 | Glasgow Warriors | 74 | (105) |
| 2015–2016 | → London Scottish (Loan) | 6 | (20) |
| 2019 | Ayrshire Bulls | 1 | (10) |
| 2020 | → Leicester Tigers (Loan) | 4 | (0) |
- Correct as of 29 April 2020
International career
| Years | Team | Apps | (Points) |
- Scotland U17
- Scotland U18
| 2012–2013 | Scotland U20 | 10 | (0) |
| 2015-2017 | Scotland | 4 | (0) |
- Correct as of 19 June 2017
National sevens team
| Years | Team | | Comps |
| 2011–2015 | Scotland 7s | | 3 |

Rory Hughes (born 4 March 1993) is a former Scottish rugby union player who recently played for Glasgow Warriors at the Wing or Full-back positions.

== Rugby union career ==
=== Amateur career ===
Hughes was born in Glasgow and was raised in the Castlemilk district; he attended a school with no rugby programme. From the age of 6 he played for GHA, before joining Stirling County and the Scottish Rugby Elite Development system in 2011, aged 18. He was assigned to Glasgow Warriors, joining the professional squad in 2013. He has since spent time back with Stirling County when released to play for them by the Warriors.

Hughes was assigned to Ayr in the Pro draft for the Scottish Premiership sides from Glasgow Warriors for the 2017-18 season.

=== Professional career ===
On 11 December 2015, Hughes was loaned out to London Scottish to get game time before the Six Nations tournament. Hughes scored five tries in four appearances for Scottish before returning to Glasgow Warriors in time for the Ospreys game on 31 January 2016.

Hughes scored his first competitive try for Glasgow Warriors in the match against the Ospreys.

He made his debut for the Ayrshire Bulls in the Super 6 on 16 November 2019. He scored 2 tries.

On 2 January 2020, Hughes went on loan to Leicester Tigers.

=== International career ===
Hughes was selected as part of Scotland head coach Vern Cotter's 2015 Rugby Union World Cup training squad of 46 players.

He made his international début for Scotland against Italy in Turin, Italy on 22 August 2015.
