= Kiran McDonald =

Scottish rugby union player

- Born: 1 November 1994 (age 32) Glasgow, Scotland
- Height: 2.03 m (6 ft 8 in)
- Weight: 116 kg (18.3 st; 256 lb)
- School: Boclair Academy
- University: City of Glasgow College

Rugby union career
- Position: Lock
Amateur team(s)
Years	Team	Apps	(Points)
2013–2014	Glasgow Academicals		
2014–2016	Glasgow Hawks		
2016–2017	Hull		
2017–2018	Glasgow Hawks		
2018–2022	Currie		
Senior career
Years	Team	Apps	(Points)
2015–2016 2017–2022	Glasgow Warriors	55	(10)
2022	Wasps	4	(0)
2022–2023	Munster	3	(0)
2023–2025	Newcastle Falcons	31	(10)
2025–	Kintetsu Liners		
- Correct as of 1 January 2023
International career
Years	Team	Apps	(Points)
2022	Barbarians	1	(0)
- Correct as of 20 November 2022

Kiran McDonald Seran (born 11 January 1994) is a Scottish rugby union player. He plays as a lock.

== Rugby union career ==
=== Amateur career ===
McDonald has played for Glasgow Academicals, Glasgow Hawks, Hull and Currie at an amateur level.

=== Professional career ===
McDonald played for Glasgow Warriors against Canada 'A' on 30 August 2016 in a 63–0 win for the Warriors at Bridgehaugh Park, Stirling. He re-joined with the Warriors on 5 May 2017 for the 2017–18 season. He made his competitive debut for the Warriors away against the Ospreys in the Pro14 on 26 November 2017. He started the match which ended in a 7-try demolition of the Welsh side.

McDonald moved to Wasps ahead of the 2022–23 season but was made redundant on 17 October 2022 along with all other players and coaching staff when Wasps entered administration. He subsequently joined Irish United Rugby Championship club Munster on a three-month contract as injury cover in late October 2022, and made his senior competitive debut for the province when he started in their historic 28–14 win against a South Africa XV in Páirc Uí Chaoimh on 10 November 2022. McDonald departed the province upon the completion of his three-month contract at the end of January 2023. He will join English club Newcastle Falcons on a two-year contract from the 2023–24 season.

He joined Kintetsu Liners in Japan on 22 July 2025.

=== International career ===
McDonald was called up to the Scotland squad for the 2021 summer internationals. He played for the Barbarians in their 31–30 win against Bath on 20 November 2022.

== Outside of rugby ==
In 2012, as an RAF cadet, McDonald Seran won the Kriegie Trophy. The trophy is awarded to the cadet who, in the opinion of the officers, is the best of the air cadets to attend the course in that particular year. A motion was lodged in the Scottish Parliament by his local SNP MSP, Fiona McLeod, to congratulate McDonald's achievement.

== Honours ==
=== Munster ===
- United Rugby Championship
  - Winner (1): 2022–23
