= Siua Halanukonuka =

Tonga international rugby union player

- Full name: Siosiua Halanukonuka
- Born: 9 August 1986 (age 40) Tongatapu, Tonga
- Height: 1.86 m (6 ft 1 in)
- Weight: 122 kg (19 st 3 lb; 269 lb)
- School: Tamaki College

Rugby union career
- Position: Prop
- Current team: Glasgow Warriors
Amateur team(s)
Years	Team	Apps	(Points)
2017-2018	Marr		
2018-2020	Ayr		
Senior career
Years	Team	Apps	(Points)
2009	Counties Manukau	3	(0)
2012	Auckland	1	(0)
2013−2017	Tasman	46	(5)
2014−2015	Narbonne	10	(0)
2016−2017	Highlanders	28	(0)
2017−2020	Glasgow Warriors	17	(5)
2020–	Perpignan	27	(0)
- Correct as of 12 June 2022
International career
Years	Team	Apps	(Points)
2014−	Tonga	11	(0)
- Correct as of 11 September 2019

Siosiua Halanukonuka (born 9 August 1986) is a Tongan rugby union player. He plays in the prop position for the France side Perpignan. Halanukonuka also represents Tonga at international level.

== Club career ==
After appearing three times for Counties Manukau in 2009 and once for Auckland in 2012, Halanukonuka made the move south to join the Tasman Makos for the 2013 ITM Cup and turned out 11 times to help them gain promotion from the Championship division. 2014 was another successful year as he played 10 times in a campaign that saw the Makos reach the final of the Premiership, ultimately going down 36–32 to Taranaki.

The Makos were again Premiership semi-finalists in 2015 and made the final of the 2016 Mitre 10 Cup before losing out 43–27 to local rivals, Canterbury. Halanukonuka played 17 times across the 2 seasons, largely appearing as a second-half replacement.

As well as spending several seasons playing in New Zealand's domestic rugby competitions, Halanukonuka spent part of the 2014–15 Rugby Pro D2 season playing as an injury joker for Narbonne. In total he played 10 times for the French outfit and picked up 2 yellow cards during his time in Occitanie as they finished a disappointing 14th out of 16 teams in the competition.

Several seasons of strong performances for Tasman in the National Provincial Championship brought him to the attention of Dunedin-based Super Rugby franchise, the Highlanders and the then defending champions named him in their squad for the 2016 Super Rugby season. Faced with stiff competition for places in the Highlanders front row, Halanukonuka acquitted himself well, playing 14 times in his debut season including 8 starts. Unfortunately, his efforts weren't enough to help his franchise retain their Super Rugby crown and they were eliminated at the semi-final stage by the Lions.

Tony Brown replaced the Japan-bound Jamie Joseph as Highlanders head coach ahead of the 2017 season and he opted to retain Halanukonuka in the squad for his first campaign in charge.

On 28 July 2017, Siua travels to Scotland to sign for Glasgow Warriors in the Pro14 on a two-year deal from the 2017–18 season. Halanukonuka was drafted to Marr in the Scottish Premiership for the 2017–18 season. Halanukonuka has been drafted to Ayr in the Scottish Premiership for the 2018–19 season.

On 18 June 2020, Siua returns to France to join Pro D2 outfit Perpignan from the 2020–21 season.

== International career ==
Halanukonuka made his test debut for Tonga on 8 November 2014 in a match against Georgia in Tbilisi, coming on as a second-half replacement in a 23–9 victory for his side. That was to be his only test appearance for over 2 years before he was recalled ahead of the 2016 end-of-year rugby union internationals where he played all 3 of Tonga's tests against; Spain, the United States and Italy. He started in the number 3 jersey in all 3 games which all resulted in victories, including a famous 19–17 win over Italy in Padua on 26 November 2016.

== Career Honours ==
Tasman

- ITM Cup Championship - 2013

=== Super Rugby statistics ===
As of 11 January 2017

Season	Team	Games	Starts	Sub	Mins	Tries	Cons	Pens	Drops	Points	Yel	Red
2016	Highlanders	14	8	6	546	0	0	0	0	0	0	0
Total		14	8	6	546	0	0	0	0	0	0	0
