= Pat MacArthur =

Scotland international rugby union player

- Born: Patrick Calum MacArthur; 27 April 1987 (age 39) Irvine, North Ayrshire, Scotland
- Height: 1.83 m (6 ft 0 in)
- Weight: 100 kg (15 st 10 lb; 220 lb)
- School: Prestwick Academy

Rugby union career
- Position: Hooker
Amateur team(s)
Years	Team	Apps	(Points)
- Ayr
–	West of Scotland		
–	Ayr		
Senior career
Years	Team	Apps	(Points)
2007–18	Glasgow Warriors	165	(20)
International career
Years	Team	Apps	(Points)
- Scotland U18
2005-06	Scotland U19		
2007	Scotland U20	5	(0)
- Scotland Club XV
2012	Scotland A		
2013–2014	Scotland	6	(0)
Coaching career
- Years: Team
- Ayr (Asst. Coach)

Patrick Calum MacArthur (born 27 April 1987) is a former Scotland international rugby union player. He formerly played as a hooker for Glasgow Warriors in the Pro14. He is now a player-coach at Ayr.

== Rugby Union career ==
=== Amateur career ===
He has played for West of Scotland

MacArthur has turned out for Ayr. He was assigned Ayr in the Pro draft for the Scottish Premiership sides from Glasgow Warriors for the season 2017-18.

=== Professional career ===
MacArthur has made more than 100 appearances for Glasgow Warriors.

=== International career ===
MacArthur represented his country at under-18, 19 and 20 level. He played for Scotland A in 2012, before making his full international debut with Scotland in 2013.

=== Coaching career ===
MacArthur is the Assistant Coach at Ayr. It was announced that he would keep playing for one more year in a player-coach capacity at the club.
