= Village Hotel Club =

Hotel business

- Trade name: Village Hotels
- Company type: Private
- Traded as: Village Urban Resorts; De Vere Village Hotels; Village Hotel Club
- Industry: Hospitality
- Founded: 1976
- Headquarters: Warrington, United Kingdom
- Number of locations: 34 (December 2025)
- Area served: United Kingdom
- Key people: Gary Davis; (Executive Chairman); Paul Roberts; (CEO)
- Brands: Pub &Grill; Starbucks; Village Gym; VWorks; MeetMe Business Hub.
- Number of employees: 4300 (2025)
- Parent: KSL Capital Partners; (2014-24); The Blackstone Group; (2024–present)
- Website: village-hotels.co.uk

Village Hotels is a hotel business founded in 1995 that operates 34 hotels in the United Kingdom. After being controlled by Denver-based private equity firm KSL Capital Partners, the company was purchased in June 2024 by The Blackstone Group.

== History ==
The company dates back to 1976 when bedrooms were added to Hyde Squash Club, near Manchester, by John Burrows to create Village Hotel and Leisure Club. Other hotels were added in Bury and Cheadle before the business was sold to Boddingtons brewery, which was bought in 1996 by its rival Greenall's.

In March 2014, Village Urban Resorts was acquired from De Vere Group by KSL Capital Partners for £435 million as part of the group disposal with sale proceedings being used to payback debts of over £1.75 billion.

Following the reopening of all Hotels after the Coronavirus Pandemic in May 2021, the decision was made that all Village Spas would remain permanently closed. Most Spas have been removed and the space now being accommodated by additions to the Leisure Club.

In Late 2021 the final stages were completed for the removal of the American themed Italian Restaurant - Buca Di Beppo

It was announced on 26 June, 2024 that Village Hotels had been bought by private equity giant The Blackstone Group. It's the groups second foray into the UK hotel market after it purchased Bourne Leisure which owns Warner Leisure Hotels in 2021.

== Hotels ==
Village hotels are mainly located on the outskirts of large towns and cities within England, Wales and Scotland. Hotels are mid-sized and operate as lifestyle mid market to upscale properties. Each hotel typically has between 110 and 160 rooms, a Pub & Grill, a Starbucks, meeting & conference rooms (branded as MeetMe Business Hub) and VWorks (new addition to hire smaller meeting rooms by the hour or a monthly membership to use facilities within VWorks). The Village Hotel Blackpool has an 18-hole golf course and an outdoor heated swimming pool.

The chain has 34 hotels which they split into two categories based on the hotel style; Legacy and Black Box hotels. Village currently operates 21 "legacy" hotels and 12 "black box style" hotels.

The Blackstone Group have heavily invested in their first year of ownership. They have acquired two hotels which are currently under refurbishment, namely in Reading (Opening December 2025) and most recently Sheffield (Opening Autumn 2026)

Several hotels have had major refurbishment works completed to the Leisure clubs which has involved additional facilities added - Reformer Pilates, Outdoor Gyms, Padel, Refurbished Studios, Additional Studios added and Changing Rooms refurbishments.

Some hotels have had VWorks removed to accommodate space for the addition’s & refurbishment to the Leisure Clubs.

Five existing hotels have extensions planned - Manchester Ashton, Dudley, Farnborough Leeds South & Solihull which will see a further 48 bedrooms added to each property as well as additional full refurbishments of the existing Leisure Clubs & Starbucks at these sites. Works have already begun at Manchester Ashton and Leeds South, with works scheduled to completed at all sites by 2026.

=== Locations ===
Scotland

- Aberdeen
- Edinburgh
- Glasgow

North East & Yorkshire

- Hull
- Leeds North
- Leeds South (Capitol Park)
- Newcastle (Cobalt Park)
- Sheffield (Opening August 2026)

North West

- Blackpool
- Liverpool
- Manchester Ashton
- Manchester Bury
- Manchester Cheadle
- Manchester Hyde
- Warrington
- Wirral

Midlands

- Dudley
- Walsall
- Coventry
- Nottingham
- Solihull

Wales

- Cardiff
- Chester St David’s
- Swansea

South

- Basingstoke
- Bournemouth
- Bracknell
- Bristol
- Farnborough
- London Watford
- Maidstone
- Portsmouth
- Reading
- Southampton Eastleigh
- Swindon
