= D'Arcy Rae =

Scotland international rugby union player

- Born: D'Arcy Rae; 21 December 1994 (age 31) Irvine, North Ayrshire, Scotland
- Height: 6 ft 1 in (1.85 m)
- Weight: 128 kg (282 lb; 20 st 2 lb)

Rugby union career
- Position: Tighthead Prop
Senior career
| Years | Team | Apps | (Points) |
| 2013–2021 | Glasgow Warriors | 85 | (5) |
| 2014–2015 | → Benetton Rugby | 3 | (0) |
| 2015 | → London Scottish | 5 | (0) |
| 2021–2023 | Bath Rugby | 46 | (0) |
| 2023 | Montpellier | 2 | (0) |
| 2023– | Edinburgh Rugby | 31 | (0) |
- Correct as of 29 May 2024
International career
| Years | Team | Apps | (Points) |
| 2013–2014 | Scotland U20 | 18 | (5) |
| 2019– | Scotland | 8 | (0) |
| 2024– | Scotland A | 2 | (0) |

D'Arcy Rae (born 21 December 1994) is a Scotland international rugby union player who plays for Edinburgh at the Tighthead Prop position.

== Rugby Union career ==
=== Amateur career ===
Aged 17, Rae was part of the all conquering Ayr team of 2012–13 that won the Premier League, Scottish Cup and the Bill McLaren Shield, a unique treble that had only been achieved previously by Heriot's RFC. He was drafted to Marr in the Scottish Premiership for the 2017-18 season.

Rae has been drafted to Ayr in the Scottish Premiership for the 2018-19 season.

=== Professional career ===
Rae signed for the Glasgow Warriors in 2013–14. He is also a qualified community rugby coach. On 23 December 2014 he joined Treviso until the end of January 2015 and experienced playing in and winning the two Italian derbies against Zebre and also played against Ulster and Edinburgh.

He made his competitive debut for Glasgow Warriors on 6 February 2015 against Munster at Thormond Park. He became Glasgow Warrior No. 241. On 9 April 2015 he joined London Scottish on loan till the end of the 2014–15 season and played against Nottingham, Rotherham Titans, Leeds Carnegie and then experienced playing in the Championship playoff semi finals home and away against the eventual winners Worcester Warriors. He was contracted to Glasgow Warriors until 2017.

On 28 May 2021 it was announced that he would sign for Bath for the 2021-22 season. Rae stated:

I’ve loved my time here at Glasgow Warriors. Playing for my boyhood club has been a dream come true but it's time for a new challenge. I'm really excited for what's in front of me and looking forward to getting started at Bath.

In his first season prior to injury he played in 23 games for Bath in season 2021/22.

=== International career ===
Rae has represented Scotland at under-17, under-18 and has been capped 18 times at under-20 having played in two Junior World and two Six Nations Under-20 Championships. During the 2014 Junior World Championship held in New Zealand Scotland had to make a powerful second-half comeback to beat their Italian counterparts during which D'arcy Rae made a magnificent break, charging a good 30-meter, to cross for the third score that sealed the victory that ensured Scotlands participation at the elite level in 2015.

He was one of three uncapped players selected by Gregor Townsend for the 2017 Scotland Summer tour of Singapore, Australia and Fiji and in January 2018 he was called up to the senior Scotland squad for the 2018 Six Nations Championship.

Rae received his first senior cap for Scotland against Ireland in the 2019 Six Nations Championship.

He played for Scotland 'A' on 6 February 2026 in their match against Italy XV.

=== Coaching career ===
Rae has agreed to be Marr's forward coach for season 2019 - 20.
