= George Petrakos =

- Born: George Petrakos c.1 January 1988 (age 38) England

Rugby union career
Coaching career
- Years: Team
- 2009-10: Leicester Tigers (Conditioning Coach)
- 2010-11: Edinburgh Rugby (Strength & Conditioning Coach)
- 2010-11: Scotland (Asst. Strength & Conditioning Coach)
- 2016-18: Glasgow Warriors (Strength & Conditioning Coach)
- 2019: Scotland (Strength & Conditioning Coach)
- 2020-22: Wasps (Strength & Conditioning Coach)
- 2023-: Italy (Strength & Conditioning Coach)

George Petrakos (born c. 1988 in Essex, England) is a rugby union strength and conditioning coach with Italy.

== Rugby Union ==
=== Coaching career ===
He started as a Strength and Conditioning Coach for Glasgow Warriors in 2016.

He previously worked with Leicester Tigers, Edinburgh rugby and Scotland.

== Football ==
He was a Sports Science intern with Chelsea FC. During a year at the football club he worked under Scolari, Hiddink and Ancelotti.

== Hockey ==
Petrakos was the Lead Strength and Conditioning Coach for the Ireland national women's hockey team.

== Academic career ==
Petrakos graduated from the University of Loughborough with a BSc in Sports Science.

He then studied at the University of Edinburgh and gained a Masters in Strength and Conditioning.

In Ireland he became the Lead Strength and Conditioning Coach for University College Dublin and lectured in the subject from 2012 - 16.

He became a researcher in force application at the Dublin University and used resisted sled sprint training to profile sprinting performance from 2015 - 16. He has published research on using very heavy sled training for improving horizontal force output.
