= Sam Yawayawa =

Fijian rugby union player

- Born: Sam Yawayawa; 2 July 1998 (age 28) Suva, Fiji
- Height: 1.70 m (5 ft 7 in)
- Weight: 96 kg (15 st 2 lb; 212 lb)
- School: Firrhill High School, Edinburgh

Rugby union career
- Position: Wing
Amateur team(s)
Years	Team	Apps	(Points)
- Boroughmuir
2017-2018	Glasgow Hawks	12	(10)
2018-2020	Cambridge		
Senior career
Years	Team	Apps	(Points)
2014-2017	Leicester Tigers	0	(0)
2016-2017	→ Nottingham	12	(0)
2017-2018	Glasgow Warriors	0	(0)
2020–	London Scottish		
Provincial / State sides
Years	Team	Apps	(Points)
- Edinburgh U16
International career
Years	Team	Apps	(Points)
- Scotland U16
- England U18
2018	Scotland U20	1	(0)

Sam Yawayawa (born 2 July 1998 in Suva, Fiji) is a Fijian born Scottish rugby union player who plays for London Scottish. He was previously at Glasgow Warriors, Leicester Tigers, Boroughmuir and Glasgow Hawks. His usual position is at the Wing position.

== Rugby Union career ==
=== Amateur career ===
Yawayawa was educated at first in Germany and then in Scotland. He played for Boroughmuir. He was part of the Boroughmuir U16 side that won the National Bowl final in 2014.

He entered the Scottish Rugby Academy at the Stage 3 professional phase of the academy in the 2017-18 season.

Yawayawa played for Glasgow Hawks when not in use by Glasgow Warriors.

He was signed by Cambridge at the start of season 2018-19.

=== Professional career ===
He played for Edinburgh at U16 grade.

Yawayawa joined Leicester Tigers. He was loaned out to Nottingham for game time.

Yawayawa was enrolled in the BT Sport Scottish Rugby Academy as a Stage 3 player. Stage 3 players are aligned to a professional club and given regional support. Yawayawa was assigned to the Glasgow Warriors for the season 2017-18.

On 6 August 2020, Yawayawa returns to the RFU Championship to sign for London Scottish ahead of the 2020-21 season.

=== International career ===
Yawayawa first played for Scotland U16.

Although Yawayawa was selected for the Scotland U18 side, after he was signed for Leicester Tigers in England, Yawayawa then played for England U18.

Yawayawa made his Scotland U20 debut against Wales U20 in 2018.
