= Bruce Flockhart =

Scottish rugby union player (born 1997)

- Born: Bruce Flockhart; 23 August 1997 (age 29) Inverness, Scotland
- Height: 6 ft 6 in (1.98 m)
- Weight: 108 kg (17 st 0 lb)
- School: Strathallan School

Rugby union career
- Position: Number Eight
Amateur team(s)
| Years | Team | Apps | (Points) |
| 2015- | Glasgow Hawks | 4 | (0) |
| 2017-18 | →Stade Niçois | | |
Senior career
| Years | Team | Apps | (Points) |
| 2015-21 | Glasgow Warriors | 7 | (0) |
International career
| Years | Team | Apps | (Points) |
| | Scotland Under 18 | 0 | |
| 2016-17 | Scotland Under 20 | 8 | |

Bruce Flockhart (born 23 August 1997) is a Scottish former professional rugby union player who played for Glasgow Warriors. His usual position is at the Number Eight position. He has previously been loaned out from Glasgow Warriors and the Scottish Rugby Academy to the French side Stade Niçois for the 2017-18 season.

== Rugby Union career ==
=== Amateur career ===
His father, Donald, played rugby union for Scotland Under 21s.

From Culloden Academy, Flockhart then moved to Strathallan School.

When not in Warriors duty, Flockhart played for Glasgow Hawks.

On 25 July 2017 it was announced that Flockhart would be loaned out to Stade Niçois, a Federale 2 club in France, outwith the French professional leagues. On 7 June 2018 it was noted that Flockhart's loan spell was over and he had returned to earn a contract with Glasgow Warriors.

Gibbins has been drafted to Glasgow Hawks in the Scottish Premiership for the 2018-19 season.

=== Professional career ===
He played for a Glasgow Warriors select side against an Ulster select side at the start of the 2014-15 season.

He was invited to train with Glasgow Warriors and Edinburgh at the end of the 2014-15 season.

Flockhart is enrolled in the BT Sport Scottish Rugby Academy as a Stage 3 player. Stage 3 players are aligned to a professional club and given regional support.

Flockhart has been assigned from the Scottish Rugby Academy to Glasgow Warriors from the 2015-16 season onwards.

Flockhart started for Glasgow Warriors against Edinburgh in an 'A' match at Broadwood Stadium. He scored a try in the match and Warriors eventually won the derby match 26-5.

Flockhart graduated from the Scottish Rugby Academy to earn a professional contract with Glasgow Warriors on 7 June 2018. He has earned a one-year deal with the club.

He made his first appearance for the Warriors in their 50 -17 demolition of Harlequins at North Inch, Perth on 18 August 2018.

On 23 July 2021, he ended his professional rugby union career after he had a struggle with mental health, stating: "This decision is about taking care of my mind and my body and exploring my options beyond rugby. From the experience that I have gained through my struggles, I now realise how important it is to be mentally flexible and to not put such heavy pressure on myself again."

He thanked Glasgow Warriors and the Scottish Rugby Union for their support in helping him through, particularly former head coach Dave Rennie:

I’m very grateful to have spent four years with Glasgow. My journey has had ups and downs, but all in all I leave with great memories. Glasgow Warriors are a very special team to be a part of. Frustratingly for me, countless injuries that started with my back in 2015 – prior to joining Glasgow – mean that it hasn’t always been plain sailing. Naturally, something like this takes its toll on a person mentally, which it has with me. I owe a lot to Dave Rennie, who would pull me aside for chats checking that I was coping OK. In the beginning, I didn't want to admit that I was struggling because I viewed it as a sign of weakness and I didn't want it to count against me for selection. The day that I finally admitted that I wasn't coping, he told me something that helped me a lot. He said, 'Mental health problems are like injuries so treat them as such. You have a mental health issue, you see a psychologist and rehab it back to full strength.' The support that I have received from everyone within Scottish Rugby has far exceeded anything that I would have expected. I can't stress how grateful I am. The boys have been great too, with many of them sharing their own personal stories with me and what has helped them.

=== International career ===
He received his first Scotland Under 18 cap in March 2015, playing against England.
