= Callum Gibbins =

New Zealand rugby union player

- Born: 14 September 1988 (age 38) New Plymouth, New Zealand
- Height: 185 cm (6 ft 1 in)
- Weight: 101 kg (15 st 13 lb)
- School: Inglewood High School
- University: Massey University

Rugby union career
- Position: Flanker
Amateur team(s)
Years	Team	Apps	(Points)
2017–18	Stirling County		
2018–20	Glasgow Hawks		
Senior career
Years	Team	Apps	(Points)
2017–20	Glasgow Warriors	47	(65)
2020–21	Old Glory DC	13	(15)
Provincial / State sides
Years	Team	Apps	(Points)
2009–17	Manawatu	66	(95)
- Correct as of 16 October 2016
Super Rugby
Years	Team	Apps	(Points)
2015–17	Hurricanes	25	(15)
- Correct as of 6 August 2016

Callum Gibbins (born 14 September 1988) is a New Zealand rugby union player who plays as a flanker for Old Glory DC of Major League Rugby (MLR) in the United States.

He previously played flanker for the Glasgow Warriors in the Pro14.

== Rugby union career ==
=== Amateur career ===
Gibbins was drafted to Stirling County in the Scottish Premiership for the 2017–18 season.

Gibbins has been drafted to Glasgow Hawks in the Scottish Premiership for the 2018–19 season.

=== Professional career ===
Gibbins moved to Palmerston North in 2007 to study for a Bachelor of Sport and Exercise at Massey University. He made his Manawatu Turbos debut in 2009 against Wellington.

He was named in the Hurricanes Wider Training Group for the 2013 Super Rugby season. In 2015 Gibbins signed a full contract to be in the Hurricanes first team squad after two strong years in the Wider Training Group. He went on to play in all but one of the Hurricanes fixtures in 2015. He extended his Hurricanes contract to the end of the 2016 season.

Gibbins made his debut for Glasgow Warriors in September 2017 in their league match versus Ospreys.

He was made co-captain of the club for season 2018–19.

On 6 November 2020, it was confirmed that Gibbins travels to USA to join Old Glory DC in the Major League Rugby competition on a player-coach capacity.
