= Peter Horne =

Scotland international rugby union player

- Born: Peter Horne; 5 October 1989 (age 37) Aberdeen, Scotland
- Height: 1.83 m (6 ft 0 in)
- Weight: 93 kg (14 st 9 lb; 205 lb)
- School: Bell Baxter High School
- Notable relative(s): George Horne, brother
- Occupation: Rugby union coach

Rugby union career
- Position(s): Centre, Fly-Half
Amateur team(s)
Years	Team	Apps	(Points)
2007-09	Howe of Fife		
2008-09	West of Scotland		
2009-10	Melrose		
2010-11	Dundee HSFP		
2011-14	Stirling County		
2014–19	Glasgow Hawks		
Senior career
Years	Team	Apps	(Points)
2009–21	Glasgow Warriors	182	(446)
International career
Years	Team	Apps	(Points)
2007–09	Scotland U20		
2010	Scotland A	1	(0)
2013-21	Scotland	45	(53)
National sevens team
Years	Team		Comps
2011–12	Scotland 7s		3 (45)
Coaching career
- Years: Team
- 2017-18: Glasgow Hawks (Player-coach)
- 2018-19: Glasgow High Kelvinside (Asst. coach)
- 2019-21: Stirling County (Asst. coach)
- 2022: Ayrshire Bulls
- 2022-23: Glasgow Warriors (Skills coach)
- 2023-: Scotland (Asst. coach)

Peter Horne is a Scottish rugby union coach and the current assistant coach for Scotland. He previously was Head Coach of the Ayrshire Bulls and a Skills Coach for Glasgow Warriors. As a player he was a Scotland international rugby union player; and at club level he previously played for Glasgow Warriors for over a decade. At the time of his retirement he was the club's most capped back.

== Playing career ==
=== Amateur career ===
As a player he could play at centre or fly-half.

Horne was previously part of a group of Fife youngsters who achieved a rare double, playing in the Bell Baxter High School team who won the Bell Lawrie Scottish Schools Cup and then in the Howe of Fife squad who lifted the Scottish Youth League Cup. In season 2006–07, too, he was in the Bell Baxter team who won the Royal Navy schools sevens.

He played for West of Scotland in season 2008–09.

He was drafted to Melrose in season 2009–10. He was drafted to Dundee HSFP the following season. He was drafted to Stirling County for 2011-12 and 2013–14 season.

Drafted for the Hawks in 2014 and 2016, Horne was again drafted to Glasgow Hawks in the Scottish Premiership for the 2017–18 season.

=== Professional career ===
He made his debut for Glasgow Warriors as a replacement in the Celtic League match against Ulster in March 2009, his first start following the same month against Munster at Firhill, and he signed a full-time contract in the summer. He is Glasgow Warrior No. 172.

Horne was a near-permanent fixture in the Glasgow Warriors squad that won the 2014–15 Pro12 title. He was named in the Pro12 Dream Team at the end of the 2014/15 season. He signed a new 3-year contract in 2017, taking him to the end of the 2019/20 season.

=== International career ===
Later in 2007, he played for Scotland in the Home Unions' under-18 festival in Gloucestershire, and in 2008 he played international rugby at both under-19 and under-20 levels. He was in the Scotland team who beat Italy in the under-19 international in February at Parabagio, near Milan, and he then played for the national under-20 squad in all five matches in the IRB Junior World Championship in Wales in June, starting in three of the games. He moved from Howe of Fife to West of Scotland for season 2008–09 and signed up with Glasgow Warriors a year later.

He scored all of Scotland's points with six penalty goals in the 18–17 win against Wales in the 2009 Six Nations Under-20 Championship match at McDiarmid Park, Perth, in February. His tally was a Scottish record in the championship, and he added a penalty goal in each of the subsequent matches against France and Italy. However, that tally of 24 points was passed by Robbie McGowan later in the championship with 27.

Peter took his under-20-year's tally to 63 points when he scored 39 in starting in all five matches in the IRB Junior World Championship in Japan in June.

Horne made his full international debut for Scotland on the 2013 summer tour to South Africa, during which he picked up a serious knee injury which kept him sidelined for almost a year. His first full home international came against Italy during the 2015 6 Nations.

== Coaching career ==
Horne was a player-coach at Glasgow Hawks for 2017–18. He moved to an Assistant Coach role at Glasgow High Kelvinside for the 2018–19 season. On 21 June 2019 it was announced that he would be the Assistant Coach at Stirling County.

It was announced that he would take over as Head Coach for the Super 6 side Ayrshire Bulls in 2022.

On 15 June 2022 it was announced that Horne would be the Skills Coach for Glasgow Warriors.

On 27 November 2023 it was announced that he would be the Assistant Coach for the Scotland national rugby union team.
