= Nathan Bombrys =

Scottish rugby union footballer

Nathan Bombrys is the Chief Executive Officer of Rugby Canada. He was previously the Head of International Commercial Projects in the Scottish Rugby Union and the managing director of the Glasgow Warriors, a professional Scottish rugby union club playing in the Pro14.

== Career ==
Bombrys is from the state of Michigan in the United States and grew up in Mendon. He began playing rugby at Syracuse University, where he captained the team. Bombrys played rugby for 17 years, and also qualified as a referee.

Bombrys worked with the London Towers basketball program. After that, he spent seven years overseeing commercial operations at Sale Sharks in the English Premiership, and then worked as the head of the commercial department at the Scottish Rugby Union's headquarters.

=== Glasgow Warriors ===
Bombrys began working with Glasgow Warriors in 2011. One of his first projects was to oversee Glasgow's move from Firhill Stadium to Scotstoun Stadium in Glasgow's west end. Since making the move, the Warriors have gone from 700 season tickets to over 3,500 season tickets. The Warriors have also seen on-field success during Bombrys' tenure, finishing in the Pro 12 top four in 2012 and 2013, and reaching the final in 2014 and becoming Pro12 champions in 2015.

On 10 March 2021 it was announced that Bombrys would take over as Head of International Commercial Projects at Scottish Rugby in April 2021. Former Glasgow Warriors captain Alastair Kellock would replace him as managing director of the Glasgow club. Bombrys said of his time at the Warriors: "Glasgow Warriors is such a special club. I’ve been privileged to play my part over the past 10 years, working with so many talented staff, coaches and players to see the club grow into one of the top clubs in Europe."

In April 2022, it was announced that Bombrys would leave Scottish Rugby to take over as Chief Executive Officer at Rugby Canada.
