= Bridgehaugh Park =

Rugby union ground in Scotland

- Location in Stirling
- Location: Bridgehaugh Road, Stirling, FK9 5AP
- Coordinates: 56.1284832°N 3.9318488°W
- Owner: Stirling County RFC
- Capacity: 4,000

Tenant
- Stirling County RFC

Bridgehaugh Park is a rugby union ground in Stirling, Scotland, with a capacity of approximately 4,000.

It is the home of Stirling County RFC, who currently play in the Scottish Premiership.

== Location ==
It is situated in a meander of the River Forth in the north of the city of Stirling. Close to the river, it is very close to the site of the Battle of Stirling Bridge, a battle famously fought by Andrew Moray and William Wallace.

It lies about 1 km north of the city centre.

== Uses ==
Home to Stirling County RFC, it also hosts matches by Bridgehaugh RFC. It is used intermittently by Glasgow Warriors usually for friendly matches. It is also used by the Scotland Women's rugby team. and Scotland Men's matches at age grade.
