= 2015–16 Glasgow Warriors season =

Glasgow Warriors 2015 / 2016
- Ground: Scotstoun Stadium (Capacity: 10,000)
- Coach: (Scotland) Gregor Townsend
- Captain: (Scotland) Jonny Gray
- Most caps: (Scotland) Zander Fagerson (25)
- Top scorer: (Scotland) Duncan Weir (132)
- Most tries: (Australia) Taqele Naiyaravoro (9)
- League: Pro 12
- 3rd
1st kit	2nd kit

The 2015–16 season saw Glasgow Warriors compete in the competitions: the Guinness Pro12 and the European Champions Cup.

== Season Overview ==
The 2015–16 season began for Glasgow Warriors, for the first time, as defending champions.

In preparation for the defence of the title in a Rugby World Cup year - where it was expected that Glasgow Warriors would supply the majority of the Scotland side - Gregor Townsend assembled one of the biggest Professional squads in world rugby.

It was hoped that the large squad would see the Warriors through the early part of the season and provide enough impetus for a European challenge too.

== Team ==
=== Coaches ===
- Head coach: (Scotland) Gregor Townsend
- Assistant coach: (Scotland) Matt Taylor
- Assistant coach: (Scotland) Kenny Murray
- Assistant coach: (England) Dan McFarland

=== Squad ===
Hookers (Scotland) Fraser Brown (Scotland) Kevin Bryce (Scotland) Pat MacArthur (Scotland) James Malcolm (Georgia (country)) Shalva Mamukashvili (Scotland) Fergus Scott Props (Scotland) Alex Allan (Scotland) Michael Cusack (Scotland) Zander Fagerson (Scotland) Steven Findlay (New Zealand) Jarrod Firth (Scotland) Ryan Grant (Scotland) George Hunter (Tonga) Sila Puafisi (Scotland) D'Arcy Rae (Scotland) Gordon Reid (Canada) Djustice Sears-Duru (Wales) Javan Sebastian (Scotland) Gary Strain (Fiji) Jerry Yanuyanutawa Locks (Scotland) Scott Cummings (Scotland) Jonny Gray (Scotland) Kieran Low (Fiji) Leone Nakarawa (United States) Greg Peterson (Scotland) Tim Swinson	Loose forwards (Scotland) Adam Ashe (Scotland) Hugh Blake (Scotland) Will Bordill (Scotland) James Eddie (Italy) Simone Favaro (Scotland) Chris Fusaro (Scotland) Jason Hill (Scotland) Rob Harley (Scotland) Tyrone Holmes (Scotland) Josh Strauss (Scotland) Ryan Wilson Scrum halves (Scotland) Henry Pyrgos (Scotland) Mike Blair (Scotland) Grayson Hart (Scotland) Ali Price Fly halves (England) Rory Clegg (Scotland) Gregor Hunter (Scotland) Finn Russell (Scotland) Duncan Weir (Scotland) Scott Wight	Centres (Scotland) Mark Bennett (Scotland) Alex Dunbar (Scotland) Nick Grigg (Scotland) Peter Horne (Australia) Sam Johnson (Scotland) Fraser Lyle (Scotland) Richie Vernon Back Three (Scotland) Glenn Bryce (Scotland) Junior Bulumakau (Scotland) Nyle Godsmark (Scotland) Rory Hughes (Scotland) Lee Jones (Scotland) Sean Lamont (Australia) Taqele Naiyaravoro (Scotland) Mark Robertson (Scotland) Tommy Seymour (Scotland) Stuart Hogg (Scotland) Peter Murchie

==== BT Sport Scottish Rugby Academy Stage 3 players ====
Scottish Rugby Academy players who have been assigned to a Professional club are Stage 3 players. These players are assigned to Glasgow Warriors for the season 2015-16.

Academy players promoted in the course of the season are listed with the main squad.

- (Scotland) Cameron Fenton - Prop / Hooker
- (Scotland) Andrew Davidson - Lock
- (Scotland) Callum Hunter-Hill - Lock
- (Scotland) Kiran McDonald - Lock
- (Scotland) Michael Dewar - Flanker
- (Scotland) Bruce Flockhart - Flanker
- (Scotland) Matt Smith - Flanker
- (Scotland) Lewis Wynne - Flanker
- (Scotland) George Horne - Fly-half
- (Scotland) Robbie Fergusson - Centre

== Player statistics ==
During the 2015–16 season, Glasgow have used 56 different players in competitive games. The table below shows the number of appearances and points scored by each player.

Position	Nation	Name	Pro12			Champions Cup			Total	
Position	Nation	Name	Apps (sub)	Tries	Points kicked	Apps (sub)	Tries	Points kicked	Apps (sub)	Total pts
HK	(Scotland)	Fraser Brown	11	1	0	1(1)	0	0	12(1)	5
HK	(Scotland)	Kevin Bryce	1(2)	1	0	0	0	0	1(2)	0
HK	(Scotland)	Cameron Fenton	(1)	0	0	0	0	0	(1)	0
HK	(Scotland)	Pat MacArthur	9(3)	0	0	3	0	0	12(3)	0
HK	(Scotland)	James Malcolm	1(10)	1	0	1(1)	1	0	2(11)	10
HK	(Georgia (country))	Shalva Mamukashvili	1(1)	0	0	1(3)	0	0	2(4)	0
HK	(Scotland)	Fergus Scott	(3)	0	0	0	0	0	(3)	0
PR	(Scotland)	Alex Allan	4(3)	1	0	2(2)	0	0	6(5)	5
PR	(Scotland)	Mike Cusack	3(2)	1	0	0	0	0	3(2)	5
PR	(Scotland)	Zander Fagerson	6(13)	2	0	1(5)	0	0	7(18)	10
PR	(Scotland)	Ryan Grant	3(3)	1	0	2	0	0	5(3)	5
PR	(Tonga)	Sila Puafisi	12(3)	2	0	5(1)	0	0	17(4)	10
PR	(Scotland)	D'Arcy Rae	2(5)	0	0	0	0	0	2(5)	0
PR	(Scotland)	Gordon Reid	13(4)	3	0	2(2)	0	0	15(6)	15
PR	(Fiji)	Jerry Yanuyanutawa	3(12)	1	0	(2)	0	0	3(14)	5
LK	(Scotland)	Scott Cummings	5(3)	1	0	(1)	0	0	5(4)	5
LK	(Scotland)	Jonny Gray	8	2	0	6	0	0	14	10
LK	(Scotland)	Kieran Low	1(2)	0	0	0	0	0	1(2)	0
LK	(Fiji)	Leone Nakarawa	14(3)	5	0	6	1	0	20(3)	30
LK	(United States)	Greg Peterson	8(7)	2	0	1(1)	0	0	9(8)	10
LK	(Scotland)	Tim Swinson	7(4)	1	0	(4)	1	0	7(8)	10
BR	(Scotland)	Adam Ashe	10(3)	2	0	3	0	0	13(3)	10
BR	(Scotland)	Hugh Blake	(1)	0	0	(1)	0	0	(2)	0
BR	(Scotland)	James Eddie	1(4)	0	0	1	0	0	2(4)	0
BR	(Italy)	Simone Favaro	9(5)	3	0	4(1)	0	0	13(6)	15
BR	(Scotland)	Chris Fusaro	12(3)	1	0	2(1)	0	0	14(4)	5
BR	(Scotland)	Rob Harley	17(1)	1	0	2(1)	0	0	19(2)	5
BR	(Scotland)	Tyrone Holmes	1(5)	0	0	0	0	0	1(5)	0
BR	(Scotland)	Josh Strauss	10(3)	0	0	3(1)	0	0	13(4)	15
BR	(Scotland)	Ryan Wilson	10(4)	0	0	2(1)	0	0	12(5)	0
SH	(Scotland)	Mike Blair	4(5)	0	0	3	0	0	7(5)	0
SH	(Scotland)	Grayson Hart	9(11)	1	0	(4)	0	0	9(15)	5
SH	(Scotland)	Ali Price	5(6)	2	0	3	0	0	8(6)	10
SH	(Scotland)	Henry Pyrgos	5(1)	1	0	0	0	0	5(1)	5
FH	(England)	Rory Clegg	4(2)	0	60	0	0	0	4(2)	60
FH	(Scotland)	Gregor Hunter	1(1)	0	0	0	0	0	1(1)	0
FH	(Scotland)	Finn Russell	8(2)	2	61	5(1)	0	48	13(3)	119
FH	(Scotland)	Duncan Weir	9(3)	3	99	2(3)	1	13	11(6)	132
FH	(Scotland)	Scott Wight	1(1)	0	0	0	0	0	1(1)	0
CE	(Scotland)	Mark Bennett	11(2)	3	0	3	0	0	14(2)	15
CE	(Scotland)	Alex Dunbar	9	2	0	4	0	0	13	10
CE	(Scotland)	Robbie Fergusson	(2)	0	0	0	0	0	(2)	0
CE	(Scotland)	Nick Grigg	(1)	0	0	0	0	0	(1)	0
CE	(Scotland)	Peter Horne	9(1)	3	0	2	1	0	11(1)	20
CE	(Scotland)	Fraser Lyle	5	0	0	0	0	0	5	0
CE	(Australia)	Sam Johnson	3(4)	0	0	0	0	0	3(4)	0
CE	(Scotland)	Richie Vernon	2	0	0	(1)	0	0	2(1)	0
WG	(Scotland)	Junior Bulumakau	2(2)	1	0	0	0	0	2(2)	5
WG	(Scotland)	Rory Hughes	9	1	0	0	0	0	9	5
WG	(Scotland)	Lee Jones	11(3)	2	0	1(3)	0	0	12(6)	10
WG	(Scotland)	Sean Lamont	8(1)	1	0	4(1)	0	0	12(2)	5
WG	(Australia)	Taqele Naiyaravoro	12(4)	6	0	4(2)	3	0	16(6)	45
WG	(Scotland)	Tommy Seymour	8	2	0	4	0	0	12	10
FB	(Scotland)	Glenn Bryce	7(4)	5	0	(1)	0	0	7(5)	25
FB	(Scotland)	Stuart Hogg	9	2	3	5	1	3	14	21
FB	(Scotland)	Peter Murchie	8(1)	0	0	0	0	0	8(1)	0

== Staff movements ==
=== Coaches ===
==== Personnel in ====
- (Ireland) Dan McFarland from Connacht

==== Personnel out ====
- Shade Munro to Scotland women's national rugby union team

== Player movements ==
=== Academy promotions ===
- (Scotland) Zander Fagerson from Scottish Rugby Academy
- (Scotland) D'Arcy Rae from Scottish Rugby Academy
- (Scotland) Glenn Bryce from Scottish Rugby Academy
- (Scotland) Fergus Scott from Scottish Rugby Academy
- (Scotland) George Hunter from Scottish Rugby Academy
- (Scotland) Ali Price from Scottish Rugby Academy
- (Scotland) Scott Cummings from Scottish Rugby Academy
- (Scotland) Nick Grigg from Scottish Rugby Academy
- (Scotland) James Malcolm from Scottish Rugby Academy

=== Player transfers ===
==== In ====
- (Italy) Simone Favaro from (Italy) Benetton Treviso
- (Scotland) Grayson Hart from (Scotland) Edinburgh
- (Scotland) Kieran Low from (England) London Irish
- (Scotland) Mike Blair from (England) Newcastle Falcons
- (Australia) Sam Johnson from (Australia) Queensland Reds
- (United States) Greg Peterson from (England) Leicester Tigers
- (Fiji) Taqele Naiyaravoro from (Australia) NSW Waratahs
- (Wales) Javan Sebastian from (Wales) Scarlets
- (Scotland) Jason Hill from (Scotland) Heriot's Rugby Club
- (England) Rory Clegg from (England) Newcastle Falcons
- (Scotland) Gary Strain from (Scotland) Glasgow Hawks
- (Scotland) Steven Findlay from (Scotland) Glasgow Hawks
- Mark Robertson from Scotland 7s
- Nyle Godsmark from Scotland 7s
- (Scotland) Hugh Blake from (Scotland) Edinburgh
- (Scotland) Junior Bulumakau from (Scotland) SCOTS British Army
- Scott Wight from Scotland 7s (loan)
- (Tonga) Sila Puafisi from (England) Gloucester Rugby
- (Georgia (country)) Shalva Mamukashvili from (England) Sale Sharks
- (Scotland) Rory Hughes from (England) London Scottish (loan ends)
- (Scotland) Robbie Fergusson from (England) London Scottish (loan ends)
- (Scotland) Andrew Davidson from (England) London Scottish (loan ends)
- (New Zealand) Jarrod Firth from (New Zealand) Counties Manukau
- (England) Rory Clegg from (France) Oyonnax
- (Canada) Djustice Sears-Duru from (Canada) Ontario Blues

==== Out ====
- (Fiji) Nikola Matawalu to (England) Bath Rugby
- (Scotland) Sean Maitland to (England) London Irish
- (Canada) D. T. H. van der Merwe to (Wales) Scarlets
- (Scotland) Dougie Hall retired
- (Scotland) Jon Welsh to (England) Newcastle Falcons
- (Scotland) Alastair Kellock retired
- (Scotland) Murray McConnell to (England) Nottingham
- (Ireland) James Downey to (England) Wasps
- (Scotland) Tommy Spinks to (England) Jersey
- (Scotland) Euan Murray to (France) Pau
- Connor Braid to Canada Sevens
- (South Africa) Rossouw de Klerk released
- (England) Rory Clegg to (France) Oyonnax
- (Scotland) Robbie Fergusson to (England) London Scottish (loan)
- (Scotland) George Horne to (England) London Scottish (loan)
- (Scotland) Andrew Davidson to (England) London Scottish (loan)
- (Scotland) Nyle Godsmark to (Scotland) Melrose RFC
- (Scotland) Andy Redmayne to (Scotland) Glasgow Hawks
- Scott Wight to Scotland 7s (loan ends)
- Mark Robertson to Scotland 7s
- (Scotland) Gary Strain to (Scotland) Glasgow Hawks
- (Scotland) George Hunter to (Scotland) Ayr RFC
- (Scotland) Rory Hughes to (England) London Scottish (loan)
- (Scotland) Kieran Low to (England) Saracens (loan)
- (Scotland) Michael Cusack to (England) Newcastle Falcons
- (Scotland) Steven Findlay to (Australia) Eastern Suburbs RUFC
- (Scotland) Robbie Fergusson to (England) London Scottish
- (Scotland) Mike Blair retired
- (Scotland) James Eddie retired
- (Scotland) Andrew Davidson to (England) Newcastle Falcons
- (Scotland) Jason Hill to (England) Bedford Blues

== Competitions ==
=== Pre-season and friendlies ===
==== Match 1 ====
14 August 2015
7 pm

(France) Clermont	28 - 10	Glasgow Warriors
Try: Paul Jedrasiak; Aurélien Rougerie; Camille Gérondeau; Judicaël Cancoriet; Con: Camille Lopez x 3 Patricio Fernandez	Report	Try: Junior Bulumakau; Con: Rory Clegg; Pen: Rory Clegg

Jacques-Lavédrine Sports Complex, Issoire
Referee: Salem Attalah (France)

Glasgow Warriors:15. Peter Murchie 14. Junior Bulumakau* 13. Glenn Bryce 12. Fraser Lyle 11. Lee Jones 10. Rory Clegg 9. Grayson Hart
1. Jerry Yanuyanutawa 2. Kevin Bryce 3. D'arcy Rae 4. James Eddie 5. Kieran Low 6. Tyrone Holmes 7. Chris Fusaro (c) 8. Jason Hill
Replacements: Mark Robertson, Nick Grigg**, Robbie Fergusson **, Nyle Godsmark, Ali Price**, Will Bordill, Simone Favaro, Scott Cummings**,
Andrew Davidson**, Zander Fagerson, Pat MacArthur, Fergus Scott, George Hunter [* Trialist] [** BT Sport Scottish Rugby Academy Stage 3 Player]
Clermont: 1. Thomas Domingo (c) 2. John Ulugia 3. Clément Ric 4. Paul Jedrasiak 5. Loïc Jacquet 6. Camille Gérondeau 7. Julien Bardy 8. Fritz Lee
9. Ludovic Radosavljevic 10. Camille Lopez 11. Hosea Gear 12. Benson Stanley 13. Aurélien Rougerie 14. Adrien Planté 15. Nick Abendanon
Replacements: Viktor Kolelishvili, Raphaël Chaume, Arthur Iturria, Alexandre Lapandry, Enzo Sanga, Patricio Fernandez, Pedro Bettencourt,
Daniel Kötze, Etienne Falcoux, Judicaël Cancoriet, Calvonn Allison, Alexandre Nicoue, Albert VuliVuli, David Strettle

==== Match 2 ====
28 August 2015
7 pm

Canada	19-12	Glasgow Warriors
Try: Jamie Cudmore; Ciaran Hearn; D. T. H. van der Merwe; Con: Nathan Hirayama x 2	Report	Try: Glenn Bryce; Junior Bulumakau; Con: Scott Wight

Graves-Oakley Memorial Park, Halifax
Referee: Chris Assmus (Canada)

Canada: 15 Matt Evans, 14 Jeff Hassler, 13 Ciaran Hearn, 12 Connor Braid, 11 D. T. H. van der Merwe, 10 Nathan Hirayama, 9 Phil Mack, 8 Richard Thorpe, 7 Nanyak Dala, 6 Kyle Gilmour, 5 Jamie Cudmore (c), 4 Evan Olmstead, 3 Andrew Tiedemann, 2 Benoit Piffero, 1 Djustice Sears-Duru. Replacements: 16 Hubert Buydens, 17 Ray Barkwill, 18 Doug Wooldridge, 19 Jebb Sinclair, 20 Aaron Carpenter, 21 Jamie Mackenzie, 22 Liam Underwood, 23 Harry Jones, 24 Brett Beukeboom, 25 Phil Mackenzie.
Glasgow Warriors: 15 Peter Murchie (c), 14 Lee Jones, 13 Glenn Bryce, 12 Fraser Lyle, 11 Rory Hughes, 10 Rory Clegg, 9 Mike Blair, 8 Josh Strauss, 7 Chris Fusaro, 6 Simone Favaro, 5 Kieran Low, 4 Tim Swinson, 3 Zander Fagerson, 2 Pat MacArthur, 1 Jerry Yanuyanutawa. Replacements (all used): George Hunter, Kevin Bryce, Mike Cusack, D'arcy Rae, Scott Cummings**, James Eddie, Will Bordill, Jason Hill, Grayson Hart, Scott Wight, Mark Robertson, Robbie Fergusson**, Junior Bulumakau. [** BT Sport Scottish Rugby Academy Stage 3 Player]

==== Match 3 ====
25 September 2015
7.35 pm

Glasgow Warriors	71-0	(United Kingdom) Army Rugby Union
Try: Junior Bulumakau x 2 Scott Cummings x 2 Fraser Lyle; D'Arcy Rae; Hugh Blake; Ali Price; Chris Fusaro; George Horne; Con: Rory Clegg x 5 Gregor Hunter x 4 Pen: Rory Clegg x 1	Report

Scotstoun Stadium
Attendance: 1813

Glasgow Warriors:15. Glenn Bryce 14. Junior Bulumakau 13. Sam Johnson 12. Fraser Lyle 11. Lee Jones 10. Rory Clegg 9. Grayson Hart
1. Alex Allan 2. Fergus Scott 3. D'arcy Rae 4. Rob Harley (c) 5. Scott Cummings** 6. Tyrone Holmes 7. Hugh Blake 8. Adam Ashe
Replacements (all used): James Malcolm**, George Hunter, Zander Fagerson, Jason Hill, Callum Hunter-Hill**, Ali Price**, Gregor Hunter, Nick Grigg**,
Chris Fusaro, James Eddie, Gary Strain, Mike Cusack, Kieran Low, Robbie Fergusson **, Nyle Godsmark, George Horne**
[** BT Sport Scottish Rugby Academy Stage 3 Player]
Army Rugby Union: 1. Dowding 2. Austin 3. Budgen 4. Jones 5. Ball 6. Koroiyadi 7. Lamont 8. Boladua
9. Chennell 10. Davies 11. Nlalaugo 12. Wessells 13. Nakamavuto 14. Watkins 15. Leatham
Replacements: Dwyer, Hamilton, McLaren, Bates, Llewellyn, Nayacavou, Vata, Prasad, O'Reilly

=== Pro12 ===
At the start of the season, Glasgow Warriors were missing 21 players on Rugby World Cup duty in various international squads, more than any other club in world rugby.

That wasn't all. The Australian international, Taqele Naiyaravoro, Glasgow's marquee signing of the season, was stuck in Australia awaiting a visa. He wouldn't arrive in Glasgow until October and he played his first match against Newport Gwent Dragons on 16 October 2015.

In addition to losing players to the World Cup and visa hold-ups Glasgow had a run of injuries at the start of the season. Alex Dunbar & Sam Johnson were injured for the opener against Scarlets and that injury list grew with stand-in captain Peter Murchie being injured for 3–4 months.

A spate of injuries to Glasgow's recognised hookers caused the Warriors to sign Shalva Mamukashvili from Sale Sharks. The hooker injury list included Kevin Bryce, Fraser Brown, Pat MacArthur and new academy promotion Fergus Scott. Mamukashvili and academy players James Malcolm and Cameron Fenton were called on to avert the Hooker crisis.

The season was to get even worse for the Warriors as, due to flooding, Scotstoun became unplayable over the winter. Glasgow's 1872 Cup home match against Edinburgh Rugby was played at Murrayfield, Edinburgh's home! In addition Glasgow had to move other home matches to Rugby Park in Kilmarnock.

Losing both matches to Edinburgh left Glasgow at one point sitting 9th in the Pro12 league table. However, as the club managed to get Scotstoun playable again and their World Cup players gradually got back to domestic ways, Glasgow slowly climbed back up the table. A 9-game winning streak saw Glasgow manage to climb to the top of the table and secure a semi-final play-off place.

Away to Connacht in the final league match of the season, victory would have secured Glasgow a home semi final and first place. Instead Connacht ground out a tight match which meant Glasgow finished third; with Leinster securing top spot by a single point.

This meant that Glasgow had to travel back to Connacht for an away semi-final. Another bruising match followed with two Glasgow Warriors players Russell and Fagerson colliding when tackling Connacht's Bundee Aki in the first minutes, immediately putting Glasgow on the back foot. Russell ended in hospital - and by the end of the game Simone Favaro, Johnny Gray, D'Arcy Rae and Josh Strauss all suffered injuries. Connacht ground out another win and found themselves in the Edinburgh final against Leinster to end Glasgow's championship defence.

==== League table ====
2015–16 Pro12
	Team	Played	Won	Drawn	Lost	Points For	Points Against	Points Diff	Tries For	Tries Against	Try Bonus	Losing Bonus	Points
1	(Ireland) Leinster (RU)	22	16	0	6	458	290	+168	51	27	6	3	73
2	(Ireland) Connacht (CH)	22	15	0	7	507	406	+101	60	46	8	5	73
3	(Scotland) Glasgow Warriors (SF)	22	14	1	7	557	380	+177	68	37	8	6	72
4	(Ireland) Ulster (SF)	22	14	0	8	488	307	+181	61	29	8	5	69
5	(Wales) Scarlets	22	14	0	8	477	458	+19	45	54	2	5	63
6	(Ireland) Munster	22	13	0	9	459	417	+42	56	36	6	5	63
7	(Wales) Cardiff Blues	22	11	0	11	542	461	+81	62	53	5	7	56
8	(Wales) Ospreys	22	11	1	10	490	455	+35	55	49	6	3	55
9	(Scotland) Edinburgh	22	11	0	11	405	366	+39	41	36	2	8	54
10	(Wales) Newport Gwent Dragons	22	4	0	18	353	492	−139	33	57	0	10	26
11	(Italy) Zebre	22	5	0	17	308	718	−410	35	99	3	1	24
12	(Italy) Benetton Treviso	22	3	0	19	320	614	−294	35	79	0	8	20
If teams are level at any stage, tiebreakers are applied in the following order: 1. number of matches won; 2. the difference between points for and points against; 3. the number of tries scored; 4. the most points scored; 5. the difference between tries for and tries against; 6. the fewest red cards received; 7. the fewest yellow cards received.
Green background (rows 1 to 4) were play-off places, and earned places in the 2016–17 European Rugby Champions Cup. Blue background indicates teams outside the play-off places that earned places in the European Rugby Champions Cup. To facilitate the 2015 Rugby World Cup, there were no play-offs for the 2016–17 European Rugby Champions Cup; the 20th place went to the winner of the 2015–16 European Rugby Challenge Cup if not already qualified. Because Challenge Cup winner Montpellier qualified via the Top 14, its place passed to the top team from that league not already qualified. Plain background indicates teams that earned a place in the 2016–17 European Rugby Challenge Cup.

==== Results ====
===== Round 1 =====
5 September 2015
17:15

(1 BP) Glasgow Warriors (Scotland)	10–16	(Wales) Scarlets
Try: Cusack 45' m G. Bryce 79' m	Report	Try: A. Shingler 4' m Parkes 19' m Pen: D. Jones (2/3) 28', 54'

Scotstoun Stadium
Attendance: 6,562
Referee: Gary Conway (IRFU)

===== Round 2 =====
11 September 2015
19:35

Glasgow Warriors (Scotland)	33–32	(Ireland) Connacht (2 BP)
Try: G. Bryce 30' c Cummings 35' c Harley 41' c Con: Clegg (3/3); Pen: Clegg (4/4) 10', 22', 27', 68'	Report	Try: Jo. Cooney 46' c penalty try 56' c Poolman 59' m Fox-Matamua 75' c Con: Carty (3/4); Pen: Carty (2/2) 7', 39'

Scotstoun Stadium
Attendance: 6,267
Referee: Ian Davies (WRU)

===== Round 3 =====
2 October 2015
18:00

Munster (Ireland)	23–21	(Scotland) Glasgow Warriors (1 BP)
Try: O'Callaghan 28' c Botha 66' c Con: Keatley (2/2); Pen: Keatley (3/4) 19', 40', 77'	Report	Pen: Clegg (6/7) 12', 32', 38', 51', 55', 60'; Drop: Clegg (1/1) 74'

Thomond Park
Referee: Ben Whitehouse (WRU)

===== Round 4 =====
16 October 2015
19:35

(1 BP) Glasgow Warriors (Scotland)	29–15	(Wales) Newport Gwent Dragons
Try: Fusaro 35' c Fagerson 54' c Bulumakau 69' m Favaro 79' c Con: Clegg (3/4); Pen: Clegg (1/2) 12'	Report	Try: Landman 23' c Hewitt 72' m Con: Tovey (1/2); Pen: Tovey (1/2) 40'

Scotstoun Stadium
Attendance: 6,641
Referee: Gary Conway (IRFU)

===== Round 5 =====
23 October 2015
19:45

Leinster (Ireland)	23–18	(Scotland) Glasgow Warriors (1 BP)
Try: L. McGrath 42' c penalty try 64' c Con: McFadden (2/2); Pen: McFadden (3/4) 16', 21', 80'	Report	Try: Fagerson 13' c Naiyaravoro 48' m Con: Weir (1/2); Pen: Weir (2/3) 26', 34'

RDS Arena
Attendance: 11,089
Referee: Ian Davies (WRU)

===== Round 6 =====
1 November 2015
14:30

(1 BP) Glasgow Warriors (Scotland)	31–19	(Wales) Ospreys
Try: Lamont 29' m Peterson 50' c Allan 63' m Naiyaravoro 80' m Con: Weir (1/4); Pen: Weir (3/4) 2', 43', 55'	Report	Try: Baker 73' c Con: Biggar (1/1); Pen: Biggar (4/5) 6', 13', 37', 46'

Scotstoun Stadium
Attendance: 6,650
Referee: Peter Fitzgibbon (IRFU)

===== Round 7 =====
7 November 2015
15:00

(1 BP) Cardiff Blues (Wales)	30–35	(Scotland) Glasgow Warriors (1 BP)
Try: G. Evans 30' m penalty try 78' c Con: Patchell (1/2); Pen: Patchell (6/6) 7', 12', 19', 37', 58', 63'	Report	Try: Nakarawa 25' m Naiyaravoro 38' c Grant 68' c Gray 73' c Con: Russell (3/4); Pen: Russell (3/3) 5', 41', 75'

Cardiff Arms Park
Attendance: 5,704
Referee: Marius Mitrea (FIR)

===== Round 8 =====
27 November 2015
19:35

Glasgow Warriors (Scotland)	13–6	(Italy) Benetton Treviso (1 BP)
Try: Ashe 72' c Con: Weir (1/1); Pen: Russell (1/1) 3'; Weir (1/1) 78'	Report	Pen: Hayward (2/4) 9', 32'

Scotstoun Stadium
Attendance: 6,634
Referee: David Wilkinson (IRFU)

===== Round 9 =====
5 December 2015
15:00

Glasgow Warriors (Scotland)	P–P	(Ireland) Leinster
	Postponed due to a waterlogged pitch.

Scotstoun Stadium
Referee: Nigel Owens (WRU)

===== Round 10 - 1872 Cup 1st leg =====
27 December 2015
15:05

Edinburgh (Scotland)	23–11	(Scotland) Glasgow Warriors
Try: Scott 12' c Hardie 69' c Con: Hidalgo-Clyne (2/2); Pen: Hidalgo-Clyne (3/4) 30', 50', 59'	Report	Try: Bennett 6' m Pen: Russell (2/2) 47', 56'

Murrayfield Stadium
Attendance: 23,642
Referee: John Lacey (IRFU)

===== Round 11 - 1872 Cup 2nd leg =====
2 January 2016
17:15

(1 BP) Glasgow Warriors (Scotland)	11–14	(Scotland) Edinburgh
Try: Bennett 31' m Pen: Weir (2/2) 5', 54'	Report	Try: Burleigh 74' m Pen: Hidalgo-Clyne (3/4) 16', 25', 67'

Murrayfield Stadium
Attendance: 8,000
Referee: Peter Fitzgibbon (IRFU)

Edinburgh Rugby won the 1872 Cup with an aggregate score of 37 - 22.

===== Round 12 =====
9 January 2016
14:30

Zebre (Italy)	P–P	(Scotland) Glasgow Warriors

Stadio Sergio Lanfranchi

===== Round 13 =====
31 January 2016
14:30

Ospreys (Wales)	20–20	(Scotland) Glasgow Warriors
Try: Walker 23' c D. Evans 68' c Con: S. Davies (2/2); Pen: S. Davies (2/4) 19', 43'	Report	Try: Hughes 26' c Reid 53' c Con: Weir (2/2); Pen: Weir (2/4) 3', 7'

Liberty Stadium
Attendance: 7,239
Referee: Peter Fitzgibbon (IRFU)

===== Round 14 =====
12 February 2016
19:30

Ulster (Ireland)	13–10	(Scotland) Glasgow Warriors (1 BP)
Try: Black 52' c Con: Pad. Jackson (1/1); Pen: Pienaar (1/2) 22'; Pad. Jackson (1/1) 66'	Report	Try: Jones 9' m Naiyaravoro 80' m

Kingspan Stadium
Attendance: 16,477
Referee: Marius Mitrea (FIR)

===== Round 15 =====
19 February 2016
19:35

(1 BP) Glasgow Warriors (Scotland)	27–24	(Ireland) Munster (1 BP)
Try: Puafisi (2) 4' c, 7' c Weir 43' m G. Bryce 70' m Con: Weir (2/4); Pen: Weir (1/3) 62'	Report	Try: Kilcoyne (2) 11' c, 23' c Sherry 63' c Con: Keatley (3/3); Pen: Keatley (1/1) 17'

Rugby Park
Attendance: 7,212
Referee: Ben Whitehouse (WRU)

===== Round 16 =====
25 February 2016
19:05

(1 BP) Newport Gwent Dragons (Wales)	15–18	(Scotland) Glasgow Warriors
Pen: O'Brien (5/6) 3', 13', 16', 27', 48'	Report	Try: Dunbar 42' c Weir 72' m Con: Weir (1/2); Pen: Weir (2/3) 10', 25'

Rodney Parade
Attendance: 4,526
Referee: Gary Conway (IRFU)

===== Round 17 =====
6 March 2016
14:30

Glasgow Warriors (Scotland)	27–20	(Wales) Cardiff Blues (1 BP)
Try: Reid 9' c Swinson 40' c Favaro 74' c Con: Weir (3/3); Pen: Weir (2/2) 6', 20'	Report	Try: Fish 72' m E. Jenkins 79' c Cook 80' m Con: Patchell (1/3); Pen: Patchell (1/1) 56'

Scotstoun Stadium
Attendance: 6,492
Referee: Dudley Phillips (IRFU)

===== Round 9 rescheduled match =====
18 March 2016
19:35

Glasgow Warriors (Scotland)	12–6	(Ireland) Leinster (1 BP)
Pen: Clegg (4/4) 14', 17', 50', 58'	Report	Pen: Nacewa (2/3) 3', 30'

Scotstoun Stadium
Attendance: 6,800
Referee: George Clancy (IRFU)

This match – originally scheduled to be held during Round 9, on 5 December 2015 – was postponed due to a waterlogged pitch.

===== Round 18 =====
25 March 2016
19:35

Glasgow Warriors (Scotland)	27–17	(Ireland) Ulster
Try: Hogg 58' m Seymour 61' c Con: Russell (1/2); Pen: Russell (4/6) 23', 28', 39', 72'; Hogg (1/1) 80'	Report	Try: Henderson 3' c McCloskey 44' c Con: Pad. Jackson (2/2); Pen: Pad. Jackson (1/1) 34'

Scotstoun Stadium
Attendance: 6,800
Referee: John Lacey (IRFU)

===== Round 19 =====
2 April 2016
17:30

Benetton Treviso (Italy)	16–38	(Scotland) Glasgow Warriors (1 BP)
Try: Esposito 35' c Con: Hayward (1/1); Pen: Hayward (3/3) 14', 18', 39'	Report	Try: Gray 11' c Horne 28' c Favaro 42' c Hogg 59' m Hart 67' m Malcolm 73' c Con: Russell (4/6)

Stadio Comunale di Monigo
Attendance: 3,500
Referee: Ben Whitehouse (WRU)

===== Round 12 rescheduled match =====
8 April 2016
19:30

Zebre (Italy)	14–43	(Scotland) Glasgow Warriors (1 BP)
Try: L. Sarto 3' c Palazzani 20' c Con: Canna (2/2)	Report	Try: Brown 16' c Price 46' c Dunbar 51' c Horne (2) 57' c, 77' m Naiyaravoro 72' m Yanuyanutawa 75' m Con: Weir (3/3); Russell (1/4)

Stadio Sergio Lanfranchi
Attendance: 1,850
Referee: Ian Davies (WRU)

This match – originally scheduled to be held during Round 12, on 8 January 2016 – was postponed due to a European Rugby Champions Cup fixture rearrangement that occurred as a result of the Paris terrorist attacks in November 2015.

===== Round 20 =====
16 April 2016
15:15

Scarlets (Wales)	10–46	(Scotland) Glasgow Warriors (1 BP)
Try: L. Williams 30' c Con: S. Shingler (1/1); Pen: S. Shingler (1/1) 2'	Report	Try: Russell (2) 6' c, 25' m Jones (2) 37' m, 73' m Pyrgos 41' c Bennett 58' c Seymour 64' c Con: Russell (4/7); Pen: Russell (1/1) 18'

Parc y Scarlets
Attendance: 8,165
Referee: George Clancy (IRFU)

===== Round 21 =====
29 April 2016
19:35

(1 BP) Glasgow Warriors (Scotland)	70–10	(Italy) Zebre
Try: Nakarawa (3) 15' c, 42' c, 52' c Ashe 23' c G. Bryce (2) 30' c, 36' c Naiyaravoro 33' c Peterson 63' c Price 65' c Weir 73' c Con: Weir (10/10)	Report	Try: Van Zyl 17' m Boni 38' m

Scotstoun Stadium
Attendance: 6,800
Referee: Andrew Brace (IRFU)

===== Round 22 =====
7 May 2016
15:00

Connacht (Ireland)	14–7	(Scotland) Glasgow Warriors (1 BP)
Try: Aki 18' c O'Halloran 59' c Con: MacGinty (1/1); O'Leary (1/1)	Report	Try: Reid 46' c Con: Russell (1/1)

Galway Sportsgrounds
Referee: Ian Davies (WRU)

==== Play-offs ====
===== Semi-final =====
21 May 2016
18:30

Connacht (Ireland)	16–11	(Scotland) Glasgow Warriors
Try: Adeolokun 36' c Con: MacGinty (1/1); Pen: MacGinty (3/3) 24', 52', 64'	Report	Try: Nakarawa 48' m Pen: Weir (2/2) 26', 56'

Galway Sportsgrounds
Attendance: 7,800
Referee: Marius Mitrea (FIR)

=== Europe ===
By virtue of winning the Pro12 in 2014–15, Glasgow Warriors were seeded as top seeds in the European Champions Cup pool stages. Drawn with Racing 92, Northampton Saints and Scarlets, it was a tough group.

Townsend had predicted that four wins out of six would be needed to qualify. Glasgow secured a home win against Racing and home and away wins against Scarlets. Three wins might have been enough had the group been tighter but unfortunately Scarlets proved the whipping boy of the group and it was Glasgow's losses to Northampton Saints home and away which ended the Warriors hopes of progress.

==== Pool 3 ====
Team	P	W	D	L	PF	PA	Diff	TF	TA	TB	LB	Pts
(France) Racing 92 (3)	6	4	1	1	174	70	+104	23	6	4	0	22
(England) Northampton Saints (8)	6	4	1	1	94	93	+1	12	9	1	0	19
(Scotland) Glasgow Warriors	6	3	0	3	114	96	+18	10	11	1	1	14
(Wales) Scarlets	6	0	0	6	59	182	–123	7	25	0	2	2

==== Results ====
===== Round 1 =====
14 November 2015
16:15

Racing 92 (France)	P–P	(Scotland) Glasgow Warriors

Stade Yves-du-Manoir
Referee: JP Doyle (RFU)

===== Round 2 =====
21 November 2015
17:15

Glasgow Warriors (Scotland)	15–26	(England) Northampton Saints
Try: P. Horne 33' c Strauss 57' m Con: Russell (1/2) 35'; Pen: Russell (1/3) 5'	Report	Try: G. Pisi 7' c Tuala (2) 29' m, 51' m Con: Myler (1/3) 7'; Pen: Myler (3/3) 15', 21', 40'

Scotstoun Stadium
Attendance: 6,800
Referee: Pascal Gaüzère (FFR)

===== Round 3 =====
12 December 2015
13:00

(1 BP) Glasgow Warriors (Scotland)	43–6	(Wales) Scarlets
Try: Weir 6' c Malcolm 52' c Naiyaravoro (3) 56' c, 69' c, 73' m Swinson 80' c Con: Weir (2/2) 7' 53'; Russell (3/4) 57' 70' 80+1'; Pen: Weir (1/1) 39'	Report	Pen: Shingler (2/2) 11', 46'

Scotstoun Stadium
Attendance: 6,576
Referee: Mathieu Raynal (FFR)

===== Round 4 =====
19 December 2015
19:45

(1 BP) Scarlets (Wales)	6–9	(Scotland) Glasgow Warriors
Pen: Thomas (2/4) 54', 67'	Report	Pen: Russell (3/4) 4', 26', 45'

Parc y Scarlets
Attendance: 5,767
Referee: Pascal Gaüzère (FFR)

===== Round 1 rescheduled =====
9 January 2016
13:00

(1 BP) Racing 92 (France)	34–10	(Scotland) Glasgow Warriors
Try: Tameifuna 28' c Szarzewski 43' c Ben Arous 50' c Carizza 80' c Con: Carter (3/3) 29', 44', 51'; Goosen (1/1) 80'; Pen: Carter (2/2) 24', 38'	Report	Try: Nakarawa 59' c Con: Russell (1/1) 59'; Pen: Russell (1/2) 14'

Stade Yves-du-Manoir
Attendance: 8,133
Referee: John Lacey (IRFU)

===== Round 5 =====
17 January 2016
17:30

Northampton Saints (England)	19–15	(Scotland) Glasgow Warriors (1 BP)
Try: Harrison 9' c Day 51' m Mallinder 78' c Con: Hanrahan (1/2) 10'; Myler (1/1) 80'	Report	Pen: Russell (4/6) 23', 32', 47', 56'; Hogg (1/2) 70'

Franklin's Gardens
Attendance: 14,874
Referee: Romain Poite (FFR)

===== Round 6 =====
23 January 2016
17:30

Glasgow Warriors (Scotland)	22–5	(France) Racing 92
Try: Hogg 55' c Con: Russell (1/1) 56'; Pen: Russell (3/3) 7', 47', 61'; Weir (2/2) 69', 76'	Report	Try: Khinchagishvili 65' m Con: Dulin (0/1)

Rugby Park
Attendance: 9,063
Referee: Wayne Barnes (RFU)

== Warrior of the month awards ==
Award	Winner
September	no award
October	(Scotland) Mike Blair
November	(Fiji) Leone Nakarawa
December	(Australia) Taqele Naiyaravoro
January	(Scotland) Jonny Gray
February	(Scotland) Josh Strauss
March	(Fiji) Leone Nakarawa
April	no award
May	no award

== End of Season awards ==
Award	Winner
Young Player of the Season	(Scotland) Zander Fagerson
Coaches Award	(Scotland) James Eddie
Test Player of the Season	(Scotland) Stuart Hogg
Most Improved Player of the Season	(Scotland) Ali Price
Al Kellock Leadership Award	(Scotland) Mike Blair
Community Club of the Season	Cumnock
Try of the Season	(Scotland) Duncan Weir vs. (Ireland) Munster
Players' Player of the Season	(Fiji) Leone Nakarawa
Player of the Season	(Italy) Simone Favaro

== Competitive debuts this season ==
A player's nationality shown is taken from the nationality at the highest honour for the national side obtained; or if never capped internationally their place of birth. Senior caps take precedence over junior caps or place of birth; junior caps take precedence over place of birth. A player's nationality at debut may be different from the nationality shown. Combination sides like the British and Irish Lions or Pacific Islanders are not national sides, or nationalities.

Players in BOLD font have been capped by their senior international XV side as nationality shown.

Players in Italic font have capped either by their international 7s side; or by the international XV 'A' side as nationality shown.

Players in normal font have not been capped at senior level.

A position in parentheses indicates that the player debuted as a substitute. A player may have made a prior debut for Glasgow Warriors in a non-competitive match, 'A' match or 7s match; these matches are not listed.

Tournaments where competitive debut made:

**Scottish Inter-District Championship**	**Welsh–Scottish League**	**WRU Challenge Cup**	**Celtic League**	**Celtic Cup**	**1872 Cup**	**Pro12**	**Pro14**	**Rainbow Cup**	**United Rugby Championship**	**European Challenge Cup**	**Heineken Cup / European Champions Cup**

Crosshatching indicates a jointly hosted match.

Number	Player nationality	Name	Position	Date of debut	Venue	Stadium	Opposition nationality	Opposition side	Tournament	Match result	Scoring debut
244	(Scotland)	**Scott Cummings**	Lock	2015-09-05	Home	Scotstoun Stadium	(Wales)	Scarlets	Pro12	Loss	Nil
245	(Scotland)	**Grayson Hart**	Scrum half	2015-09-05	Home	Scotstoun Stadium	(Wales)	Scarlets	Pro12	Loss	Nil
246	(Scotland)	Fergus Scott	(Hooker)	2015-09-05	Home	Scotstoun Stadium	(Wales)	Scarlets	Pro12	Loss	Nil
247	(Scotland)	**Kieran Low**	(Lock)	2015-09-05	Home	Scotstoun Stadium	(Wales)	Scarlets	Pro12	Loss	Nil
248	(Scotland)	**Mike Blair**	(Scrum half)	2015-09-05	Home	Scotstoun Stadium	(Wales)	Scarlets	Pro12	Loss	Nil
249	(England)	Rory Clegg	(Fly half)	2015-09-05	Home	Scotstoun Stadium	(Wales)	Scarlets	Pro12	Loss	Nil
250	(Scotland)	Robbie Fergusson	(Centre)	2015-09-05	Home	Scotstoun Stadium	(Wales)	Scarlets	Pro12	Loss	Nil
251	(Scotland)	Junior Bulumakau	Wing	2015-09-11	Home	Scotstoun Stadium	(Ireland)	Connacht	Pro12	Win	Nil
252	(Scotland)	**Hugh Blake**	(Centre)	2015-09-11	Home	Scotstoun Stadium	(Ireland)	Connacht	Pro12	Win	Nil
253	(Scotland)	Gregor Hunter	(Fly half)	2015-10-02	Away	Thomond Park	(Ireland)	Munster	Pro12	Loss	Nil
254	(Australia)	**Taqele Naiyaravoro**	Wing	2015-10-16	Home	Scotstoun Stadium	(Wales)	Dragons	Pro12	Win	Nil
255	(United States)	**Greg Peterson**	(Lock)	2015-10-16	Home	Scotstoun Stadium	(Wales)	Dragons	Pro12	Win	Nil
256	(Italy)	**Simone Favaro**	(Flanker)	2015-10-16	Home	Scotstoun Stadium	(Wales)	Dragons	Pro12	Win	5 pts
257	(Tonga)	**Sila Puafisi**	Prop	2015-11-01	Home	Scotstoun Stadium	(Wales)	Ospreys	Pro12	Win	Nil
258	(Scotland)	**Sam Johnson**	(Centre)	2015-11-01	Home	Scotstoun Stadium	(Wales)	Ospreys	Pro12	Win	Nil
259	(Scotland)	James Malcolm	(Hooker)	2015-11-07	Away	Cardiff Arms Park	(Wales)	Cardiff Blues	Pro12	Win	Nil
260	(Georgia (country))	**Shalva Mamukashvili**	(Prop)	2015-11-21	Home	Scotstoun Stadium	(England)	Northampton Saints	European Champions Cup	Loss	Nil
261	(Scotland)	Cameron Fenton	(Hooker)	2016-02-19	Home	Rugby Park	(Ireland)	Munster	Pro12	Win	Nil
262	(Scotland)	**Nick Grigg**	(Centre)	2016-03-18	Home	Scotstoun Stadium	(Ireland)	Leinster	Pro12	Win	Nil

== Sponsorship ==
- BT Sport
- Rowan Glen
- McCrea Financial Services
- Malcolm Group
- QBE Insurance
- Scot JCB

=== Official kit supplier ===
Macron
