= 2016–17 Edinburgh Rugby season =

Edinburgh 2016 / 2017
- Ground(s): Murrayfield Stadium, New Myreside
- CEO: (Scotland) Jon Petrie
- Coach: (South Africa) Alan Solomons
- Captain: tbc
- League: Pro 12
1st kit	2nd kit

The 2016–17 season was Edinburgh Rugby's sixteenth season competing in the Pro12.

== Team ==
=== Coaches ===
Coaches

- Alan Solomons (Head coach)
- Stevie Scott (Forwards coach)
- Duncan Hodge (Backs coach)
- Peter Wilkins (Defence coach)

Other coaches

- Marc Keys (Assistant S&C Coach)
- Ben Atiga (Player and Skills Coach)
- Murray Fleming (Lead performance analyst)
- Paul Larter (Performance analyst)

=== Squad ===
Hookers (Scotland) Neil Cochrane (Scotland) Ross Ford (Scotland) Stuart McInally (Scotland) George Turner Props (New Zealand) Simon Berghan (Scotland) Nick Beavon (Scotland) Kevin Bryce (Scotland) Jack Cosgrove ^{SRA} (South Africa) Allan Dell (Scotland) Alasdair Dickinson (Scotland) Rory Sutherland (Scotland) WP Nel Locks (Namibia) Anton Bresler (Scotland) Lewis Carmichael (Scotland) Grant Gilchrist (Scotland) Fraser McKenzie (Scotland) Ben Toolis	Loose forwards (Scotland) Magnus Bradbury (South Africa) Cornell du Preez (Tonga) Viliami Fihaki (Scotland) John Hardie (New Zealand) Nasi Manu (Scotland) Jamie Ritchie (Scotland) Hamish Watson Half backs (England) Nathan Fowles (Scotland) Sam Hidalgo-Clyne (Scotland) Sean Kennedy Stand offs (Wales) Jason Tovey (Scotland) Duncan Weir	Centres (Ireland) Michael Allen (New Zealand) Phil Burleigh (Scotland) Chris Dean (Australia) Junior Rasolea (Samoa) Sasa Tofilau Back Three (Scotland) Tom Brown (Scotland) Glenn Bryce (Scotland) Blair Kinghorn (Tonga) Will Helu (Scotland) Damien Hoyland (Australia) Alex Northam (Ireland) Rory Scholes

(c) Denotes team captain,
Italicised denotes Scottish qualified

== Transfers ==
=== Personnel In ===
- (Scotland) Duncan Weir from (Scotland) Glasgow Warriors
- (Ireland) Rory Scholes from (Ireland) Ulster
- (Scotland) Glenn Bryce from (Scotland) Glasgow Warriors
- (Australia) Junior Rasolea from (Australia) Western Force
- (Scotland) Kevin Bryce from (Scotland) Glasgow Warriors
- (Australia) Alex Northam from (France) La Rochelle
- (Samoa) Sasa Tofilau from (Scotland) Kirkaldy RFC
- (Tonga) Viliami Fihaki from Sale Sharks

=== Players Out ===
- (Scotland) Matt Scott to (England) Gloucester Rugby
- (New Zealand) Mike Coman to (England) London Irish
- (New Zealand) Sam Beard to (Wales) Newport Gwent Dragons
- (Scotland) Greig Tonks to (England) London Irish
- (Ireland) John Andress to (Ireland) Munster
