= Scottish national team =

Scottish national team may refer to:

- Scotland national Australian rules football team
- Scotland national badminton team
- Scotland national basketball team
  - Scotland women's national basketball team
- Scotland national cricket team
  - Scotland national under-19 cricket team
- Scotland national football team
  - Scotland national cerebral palsy football team
  - Scotland national B football team
  - Scotland national under-16 football team
  - Scotland national under-17 football team
  - Scotland national under-19 football team
  - Scotland national under-20 football team
  - Scotland national under-21 football team
  - Scotland national under-23 football team
  - Scotland national semi-professional football team
- Scotland national ice hockey team
  - Scotland women's national ice hockey team
- Scotland national indoor lacrosse team
  - Scotland women's national lacrosse team
- Scotland national korfball team
- Scotland national kabaddi team
- Scotland national netball team
- Scotland national roller derby team
- Scotland national rugby league team
  - Scotland A national rugby league team
- Scotland national rugby union team
  - Scotland national under-16 rugby union team
  - Scotland national under-17 rugby union team
  - Scotland national under-18 rugby union team
  - Scotland national under-19 rugby union team
  - Scotland national under-20 rugby union team
  - Scotland national under-21 rugby union team
  - Scotland A national rugby union team
  - Scotland national women's rugby union team
- Scotland national rugby sevens team
  - Scotland women's national rugby sevens team
  - Scotland A national rugby union team
- Scotland national shinty team
- Scotland men's national field hockey team
- Scotland men's national squash team
- Scotland women's national cricket team
- Scotland women's national field hockey team
- Scotland women's national football team
  - Scotland women's national under-17 football team
  - Scotland women's national under-23 football team
- Scotland women's national squash team
