= Mike Adamson (rugby union) =

Scottish rugby union player, coach, & referee (born 1984)

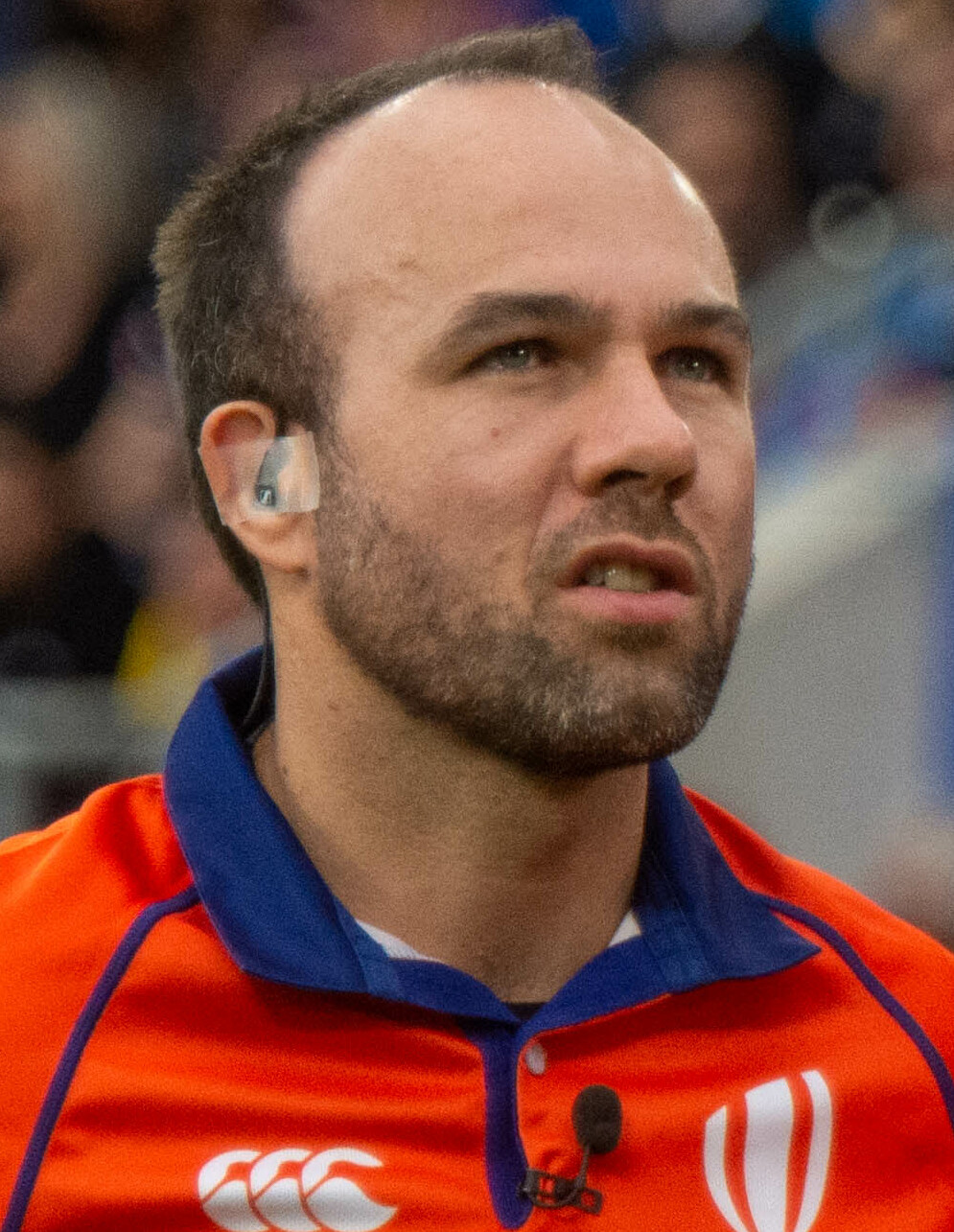
- Born: Michael Charles Adamson; 17 May 1984 (age 42) Stirling, Scotland
- Height: 1.75 m (5 ft 9 in)
- Weight: 75 kg (11 st 11 lb)
- School: Dollar Academy
- University: Glasgow University
- Occupation: Rugby union referee

Rugby union career
- Position: Fly-half
Amateur team(s)
Years	Team	Apps	(Points)
2003-14	Glasgow Hawks		
Senior career
Years	Team	Apps	(Points)
2006-10	Glasgow Warriors	1	(0)
2011-12	London Scottish	1	(0)
International career
Years	Team	Apps	(Points)
- Scotland U16
- Scotland U17
- Scotland U18
- Scotland U19
- Scotland U21
2006	Scotland Club XV		
National sevens team
Years	Team		Comps
2006-2011	Scotland 7s		30
Coaching career
- Years: Team
- 2012-14: Glasgow Hawks (Development Manager)
Refereeing career
Years	Competition		Apps
2016-17	Pro12		8
2017-	Pro14		25
2019-	Super 6		3
2021-	Six Nations		3

Mike Adamson (born 17 May 1984) is a former Scotland 7s international rugby union player and now referee. His primary playing position was at fly-half. Adamson played professionally for Glasgow Warriors and London Scottish and at amateur level for Glasgow Hawks. Adamson is now a SRU referee for the Pro14, European Professional Club Rugby and World Rugby .

== Rugby union career ==
=== Playing career ===
==== Amateur career ====
Adamson was born in Stirling, Scotland. He played for Glasgow Hawks. He played with the Hawks for 11 years. He helped Glasgow Hawks to National Cup victory in 2007.

==== Professional career ====
Adamson went on to play for Glasgow Warriors, first securing a part-time contract in 2006. At the start of 2006–07 season he played in two pre-season friendlies against Moseley and Newcastle Falcons. He also played for Glasgow Warriors in a friendly at the end of the 2006–07 season against Scotland U20s, scoring a try and four conversions in the match.

He then secured a full-time contract with the Glasgow side in May 2007. He was involved in all 3 pre-season matches for the Warriors in 2007–08 season. He made his only competitive appearance for the Warriors in the Celtic League on 4 January 2008 against Newport Gwent Dragons.

Although he stayed with the Warriors until 2010 he was unable to gain more competitive appearances, finding himself behind Dan Parks and Ruaridh Jackson for the fly-half berth.

He moved on to play for London Scottish but he was to similarly play only 1 competitive match for the exile side, against London Welsh in the 2011–12 season.

==== International career ====
Adamson played for Scotland through the age grades:- Scotland U16, U17, U18, U19, U21 and Club XV.

He received senior caps for the Scotland 7s side. He was Scotland 7s player of the season in 2006-07 and went on to play in 30 World Rugby 7s events. He was a Plate Winner in the 2009 Dubai tournament and represented Scotland at the Commonwealth Games in Delhi.

=== Referee career ===
When Adamson finished playing professional rugby he turned to refereeing. He stated: "Former players usually go down the coaching route after retirement but I feel I will be able to achieve more through refereeing. I have gained a lot from rugby and would like to give back to the sport."

He has worked his way up the refereeing ladder, officiating in the Anglo-Welsh Cup in England, the Currie Cup in South Africa as well as PRO D2 in France. His refereeing progress and development has been deemed a rapid rise. He has now also refereed in Japan's Top League.

Adamson has been refereeing World 7s matches since 2014. He was appointed to the Refereeing Panel for the Olympic Games Rugby Sevens for Rio 2016.

He refereed his first Pro12 match on 26 November 2016; the match Munster versus Treviso. He became the first ex-player to play and referee in the Celtic League / Pro 12 league. He refereed the 2nd Leg of the 1872 Cup between Glasgow Warriors and Edinburgh Rugby at the end of the 2016–17 season.

He was named as one of the 9 referees that will take charge of the World Rugby U20 Championships in Georgia 2017.

He refereed his first Super 6 match on 21 December 2019.

On 20 November 2021, Adamson refereed his first tier one International Match between Wales and Australia.

On 6 August 2022, Adamson refereed his first Rugby Championship International Match between Argentina and Australia.
