= Alan Dymock =

Scottish rugby union player

- Born: 24 May 1987 (age 39) Dundee, Scotland
- School: High School of Dundee
- University: University of Dundee; University of Abertay; University of London
- Occupation: Journalist

Rugby union career
- Position: Prop
Amateur team(s)
Years	Team	Apps	(Points)
- Dundee HSFP
2008-12	Heriots		
Senior career
Years	Team	Apps	(Points)
2006–07	Edinburgh		
2007-08	Glasgow Warriors		
International career
Years	Team	Apps	(Points)
- Scotland U19
- Scotland U20
2008-12	Scotland Club XV		

Alan Dymock (born 24 May 1987 in Dundee, Scotland) is a Scottish rugby union journalist. He was previously a player for Glasgow Warriors, Edinburgh, Dundee HSFP and Heriots. He played at an international level for the Scotland Club XV. He played as a Prop.

== Rugby Union career ==
=== Amateur career ===
Dymock started playing at Dundee HSFP with his brothers Neil, who was also a prop, and Andy, who was a scrum half. His father Tom was a past president and former coach at the club.

In 2008, he moved to Heriot's.

He has also played rugby in Dubai, Canada and Germany.

=== Professional career ===
He was signed for Edinburgh Rugby's academy system in 2006.

He moved to Glasgow Warriors academy system in 2007; one of twelve Glasgow academy players that season. He turned out for the Warriors in their pre-season game of 2007–08, against Leeds Carnegie. The Warriors won the match 19 - 6.

=== International career ===
Dymock played for Scotland at Under 19 grade.

While with Edinburgh academy he played for the Scotland U20 side against Glasgow Warriors on 13 November 2006 at Meggetland.

He also played for the Scotland U20 side in January 2007 against his own Edinburgh side.

He followed the Glasgow and Edinburgh matches with a match against England U20 at the Recreation Ground in Bath. England won 31 - 5.

Dymock played for Scotland Club XV at the international level. He last played for international side in 2012. 2013 was the first time in 5 years that no Dymock - either Alan or his brothers - made the Club XV side.

=== Journalism career ===
He studied journalism at Goldsmith College at the University of London, completing a master's degree.

He was a freelance writer for The Scotsman newspaper from 2012 to 2013.

Dymock joined the magazine Rugby World in 2013. He started as a features writer.

In February 2016 he was named Rugby Journalist of the Year at the British Sports Journalism Awards.

In November 2022, he became editor of Rugby World
