= Rory McKay =

Scottish rugby union player

- Born: Rory Andrew McKay; 9 February 1979 (age 47) Scotland
- Height: 1.96 m (6 ft 5 in)
- Weight: 102 kg (16 st 1 lb)
- School: Robert Gordon College

Rugby union career
- Position: Flanker
Amateur team(s)
| Years | Team | Apps | (Points) |
- Gordonians RFC
| 2001-02 | Glasgow Hawks | | |
| 2002-04 | Aberdeen GSFP RFC | | |
| 2004 | Manly | | |
- Venezia
- Waterloo
- Bedford Blues
| 2009 | Glasgow Hawks | | |
Senior career
| Years | Team | Apps | (Points) |
- Caledonia Reds
| 2002-04 | Glasgow Warriors | 19 | (10) |
International career
| Years | Team | Apps | (Points) |
- Scotland U19
| – | Scotland Club XV | | |
National sevens team
| Years | Team | | Comps |
- Scotland
Coaching career
- Years: Team
- 2014-: Perthshire RFC

Rory McKay (born 2 February 1979) is a Scottish former rugby union player and now coach who played for Glasgow Warriors. He played at flanker. He played at international level for the Scotland Sevens side.

Starting his amateur career at Gordonians RFC, McKay then moved to Glasgow Hawks. In 2002, he left the Hawks to sign for the professional provincial side Glasgow Warriors. While not playing for the provincial side, he played for Aberdeen Grammar.

McKay left Glasgow Warriors in 2004 and pursued a career in rugby in Australia, Italy and England. He played for Manly in Australia; Venezia in Italy; and Waterloo and Bedford Blues in England.

The flanker also represented Scotland in their Club XV side.

He represented an invitational Caledonia Reds side versus a Co-Optimists side in effort to get the Caledonia Reds side formally re-instated by the SRU in 2014.

He is now a rugby development officer and coach of Perthshire RFC.
