= Currie High School =

Coordinates: 55°53′46″N 3°19′7″W

Currie Community High School

Location
- 32 Dolphin Avenue; Edinburgh, EH14 5RD; Scotland

Information
- Motto: Labore et honore
- Established: 1966
- Local authority: City of Edinburgh Council
- Department for Education URN: 5540739 Tables
- Headteacher: Jennifer Hutchison
- Age: 11yrs to 18yrs
- Enrolment: 727
- Houses: Hermiston, Kinleith and Lennox
- Colours: Red, Blue and Green
- Website: http://curriehighschool.co.uk/

Currie Community High School is a six-year comprehensive school serving the south-west of the City of Edinburgh, Scotland. The school roll currently stands at 727 of whom 20% attend as a result of parental placing requests. The school's feeder primary schools are Currie Primary School, Nether Currie Primary School and Juniper Green Primary School. Several Labour Party politicians have made visits, including former First Minister Henry McLeish, also more recently First Minister Jack McConnell, Sarah Boyack and David Miliband. It has also been visited by William Hague and Malcolm Rifkind.

The school is a Community High School, offering classes, activities and events to the local community.

== History ==
The present building opened in 1966 and was extensively refurbished between 1996 – 1998. It was closed in August 2025 when a new building was opened and is now scheduled for demolition in Spring 2026.

The current building was built by Edinburgh Council at a cost of £65m. It was designed to Passivhaus standards and is considered a state-of-the-art facility.

== Notable alumni ==
- Stephen Carter, Baron Carter of Barnes
- Kate Green, Labour MP
- Kathleen Jamie, writer, poet. Professor at Stirling University.
- Lewis MacDougall, Actor
- Andrew Oldcorn, professional golfer
- Andrew Oswald, Professor of Economics, University of Warwick
- Peter Sawkins, Winner of The Great British Bake Off 2020
- Matt Scott, rugby player, multiple caps for Scotland
- Sue Webber, MSP for Lothian 2021-26

== Headteachers ==
- Mrs Jennifer Hutchison (2020–)
- Ms Doreen McKinnon (2014–2020)
- Ms Kate Paton (2007–2013)
- Dr Dorothy White (2005–2007)
- Mr Eric Melvin (1992–2005)
- Mr Ronald Paul (N/a - 1992)
