= Peter McCallum =

Scottish rugby union player

- Born: Peter Philip McCallum; 1992 (age 33–34) Ayr, Scotland
- Height: 1.86 m (6 ft 1 in)
- Weight: 137 kg (21 st 8 lb)

Rugby union career
- Position: Number Eight
Amateur team(s)
Years	Team	Apps	(Points)
2011-19	Ayr		
Senior career
Years	Team	Apps	(Points)
2016-17	Glasgow Warriors	5	(0)
Super Rugby
Years	Team	Apps	(Points)
2019-	Ayrshire Bulls	51	(65)
International career
Years	Team	Apps	(Points)
-	Scotland Club XV		

Peter McCallum (born 1992 in Ayr, Scotland) is a Scottish rugby union player who plays for Ayrshire Bulls as a Number Eight.

== Rugby Union career ==
=== Amateur career ===
McCallum has played for Ayr RFC since 2011 and is now the captain of the club. He has played for Ayr in the British and Irish Cup and the BT Premiership and against Scotland U20. He won BT Premiership Player of the season for 2015-16.

=== Professional career ===
McCallum played for Glasgow Warriors against Canada 'A' on 30 August 2016.

Since 2019 McCallum now captains and plays for Super 6 side Ayrshire Bulls.

=== International career ===
He has been called up for Scotland Club XV several times.

== Outside rugby ==
McCallum is a Director of Tumax Storage.
