= George Hunter (rugby union) =

Bahamas international rugby union player

- Born: George Hunter; 20 November 1991 (age 34) Stevenage, Hertfordshire, England
- Height: 6 ft 4 in (1.93 m)
- Weight: 113 kg (17 st 11 lb)
- School: Westhill Academy
- University: Strathclyde University

Rugby union career
- Position: Tighthead Prop
Amateur team(s)
Years	Team	Apps	(Points)
- Robert Gordon College
- Aberdeen Wanderers RFC
- Glasgow Hawks
2013-	Ayr RFC		
Senior career
Years	Team	Apps	(Points)
2012-16	Glasgow Warriors	3	(0)
2013-14	→ London Scottish	3	(0)
- Correct as of 20 June 2015
International career
Years	Team	Apps	(Points)
- Scotland U17
- Scotland U18
2009-11	Scotland U20	19	(0)
- Scotland Club XV
2016-	Bahamas	1	(0)

George Hunter (born 20 November 1991 in Stevenage) is an English born Bahamian rugby union player. He previously played for Glasgow Warriors at the Tighthead Prop position.

== Early life ==
He grew up in Aberdeen and was educated at Westhill Academy.

== Rugby career ==
=== Amateur career ===
He has represented Aberdeen Wanderers RFC and Glasgow Hawks and Ayr.

=== Professional career ===
Hunter was part of the Elite Development Programme attached to Glasgow Warriors.

He broke into the full Warriors squad in 2012. He played against the Ospreys and Leinster in the Pro12; and away to Castres Olympique in December 2012 in his European Champions Cup debut.

He joined London Scottish on loan for a short period at the end of the 2013–14 season before rejoining the Warriors and continuing to play for Ayr RFC.

On 17 July 2015 it was announced that Hunter had secured a short term professional contract with Glasgow Warriors to provide depth and competition for places during the 2015 World Cup when the Warriors will lose a host of their top stars on Scotland duty.

=== International career ===
==== Scotland ====
He has represented Scotland at Under 17, Under 18 and Under 20 level. He captained the Under 20 side throughout much of 2011. He played for the Scotland Club XV international side.

==== Bahamas ====
Although Hunter was eligible to play for Scotland, his grandfather was from the Bahamas. In 2016 Hunter represented the Bahamas at international level. He made his first appearance for the Bahamas in the 2016 Rugby Americas North Championship against Mexico.
