= Alex Allan (rugby union) =

Scotland international rugby union player

- Born: Alex Grant Allan; 28 February 1992 (age 34) Harrogate, England
- Height: 1.88 m (6 ft 2 in)
- Weight: 116 kg (18 st 4 lb; 256 lb)
- School: Sedbergh School
- University: Loughborough University

Rugby union career
- Position: Prop
Amateur team(s)
Years	Team	Apps	(Points)
- Harrogate RUFC
2010-2012	Loughborough Students RUFC		
2012–2015	Edinburgh Accies		
Senior career
Years	Team	Apps	(Points)
2011	Sale Sharks	1	(0)
2012–2014	Edinburgh	5	(0)
2014–21	Glasgow Warriors	109	(10)
- Correct as of 03 October 2014
International career
Years	Team	Apps	(Points)
- Scotland u17
- Scotland u18
2010–2012	Scotland u20	15	(0)
- Scotland Club XV
2014	Scotland A	1	(0)
2014–2021	Scotland	8	(0)
- Correct as of 16 November 2018
Coaching career
- Years: Team
- 2021-2025: Hong Kong Scottish (Director of Rugby)
- 2021-2025: Hong Kong (Forwards Coach)

Alex Grant Allan (born 28 February 1992) is a Scotland international rugby union player. He is now Head Coach at Hong Kong Scottish; and forwards coach for the Hong Kong international side. He previously played for Glasgow Warriors in the Pro14. He played primarily at loose head prop.

== Rugby Union career ==
=== Amateur career ===
Allan began his rugby with Harrogate Rugby Union Football Club and at Sedbergh School, before going to represent his University team. Aware of his Scottish roots he also played for the Scottish Exiles team. He transferred his university career to Edinburgh Napier after two years to join Edinburgh Academicals. He stayed with the amateur club as part of the pro-player draft to be available when not in use by his professional club. In 2016 and 2017, as part of the pro-player draft he was assigned to Currie for the seasons. In 2018, he was drafted to Ayr for the season.

In July 2021 he became a Coach at Hong Kong Scottish.

=== Professional career ===
The prop started his professional career with Sale Sharks before moving to Edinburgh Rugby.

On 30 April 2014, it was announced that Allan would leaving Edinburgh's development squad to sign a two-year professional contract with rivals Glasgow Warriors. He made his competitive Glasgow debut in a home win against Leinster on 6 September 2014, becoming Warrior No. 231. He was to stay with the Warriors for seven years; making 14 appearances in Glasgow's Pro12 title winning season in 2014–15; becoming a centurion on 14 December 2019 in the European Cup match against La Rochelle. He would leave the Warriors at the end of the 2020–21 season. He stated:

I am immensely proud to have represented Glasgow Warriors. There have been some incredible moments over the last seven years both on and off the pitch. I have been fortunate enough to be part of some incredible victories and I wish the team the best for the future.

=== International career ===
He has successfully moved through the Scottish age grades from under-17 to now represent the senior Scotland national team. He qualifies for Scotland through his grandfather.

=== Coaching career ===
From July 2021, Allan is now Director of Rugby at Hong Kong Scottish.

He combines coaching the Scottish exile side with being forwards coach for the Hong Kong international side.
