= James Malcolm (rugby union) =

Scottish rugby union player

- Born: James Thomas Malcolm; 23 September 1994 (age 32) Glasgow, Scotland
- Height: 6 ft 1 in (1.85 m)
- Weight: 106 kg (16 st 10 lb)
- School: Hutchesons' Grammar School
- University: University of Strathclyde
- Notable relative: Rachel Malcolm (sister)

Rugby union career
- Position: Hooker
Amateur team(s)
Years	Team	Apps	(Points)
2012-15	Glasgow Hutchesons Aloysians	26	(20)
2013–17	Ayr		
2017-18	Marr		
2018-19	Ayr		
Senior career
Years	Team	Apps	(Points)
2014-19	Glasgow Warriors	13	(10)
2018-19	→Doncaster Knights	10	(10)
2019-20	London Scottish	18	(20)
2020-21	Dallas Jackals		
2021-	Seattle Seawolves	40	(70)
- Correct as of 29 June 2015
Super Rugby
Years	Team	Apps	(Points)
2022-	Ayrshire Bulls	3	(0)
International career
Years	Team	Apps	(Points)
2012-14	Scotland U17		
2014	Scotland U18		
2018	Scotland U20	12	(0)
- Correct as of 29 June 2015

James Malcolm (born 23 September 1994 in Glasgow, Scotland) is a Scottish rugby union player who plays for the Seattle Seawolves of Major League Rugby (MLR).

He previously played for the Glasgow Warriors at the hooker or prop positions.

== Rugby Union career ==
=== Amateur career ===
Malcolm is a product of Glasgow Hutchesons' Aloysians RFC (GHA) and Hutchesons' Grammar School. He played 1st XV rugby for GHA during season 2012/13 and 2014/15.

Malcolm joined Ayr Rugby Club at the start of the 2013–14 season.

He is also part of the University of Strathclyde's Elite Athlete programme, which enables gifted sportsmen and women to balance training and competition with their academic courses, where he studies Mechanical Engineering.

Malcolm was drafted to Marr in the Scottish Premiership for the 2017-18 season.

Malcolm has been drafted to Ayr in the Scottish Premiership for the 2018-19 season.

=== Professional career ===
Malcolm secured an Elite Development Programme and was aligned to Glasgow Warriors for the 2014–15 season. This meant he could continue playing for Ayr RFC whilst training and challenging for a place at the Warriors.

He made his competitive debut for the Warriors on 7 November 2015 in a Pro12 match away to Cardiff Blues at Cardiff Arms Park. The Warriors won the match 35–30.

He graduated from the Scottish Rugby Academy and signed a professional contract with Glasgow Warriors on 23 March 2016.

He joined Doncaster Knights on loan on 7 September 2018.

He signed for Seattle Seawolves in 2021.

He plays for Ayrshire Bulls in the Super 6 in the Northern American off-season.

=== Representative career ===
In February 2018 Malcolm was called up to the senior Scotland squad for the 2018 Six Nations Championship.
