= Fraser Thomson (rugby union) =

- Born: Fraser Thomson; 18 May 1989 (age 37) Scotland
- Height: 6 ft 0 in (1.83 m)
- Weight: 89 kg (14 st 0 lb)

Rugby union career
- Position: Full Back
Amateur team(s)
| Years | Team | Apps | (Points) |
- Gala
| – | Melrose | | |
Senior career
| Years | Team | Apps | (Points) |
| 2011 | Sale Sharks | 0 | (0) |
| 2012-13 | Glasgow Warriors | 2 | (5) |
Super Rugby
| Years | Team | Apps | (Points) |
| 2019 | Southern Knights | 9 | (5) |
International career
| Years | Team | Apps | (Points) |
- Scotland Club XV
Coaching career
- Years: Team
- 2020-: Gala

Fraser Thomson (born 18 May 1989) is a former Scotland Club XV international rugby union player, previously with Glasgow Warriors, Southern Knights and Sale Sharks. He now coaches Gala.

== Rugby Union career ==
=== Amateur career ===
Thomson began playing rugby union for his home club Gala. He played for Gala for 3 seasons.

Thomson then played for Melrose. He spent 11 seasons at Melrose making 234 appearances and scoring 106 tries. With the club he won the Scottish Premiership 4 times, the Scottish Cup 2 times and also won the 2011 Melrose Sevens with the club.

=== Professional career ===
In 2011 he played for Sale Sharks but did not make the first team, instead scoring tries for their reserve side.

He secured an Elite Development place with Glasgow Warriors in 2012.

He played twice for the club in season 2012-13, scoring a try. He is Warrior Number 210.

He was vice-captain of the Super 6 side Southern Knights in season 2019-20; playing 9 times and scoring 1 try.

=== International career ===
He has been capped by Scotland Club XV and is currently the most capped player to date with 15 appearances. He captained the side in 2018.

=== Coaching career ===
On 30 July 2020 Thomson resigned from the Southern Knights to take up the position as Head Coach of Gala. Uncertainty in the timetabling of competitive rugby in the covid-19 pandemic is said to have influenced his decision to stop his playing career.

== Personal life ==
Thomson is married to A·Hume Country Clothing Managing Director Rachel Thomson, who won the Draper's Independent Rising Star Award in 2021. His Brother in law is a Professional footballer currently playing in Scotland.
