= Will Bordill =

Scottish rugby union player

- Born: William James Bordill; 24 May 1993 (age 33) Sandbach, England
- Height: 6 ft 0 in (1.83 m)
- Weight: 96 kg (15 st 2 lb)
- University: Manchester Metropolitan University

Rugby union career
- Position: Loose forward
Amateur team(s)
Years	Team	Apps	(Points)
- Preston Grasshoppers
–	Ayr RFC		
Senior career
Years	Team	Apps	(Points)
2011–2013	Sale Sharks	1	(0)
2013–2016	Glasgow Warriors	7	(5)
International career
Years	Team	Apps	(Points)
- Scotland U17
- Scotland U18
2011–2013	Scotland U20	19	(0)
–	Scotland Club XV		

William James Bordill (born 24 July 1993 in Sandbach) is a Scottish rugby union player who plays for the Ayr RFC at the loose forward position. He formerly played for Glasgow Warriors. Bordill played for Glasgow Warriors from 2013 to 2016. When not involved with the Warriors, he played for Ayr RFC.

He has represented Scotland at various age grades and at Club XV.

In 2016, he was released by the Warriors and now solely plays for Ayr.
