= Fergus Scott =

Scottish rugby union player

- Born: Fergus Scott; 1 August 1992 (age 34) Scotland
- Height: 6 ft 0 in (1.83 m)
- Weight: 98 kg (15 st 6 lb)
- Notable relative: Matt Scott (brother)

Rugby union career
- Position: Hooker
Amateur team(s)
Years	Team	Apps	(Points)
- Currie RFC
- Ayr RFC
2016-	Currie		
Senior career
Years	Team	Apps	(Points)
2013–16	Glasgow Warriors	3	(0)
- Correct as of 23 June 2015
International career
Years	Team	Apps	(Points)
- Scotland Club XV
–	Scotland U20		
–	Scotland U18		
–	Scotland U17		
- Correct as of 20 June 2015

Fergus Scott (born 1 August 1992 in Scotland) is a Scotland Club XV international rugby union player who plays for Currie Chieftains at the Hooker position.

Scott has represented Scotland at under-17, under-18 and under-20 level. He has captained the Scotland under-20 side and has been called up to the Scotland Club XV side.

He has played for Currie RFC and Ayr RFC and is also a coach at Glasgow University Rugby Football Club.

Scott signed for the Glasgow Warriors in 2012 as part of their Elite Development Programme. The hooker is the younger brother of Edinburgh Rugby centre Matt Scott.

Fergus was voted first XV Young Player of the Year at the end of season awards for 2013–14 for Ayr RFC.

On 11 March 2015 it was announced that Scott signed a full professional contract to Glasgow Warriors till May 2016.

He was released in 2016 and now plays for Currie.
