= Scott Wight =

Scottish rugby union player

- Born: Scott Wight; 5 November 1985 (age 41)
- Height: 1.91 m (6 ft 3 in)
- Weight: 92 kg (14 st 7 lb)

Rugby union career
- Position: Stand-off (fly-half)
Amateur team(s)
Years	Team	Apps	(Points)
–2011	Melrose		
Senior career
Years	Team	Apps	(Points)
2011–2014	Glasgow Warriors	26	(75)
2015	Glasgow Warriors	2	(0)
- Correct as of 19 May 2013
International career
Years	Team	Apps	(Points)
- Scotland Club XV
National sevens team
Years	Team		Comps
2013–	Scotland 7s		5

Scott Wight (born 5 November 1985) is a Scottish rugby union player. His regular playing position is stand-off. He played for Glasgow Warriors in the PRO12 having previously represented Melrose.

== Club career ==
Scott started off playing for Melrose RFC playing at 10. During his time at Melrose, Wight captained the Greenyards team to a magnificent haul of Premier 1, Border League and Melrose Sevens titles, and also guided them to the final of the Scottish Cup. He also represented the Scotland Club XV International team.

In 2011, Scott signed with Glasgow Warriors. Since his time there, he has been the third choice stand off behind internationalists Duncan Weir and Ruaridh Jackson. During the 2012 season, he has been a strong contender with Jackson to start with Weir being injured. In May 2013, Wight signed a new one-year contract, saying "I've only ever wanted to stay in Glasgow and I'm very happy to have signed this new deal".

Wight left Glasgow at the end of the 2013–14 season.

He joined the Warriors side again on 25 August 2015, this time on loan from Scotland 7s. This was to provide cover at fly-half throughout the Rugby World Cup period with the injury to Gregor Hunter.

=== Coaching ===
While still an active player, Wight took a step into coaching in April 2017 when he was appointed as coach of the Scotland Women 7s squad, replacing Scott Forrest in the role.
