= Andy Redmayne =

Scottish rugby union player

- Born: Andy Redmayne; 26 June 1992 (age 34) Glasgow, Scotland
- Height: 6 ft 5 in (1.96 m)
- Weight: 104 kg (16 st 5 lb)
- School: Loudoun Academy

Rugby union career
- Position: Lock / Flanker
Amateur team(s)
Years	Team	Apps	(Points)
- Dundee HSFP
–	Glasgow Hawks		
International career
Years	Team	Apps	(Points)
- Scotland U18
2011-12	Scotland U20	10	(10)
–	Scotland Club XV		
- Correct as of 4 July 2015

Andy Redmayne (born 26 June 1992 in Glasgow, Scotland) is a Scotland Club XV international rugby union player at the Lock position. He can also play Flanker.

== Rugby Union career ==
=== Amateur career ===
Completing a degree in English at University in Dundee, Redmayne played for the Dundee High School Former Pupils Rugby Club; Dundee HSFP.

=== Professional career ===
Redmayne secured an Elite Development Programme position at the Glasgow Warriors in 2013 and 2014 This meant he could continue playing for Glasgow Hawks whilst training and challenging for a place at the Warriors.

He played for Glasgow Warriors in their 2013-14 pre-season friendly against Aberdeen GSFP RFC.

=== International career ===
Redmayne was to be capped by Scotland for the under 18s and capped by the under 20s. He scored a try for the Under 20s against Australia in the 2012 Junior World Championships in Cape Town.

Redmayne was capped by the Scotland Club XV side in 2013.
