= Pete Wilkins =

English rugby union coach (born 1979)

Peter Wilkins (born 5 September 1979) is an English rugby union Assistant coach of Italian United Rugby Championship Benetton Rugby. He is the former Head Coach of Irish provincial team Connacht Rugby, having announced his resignation in April. He was previously Senior Coach and Attack Coach at Connacht Rugby in the Guinness Pro14, Assistant Coach of Edinburgh Rugby, also in the Guinness Pro14, and Assistant Coach of the Queensland Reds in the Super Rugby competition. Prior to this, he held roles as Head Performance Analyst of the Queensland Reds, Head Coach of Queensland Reds A, and Coaching Coordinator of Queensland Country in the Australian National Rugby Championship.

== Early life ==
Born in London, Wilkins grew up in the Hampshire city of Winchester, attending Christ's Hospital School as a boarder and captaining the school's rugby and cricket teams, as well as Sussex Schools Rugby representative age grades. In 1997, he relocated to Australia to play colts rugby for Eastern Suburbs RUFC, before returning to the UK to study Geography at Durham University.

== Community rugby ==
In 2007, Wilkins returned to Australia to work for the Queensland Rugby Union as their Regional Rugby Manager for North Queensland and Central Queensland, where he oversaw rugby development and coach education across the region's rugby communities. This role later expanded to include the areas of South East Queensland outside of Brisbane. Wilkins progressed to the role of Head of Coach Education for the Queensland Rugby Union, overseeing and delivering coach accreditation courses across the state. During this time he also gained coaching experience at the community level with North Ward Old Boys Rugby Union Club in the Townsville and Districts Rugby Union competition, and Easts Tigers Rugby Union and GPS Rugby in Queensland Premier Rugby. Wilkins has maintained his links to the community game and is regularly involved in providing ongoing education for grassroots coaches and players.

== Professional coaching career ==
=== 2011-2015 ===
In 2011, Wilkins joined the Queensland Reds high performance department as a Performance Analyst, the same year the team won the Super 15 Final. He was promoted to Head of Performance Analysis later that year, before becoming Skills Coach in 2013, and Defence Coach in 2015. During this time, Wilkins was also Head Coach of the Reds Wider Training Squad, Coaching Coordinator of Queensland Country in 2014's inaugural Australian National Rugby Championship, and Head Coach of the Queensland Reds A team for three seasons. Leading Queensland Reds A in the Pacific Rugby Cup, now known as the World Rugby Pacific Challenge, the team enjoyed unbeaten seasons in 2013 and 2015, and were beaten finalists in 2014 against Argentina A.

=== 2015-2017 ===
At the conclusion of the 2015 Super Rugby season, Wilkins accepted the role of Assistant Coach with Edinburgh Rugby in the Guinness Pro12 competition, arriving on a one-year contract and later that season renewing for another two years on the back of significant improvements in Edinburgh's defence. When Head Coach Alan Solomons departed his role during the 2016–17 Pro12 season, Wilkins remained to coach the team along with interim Head Coach Duncan Hodge, and Forwards Coach Stevie Scott.

=== 2017-2022 ===
Wilkins joined Connacht Rugby as Assistant Coach for the start of the 2017–18 Pro14 season, arriving on a two-year contract to work under newly appointed Head Coach Kieran Keane. When Keane left the club at the end of his first season, Wilkins remained to continue his role under new Head Coach Andy Friend. During the 2018–19 Pro14 season, Wilkins extended his contract for another two seasons with Connacht. In April 2021, Wilkins was promoted to the role of Senior Coach with Connacht Rugby, with primary responsibility for the team's attack. He has described his attack coaching philosophy as favouring an unstructured style of play based on key attacking principles, and the importance of building an emotional connection to the team's style of play.

=== 2022-2025 ===
In June 2022, Ireland Head Coach Andy Farrell announced the inclusion of Wilkins as an Assistant Coach for Ireland's summer tour to New Zealand, including a three test series against the All Blacks and two mid-week games against New Zealand Maori. On his return from Ireland's series win, Wilkins was promoted to the position of Connacht Head Coach, with Andy Friend moving to a new Director of Rugby role. When Friend later announced he would be leaving Connacht at the conclusion of the 2022-23 season, it was confirmed that Wilkins would assume overall responsibility for the professional team, signing a three-year contract as Head Coach. He would combine this new role with a return to coaching the team's attack. On 16 April 2025, he resigned from his position as head coach of Connacht with immediate effect.
