= Tommy Spinks (rugby union) =

Scottish rugby union player

- Born: Tommy Spinks; 22 April 1994 (age 32) Edinburgh, Scotland
- Height: 6 ft 3 in (1.91 m)
- Weight: 107 kg (16 st 12 lb)
- School: North Berwick High School

Rugby union career
- Position: Flanker / Lock
Amateur team(s)
Years	Team	Apps	(Points)
2014–2015	Glasgow Hawks		
2016-	Glasgow Hawks		
Senior career
Years	Team	Apps	(Points)
2012–2014	London Scottish	9	
2014–2015	Glasgow Warriors	2	
2014–2015	→Ospreys	2	
2015–16	Jersey Reds	11	
International career
Years	Team	Apps	(Points)
- Scotland Club XV
–	Scotland U20		
–	Scotland U18		
Coaching career
- Years: Team
- 2019-: Glasgow Academicals (Asst.)

Tommy Spinks (born 22 April 1994 in Edinburgh, Scotland) is a Scottish rugby union player who plays for Glasgow Hawks at the Flanker or Lock positions. Spinks states his preferred position is openside flanker.

== Rugby Union career ==
=== Amateur career ===
Spinks started playing mini rugby when he was 5 years old. By his fourth year of high school at North Berwick he played for the 1st XV. The rugby coach at Fettes College got Spinks a scholarship there.

In June 2014 it was announced that Spinks would join Glasgow Warriors as part of their Elite Development Programme. As part of his deal Spinks was able to play for Glasgow Hawks when not involved with the Warriors.

After a stint in Jersey he re-joined the Hawks in 2016.

=== Professional career ===
The back-row forward was to sign for London Scottish straight from Fettes College.

During the 2014–15 season he was loaned out to the Ospreys. and played twice in the LV Cup.

He played twice for Glasgow Warriors in the Pro12 league in their championship winning season; both appearances as substitute. On 28 February 2015 he made his debut for Glasgow Warriors away to Munster at Thormond Park. He also appeared in the 6 March 2015 home match at Scotsoun against Italian side Zebre. He was also part of the Warriors 7s squad that successfully defended the 2015 Melrose Sevens.

On 28 May 2015 it was announced that Tommy Spinks would sign for Jersey Rugby Club.

He left Jersey to re-join Glasgow Hawks in July 2016.

=== International career ===
Spinks has played for the Scotland under 18s, under 20s and ClubXVs. He captained the under-20 national side at the Under-20 Rugby World Cup in 2014.

=== Coaching career ===
Spinks has agreed to a player-coach deal at Glasgow Academicals for season 2019–20.
