= Nyle Godsmark =

Scottish rugby union player

- Born: Nyle James Godsmark; 10 April 1992 (age 34) Rutherglen, Scotland
- Height: 6 ft 1 in (1.85 m)
- Weight: 97 kg (15 st 4 lb)

Rugby union career
- Position: Wing
Amateur team(s)
Years	Team	Apps	(Points)
- Edinburgh Academicals
Senior career
Years	Team	Apps	(Points)
2015	Glasgow Warriors	0	(0)
International career
Years	Team	Apps	(Points)
2014	Scotland Club XV		
National sevens team
Years	Team		Comps
2014-	Scotland 7s		9 (5 pts)

Nyle Godsmark (born 10 April 1992 in Rutherglen) is a Scottish rugby union player who plays for the Scotland 7s on the World Rugby Sevens Series.

A Scotland 7s international, he previously joined the then Pro12 champions Glasgow Warriors on a short-term deal to provide cover for the Rugby World Cup.

He previously played for amateur side Edinburgh Academicals.
