= Jason Hill (rugby union) =

Scottish rugby union player

- Born: Jason Hill; 12 March 1990 (age 36) Hereford, England

Rugby union career
- Position: Flanker / Number Eight
Amateur team(s)
Years	Team	Apps	(Points)
- Stirling County
2014-16	Heriots		
2019	Hamilton Hawks		
Senior career
Years	Team	Apps	(Points)
2015-16	Glasgow Warriors	0	(0)
2016-17	Bedford Blues		
2017-	Doncaster Knights		
Super Rugby
Years	Team	Apps	(Points)
2019	Heriot's Rugby	1	(0)
International career
Years	Team	Apps	(Points)
- Scotland U18
- Scotland U20
2013-16	Scotland Club XV	5	

Jason Hill (born in Hereford, England) is an English born Scottish Club XV international rugby union player who plays for Heriot's Rugby at the Flanker or Number Eight positions. He previously played for Glasgow Warriors, Stirling County, Heriots and Bedford Blues.

== Rugby Union career ==
=== Amateur career ===
He played for Stirling County and most recently Heriots before securing a professional contract.

The 2014–15 season was a triumph for Hill as he won the BT Premiership Player of the Season and the award for try of the season, the Brigadier Frank Coutts Memorial award. Hill also secured Heriot's BT Premiership title with a last minute try over Melrose in the play-off final at Goldenacre.

In 2019 Jason ventured down under to play a season in Australia, playing in Newcastle's NHRU competition with the four time reigning premiers - Hamilton Hawks. Jason started in the 2019 NHRU Grand Final helping Hamilton secure their fifth straight premiership by beating Wanderers 36-7 and was awarded the John Hipwell Medal for the 'Man of the Match'.

=== Professional career ===
Jason Hill signed for the Glasgow Warriors in 2015–16 after training with the Pro12 club from February to the end of the 2014–15 season.

The one-year partnership contract signed allows Hill to play for Heriots when not playing for the Glasgow Warriors.

He is contracted to Glasgow Warriors until 2016. He made his debut for Glasgow Warriors in the pre-season friendly against Clermont. He then played in Warriors pre-season international friendly against Canada and their early season friendly against the British Army rugby union team.

On 13 May 2016 Hill signed for Bedford Blues in the RFU Championship.

It was announced on 16 May 2017 that Hill would sign for Doncaster Knights for the 2017–18 season.

Hill now plays for the Super 6 side Heriot's Rugby.

=== International career ===
Hill has represented Scotland at Under 18 and Under 20 level, and at Club XV level.

Called up for the Scotland Club XV international side which is made up of the best club players in the country, Hill was to score a vital try in the win over Ireland Club XV at Melrose. He was awarded the man of the match for his performance.
