= Steven Findlay =

Scottish rugby union player

- Born: Steven Findlay; 22 September 1986 (age 40) Motherwell, Scotland
- Height: 6 ft 0 in (1.83 m)
- Weight: 110 kg (17 st 5 lb)

Rugby union career
- Position: Loosehead Prop
Amateur team(s)
Years	Team	Apps	(Points)
2004–2011	Dalziel	93	(40)
2011–16	Glasgow Hawks		
2016	Eastern Suburbs		
2016-	Glasgow Hawks		
Senior career
Years	Team	Apps	(Points)
2015-16	Glasgow Warriors	0	(0)
- Correct as of 17 July 2015
International career
Years	Team	Apps	(Points)
- Scotland Club XV

Steven Findlay (born 22 September 1986, in Motherwell, Scotland) is a Scotland Club XV international rugby union player who plays for Glasgow Hawks at the Loosehead Prop position. In the 2015-16 season he had a short term professional deal with Glasgow Warriors. He previously played for Dalziel Rugby Club and Eastern Suburbs in Australia.

== Amateur career ==
Findlay started playing amateur rugby with Dalziel Rugby Club in 2004. He played with them until 2011 appearing 97 times for the 1st XV and scoring 45 points (nine tries).

Moving to the Glasgow Hawks for the season 2011–12, Findlay made 22 appearances for the club in season 2014–15.

The Glasgow Warriors professional contract in 2015 allowed Findlay to play at Glasgow Hawks when not involved with the Warriors team.

On 30 March 2016 it was announced that Findlay would move to New South Wales, Australia to play for Eastern Suburbs for a season playing in the Shute Shield.

After the Australian rugby season finished, Findlay returned to play for Glasgow Hawks.

== Professional career ==
He was called up to the Glasgow Warriors 'A' squad for a derby match against an Edinburgh 'A' side in September 2014.

On 17 July 2015 it was announced that Findlay had secured a short term professional contract with Glasgow Warriors to provide depth and competition for places during the 2015 World Cup when the Warriors will lose a host of their top stars on Scotland duty.

== International career ==
Findlay has been called up for the Scotland ClubXV squad.
