= Glenn Bryce =

Scottish rugby union player

- Born: Glenn Byrce; 7 June 1991 (age 35) Alloa, Scotland
- Height: 1.88 m (6 ft 2 in)
- Weight: 95.7 kg (15 st 1 lb)
- Notable relative: Kevin Bryce (brother)

Rugby union career
- Position: Fullback
Amateur team(s)
Years	Team	Apps	(Points)
- Alloa RFC
–	Stirling County		
–	Heriots		
2025-	Stirling County		
Senior career
Years	Team	Apps	(Points)
2012–13	Jersey Reds	14	(15)
2013–14	Doncaster Knights		
2014-16	Glasgow Warriors	16	(20)
2016-18	Edinburgh	33	(10)
2018-20	Glasgow Warriors	17	(15)
2020–21	LA Giltinis	12	(5)
Provincial / State sides
Years	Team	Apps	(Points)
2025-	Caledonia Reds		
Super Rugby
Years	Team	Apps	(Points)
2022-23	Stirling Wolves		
International career
Years	Team	Apps	(Points)
2010–11	Scotland U20	10	(0)
2026	Scotland Club XV	1	(0)
National sevens team
Years	Team		Comps
2015–18	Scotland		19

Glenn Bryce (born 7 June 1991 in Alloa) is a Scottish international 7s rugby union player who plays for Stirling County at club level. He is also the current captain of the district side Caledonia Reds. He previously played professionally for Glasgow Warriors, Edinburgh, Jersey Reds, Doncaster Knights, Stirling Wolves and the LA Giltinis of Major League Rugby (MLR) in the United States.

== Rugby Union career ==
=== Amateur career ===
Bryce was first playing youth rugby as a colt at Stirling County.

Byrce played with Alloa RFC.

He moved to play for Heriots. His performances for Heriots resulted in a call up to the Scotland U20s.

Bryce left the United States to head home to Scotland, where he now plays for Stirling County, alongside his nephew.

=== Professional and provincial career ===
Bryce spent two seasons with the Jersey Reds helping them gain promotion to the RFU Championship in 2012 and remained in the league in 2013.

He left Jersey in the summer of 2013 to play for the Doncaster Knights. The Knights also secured promotion to the RFU Championship in 2014.

Bryce left the Knights that summer joining the Glasgow Warriors as part of their Elite Development Programme.

In the 2014–15 season, he helped the Warriors secure a vital draw away to Leinster in the Guinness Pro12 after a healthy half time lead was squandered in the second half.

It was announced in March 2015 that Bryce would secure a professional contract with the Glasgow Warriors for the season 2015–16 graduating from their academy programme.

He had a two year spell at Edinburgh signing for them in 2016.

Bryce re-signed with old club Glasgow Warriors back in the Pro14 competition for the 2018–19 season. He extended his contract with the club from the 2019–20 season.

On 31 December 2020, Bryce left Glasgow to travel to the United States to sign with the LA Giltinis in the Major League Rugby competition.

He played for Stirling Wolves in the Super 6 competition winning the 2023 Super Series Championship.

In 2025-26 season he was appointed captain of the now amateur provincial Caledonia Reds side to play in the Amateur Scottish Inter-District Championship.

=== International career ===
Called up to the Scotland U20 side in 2010, he played for Scotland U20s again in 2011, playing in all of Scotland's five matches of the junior world cup.

In 2016 Bryce joined the Scotland Sevens setup, helping the side to back-to-back titles at the London leg of the World Sevens Series in 2016 and 2017. A place at the 2018 Commonwealth Games on Australia's Gold Coast followed, as Scotland earned a sixth-place finish.

He played for Scotland Club XV on 13 February 2026 against Ireland Club XV in Dublin.

== Family ==
He is the brother of Scottish rugby union internationalist Kevin Bryce.

His father Jock Bryce was a former prop for Heriots.

His nephew Layton Bryce - son of his brother Kevin - plays for Stirling County; meaning that Glenn and Kevin regularly play together for the club.
