= Gordon Reid (rugby union) =

Scotland international rugby union player

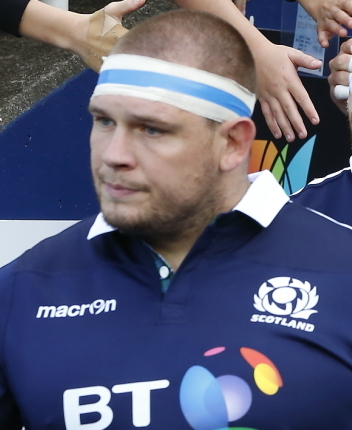
- Reid in 2017
- Born: Gordon Reid; 4 March 1987 (age 39) Irvine, Scotland
- Height: 1.88 m (6 ft 2 in)
- Weight: 120 kg (18 st 13 lb; 265 lb)

Rugby union career
- Position: Loosehead Prop
Amateur team(s)
Years	Team	Apps	(Points)
- Ayr
2021-	Marr		
Senior career
Years	Team	Apps	(Points)
2010–17	Glasgow Warriors	113	(35)
2017-19	London Irish	25	(0)
2019-20	Glasgow Warriors	0	(0)
2020	Northampton Saints	0	(0)
Super Rugby
Years	Team	Apps	(Points)
2019-20	Ayrshire Bulls	3	(0)
International career
Years	Team	Apps	(Points)
2009-11	Scotland Club XV	6	(0)
2014–	Scotland	41	(5)
- Correct as of 18 November 2021

Gordon Reid (born 4 March 1987) is a Scottish international Rugby union player. He plays as a loosehead prop. He now plays for Marr. He previously played for English Premiership sides London Irish and Northampton Saints, the Pro14 side Glasgow Warriors and the Super 6 side Ayrshire Bulls.

== Rugby Union career ==
=== Amateur career ===
Reid played for Ayr.

In 2021 Reid joined Marr. He scored a try on his debut on 4 September 2021.

=== Professional career ===
Reid has played over 100 times for the Glasgow Warriors.

After 7 years at Glasgow Warriors Reid departed the club when his contract expired in the summer of 2017.

On 1 June 2017 it was announced he had signed for newly promoted London Irish in the English Premiership.

For the start of the 2019–20 season it was announced that Reid would join the Super 6 side, the Ayrshire Bulls.

On 29 November 2019 it was announced that in addition to playing for the Ayrshire Bulls, Reid would once again join Glasgow Warriors in a partnership contract between the Pro14 and Super 6 side.

On 11 March 2020 it was announced that Reid had signed for Northampton Saints. Saints' scrum coach Matt Ferguson said the capture of Reid was 'top of the shopping list'. He departed the club in June 2020 having not been able to play due to the COVID-19 pandemic. In November 2021 he joined Wasps RFC on a short-term contract.

=== International career ===
Reid was called into the Scotland squad for the first time during the 2012 end-of-year rugby union tests and made an appearance on the substitute's bench against Tonga on 24 November, however he did not make it onto the field for his international debut. Reid made his Scotland debut v USA on the 2014 tour, and was a member of the Scotland Squad at the 2015 Rugby World Cup. He scored his first try for Scotland in the Calcutta Cup game of the 2017 Six Nations Championship.

== Outside of rugby ==
Reid made the headlines on 24 November 2019 when after investigating a burning smell – which he initially thought may have been his tumble dryer – he ran into a neighbour's house and saved a man from a burning building.
