= Gary Strain =

Scottish rugby union player

- Born: Gary Strain; 19 April 1988 (age 38) Motherwell, Scotland
- Height: 5 ft 11 in (1.80 m)
- School: Dalziel High School
- University: Strathclyde University

Rugby union career
- Position: Loosehead Prop
Amateur team(s)
Years	Team	Apps	(Points)
2004-07	Dalziel	36	(25)
2007-11, 2014-present	Glasgow Hawks		
Senior career
Years	Team	Apps	(Points)
2008	Glasgow Warriors		
2011-13	Massy	50	(5)
2013-14	Newcastle Falcons	12	(0)
2015, 2017	Glasgow Warriors		
- Correct as of 17 July 2015
International career
Years	Team	Apps	(Points)
- Scotland U18
- Scotland U19
- Scotland U20
2017	Scotland Club XV		
- Correct as of 17 July 2015
Coaching career
- Years: Team
- 2014-present: Glasgow Hawks (development officer)

Gary Strain (born 19 April 1988 in Motherwell, Scotland) is a Scottish rugby union player at the loosehead prop position.. He previously played for Glasgow Warriors and Newcastle Falcons.

== Rugby Union career ==
=== Amateur career ===
Strain started playing amateur rugby with Dalziel Rugby Club in 2004. He played with them until 2007 appearing 36 times and scoring 25 points (5 tries).

Moving to the Glasgow Hawks for the season 2007-08, Strain won the Scottish Shield with them in 2009. He played for the Hawks for four years before moving to the French side Massy.

=== Professional career ===
At the start of the 2008-09 season, he was called up to the Glasgow Warriors squad for a pre-season game against Bristol Rugby on 22 August 2008 and came on as a substitute in the match.

Massy was initially playing in the Fédérale 1 league in France, its highest amateur league. In 2012, it secured promotion to the French second-tier professional league, the Pro D2, for the first time.

Strain was then picked up by the Newcastle Falcons in 2013. and played 12 times for them in the 2013-14 season.

Returning to Scotland, Strain had a one-month training contract with Glasgow Warriors and represented a Warriors 'A' side against an Edinburgh 'A' side at Stirling.

On 17 July 2015, it was announced that he had secured a short-term professional contract with Glasgow Warriors to provide depth and competition for places during the 2015 World Cup when the Warriors would lose a number of their top stars on Scotland duty. The contract allowed Strain to play and coach at Glasgow Hawks when not involved with the Warriors team.

After a break, Strain was again picked for Glasgow Warriors for the 2017-18 friendly match against Dragons at Ebbw Vale.

=== International career ===
Strain was capped by the international squad for the under 18s, under 19s and under 20s for Scotland. He went on to be capped for Scotland Club XV.

=== Coaching career ===
He moved back to Glasgow Hawks in a player/development role and became the Hawks' club development officer in November 2014. In this role, he promoted rugby in various schools including Glasgow Academy, High School of Glasgow, Kelvinside Academy, Drumchapel High School, Saint Thomas Aquinas Secondary and Knightswood Secondary.
