= Scotland national under-19 rugby union team =

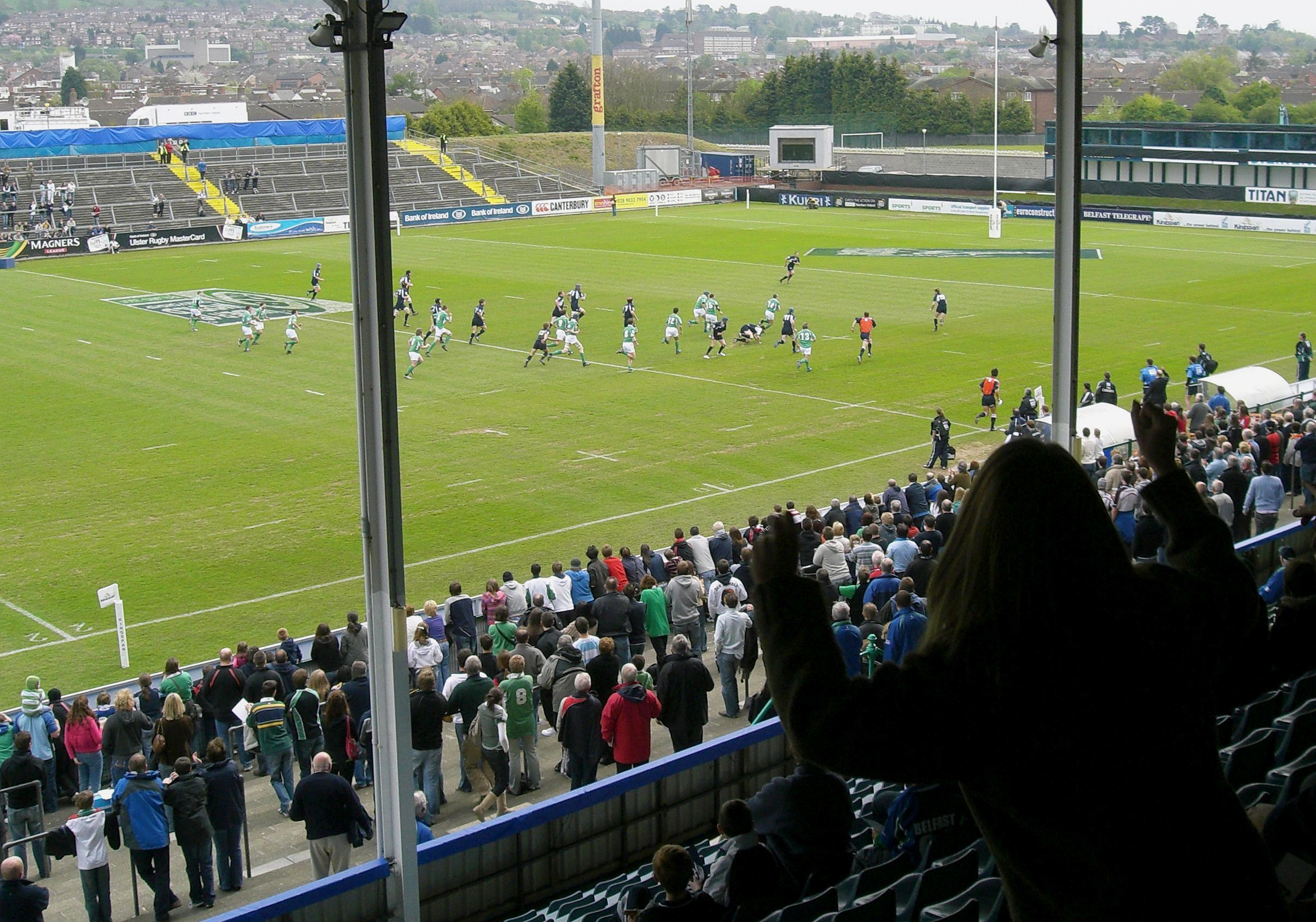
Scotland U-19 playing Ireland U-19 in the 2007 Under 19 Rugby World Championship at Ravenhill Stadium in Belfast

The Scotland national under-19 rugby union team is one of several junior national rugby union teams behind the Scottish national side. Starting in 2008, the International Rugby Board scrapped its under-21 and under-19 world championships in favour of a single under-20 competition, the IRB Junior World Championship. Scotland accordingly replaced its under-21 and under-19 sides with a new under-20 side.

The Under 19s regularly played until 2010 before being scrapped. The age grade is still very occasionally used by Scotland. In July 2014, the Under 18 boss Eddie Pollock named an Under 19 squad for a double header in August 2014 against Romanian age grades. The Scotland Under 19 side played the Romania Under 19 and Romania Under 20 sides.

== Squad ==
The squad for the 2007 Under 19 Rugby World Championship

Forwards

- Josh Brown (Bristol/Stilton Colts)
- Kevin Bryce (Glasgow Warriors)
- Steven Burton (Currie)
- Craig Charters (Hawick PSA)
- Angus Dixon (Aberdeen GSFP)
- Adrian Duncan (Stewart's Melville FP)
- Ralph McAnally (Perthshire)
- Fraser McKenzie (Edinburgh Rugby)
- Lewis Niven (Edinburgh Academicals)
- Neale Patrick (Dunfermline)
- Craig Simmonds (Dalziel)
- Joe Stafford (Glasgow Warriors)
- Gary Strain (Dalziel)
- Alexandre Wukovits (Begles Bordeaux)

Backs

- Murray Allan (Stewart's Melville FP)
- Ruairidh Bonner (Edinburgh Academicals)
- Tom Bury (Edinburgh Academicals)
- Harry Duthie (Harrogate)
- Ruairidh Jackson (Glasgow Warriors)
- Lee Jones (Selkirk)
- Chris Kinloch (Edinburgh Academicals)
- Stephen McColl (Dunfermline)
- James Murray (Edinburgh Academicals)
- Matthew Roxburgh-Heeks (London Scottish)
- Ross Samson (Tynedale)
- Johnnie Smart (Dunfermline)

== See also ==
=== Men's National teams ===
==== Senior ====
- Scotland national rugby union team
- Scotland A national rugby union team
- Scotland national rugby sevens team

==== Development ====
- Emerging Scotland
- Scotland B national rugby union team
- Scotland Club XV

==== Age Grades ====
- Scotland national under-21 rugby union team
- Scotland national under-20 rugby union team
- Scotland national under-19 rugby union team
- Scotland national under-18 rugby union team
- Scotland national under-17 rugby union team
- Scotland national under-16 rugby union team

=== Women's National teams ===
==== Senior ====
- Scotland women's national rugby union team
- Scotland women's national rugby union team (sevens)
