= Matt Scott (rugby union) =

Scotland international rugby union player

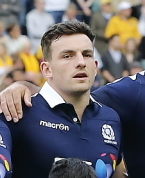
- Scott in 2017
- Born: Matthew Clive McCrimmon Scott; 30 September 1990 (age 36) Dunfermline, Scotland
- Height: 185 cm (6 ft 1 in)
- Weight: 103 kg (16 st 3 lb)
- School: Currie High School
- University: Edinburgh University
- Notable relative: Fergus Scott (brother)

Rugby union career
- Position: Centre
Youth career
- -: Currie RFC
Amateur team(s)
Years	Team	Apps	(Points)
2008–2013	Currie RFC	62	
2025	Currie Chieftains	1	
Senior career
Years	Team	Apps	(Points)
2011–2016	Edinburgh	74	(70)
2016–2018	Gloucester	35	(85)
2018–2020	Edinburgh	20	(20)
2020–2024	Leicester Tigers	80	(80)
2024–25	Edinburgh	6	(0)
- Correct as of 18 May 2024
International career
Years	Team	Apps	(Points)
2010	Scotland U20	9	(0)
2011	Scotland Club XV		
2012	Scotland A		
2012–2021	Scotland	40	(25)
- Correct as of 19 June 2017

Matthew Scott (born 30 September 1990) is a Scottish rugby union player with 40 caps for Scotland who most recently played for Edinburgh in the United Rugby Championship. His regular playing position is Centre.

== Early life ==
Scott was born in Dunfermline, Scotland. He was deputy head boy at Currie High School. In 2008 he embarked on full-time study at the University of Edinburgh while developing as a rugby player. He graduated with a law degree in 2013.

Scott had impressed in the 2010–11 season as a Scotland age-grade internationalist and his part in Currie's recent rise to prominence, domestically in Premier 1 and the British and Irish Cup. Before signing, Scott represented Scotland at under-19 and under-20 in 2009 and 2010 respectively.

Scott played for Edinburgh's district interstate u-17 and u-18 teams.

== Club career ==
In April 2011 Scott joined Edinburgh as an elite development player.

Scott made his competitive début on 2 September 2011 against Cardiff Blues. His first try came against 2010–11 Celtic League winners Munster after he dummied and cut inside, before palming off two Munster defenders to score under the posts.

By the middle of January 2016 he had played 70 times for Edinburgh and had scored 14 tries. On 16 January 2016, an announcement that Scott had signed for Aviva Premiership side Gloucester, to join for the start of the 2016–17 season. His last match for Edinburgh was against the Cardiff Blues on 7 May 2016.

On 21 February 2018, Scott re-signed with his hometown club Edinburgh back in the Pro14, on a two-year deal ahead of the 2018–19 season .

On 29 April 2020 it was confirmed Scott will join English side Leicester Tigers from the 2020–21 season. Scott played as a replacement in the 2022 Premiership Rugby final as Tigers beat Saracens 15–12. On 13 January 2023, Scott scored two tries as Leicester beat ASM Clermont Auvergne 44–29 away to qualify for the 2022–23 European Rugby Champions Cup round-of-16.

On 12 April 2024 Leicester announced that Scott would be leaving the club at the end of the season.

On 2 August 2024, it was confirmed that Scott returns to his old club Edinburgh for a third spell in his career for the 2024-25 season. Scott played 6 games for the club in this time due to an ongoing neck injury. He made his 100th and final appearance for Edinburgh on 26th October 2024 away to Ospreys.

In February 2025, Scott and his boyhood club Currie Chieftains announced on social media that he would make a special one-off appearance against Wastonians after 12 years since his last match with the club.

Matt announced his retirement from professional rugby on 13 May 2025.

== International career ==
Before going pro, Scott represented Scotland at under-19 and under-20 in 2009 and 2010 respectively.

Scott made his age-grade international debut in the 55–13 success against Italy at Lasswade, Edinburgh, in March 2009, followed by the Dourdan match against France a month later. In 2010 he was recalled to the representative set-up for Scotland's under-20 6 Nations, playing in all but one match, featuring as a replacement in each of the four 6NC matches before playing in a further five Junior world Championship matches in Argentina.

Scott made a try-scoring debut for Scotland A in February 2012 in the 35–0 win over England Saxons at Netherdale. The following month he gained his first international cap, coming on as a replacement in the RBS Six Nations match versus Ireland at the Aviva Stadium. His first start for Scotland came in June, on tour against Australia. In the 2013 Six Nations Championship he started at inside centre in all of Scotland's matches. He appeared for Scotland in a mini-tournament in South Africa in the same year. He went on Scotland's tour to Japan in 2016.

Scott's 40th and final game for Scotland was a 15-30 loss at home to South Africa in the 2021 Autumn Internationals. It was his first appearance for his country in 2 years.

== Honours ==
=== Currie RFC ===
- Scottish Premiership Champion 2010

=== Edinburgh ===
- 1872 Cup Winner (4) 2014, 2015, 2016, 2019

=== Leicester Tigers ===
- Gallagher Premiership Champion 2022

=== Scotland ===
- Hopetoun Cup Winner (2) 2012, 2017
- Centenary Quaich Winner 2013

=== Individual ===
- Edinburgh Rugby Club Centurion
