= Lee Jones (rugby union) =

Scotland international rugby union player

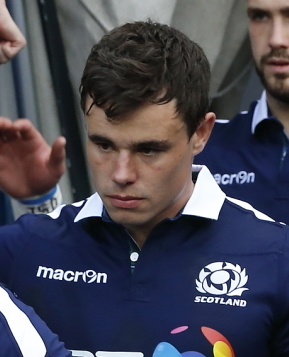
- Jones in 2017
- Born: Lee Jones; 28 June 1988 (age 38) Edinburgh, Scotland
- Height: 1.80 m (5 ft 11 in)
- Weight: 93 kg (14 st 9 lb)
- School: Selkirk High School
- University: Heriot-Watt University
- Notable relative: Charline Jones (wife)

Rugby union career
- Position: Wing
Amateur team(s)
Years	Team	Apps	(Points)
–	Selkirk RFC		
2017–18	Currie		
2018-	Glasgow Hawks		
Senior career
Years	Team	Apps	(Points)
2010–2014	Edinburgh	57	(45)
2014	→ Glasgow Warriors	6	(5)
2014–2021	Glasgow Warriors	74	(75)
- Correct as of 24 May 2018
International career
Years	Team	Apps	(Points)
2006	Scotland U20	5	(10)
2008	Scotland U23	3	(5)
2009	Scotland Club XV	-	(-)
2012–18	Scotland	8	(5)
- Correct as of 3 November 2018
National sevens team
Years	Team		Comps
2012–	Scotland 7s		82

Lee Jones (born 28 June 1988) is a Scotland international rugby union player. He played for Glasgow Warriors in the Pro14. He plays primarily at Wing but can also cover at Scrum-half.

== Rugby Union career ==
=== Amateur career ===
Jones was educated at Selkirk High School and in 2012 graduated with BEng in Mechanical Engineering from Heriot Watt University. He first played rugby for Selkirk RFC and later for the Borders’ under-16 and under-18 teams. Jones was drafted to Currie in the Scottish Premiership for the 2017-18 season. Jones has been drafted to Glasgow Hawks in the Scottish Premiership for the 2018-19 season.

=== Professional career ===
Jones joined Edinburgh Rugby in 2010 after some standout performances for his hometown club Selkirk RFC. He caught the attention of then-coach Rob Moffat, who saw Lee Jones as a player that could bring pace to the Edinburgh team.

After joining Glasgow Warriors in February 2013, Jones made his debut in an 8-6 win over Connacht at Scotstoun. He then signed a two-year deal with the club in November 2014. In March 2017, he signed an extension to his contract that would keep him with the Warriors until 2019. He signed a further 2 year deal in April 2019.

=== International career ===
Jones has played under-18, under-19 and under-20 grades and at Club XV and 7s for Scotland. He played in Scotland Club XV match against Ireland Club XV in March 2009, Scotland winning 31-18.

Jones's pace, and strength in the contact and an unquestionable eye for the try line resulted in a call up into the Scotland senior squad for the 2012 Six Nations Championship and started on the wing against England on 4 February, scoring his first try for Scotland against France, and becoming injured after a head clash with Andrew Trimble in the Scotland vs Ireland game, causing him to miss the game against Italy. To date he has won ten caps for Scotland, most recently against New Zealand in 2017.

Jones featured for Scotland 7s in the Commonwealth Games, scoring 14 tries, before extending his deal with the Warriors on a dual contract with Scotland 7s.

Jones has played on the IRB World Series Sevens circuit as well as featuring for the Warriors. He competed at the 2022 Rugby World Cup Sevens in Cape Town.
