= Gregor Hunter =

Scottish rugby union player

- Born: Gregor Hunter; 26 September 1991 (age 35) Galashiels, Scotland
- Height: 180 cm (5 ft 11 in)
- Weight: 90 kg (14 st 2 lb)

Rugby union career
- Position: Fly-half
Amateur team(s)
Years	Team	Apps	(Points)
- Gala
- Hawick
2014-16	Glasgow Hawks		
Senior career
Years	Team	Apps	(Points)
2011–14	Edinburgh Rugby	16	(43)
2014–16	Glasgow Warriors	2	(0)
International career
Years	Team	Apps	(Points)
- Scotland Club XV
Coaching career
- Years: Team
- 2016-: Gala (Youth Development Officer)

Gregor Hunter (born 26 September 1991) is a Scotland Club XV international player.

In 2012 he was awarded the Macphail Scholarship and spent four months playing club rugby in New Zealand.

Hunter joined Edinburgh as an elite development player in the summer of 2011 having come through the Scotland age grades. His time at the club was severely affected by injuries, most seriously ruled out for the whole of the 2013–14 season after injuring his knee playing for his assigned club Hawick RFC in August 2013.

With his gametime hampered he was unable to earn a renewed contract at the end of the season under new coach Alan Solomons, who had only seen him play during a short pre-season, and he was released along with other fly-halves Piers Francis and Harry Leonard in the summer of 2014. Hunter made 16 appearances for Edinburgh.

It was announced in August 2014 Hunter was joining Glasgow Warriors under a training contract. Despite undergoing ACL surgery the player was still involved with the club off the field during his rehab and helped out at Glasgow Hawks.

He was part of the Warriors squad that won the Melrose Sevens in 2014-15 but made no first team XV appearances. He was awarded a one-year partnership contract with Glasgow Warriors and Glasgow Hawks for the following season 2015-16.

He made two appearances for the Warriors including one from the bench in the Rugby World Cup hampered season.

At the end of the 2015-16 season, Hunter was released by the Warriors. On 11 June 2016 it was announced that Hunter would be the new Youth Development Officer at Gala.

Sporting positions
Preceded by Grant Gilchrist, Harry Leonard, George Turner	John Macphail Scholarship; Jonny Gray, Gregor Hunter; 2012	Succeeded by Finn Russell, Sam Hidalgo-Clyne
