= Scotland Club XV =

Scottish representative rugby union team

- Union: Scottish Rugby Union
- Coach: Bob McKillop
Team kit	Change kit

Largest win
- 57 - 27 England Counties (2016)

Largest defeat
- 10 - 44 France Federale (2013)

The Scotland national Club XV rugby union team is one of several national rugby union teams behind the Scottish national side.

The national Club XV takes the best players from club rugby in Scotland to form a side that regularly competes with a similar Ireland Club XV. The two teams play each other annually for the Dalriada Cup.

The Scotland Club XV side also regularly play with the similar England Counties XV since 2014. The French also have a Club XV side named the France Federale which the Scotland Club XV have played. Scotland Club XV has also played a Wales Club XV.

The Scotland Club XV squad was always selected with players that primarily played for their amateur clubs. Since season 2019–20 - when the Super 6 started in Scotland, as a lower level professional league - that meant that players had to be selected from the Scottish League Championship, and thus all players selected that season came from its top leagues: the Scottish Premiership and the Scottish National League Division One.

With the disbandment of the Super 6 league in 2024, the players are still selected from the amateur leagues of the Scottish Premiership and the Scottish National League Division One.

== History ==
The Club XV international fixture began in 2006 when Scotland played their Irish Club XV counterparts in Donnybrook.

The match was played on 10 March 2006. Ireland Club XV won the match 30-13.

It has since been relished by the amateur club players. Former Club XV player Rory McKay, previously of Glasgow Warriors, explained: "It gives club players something higher to aim for that previously wasn't there, while others may see it as a stepping stone to the pro game. A few years ago club players often felt they had hit a ceiling and couldn't go any further, but the thought of club international selection has upped the intensity."

== Current season ==
The Club XV fixture returned in February 2026 with a Dalriada Cup match against Ireland Club XV.

== Team ==
=== 2005-2006 ===
Scotland Club XV:

Backs: 15 Mike Adamson (Glasgow Hawks); 14 Mark Robertson (Melrose); 13 Jamie Murray (Melrose); 12 Stewart Smith (Glasgow Hawks); 11 Rory Couper (Boroughmuir); 10 Murray Strang (Glasgow Hawks); 9 Calum Cusiter (Boroughmuir)
Forwards: 1 Bruce McNeil (Hawick); 2 Wayne Mitchell (Melrose); 3 Moray Low (Aberdeen GSFP); 4 Bruce MacFarlane (Stirling County); 5 Richard Maxton (Glasgow Hawks); 6 Tam McVie (Heriot's) CAPTAIN; 8 Andy Dunlop (Biggar); 7 Angus Martyn (Boroughmuir)
Replacements: 16 David Cunningham (Boroughmuir); 17 Elliott McLaren (Biggar);18 Sandy Warnock (Glasgow Hawks);19 A Jamie Murray (Melrose); 20 Alasdhair McFarlane (Ayr); 21 Steven Duffy (Glasgow Hawks); 22 Richard Borthwick (Stewart's-Melville FP)

=== 2006-2007 ===
SCOTLAND CLUB XV:

Backs: James Thompson (Heriot's); Marc Teague (Heriot's), Graham Thomson (Dundee HSFP), John Houston (Heriot's), Rory Couper (Boroughmuir); Murray Strang (Glasgow Hawks), Alasdhair McFarlane (Ayr)
Forwards: Bruce McNeil (Hawick), Steve Lawrie (Watsonians), Richard Higgins (Melrose), Damien Kelly (Ayr), Andy Adam (Currie), Tam McVie (Heriot's) (capt), Angus Martyn (Boroughmuir), Ben Fisher (Boroughmuir).
Replacements: Andrew Kelly (GHA) for Higgins (57 mins), Mark Cairns (Currie) for Martyn (69), Cameron Goodall (Heriot's) for Thompson (72). Not used: Scott Burnett (Currie), Jeff Nicolson (Watsonians), Matt Coupar (Watsonians), Andrew Skeen (Watsonians).

=== 2007-2008 ===
SCOTLAND CLUB XV:

Backs: Stephen Ruddick (Boroughmuir); Marc Teague (Heriot's), Graham Thomson (Dundee HSFP), Malcolm Clapperton (Boroughmuir), Rory Couper (Boroughmuir); Andrew Skeen (Watsonians), Richard Snedden (Currie)
Forwards: Bruce McNeil (Heriot's), Sean Crombie (Boroughmuir), Jon Welsh (GHA), Damien Kelly (Ayr), Andy Adam (Currie), Tam McVie (Heriot's) (capt), Ross Weston (Currie), Angus Martyn (Boroughmuir)
Replacements: Pat MacArthur (Ayr), Garry Mountford (Stirling County), Graeme Dodds (Melrose), George Oommen (Dundee HSFP), Greg Cottrell (Boroughmuir), Colin Goudie (Heriot's), Dougie Brown (Watsonians)

Scotland v Wales Club XV - 8 February 2008

Wales Club XV 7 Scotland Club XV 34

Wales Club XV Try: S Martin Con: E Williams

Scotland Club XV Tries: M Teague (2), A Martyn, A Skeen, R Snedden Cons: A Skeen (3) Pen: A Skeen

Scotland Club XV

15. Stephen Ruddick (Boroughmuir) 14. Marc Teague (Heriot's) 13. Graham Thomson (Dundee High FP) 12. Jamie Murray (Melrose) 11. Rory Couper (Boroughmuir) 10. Andrew Skeen (Watsonians) 9. Richard Snedden (Currie) 1. Bruce McNeil (Heriot's) 2. Sean Crombie (Boroughmuir) 3. Jon Welsh (GHA) 4. Damien Kelly (Ayr) 5. Andy Adam (Currie) 6. Tam McVie (Heriot's) (c) 7. Angus Martyn (Boroughmuir) 8. Ross Weston (Currie)

Substitutes

16. Pat MacArthur (Ayr) 17. Garry Mountford (Stirling County) 18. Graeme Dodds (Melrose) 19. George Oommen (Dundee High FP) 20. Greg Cottrell (Boroughmuir) 21. Dougie Brown (Watsonians) 22. Colin Goudie (Heriot's)

Wales Clubs XV: Tom Botwood (Llantrisant); Tom Bonnell (Narberth) (rep: Gethin Davies (Brecon)), Steve Martin (Narberth), Matthew Lewis (Builth Wells, captain), Andrew Mead (Llangennech); Emyr Williams (Narberth) (rep: Michael Jones (Llantwit Fardre), Andrew Davies (Narberth) (rep: Glenn Holloway (Llantrisant); Alun Davies (Whitland), Gareth John (Pembroke) (rep: Anthony Payne (Caerrphilly), James Huntley (Rhiwbina) (rep: Matthew Petit (Caerphilly), Chris James (Narberth), Lee Williams (Newport Saracens) (rep: Kyle Coulter (Bridgend Ath)), Lee Edwards (Newport Saracens) (rep: Shaun Miles (Ammanford)), Colin Davies (Cardigan), Andrew Packer (Newport Saracens)

=== 2008-2009 ===
Scotland Club XV:

Backs: Fraser Harkness (Selkirk); Colin Goudie (Heriot's), Malcolm Clapperton (Boroughmuir), Dougie Brown (Watsonians), Lee Jones (Selkirk); Scott Wight (Melrose), Alasdhair McFarlane (Ayr)
Forwards: Alan Dymock (Heriot's), Pat MacArthur (Ayr), Elliot McLaren (West of Scotland), Damien Kelly (Ayr), Scott Sutherland (Ayr), John Dalziel (Melrose) (capt), Angus Martyn (Boroughmuir), Ross Weston (Currie).
Replacements: Scott Burnett (Heriot's), Gordon Reid (Ayr), Allan Kelly (Hawks), Andy Dunlop (Ayr), Richard Snedden (Currie), Gavin Craig (Selkirk), Dave McCall (Heriot's).

=== 2009-2010 ===
SCOTLAND CLUB XV against Scotland U20:

Fraser Harkness (Selkirk); Callum Anderson (Melrose), Jamie Murray (Melrose), James King (Melrose), Fraser Thomson (Melrose); Scott Wight (Melrose), Richard Snedden (Currie); Gordon Reid (Ayr), Scott Burnett (Heriot's), Alastair Hamilton (Currie), Damien Kelly (Ayr), Rory McKay (Glasgow Hawks), John Dalziel CAPTAIN (Melrose), Paul Burke (Ayr), Ross Weston (Currie) Replacements (all used)John Cox (Currie), Andy Reekie (Currie), Andy Dunlop (Ayr), Scott Sutherland (Ayr), Gregor Wood (Watsonians), Jamie Hunter (Ayr), Scott Hendrie (Selkirk), Andy MacMahon (Currie)

SCOTLAND CLUB XV against Ireland Club XV:

Backs: Fraser Harkness (Selkirk); James Fleming (Dundee), Malcolm Clapperton (Boroughmuir), James King (Melrose), Fraser Thomson (Melrose); Scott Wight (Melrose), Richard Sneddon (Currie)
Forwards: Gordon Reid (Ayr), Finlay Gillies (Heriot's), Alastair Hamilton (Currie), Damien Kelly (Ayr), Rory McKay (Glasgow Hawks), John Dalziel (Melrose) (capt), Mark Cairns (Currie), Ross Weston (Currie).
Replacements: Gregor Wood (Watsonians), Alan Dymock (Heriot's), Scott Sutherland (Ayr), Andrew Dunlop (Ayr), Graham Wilson (Heriot's), Andrew MacMahon (Currie), Cameron Fergus (Dundee).

Scotland v France Federale 5 Feb 2010

Scotland: F Harkness (Selkirk); C Anderson (Melrose), M Clapperton (Boroughmuir), J King, F Thomson; S Wight (all Melrose), R Snedden (Currie) (J Hunter (Ayr) 69); A Dymock, (Heriot's (G Reid (Ayr) 46) S Burnett (Heriot's) (G Wood (Watsonians 75), A Brown (Dundee) (A Hamilton (Currie) 46), D Kelly (Ayr), R McKay (Glasgow Hawks) (S Suherland (Ayr) 58), J Dalziel (Melrose) capt, M Cairns (Currie) (P Burke (Ayr) 52), R Weston (Currie).

France: S Mercier (ES Catalane); G Lavergne (Bobigny), A Frenet (Bourg-en-Bresse), J Lesgourgues (Tyrosse) (J-B Lafitte 40), S Sarthou (Saint Etienne); M Maillard (Valence d'Agen), G Dulay (Valence D'Agen) (B Lombarteaix (Monteux) 68); A Falieres (Montlucon), R Escudier (Perigeux) (F Cazalot (Lourdes) 49), N Mateos (Marmande-Casteljaloux), (N Kwarazfelia (Lavaur) 49) S Pinet (Orleans), M Ameur (Leucate) S Lassiasz (Montmelian 49), J Matheron (Monteux), L Lafitte (Tyrosse) (A Biscay (Niort) 63), F Soldan (Valence D'Agen).

=== 2010-2011 ===
Scotland Club XV squad against Ireland Club XV on 11 March 2011:

Backs: Tom Brown (Currie); Fraser Thomson (Melrose), Ross Curle (Ayr), Dean Kelbrick (Glasgow Hawks), Dougie Fife (Currie); Scott Wight (Melrose), Richard Sneddon (Currie)
Forwards: Gordon Reid (Ayr), Eric Milligan (Glasgow Hawks), Bruce McNeil (Hawick), Damien Kelly (Ayr), Rory McKay (Glasgow Hawks), John Dalziel (Melrose) (capt), Rob Colhoun (Ayr), Ross Weston (Currie).
Replacements: Finlay Gillies (Currie), Alan Dymock (Heriot's), Nick Campbell (Glasgow Hawks), Andy Dunlop (Ayr), Andy Dymock (Dundee), Matt Scott (Currie), Harry Duthie (Dundee).

=== 2011-2012 ===
Scotland Club XV played against Ireland Club XV on 9 March 2012. The side was:

Backs: Fraser Thomson (Melrose); C Anderson (Aberdeen Grammar), Ross Curle (Ayr), Dean Kelbrick (Glasgow Hawks), Dougie Fife (Currie); Lee Miller (Gala), A Black (Edinburgh Accies)
Forwards: J Cox (Currie), S Crombie (Boroughmuir) (capt), Alan Brown (Dundee HSFP), Scott Sutherland (Ayr), Rory McKay (Glasgow Hawks), G Dodds (Melrose), Rob Colhoun (Ayr), R Weston (Currie)
Replacements: G Holborn (Melrose) for Alan Brown, N Dymock (Dundee) for Cox, both 50mins, R Hawkins (Dundee) for Sutherland, A Rose (Boroughmuir) for Dodds, both 55, Fraser Brown (Heriot's) for Crombie, M Ward (Aberdeen Grammar) for Black, D Gilmour (Stirling County) for Kelbrick, all 65.

Against France Federale on 24 February 2012:

Backs: Harkness, C. Anderson (Aberdeen Grammar), Ross Curle (Ayr), Dean Kelbrick (Glasgow Hawks), Fraser Thomson (Melrose), Lee Millar (Gala), Richard Snedden (Currie)
Forwards: Alan Dymock, S. Crombie (Boroughmuir), Alan Brown (Dundee HSFP), Rory McKay (Glasgow Hawks), Scott Sutherland (Ayr), G. Dodds (Melrose), R. Colhoun (Ayr), R. Weston (Currie)
Replacements: Fraser Brown, J. Cox (Currie), G. Holburn (Melrose), R. Hawkins (Dundee HSFP), A. Rose (Boroughmuir), M. Ward (Aberdeen Grammar), Edwards, Gilmour

=== 2012-2013 ===
SCOTLAND CLUB XV:

Backs: Callum Anderson (Melrose), Ross Curle (Ayr), Jamie Forbes (Currie), Stuart Edwards (Stirling County), Danny Gilmour (Stirling County), Craig Gossman (Ayr), George Graham (Gala), Rory Hutton (Hawick), Dean Kelbrick (Ayr), Max Learmonth (Heriot's), Murray McConnell (Ayr), Lee Millar (Gala), Craig Robertson (Gala) Rory Steele (Watsonians) and Fraser Thomson (Melrose).
Forwards: Alex Allan (Edinburgh Accies), Fraser Brown (Heriot's), Kevin Bryce (Heriot's), Mark Cairns (Currie), Greg Campbell (Edinburgh Accies), Nick Cox (Ayr), Gary Graham (Gala), Jason Hill (Heriot's), Robin Hislop (Boroughmuir), Gary Holborn (Melrose), George Hunter (Ayr), Ewan McQuillin (Gala), Ross Miller (Melrose), Andrew Nagle (Melrose), Luke Pettie (Gala), Andy Redmayne (Dundee HSFP), Grant Runciman (Melrose), Scott Sutherland (Ayr), Jamie Swanson (Boroughmuir), Dan Teague (Edinburgh Accies) and Hamish Watson (Edinburgh Accies).

=== 2013-2014 ===
Scotland Club XV played the Scotland U20 side on 22 January 2014. The squad was:

Backs: Nyle Godsmark (Edinburgh Accies), Erlend Oag (Aberdeen Grammar), Chris Auld (Gala), Ewan Scott (Gala), Grant Sommerville (Gala), Richard Mill (Melrose), Peter Jericevich (Ayr), Craig Gossman (Ayr), George Graham (Gala) and Greg Cottrell (Hawick).
Forwards: Alex Allan (Edinburgh Accies), Lindsey Gibson (Hawick), Ewan McQuillin (Gala), Murray Douglas (Heriot's), Russell Nimmo (Heriot's), Andrew Nagle (Melrose), Will Bordill (Stirling County), Jamie Swanson (Stirling County), George Hunter (Ayr), Fergus Scott (Ayr ), Nick Cox (Ayr), Callum Templeton (Ayr), Andy Redmayne (Glasgow Hawks) and Gary Graham (Gala).

Scotland Club XV played the France Federale side on 7 March 2014. They lost 3-30.

Scotland Club XV: N Godsmark; E Oag, C Auld, J Steele, C Gossman; S Edwards, George Graham, R Sutherland, F Scott, E McQuillin, C Borthwick, M Douglas, A Nagle, J Hill, W Bordill. Subs used: L Gibson N Little, S Cessford, C Templeton, Gary Graham, P Jericevich, R Mill, G Somerville.

France Federale: R Lamarque; P Lafitte, J Rouge, J-B Lafitte, S Bonvalot; J Lavie, P Dubert; A Nicolas, R Lauga, A Attia, B Senac, A Potente, G Geledan, L Bezert, J Capdeillayre. Subs used: R Palomera, F Dupuy, K Kahn, J-B Cros, J-F Cruzalebes, H Dupont, R-E Samuel, A Etchegaray.

=== 2014-2015 ===
The Scotland Club XV played their Irish counterparts on 5 Feb 2015. They won 23 -18.

The team on that day was:

Backs: Fraser Thomson; Craig Gossman, Liam Steele, Ross Curle, Scott McLeod; Stuart Edwards, Graham Wilson;
Forwards: Nick Beavon, R Anderson, S Cessford, Russell Nimmo, Iain Moody, Jason Hill, Will Bordill, Ross Weston
Replacements: Fergus Scott for Anderson 56, Ewan McQuillin for Fagerson 50, Peter Eccles for Hill 75, Tommy Spinks for Weston 64, George Graham for Wilson 79

The Scotland Club XV played their English counterparts on 28 February 2015. They lost 3-37.

The team on that day was:

Backs: 15 Fraser Thomson (Melrose), 14 Craig Gossman (Ayr), 13 Liam Steele (Heriot's), 12 Chris Auld (Gala), 11 Scott McLeod (Hawick), 10 Stuart Edwards (Heriot's), 9 Graham Wilson (Heriot's) VICE-CAPTAIN:
Forwards: 1 Nick Beavon (Melrose), 2 Fergus Scott (Ayr), 3 Ewan McQuillin (Melrose), 4 Russell Nimmo (Heriot's), 5 Iain Moody (Boroughmuir), 6 Jason Hill (Heriot's), 7 Peter Eccles (Melrose), 8 Ross Weston (Currie) CAPTAIN
Replacements: 16 Russell Anderson (Gala), 17 Fraser Watt (Ayr), 18 Shawn Muir (Hawick), 19 Malcolm Peacock (Currie), 20 George Graham (Gala), 21 Gregor McNeish (Heriot's), 22 Keith Buchan (Heriot's) (all replacements used)

=== 2015-2016 ===
Scotland Club XV:

Backs: Fraser Thomson (Melrose); Sam Pecquer (Melrose), Ross Curle (Ayr) CAPTAIN, Brendan McGroarty (Glasgow Hawks), Jordan Edmunds (Boroughmuir); Lee Armstrong (Hawick), Paddy Boyer (Glasgow Hawks)
Forwards: George Hunter (Ayr), Ross Graham (Hawick), Nick Beavon (Melrose), Rob McAlpine (Ayr), Lewis Carmichael (Melrose), Jack Turley (Heriot's), Will Bordill (Ayr), Peter McCallum (Ayr)
Replacements: Michael Liness (Heriot's), Alistair Hamilton (Heriot's), Jamie Bhatti (Melrose), Russell Nimmo (Heriot's), Neil Irvine-Hess (Melrose), George Graham (Gala), Cameron Ferguson (Heriot's), Harvey Elms (Currie).

=== 2016-2017 ===
The Scotland Club XV played Scotland U20 in January 2017.

The Scotland Club XV played their English counterparts on 24 February 2017.

The squad announced was:

Backs: 15. Fraser Thomson (Melrose), 14. Harvey Elms (Currie), 13. Ross Curle (Ayr), 12. George Taylor (Melrose), 11. Jordan Edmunds, (Boroughmuir), 10. Chris Laidlaw (Boroughmuir), 9. Murdo McAndrew (Melrose)
Forwards: 1. Steven Findlay (Glasgow Hawks), 2. Michael Liness (Heriot's), 3. Steven Longwell (Ayr), 4. Rob McAlpine (Ayr), 5. Callum Marshall (Heriot's), 6. Iain Moody (Melrose), 7. Grant Runciman (Melrose), 8. Peter McCallum CAPTAIN (Ayr)
Replacements: 16. Russell Anderson (Melrose), 17. Gary Strain (Glasgow Hawks), 18. John Cox (Currie), 19. Blair MacPherson (Ayr), 20. Will Bordill (Ayr), 21. David Armstrong (Ayr), 22. Robbie Nelson (Currie), 23. Kerr Gossman (Glasgow Hawks)

=== 2017-2018 ===
The Scotland Club XV played the Scotland U20 side on 23 January 2018.

The squad announced was:

Backs: Jamie Forbes (Currie); Jordan Edmunds (Boroughmuir), Ross Curle (Stirling Co), Robbie Nelson (Currie), Craig Gossman (Ayr); Craig Jackson (Melrose), Charlie Shiel (Currie)
Forwards: Shawn Muir (Hawick), Ross Graham (Watsonians), Steven Longwell (Ayr), Jack Turley (Heriots), Iain Moody (Melrose), Neil Irvine Hess (Melrose), Peter McCallum (Ayr), Grant Runciman (Melrose).
Replacements: Scott Bickerstaff (Marr), Murdo McAndrew (Melrose), David Armstrong (Ayr), N Fraser (Watsonians), Struan Cessford (Heriots), Johnny Matthews (Boroughmuir), Russell Anderson (Melrose), Hamish Bain (Currie), R Leishman (Stirling Co), Thomas Gordon (Currie), R Drummond (Watsonians)

=== 2018-2019 ===
The Scotland Club XV squad for 2019 was:

Backs: Andrew Simmers (Heriot's), David Armstrong (Ayr), Murdo McAndrew (Melrose), Gregor Hunter (Currie), Frazier Climo (Ayr), Lee Armstrong (Hawick), Craig Jackson (Melrose), Robbie Nelson (Currie), Ewan McGarvie (Stirling), Danny McCluskey (Ayr), Craig Gossman (Boroughmuir), Fraser Thomson (Melrose), Jordan Edmonds (Boroughmuir), Kyle Rowe (Ayr), Ben Robbins (Currie), Jamie Forbes (Currie)
Forwards: Shawn Muir (Hawick), Steven Longwell (Ayr), Struan Cessford (Heriot's), Ross Dunbar (Boroughmuir), Ross Graham (Watsonians), Russell Anderson (Melrose), Blair Macpherson (Ayr), Jamie Hodgson (Watsonians), Iain Moody (Melrose), Callum Aitkinson (Boroughmuir), Hamilton Burr (Stirling), Ruaridh Leishman (Heriot's), Grant Runciman (Melrose), Ian Wilson (Heriot's), Jack McLean (Heriot's), Neil Irvine-Hess (Melrose), Tommy Spinks (Ayr), Thomas Gordon (Currie).

=== 2019-2020 ===
The Scotland Club XV squad for 2020 was:

Forwards: Calvin Henderson (Marr), Craig Owenson (Musselburgh), Ewan Bulger (Marr), Ewan MacDougall (Selkirk), Fergus Scott (Currie Chieftains), Fraser Christie (Glasgow Hawks), Gary Strain (Glasgow Hawks), Graeme Carson (Currie Chieftains), Gregor Law (Jed-Forest), James Bett (Selkirk), Jamie Sole (Edinburgh Accies), Matty Carryer (Hawick), Michael Vernel (Currie Chieftains), Nat Coe (Aberdeen Grammar), Ollie Rossi (Marr), Rhys Davies (Currie Chieftains), Robin Cessford (Aberdeen Grammar), Shawn Muir (Hawick), Wallace Nelson (Currie Chieftains), William Farquhar (Marr),

Backs: Aaron McColm (Selkirk), Andrew Mitchell (Hawick), Calum Young (Jed-Forest), Colin Sturgeon (Marr), Conor Bickerstaff (Marr), Scott Bickerstaff (Marr), Grant Mollison (GHA), Greg Montgomery (Marr), Gregor Christie (Currie Chieftains), Gregor Hunter (Currie Chieftains), Jack Preston (Marr), Patrick Boyer (Glasgow Hawks), Richard Mill (Edinburgh Accies), Ryan Cottrell (Selkirk), Steven Hamilton (Currie Chieftains)

=== 2025-2026 ===
The Scotland Club XV to play Ireland Club XV in 2026 was named:

Forwards: 1. Jack Dobie (Melrose RFC), 2. Fraser Renwick (Hawick RFC), 3. Struan Cessford (Heriot’s Rugby), 4. Angus Runciman (Melrose RFC), 5. Oscar Baird (Ayr RFC), 6. Ruairidh Leishman (Heriot’s Rugby), 7. Tim Brown (Ayr RFC), 8. Blair MacPherson (C) (Ayr RFC)

Backs: 9. Gregor Christie (Currie Chieftains), 10. Dwain Patterson (Kelso RFC), 11. Ben Pickles (Selkirk RFC), 12. Bobby Beattie (Ayr RFC), 13. Andrew Mitchell (Hawick RFC), 14. Jamie Shedden (Ayr RFC), 15. Glenn Bryce (VC) (Stirling County RFC)

Replacements: Elliot Young, Jamie Drummond, Dan Gamble, Ruaraidh Hart, Sam Wallace, Euan McKirdy, Callum Anderson, Archie Barbour.
