= Scotland national under-17 rugby union team =

Scotland under-17
- Union: Scottish Rugby Union
| Team kit | Change kit |

The Scotland national under-17 rugby union team was one of several junior national rugby union teams behind the Scottish national side.

Scotland has replaced this age grade with the under-18 side.

The last time Scotland fielded an under-17 national side was in 2018.

== See also ==
=== Men's National teams ===
==== Senior ====
- Scotland national rugby union team
- Scotland A national rugby union team
- Scotland national rugby sevens team

==== Development ====
- Emerging Scotland
- Scotland B national rugby union team
- Scotland Club XV

==== Age Grades ====
- Scotland national under-21 rugby union team
- Scotland national under-20 rugby union team
- Scotland national under-19 rugby union team
- Scotland national under-18 rugby union team
- Scotland national under-17 rugby union team
- Scotland national under-16 rugby union team

=== Women's National teams ===
==== Senior ====
- Scotland women's national rugby union team
- Scotland women's national rugby union team (sevens)
