= 2023–24 Glasgow Warriors season =

Glasgow Warriors 2023–2024
- Ground: Scotstoun Stadium (Capacity: 7,351)
- Coach: (South Africa) Franco Smith
- Captain: (Scotland) Kyle Steyn
- Most caps: (New Zealand) Tom Jordan (26)
- Top scorer: (Scotland) George Horne (108)
- Most tries: (Scotland) Johnny Matthews (14)
- League: United Rugby Championship
- 4th (champions)
1st kit	2nd kit

The 2023–24 season will see Glasgow Warriors compete in the United Rugby Championship and the European Rugby Champions Cup.

== Season overview ==
This year's academy intake saw a number of GHA players included. Finlay Burgess was transferred from Glasgow to the Edinburgh Rugby academy.

== Team ==
=== Coaches ===
- Head coach: (South Africa) Franco Smith
- Assistant coach: (Scotland) Peter Murchie
- Assistant coach: (Scotland) Peter Horne
- Assistant coach: (Ireland) Nigel Carolan
- Scrum Coach: (Scotland) Alasdair Dickinson
- Head Strength and Conditioning Coach: (Ireland) Cillian Reardon
- Senior Athletic Performance Coach: Damien O'Donoghue
- Sport Scientist: Robin Reidy
- Lead Performance Analyst: Greg Woolard
- Asst. Performance Analyst: Eilidh Wright
- Asst. Performance Analyst: Aidan FitzGerald

=== Staff ===
- Managing Director: Alastair Kellock
- Chairman: Charles Shaw
- Advisory Group: Walter Malcolm, Douglas McCrea, Alan Lees, Paul Taylor, Frank Mitchell, Scott Mathieson
- Rugby Operations Manager: John Manson
- Assistant Operations Manager: Martin Malone
- Kit & Equipment Manager: Dougie Mills
- Head groundsman: Colin McKinnon
- Team Doctor: Dr. Jonathan Hanson
- Clinical Manager and Lead Physiotherapist: Andrew Boag
- Senior Team Physiotherapist: Hene Branders
- Senior Team Physiotherapist: Michael Clark
- Junior Physiotherapist: Christina Finlay
- Communications and Marketing Manager: Cameron MacAllister
- Marketing manager: Claire Scott
- Event Manager: Duncan Seller
- Content Producer: Robyn Struthers
- Administrator: Jana Tobin
- Communications Manager: Craig Wright
- Communications Assistant: Molly Mitchell
- Commercial Manager: Jamie Robertson
- Lead Account Manager: Omar Muhyeddeen
- Partnership Account Manager: Catherine Bunch
- Sponsorship Co-Ordinator: Megan Kennedy
- Community Manager: Stuart Lewis
- Business Club Manager: Adam Ashe

=== Squad ===
Hookers (Scotland) Fraser Brown (Scotland) Angus Fraser (Scotland) Gregor Hiddleston (Scotland) Johnny Matthews (Scotland) Grant Stewart (Scotland) George Turner Props (Scotland) Jamie Bhatti (Scotland) Allan Dell (Scotland) Zander Fagerson (Scotland) Oli Kebble (South Africa) Nathan McBeth (Argentina) Enrique Pieretto (Argentina) Lucio Sordoni (Scotland) Murphy Walker Locks (Scotland) Scott Cummings (South Africa) JP du Preez (Scotland) Richie Gray (United States) Greg Peterson (Scotland) Alex Samuel (Scotland) Max Williamson	Loose Forwards (Scotland) Gregor Brown (Scotland) Rory Darge (Scotland) Jack Dempsey (Scotland) Matt Fagerson (Scotland) Euan Ferrie (Scotland) Thomas Gordon (South Africa) Sintu Manjezi (Scotland) Jack Mann (Scotland) Ally Miller (Tonga) Sione Vailanu (South Africa) Henco Venter Scrum halves (Scotland) Ben Afshar (Scotland) Jamie Dobie (Scotland) George Horne (Scotland) Sean Kennedy Fly halves (New Zealand) Tom Jordan (Scotland) Richie Simpson (Scotland) Ross Thompson (Scotland) Duncan Weir	Centres (Scotland) Huw Jones (Scotland) Stafford McDowall (Scotland) Duncan Munn (Scotland) Sione Tuipulotu Back Three (Argentina) Sebastián Cancelliere (Argentina) Facundo Cordero (New Zealand) Josh McKay (Scotland) Kyle Rowe (Scotland) Ollie Smith (Scotland) Kyle Steyn (Scotland) Logan Trotter

==== Scottish Rugby Academy Stage 3 players ====
These players are given a professional contract by the Scottish Rugby Academy. Although given placements they are not contracted by Glasgow Warriors. Players graduate from the academy when a professional club contract is offered.

These players are assigned to Glasgow Warriors for the season 2023–24.

Academy players promoted in the course of the season are listed with the main squad.

- (Scotland) Tom Banatvala – Prop
- (Scotland) Callum Norrie – Prop
- (Scotland) Callum Smyth – Prop
- (Scotland) Ryan Burke – Lock
- (Scotland) Harris McLeod – Lock
- (Scotland) Ruaraidh Hart – Flanker
- (Scotland) Jonny Morris – Flanker
- (Scotland) Matthew Urwin – Fly-half
- (Scotland) Ben Salmon – Centre
- (Scotland) Johnny Ventisei – Centre
- (Scotland) Kerr Yule – Centre
- (Scotland) Amena Caqusau – Wing
- (Scotland) Logan Jarvie – Wing
- (Scotland) Kerr Johnston – Wing
- (Scotland) Fergus Watson – Full Back

==== Back up players ====
Other players used by Glasgow Warriors over the course of the season.

- (Scotland) Craig Miller (Ayrshire Bulls) - Prop
- (Scotland) Corey Tait (Boroughmuir Bears) - Hooker
- (Scotland) Fraser Allan (Howe of Fife) - Hooker
- (Scotland) David Andrew (Marr) - Lock
- (Scotland) Connor Gordon (Stirling Wolves) - Flanker
- (Scotland) Mark McCornick (Newton Stewart) - Flanker
- (Scotland) Tom Smith (Stirling Wolves) - Flanker
- (Scotland) Eric Davey (Stirling Wolves) - Scrum Half
- (Scotland) James Imrie (Glasgow Hawks) - Scrum Half
- (Scotland) Connor McAlpine (Watsonians) - Scrum Half
- (Scotland) Findlay Thomson (Watsonians) - Centre
- (Scotland) Luca Bardelli (Ayrshire Bulls) - Wing
- (Scotland) Aidan Cross (Southern Knights) - Wing
- (Scotland) Jack Blain (Heriot's Rugby) - Full Back
- (Scotland) Ollie Horne (Ayrshire Bulls) - Full Back
- (Scotland) Andy Stirrat (Ayrshire Bulls) - Full Back

== Player statistics ==
During the 2023–24 season, Glasgow have used 45 different players in competitive games. The table below shows the number of appearances and points scored by each player.

Position	Nation	Name	United Rugby Championship			Champions Cup			Total	
Position	Nation	Name	Apps (sub)	Tries	Points kicked	Apps (sub)	Tries	Points kicked	Apps (sub)	Total Pts
HK	(Scotland)	Angus Fraser	3(5)	2	0	(1)	0	0	3(6)	10
HK	(Scotland)	Gregor Hiddleston	2(5)	3	0	1(1)	0	0	3(6)	15
HK	(Scotland)	Johnny Matthews	12(8)	14	0	2(1)	1	0	14(9)	75
HK	(Scotland)	Grant Stewart	1(1)	0	0	0	0	0	1(1)	0
HK	(Scotland)	George Turner	3(4)	2	0	2(2)	0	0	5(6)	10
PR	(Scotland)	Jamie Bhatti	11(2)	1	0	3(1)	0	0	14(3)	5
PR	(Scotland)	Allan Dell	1(5)	1	0	0	0	0	1(5)	5
PR	(Scotland)	Zander Fagerson	12(4)	0	0	4(1)	0	0	16(5)	0
PR	(South Africa)	Nathan McBeth	5(10)	0	0	1(2)	0	0	6(12)	0
PR	(Argentina)	Enrique Pieretto	(2)	0	0	0	0	0	(2)	0
PR	(Argentina)	Lucio Sordoni	7(6)	1	0	1(2)	0	0	8(8)	5
PR	(Scotland)	Murphy Walker	2	0	0	0	0	0	2	0
LK	(Scotland)	Scott Cummings	13(3)	2	0	4	1	0	17(3)	15
LK	(Scotland)	Richie Gray	10(1)	0	0	1(2)	0	0	11(3)	0
LK	(United States)	Greg Peterson	3(6)	0	0	1	0	0	4(6)	0
LK	(Scotland)	Alex Samuel	3(2)	0	0	2(1)	0	0	5(3)	0
LK	(Scotland)	Max Williamson	7(8)	2	0	2(2)	0	0	9(10)	10
BR	(Scotland)	Gregor Brown	4(3)	0	0	1	0	0	5(3)	0
BR	(Scotland)	Rory Darge	13(1)	1	0	2	0	0	15(1)	5
BR	(Scotland)	Jack Dempsey	8(1)	0	0	2	0	0	10(1)	0
BR	(Scotland)	Matt Fagerson	11(1)	1	0	4	0	0	15(1)	5
BR	(Scotland)	Euan Ferrie	4(5)	1	0	(2)	0	0	4(7)	5
BR	(Scotland)	Thomas Gordon	5(4)	0	0	1	0	0	6(4)	0
BR	(Scotland)	Ruaraidh Hart	(1)	0	0	0	0	0	(1)	0
BR	(South Africa)	Sintu Manjezi	4(6)	0	0	1(1)	0	0	5(7)	0
BR	(Scotland)	Ally Miller	4(7)	1	0	3(1)	1	0	7(8)	10
BR	(Tonga)	Sione Vailanu	6(1)	2	0	(1)	0	0	6(2)	10
BR	(South Africa)	Henco Venter	10(8)	1	0	1(2)	0	0	11(10)	5
SH	(Scotland)	Ben Afshar	1(5)	1	0	(2)	0	0	1(7)	5
SH	(Scotland)	Jamie Dobie	7(9)	1	0	(1)	0	0	7(10)	5
SH	(Scotland)	George Horne	12(4)	4	67	4	1	16	16(4)	108
SH	(Scotland)	Sean Kennedy	2(3)	1	0	1	0	0	3(3)	5
FH	(New Zealand)	Tom Jordan	16(5)	3	14	3(2)	0	0	19(7)	29
FH	(Scotland)	Ross Thompson	4(5)	1	23	1(1)	0	4	5(6)	32
FH	(Scotland)	Duncan Weir	5(8)	1	45	1(1)	0	4	6(9)	54
CE	(Scotland)	Huw Jones	8	2	0	4	2	0	12	20
CE	(Scotland)	Stafford McDowall	17	4	0	3(1)	0	0	20(1)	20
CE	(Scotland)	Duncan Munn	(2)	0	0	0	0	0	(2)	0
CE	(Scotland)	Sione Tuipulotu	15	1	0	4	1	0	19	10
WG	(Argentina)	Sebastián Cancelliere	13	5	0	1	1	0	14	30
WG	(Argentina)	Facundo Cordero	4	1	0	0	0	0	4	5
WG	(Scotland)	Kyle Rowe	13	9	0	4	3	0	17	60
WG	(Scotland)	Kyle Steyn	10	5	0	2	0	0	12	25
FB	(New Zealand)	Josh McKay	17	5	0	5	2	0	22	35
FB	(Scotland)	Ollie Smith	3	0	0	2	1	0	5	5

== Staff movements ==
=== Coaches ===
==== Personnel out ====
Peter Horne to Scotland (Asst.) (from November 2023)

== Player movements ==
=== Academy promotions ===
- (Scotland) Duncan Munn from Scottish Rugby Academy
- (Scotland) Ben Afshar from Scottish Rugby Academy

Munn is on a partnership contract with Boroughmuir Bears and Glasgow Warriors
Afshar is on a partnership contract with Stirling Wolves and Glasgow Warriors

=== Player transfers ===
==== In ====
- (South Africa) Henco Venter from (South Africa) Sharks
- (Scotland) Kyle Rowe from (England) London Irish
- (Scotland) Logan Trotter from (England) London Irish
- (United States) Greg Peterson from (England) Newcastle Falcons
- (Scotland) Richie Simpson from (Scotland) Ayrshire Bulls
- (Scotland) Grant Stewart from (Scotland) Ayrshire Bulls

==== Out ====
- (New Zealand) Cole Forbes to (New Zealand) Bay of Plenty
- (England) Lewis Bean to (France) Montauban
- (Scotland) Ryan Wilson released
- (Scotland) Simon Berghan released
- (England) Cameron Neild released
- (Scotland) Sam Johnson to (France) Brive
- (Scotland) Rhys Tait to (England) Doncaster Knights
- (Scotland) Archie Smeaton to (England) Doncaster Knights
- (Scotland) Finlay Burgess to (Scotland) Edinburgh
- (Scotland) Ross McKnight to (Scotland) Stirling Wolves
- (Scotland) Christian Townsend to (Australia) Warringah
- (Scotland) Jamie Drummond to (Scotland) Ayrshire Bulls
- (Scotland) Andy Stirrat to (Scotland) Ayrshire Bulls
- (Argentina) Domingo Miotti to (France) Oyonnax
- (Scotland) Ali Price to (Scotland) Edinburgh (season-long loan)
- (Argentina) Enrique Pieretto to (Australia) New South Wales Waratahs (loan)

Simpson is on a partnership contract with Ayrshire Bulls and Glasgow Warriors

== Competitions ==
=== Pre-season and friendlies ===
Glasgow Warriors announced on 23 June 2023 a pre-season friendly match with Zebre Parma in September. The 6pm kick off was chosen so as not to clash with the Scotland versus Romania match. Zebre provided cap numbers with their player line-ups.

With 16 players at the World Cup, the Warriors fielded an experimental side with a host of academy players involved. In addition, the 22 year old scrum half Jamie Dobie was named as captain. The Warriors head coach Franco Smith explained:

Tomorrow sees us take the next step in our pre-season preparations, as we take on a Zebre Parma team that will test us across the field. The players have worked hard since returning to Scotstoun, and everyone is looking forward to getting back out there.

We’re also pleased to give an opportunity to some of our academy players, who have earned their opportunity with their efforts in pre-season so far. The growth of our squad and Scottish rugby overall is a priority for us, so we’re excited to give these young players their chance.

It's good to work with players we might not have the opportunity to work with so closely over the rest of the season. So it's a huge opportunity to work with these young players, the next generation of Scottish players and Glasgow Warriors players, and expose them to our environment. We’re excited about getting back out there - the players more than I am. Everybody is ready for the next step.

[Jamie Dobie] leads more by example, which we always appreciate more than just someone leading by his voice. The leadership qualities that he's presented over the last year have been extraordinary, so he's been rewarded for his manner, the way he goes about his business, and influencing the players around him. Through his contribution he merits this chance - he's definitely part of our leadership group going forward.

Franco Smith was happy with the run out for Glasgow Warriors. He was also pleased to see his son play well from the bench for Zebre.

Kyle Rowe has shown tonight that there's some class about him. I think he's definitely going to be important for us. But all of these players are going to be important.

We'll have this big group coming back from the World Cup who will need to be managed physically, emotionally and mentally. So to keep everybody at their best we’re going to have to look to our depth and that's what we are working hard on at this stage.

It was fantastic to see [Franco Jnr.] and he did well. He can be happy with what he brought to it in the second half.

The away fixture to Cavan to play Ulster proved just too much for the young Warriors side. Franco Smith was nevertheless happy with what he saw from the players:

I think without the ball we were really good. We probably made between 220 and 230 tackles which is what is necessary from a fitness perspective, from a character perspective, from a team-building perspective.

In that regard I'm really happy with the players attitude.

I'm obviously disappointed we didn't get anything going in attack. I think Ulster deprived us well of ball at the breakdown specifically so there's a lot of work to do but that's in our DNA so I don't have too much concern about that.

Look, again, there's a young bunch of players, players that didn't get the opportunity last season that have worked hard in preseason.

==== Match 1 ====
30 September 2023
6pm

Glasgow Warriors (Scotland)	33 - 29	(Italy) Zebre Parma
Try: Jamie Dobie; Kyle Rowe x 2 Sebastián Cancelliere; Luca Bardelli; Con: Ross Thompson x 4	Preview; Report; Report; Report	Try: Jacopo Trulla x 2 Giovanni Quattrini x 2 Con: Giacomo Ferrari; Tiff Eden x 2 Pen: Giovanni Montemauri

Scotstoun Stadium
Referee: Ruairidh Campbell (SRU)

Glasgow Warriors: 1. Nathan McBeth, 2. Angus Fraser. 3. Lucio Sordoni, 4. Alex Samuel, 5. Euan Ferrie, 6. Gregor Brown, 7. Ally Miller, 8. Henco Venter, 9. Jamie Dobie [captain], 10. Ross Thompson, 11. Kyle Rowe, 12. Tom Jordan, 13. Duncan Munn, 14. Sebastian Cancelliere, 15. Facundo Cordero
Replacements: 16. Corey Tait, 17. Tom Banatvala, 18. Callum Norrie, 19. Ruaraidh Hart, 20. Jonny Morris, 21. Ben Afshar, 22. Duncan Weir, 23. Ben Salmon, 24. Kerr Johnston, 25. Luca Bardelli, 26. Ollie Horne
Zebre: 15. Jacopo Trulla (41), 14. Simone Brisighella (0), 13. Fetuli Paea (0), 12. Enrico Lucchin (55), 11. Simone Gesi (20), 10. Giovanni Montemauri (0), 9. Gonzalo Garcia (2), 8. Giacomo Ferrari [Captain] (7), 7. Bautista Stavile (0), 6. Luca Andreani (29), 5. Leonard Krumov (88), 4. Matteo Canali (0), 3. Juan Pitinari (15), 2. Giampietro Ribaldi (18), 1. Alessio Sanavia (7)
Replacements: 16. Giovanni Quattrini (0), 17. Muhamed Hasa (13), 18. Riccardo Genovese (5), 19. Andrea Zambonin (34), 20. Nicola Piantella (0), 21. Davide Ruggeri (11), 22. Iacopo Bianchi (43), 23. Thomas Dominguez (0), 24. Tiff Eden (17), 25. Franco Smith Jr (14), 26. Ben Cambriani (0)

==== Match 2 ====
7 October 2023
2pm

Ulster (Ireland)	19 - 14	(Scotland) Glasgow Warriors
Try: Dave Ewers; James Hume; Tom Stewart; Con: Jake Flannery x 2	Preview; Report; Report; Report	Try: Jamie Dobie; Gregor Hiddleston; Con: Duncan Weir x 2

Breffni Park
Referee: Ruairidh Campbell (SRU)

Glasgow Warriors: 1. Nathan McBeth, 2. Angus Fraser, 3. Lucio Sordoni, 4. Max Williamson, 5. Alex Samuel, 6. Gregor Brown, 7. Ally Miller, 8. Henco Venter, 9. Jamie Dobie [Captain], 10. Duncan Weir, 11. Kyle Rowe, 12. Tom Jordan, 13. Duncan Munn, 14. Sebastian Cancelliere, 15. Josh McKay
Replacements: 16. Gregor Hiddleston, 17. Oli Kebble, 18. Enrique Pieretto, 19. Ruaraidh Hart, 20. Thomas Gordon, 21. Ben Afshar, 22. Ross Thompson, 23. Facundo Cordero, 24. Corey Tait, 25. Ben Salmon, 26. Kerr Johnston, 27. Ollie Horne
Ulster: Will Addison; Robert Baloucoune, James Hume, Jude Postlethwaite, Jacob Stockdale; Jake Flannery, Nathan Doak; Andrew Warwick, Tom Stewart [Captain], Greg McGrath, Marcus Rea, Kieran Treadwell, Dave Ewers, Matty Rea, David McCann
Replacements: John Andrew, Billy Burns, Ben Carson, Reuben Crothers, Angus Curtis, Cameron Doak, Ben Griffin, Cormac Izuchukwu, Ethan McIlroy, Connor Mckee, Stewart Moore, Ben Moxham, Shea O’Brien, Aaron Sexton, David Shanahan, Harry Sheridan, Nick Timoney

==== Match 3 ====
24 November 2023

Glasgow Warriors 'A' (Scotland)	26 - 27	(Scotland) Edinburgh 'A'
Try: Gregor Hiddleston; Duncan Munn; Kerr Johnston penalty try Con: Ross Thompson x 2	Report; Report; Report	Try: Charlie Shiel; Liam Richman; Ben Muncaster x 2

Scotstoun Stadium

Glasgow Warriors 'A': Allan Dell, Gregor Hiddleston, Enrique Pieretto, Max Williamson, Alex Samuel, Euan Ferrie, Thomas Gordon, Ally Miller (C); Conor McAlpine, Ross Thompson, Logan Trotter, Duncan Munn, Ben Salmon, Luca Bardelli, Jack Blain
Replacements: Grant Stewart, Tom Banatvala, Murphy Walker, Callum Norrie, Callum Smyth, Ruaraidh Hart, Tom Smith, Connor Gordon, Eric Davey, Amena Caqusau, Kerr Johnston
Edinburgh 'A': 15. Harry Paterson, 14. Finn Douglas, 13. Liam Richman, 12. Grant Hughes, 11. Lewis Wells, 10. Cammy Scott, 9. Charlie Shiel, 1. Robin Hislop, 2. Adam McBurney, 3. D’Arcy Rae, 4. Jamie Campbell, 5. Jamie Hodgson (C), 6. Wallace Nelson, 7. Freddy Douglas, 8. Ben Muncaster
Replacements: 16. Paddy Harrison, 17. Robbie Deans, 18. Luan de Bruin, 19. Euan McVie, 20. Jerry Blyth-Lafferty, 21. Finn Burgess,22. Marcus Holden, 23. George Barber

==== Match 4 ====
20 April 2024
3pm

Boroughmuir Bears (Scotland)	26 - 17	(Scotland) Glasgow Warriors 'A'
Try: Scott Robeson x 2 Matt Reid x 2 Con: George Paul x3	Report; Report	Try: Jonny Morris; Callum Smyth; Richie Simpson; Con: Ben Ashfar

Meggetland
Referee: Rob McDowell (SRU)

Boroughmuir Bears: Callum McFeat Smith, Arthur Allen, Marin McGinley, Max Laboda, Jack Fisher [vice], Myles Lowe, Lewis Calder, Liam Habib, Ruairidh Swan, George Paul, Rowan Stewart, Scott Robeson [captain], Ronan Kerr, Matt Reid, Euan Muirhead
Replacements: Corey Tait, Luca Alessandri, Callum MacGregor, Berti Taylor, Ewan Guy, Josh Beveridge, Andrew McLean, Alex Thom
Glasgow Warriors 'A': Tom Banatavula, Angus Fraser, Callum Norrie, Ruaraidh Hart, Harris McLeod, Gregor Brown, Jonny Morris, Jack Mann, Ben Ashfar [captain], Richie Simpson, Logan Trotter, Duncan Munn, Ben Salmon, Aidan Cross, Fergus Watson
Replacements: Fraser Allan, Callum Smyth, Craig Miller, Jonny Ventisei, James Imrie, Matt Urwin, Kerr Yule, Kerr Johnston

==== Match 5 ====
25 May 2024
7.35pm

Ayrshire Bulls (Scotland)	17 - 24	(Scotland) Glasgow Warriors 'A'
Try: Luca Bardelli; Jamie Shedden; Robert Beattie; Con: Fergus Johnston	Report; Report; Report	Try: Jonny Morris; Logan Trotter x 2 Ben Afshar; Con: Richie Simpson; Matthew Urwin

Millbrae
Referee: Finlay Brown (SRU)

Ayrshire Bulls: Marcus Kershaw; Thomas Glendinning, Jamie Shedden, Robert Beattie, Luca Bardelli, David McCartney, Reiss Cullen, Jamie Drummond, James Malcolm, Calvin Henderson, Ed Bloodworth, Rory Jackson, Lewis McNamara, Tim Brown, Blair Macpherson
Replacements: Alex McGuire, Craig Miller, Rhodri Tanner, Oscar Baird, Seth Rae, Fergus Johnston, Chris Elliot, Mason Cullen
Glasgow Warriors 'A': 15 Fergus Watson, 14 Ben Salmon, 13 Duncan Munn, 12 Kerr Yule, 11 Logan Trotter, 10 Richie Simpson, 9 Ben Afshar, 1 Callum Smyth, 2 Angus Fraser, 3 Callum Norrie, 4 Ryan Burke, 5 Sintu Manjezi, 6 Ruaraidh Hart, 7 Jonny Morris, 8 Jack Mann
Replacements: 16 Grant Stewart, 17 Allan Dell, 18 Murphy Walker, 19 David Andrew, 20 Mark McCornick, 21 Sean Kennedy, 22 Matthew Urwin, 23 Amena Caqusau

=== United Rugby Championship ===
Glasgow Warriors hit the ground running with a bonus point victory over Leinster. George Horne became a club centurion from the bench. The first of five away defeats this season in the league came playing Connacht. “We’re not happy with our performance at all.” said Henco Venter.

Scotstoun remained a fortress throughout the league season. Teams came and were conquered, one by one. The most visiting teams could do were to prevent a bonus point victory for Glasgow Warriors. The Stormers, Edinburgh in the first 1872 Cup match, Cardiff and the Sharks managed this feat in the regular season. Every other visiting URC team failed.

The Glasgow Warriors away form was decent but there were 4 other away losses in the league. A defeat by Munster at Thomond Park still left Warriors with a try bonus point. A loss at Murrayfield by Edinburgh couldn't prevent Glasgow taking the 1872 Cup home. And late in the season 2 losses to the Bulls and the Lions at altitude proved costly, although the Warriors got close to the Bulls; winning the second half and getting 2 bonus points in the loss.

Glasgow Warriors were looking handsome at the top of the league before those away South African losses. At the end of the regular season, those losses meant the chasing teams caught up with Glasgow, despite the Warriors winning a bonus point victory against Zebre in the final match. Instead of finishing first, the Glasgow Warriors finished fourth in a congested top 4. Only 3 points stood between Munster in first and Glasgow in fourth.

Finishing fourth meant a home quarter final against Stormers. Like before in the season, the visiting South Africans were dispatched; aided in this by Manie Libbok's poor kicking in windy conditions. This set up an away semi-final at Thomond Park. Munster advertising a home final at Thomond Park between them and the Bulls before the match gave Glasgow extra incentive to win. This was a match that Glasgow out-fought Munster and they were deserved winners with tries by Kyle Steyn and Sebastian Cancelliere.

The final against the Bulls at their home in Loftus Versfeld Stadium in Pretoria was at 1350 metres above sea level. It was difficult for the Warriors to book flights for everyone in the squad together in such short notice, so parties were split into batches and travelled at different days. It also meant that very few of the Warrior Nation could travel to Pretoria for the final, and the stadium was almost sold out by expectant Bulls fans. However Franco Smith promised no excuses for the team. The Bulls at their home were heavy favourites and bookmakers gave Glasgow long odds for winning.

In the match, Glasgow matched the Bulls physicality in the first half, and outshone them in the second half. The Bulls raced to a 13–0 lead before the Warriors converted a try by Scott Cummings at the end of the half. And like the last match against the Bulls, Glasgow Warriors knew that they could win the second half. Tries followed by George Turner and Huw Jones. The Bulls could only score a further penalty in the entire game. A controversial disallowed try from Jack Dempsey gave the Bulls a chink of hope at the end of the game. Glasgow's defence was stout and despite Tom Jordan being yellow carded two minutes from time, the Warriors held out for a famous victory by 21 points to 16.

==== League table ====
2023–24 United Rugby Championship
	Team	P	W	D	L	PF	PA	PD	TF	TA	TB	LB	Pts
1	(Ireland) Munster	18	13	1	4	483	318	+165	65	38	11	3	68
2	(South Africa) Bulls (RU)	18	13	0	5	639	433	+206	85	54	11	3	66
3	(Ireland) Leinster	18	13	0	5	554	350	+204	81	43	11	2	65
4	(Scotland) Glasgow Warriors (CH)	18	13	0	5	519	353	+166	76	35	11	2	65
5	(South Africa) Stormers	18	12	0	6	468	348	+120	58	45	7	4	59
6	(Ireland) Ulster	18	11	0	7	437	409	+28	53	55	5	5	54
7	(Italy) Benetton	18	11	1	6	411	400	+11	51	56	6	2	54
8	(Wales) Ospreys	18	10	0	8	414	449	–35	53	53	8	2	50
9	(South Africa) Lions	18	9	0	9	526	398	+128	67	50	8	6	50
10	(Scotland) Edinburgh	18	11	0	7	416	397	+19	47	52	3	2	49
11	(Ireland) Connacht	18	9	0	9	404	432	–28	51	57	4	5	45
12	(Wales) Cardiff	18	4	1	13	384	410	–26	50	51	4	10	32
13	(Wales) Scarlets	18	5	0	13	313	575	–262	37	77	4	3	27
14	(South Africa) Sharks	18	4	0	14	343	431	–88	47	55	3	6	25
15	(Wales) Dragons	18	3	0	15	300	611	–311	36	84	1	3	16
16	(Italy) Zebre Parma	18	1	1	16	345	643	–298	42	94	4	5	15
If teams are level at any stage, tiebreakers are applied in the following order: 1. number of matches won; 2. the difference between points for and points against; 3. the number of tries scored; 4. the most points scored; 5. the difference between tries for and tries against; 6. the fewest red cards received; 7. the fewest yellow cards received.
Green background indicates teams that are in play-off places and earn a place in the 2024–25 European Champions Cup Pink background indicates teams that are in play-off places and earn a place in the 2024–25 European Challenge Cup; Yellow background indicates the team that won the 2023–24 European Challenge Cup and thus qualify for the 2024–25 European Champions Cup, but are not in a play-off place Plain background indicates teams that earn a place in the 2024–25 European Challenge Cup. Q: qualified for play-offs. H: home field advantage secured for quarter-and semi-final. h: home field advantage secured for quarter-final X: cannot reach play-offs. E: qualified for Champions Cup.

==== Results ====
===== Round 1 =====
22 October 2023
4pm

(1 BP) Glasgow Warriors (Scotland)	43–25	(Ireland) Leinster
Try: Josh McKay; Sebastián Cancelliere; Huw Jones; Angus Fraser; George Horne; Johnny Matthews; Penalty try Con: Tom Jordan x 2 George Horne	Preview; Report; Report; Report	Try: Jack Boyle; Lee Barron; Tommy O'Brien; Con: Harry Byrne x 2 Pen: Harry Byrne x 2

Scotstoun Stadium
Attendance: 6,221
Referee: Craig Evans (WRU)

===== Round 2 =====
28 October 2023
3pm

Connacht (Ireland)	34 - 26	(Scotland) Glasgow Warriors (1BP)
Try: Diarmuid Kilgallen x 2 Dylan Tierney-Martin; Con: Cathal Fordex 2 Pen: JJ Hanrahan x 3 Cathal Forde x 2	Preview; Report; Report; Report	Try: Kyle Rowe; Penalty Try; Tom Jordan; Jamie Dobie; Con: Tom Jordan x 2

The Sportsground
Attendance: 4,109
Referee: Adam Jones (WRU)

===== Round 3 =====
3 November 2023
7.35pm

Glasgow Warriors (Scotland)	20 - 9	(South Africa) Stormers
Try: Sione Tuipulotu; Johnny Matthews x 2 Con: George Horne; Pen: George Horne	Preview; Report; Report; Report	Pen: Sacha Feinberg-Mngomezulu x 3

Scotstoun Stadium
Attendance: 6,191
Referee: Chris Busby (IRFU)

===== Round 4 =====
11 November 2023
5.15pm

Ospreys (Wales)	23 - 31	(Scotland) Glasgow Warriors (1BP)
Try: Keiran Williams; Reuben Morgan-Williams; Con: Jack Walsh x 2 Pen: Jack Walsh x 3	Preview; Report; Report; Report	Try: Johnny Matthews x 2 Sione Vailanu; Allan Dell; Con: Duncan Weir x 4 Pen: Duncan Weir

Swansea.com Stadium
Attendance: 4,355
Referee: Andrea Piardi (FIR)

===== Round 5 =====
18 November 2023
7.35pm

(1BP) Glasgow Warriors (Scotland)	26 - 12	(Italy) Benetton
Try: Josh McKay; Kyle Rowe; Sebastián Cancelliere; George Horne; Con: George Horne x 3	Preview; Report; Report; Report	Pen: Tomás Albornoz x 3 Jacob Umaga

Scotstoun Stadium
Attendance: 5,685
Referee: Andrew Brace (IRFU)

===== Round 6 =====
25 November 2023
7.35pm

(1BP) Glasgow Warriors (Scotland)	33 - 20	(Ireland) Ulster
Try: Sean Kennedy; George Turner; Kyle Rowe; Johnny Matthews x 2 Con: Tom Jordan x 4	Preview; Report; Report; Report	Try: Tom Stewart; John Cooney; Con: John Cooney x 2 Pen: John Cooney; Nathan Doak

Scotstoun Stadium
Attendance: 7,216
Referee: Ben Whitehouse (WRU)

===== Round 7 =====
1 December 2023
7.35pm

(1BP) Munster (Ireland)	40 - 29	(Scotland) Glasgow Warriors (1BP)
Try: Edwin Edogbo; Thomas Ahern x 2 Diarmuid Barron; Alex Nankivell; John Hodnett; Con: Jack Crowley x 5	Preview; Report; Report; Report	Try: Sione Vailanu; Johnny Matthews; Rory Darge; Penalty try Angus Fraser; Con: Duncan Weir

Musgrave Park
Attendance: 8, 400
Referee: Marius van der Westhuizen (SARU)

===== Round 8 – 1872 Cup 1st Leg =====
22 December 2023
7.35pm

Glasgow Warriors (Scotland)	22 - 10	(Scotland) Edinburgh
Try: Kyle Rowe; Johnny Matthews; Ally Miller; Con: George Horne x 2 Pen: Ross Thompson	Preview; Report; Report; Report	Try: WP Nel; Con: Ben Healy; Pen: Ben Healy

Scotstoun Stadium
Attendance: 7,172
Referee: Sam Grove-White (SRU)

===== Round 9 - 1872 Cup 2nd Leg =====
30 December 2022
3pm

Edinburgh (Scotland)	19 - 14	(Scotland) Glasgow Warriors (1BP)
Try: Matt Currie; Duhan van der Merwe; Pen: Ben Healy x 3	Preview; Report; Report; Report	Try: Johnny Matthews; Stafford McDowall; Con: George Horne

Murrayfield Stadium
Attendance: 37,881
Referee: Mike Adamson (SRU)

===== Round 10 =====
17 February 2023
7.35pm

(1BP) Glasgow Warriors (Scotland)	40 - 7	(Wales) Dragons
Try: Josh McKay; Stafford McDowall x 2 Ben Afshar; Facundo Cordero; Con: Ross Thompson x 4 Duncan Weir	Preview; Report; Report; Report	Try: Will Reed; Con: Angus O'Brien

Scotstoun Stadium
Attendance: 7,260
Referee: Andrew Brace (IRFU)

===== Round 11 =====
2 March 2023
4pm

Benetton (Italy)	9 - 19	(Scotland) Glasgow Warriors
Pen: Jacob Umaga x 3	Preview; Report; Report; Report	Try: Johnny Matthews; Stafford McDowall; Tom Jordan; Con: Ross Thompson; Duncan Weir

Stadio Comunale di Monigo
Attendance: 5,000
Referee: Eoghan Cross (IRFU)

===== Round 12 =====
22 March 2023
7.35pm

Glasgow Warriors (Scotland)	17 - 13	(Wales) Cardiff (1BP)
Try: Max Williamson; Lucio Sordoni; Con: Duncan Weir; Pen: Duncan Weir	Preview; Report; Report; Report	Try: Ben Thomas; Con: Tinus de Beer; Pen: Tinus de Beer x 2

Scotstoun Stadium
Attendance: 6,849
Referee: Frank Murphy (IRFU)

===== Round 13 =====
30 March 2023
7.35pm

Scarlets (Wales)	3 - 45	(Scotland) Glasgow Warriors (1BP)
Pen: Ioan Lloyd	Preview; Report; Report; Report	Try: Kyle Rowe x 3 Gregor Hiddleston; Scott Cummings; Penalty try Johnny Matthews; Con: Duncan Weir x 4

Parc y Scarlets
Referee: Gianluca Gnecchi (FIR)

===== Round 14 =====
19 April 2024
7.35pm

Glasgow Warriors (Scotland)	21 – 10	(South Africa) Sharks
Try: George Horne; Max Williamson; Kyle Steyn; Con: George Horne x 3	Preview; Report; Report; Report	Try: Dan Jooste; Ntuthuko Mchunu

Scotstoun Stadium
Attendance: 7,216
Referee: Federico Vedovelli

===== Round 15 =====
27 April 2024
2pm

Zebre (Italy)	9 – 40	(Scotland) Glasgow Warriors (1 BP)
Pen: Thomas Dominguez x 3	Preview; Report; Report; Report	Try: Gregor Hiddleston x 2 Kyle Steyn x 2 Jamie Dobie; George Horne; Con: Ross Thompson x 5

Stadio Sergio Lanfranchi
Attendance: 2,500
Referee: Eoghan Cross

===== Round 16 =====
11 May 2024
2pm

(1 BP) Bulls (South Africa)	40 – 34	(Scotland) Glasgow Warriors (2 BP)
Try: Akker van der Merwe; Cameron Hanekom; Elrigh Louw; Canan Moodie; Con: Chris Smith x 4 Pen: Chris Smith x 4	Preview; Report; Report; Report	Try: Matt Fagerson; Kyle Steyn; Sebastián Cancelliere; Duncan Weir; Con: George Horne; Tom Jordan; Duncan Weir x 2 Pen: George Horne; Duncan Weir

Loftus Versfeld Stadium, Pretoria
Attendance: 10,006
Referee: Ben Whitehouse (WRU)

===== Round 17 =====
18 May 2024
4.05pm

(1 BP) Lions (South Africa)	44 – 21	(Scotland) Glasgow Warriors
Try: Rabz Maxwane x 2 Edwill van der Merwe; JC Pretorius; Sanele Nohamba; Hanru Sirgel; Con: Sanele Nohamba x 4 Pen: Jordan Hendrikse; Sanele Nohamba	Preview; Report report Report	Try: Kyle Rowe; Euan Ferrie; Josh McKay; Con: George Horne x 2 Duncan Weir

Ellis Park Stadium, Johannesburg
Attendance: 6,672
Referee: Craig Evans (WRU)

===== Round 18 =====
31 May 2024
7.35pm

(1 BP) Glasgow Warriors (Scotland)	38 – 26	(Italy) Zebre Parma
Try: Jamie Bhatti; Jonny Matthews x 2 Kyle Rowe; Sebastián Cancelliere; Tom Jordan; Con: Duncan Weir; George Horne x 3	Preview; Report; Report; Report	Try: Giovanni Montemauri; Bautista Stavile; Con: Giovanni Montemauri x 2 Pen: Giovanni Montemauri x 3 Jacopo Trulla

Scotstoun Stadium, Glasgow
Attendance: 7,246
Referee: Peter Martin (IRFU)

===== Play-offs =====
====== Quarter-final ======
8 June 2024
7.35pm

(4) Glasgow Warriors (Scotland)	27 – 10	(South Africa) Stormers (5)
Try: Sebastián Cancelliere; Henco Venter; Ross Thompson; Con: George Horne x 3 Pen: George Horne x 2	Preview; Report; Report; Report	Try: Ben Loader; Paul de Wet

Scotstoun Stadium, Glasgow
Attendance: 5,879
Referee: Chris Busby (IRFU)

====== Semi-final ======
15 June 2024
6pm

(1) Munster (Ireland)	10 – 17	(Scotland) Glasgow Warriors (4)
Try: Antoine Frisch; Con: Jack Crowley; Pen: Jack Crowley	Preview; Report; Report; Report	Try: Kyle Steyn; Sebastián Cancelliere; Con: George Horne x 2 Pen: George Horne

Thomond Park, Limerick
Attendance: 20,052
Referee: Andrea Piardi (FIR)

====== Final ======
22 June 2024
5pm

(2) Bulls (South Africa)	16 - 21	(Scotland) Glasgow Warriors (4)
Try: Marco van Staden; Con: Johan Goosen; Pen: Johan Goosen x 3	Preview; Report; Report; Report	Try: Scott Cummings; George Turner; Huw Jones; Con: George Horne x 3

Loftus Versfeld Stadium, Pretoria
Attendance: 50,388
Referee: Andrea Piardi (FIR)

=== European Champions Cup ===
The format of the Champions Cup changed for the 2023–24 season. There is to be four pools of six teams. Each pool of six will have 2 URC sides, 2 French sides and 2 English sides. However, in the pool stage, no teams from the same league play one another. This meant that Glasgow Warriors will play only the French and English sides in their pool.

The draw was announced on 21 June 2023. Glasgow Warriors are in Pool 3 along with Munster, Toulon, Bayonne, Exeter Chiefs and Northampton Saints.

==== Pool 3 table ====
2023–24 European Rugby Champions Cup Pool C
Team	P	W	D	L	PF	PA	Diff	TF	TA	TB	LB	Pts
(England) Northampton Saints (3)	4	4	0	0	137	75	+62	18	10	2	0	18
(England) Exeter Chiefs (8)	4	3	0	1	87	99	–12	13	14	1	0	13
(Scotland) Glasgow Warriors (12)	4	2	0	2	77	63	+14	12	8	1	1	10
(Ireland) Munster (14)	4	1	1	2	93	93	0	13	10	2	1	9
(France) Bayonne (9CC)	4	1	1	2	82	107	–25	11	16	1	1	8
(France) Toulon	4	0	0	4	60	99	–39	7	16	0	2	2
Green background (rows 1 to 2) indicates qualification places for a home Champions Cup round of 16. Blue background (rows 3 to 4) indicates other teams qualified for the Champions Cup round of 16. Yellow background (row 5) indicates qualification place for the Challenge Cup round of 16. Plain background (row 6) indicates elimination from 2023–24 European competition. Starting table — source: European Professional Club Rugby

==== Results ====
===== Round 1 =====
8 December 2023
8pm

Glasgow Warriors (Scotland)	19 – 28	(England) Northampton Saints
Try: Sebastián Cancelliere; Ollie Smith; Penalty try Con: Ross Thompson	Preview; Report; Report; Report	Try: Courtney Lawes; Tommy Freeman x 2 Con: Fin Smith x 2 Pen: Fin Smith x 3

Scotstoun Stadium, Glasgow
Attendance: 6,579
Referee: Luc Ramos (France)

===== Round 2 =====
15 December 2023
9pm

(1 BP) Bayonne (France)	11 – 12	(Scotland) Glasgow Warriors
Try: Facundo Bosch; Pen: Camille Lopez x 2	Preview; Report; Report; Report	Try: Ally Miller; Josh McKay; Con: Ross Thompson

Stade Jean-Dauger, Bayonne
Attendance: 13,507
Referee: Adam Leal (England)

===== Round 3 =====
13 January 2024
1pm

Exeter Chiefs (England)	19 – 17	(Scotland) Glasgow Warriors (1 BP)
Try: Jacques Vermeulen; Dan Frost; Zack Wimbush; Con: Henry Slade x 2	Preview; Report; Report; Report	Try: Kyle Rowe; Sione Tuipulotu; Con: Duncan Weir x 2 Pen: George Horne

Sandy Park, Exeter
Attendance: 12,155
Referee: Pierre Brousset (France)

===== Round 4 =====
19 January 2024
8pm

(1 BP) Glasgow Warriors (Scotland)	29 – 5	(France) Toulon
Try: Kyle Rowe x 2 Huw Jones x 2 Josh McKay; Con: George Horne x 2	Preview; Report; Report; Report	Try: Gaël Dréan

Scotstoun Stadium, Glasgow
Attendance: 7,216
Referee: Matthew Carley (England)

==== Round of 16 ====
5 April 2024
8pm

Harlequins (England)	28–24	(Scotland) Glasgow Warriors
Try: André Esterhuizen; Marcus Smith; Cadan Murley; Sam Riley; Con: Marcus Smith x 4	Preview; Report; Report; Report	Try: Scott Cummings; Johnny Matthews; George Horne; Con: George Horne x 3 Pen: George Horne

Twickenham Stoop, London
Attendance: 12,852
Referee: Tual Trainini (France)

== Warrior of the month awards ==
Award	Winner
September	(Scotland) Euan Ferrie
October	(Scotland) Angus Fraser
November	(Scotland) Stafford McDowall
December	(Scotland) Ally Miller
January	(Scotland) Kyle Rowe
February	(Scotland) Euan Ferrie
March	(South Africa) Henco Venter
April	(Scotland) Kyle Steyn
May	(Scotland) Rory Darge

== End of Season awards ==
=== Men ===
Award	Winner
Breakthrough Player of the Season	(Scotland) Max Williamson
Coaches Award	(New Zealand) Tom Jordan
Test Player of the Season	(Scotland) Zander Fagerson
Most Improved Player of the Season	(Scotland) Euan Ferrie
Leadership Award	(Scotland) Stafford McDowall
Community Hero of the Year	Colin Dalgarno Strathaven
Try of the Season	(Scotland) Duncan Weir vs. (South Africa) Bulls
Players' Player of the Season	(Scotland) Stafford McDowall
Player of the Season	(New Zealand) Josh McKay

=== Women ===
Award	Winner
Coaches Player of the Season	(Scotland) Holland Bogan
Players' Player of the Season	(Scotland) Ailie Tucker

== Competitive debuts this season ==
A player's nationality shown is taken from the nationality at the highest honour for the national side obtained; or if never capped internationally their place of birth. Senior caps take precedence over junior caps or place of birth; junior caps take precedence over place of birth. A player's nationality at debut may be different from the nationality shown. Combination sides like the British and Irish Lions or Pacific Islanders are not national sides, or nationalities.

Players in BOLD font have been capped by their senior international XV side as nationality shown.

Players in Italic font have capped either by their international 7s side; or by the international XV 'A' side as nationality shown.

Players in normal font have not been capped at senior level.

A position in parentheses indicates that the player debuted as a substitute. A player may have made a prior debut for Glasgow Warriors in a non-competitive match, 'A' match or 7s match; these matches are not listed.

Tournaments where competitive debut made:

**Scottish Inter-District Championship**	**Welsh–Scottish League**	**WRU Challenge Cup**	**Celtic League**	**Celtic Cup**	**1872 Cup**	**Pro12**	**Pro14**	**Rainbow Cup**	**United Rugby Championship**	**European Challenge Cup**	**Heineken Cup / European Champions Cup**

Crosshatching indicates a jointly hosted match.

Number	Player nationality	Name	Position	Date of debut	Venue	Stadium	Opposition nationality	Opposition side	Tournament	Match result	Scoring debut
353	(South Africa)	Henco Venter	Flanker	2023-10-21	Home	Scotstoun Stadium	(Ireland)	Leinster	United Rugby Championship	Win	Nil
354	(Scotland)	**Kyle Rowe**	Wing	2023-10-28	Away	The Sportsground	(Ireland)	Connacht	United Rugby Championship	Loss	5 pts
355	(Scotland)	Max Williamson	(Lock)	2023-11-18	Home	Scotstoun Stadium	(Italy)	Benetton	United Rugby Championship	Win	Nil
356	(Scotland)	Ben Afshar	(Scrum Half)	2023-11-25	Home	Scotstoun Stadium	(Ireland)	Ulster	United Rugby Championship	Win	Nil
357	(Scotland)	Gregor Hiddleston	Hooker	2024-01-13	Away	Sandy Park	(England)	Exeter Chiefs	European Champions Cup	Loss	Nil
358	(Argentina)	**Facundo Cordero**	Wing	2024-02-17	Home	Scotstoun Stadium	(Wales)	Dragons	United Rugby Championship	Win	5pts
359	(Scotland)	Ruaraidh Hart	(Flanker)	2024-02-17	Home	Scotstoun Stadium	(Wales)	Dragons	United Rugby Championship	Win	Nil
360	(Scotland)	Duncan Munn	(Centre)	2024-03-22	Home	Scotstoun Stadium	(Wales)	Cardiff Rugby	United Rugby Championship	Win	Nil

== Sponsorship ==
- SP Energy Networks – Title Sponsor and Community Sponsor
- Scottish Power – Official Kit

=== Official kit supplier ===
- Macron

=== Official kit sponsors ===
- Malcolm Group
- McCrea Financial Services
- Denholm Oilfield
- Ross Hall Hospital
- Story Contracting
- Leidos

=== Official sponsors ===
- The Famous Grouse
- Clyde Travel Management
- Harper Macleod
- Caledonia Best
- Eden Mill Brewery and Distillery
- David Lloyd Leisure
- Crabbie's
- Cala Homes
- Capital Solutions
- Martha's Restaurant
- Sterling Furniture

=== Official partners ===
- A.G. Barr
- Benchmarx
- Black & Lizars
- Cameron House
- Glasgow Airport
- Healthspan Elite
- KubeNet
- Mentholatum
- MSC Nutrition
- Smile Plus
- Lenco Utilities
- Scot JCB News Scotland
- HF Group
- Primestaff
- Village Hotel Club
- The Crafty Pig
- Kooltech
- Savills
- iPro Sports
- RHA
