= 2026–27 Edinburgh Rugby season =

Edinburgh Rugby
- 2026–27 season
- CEO: Douglas Struth
- Captain: Magnus Bradbury

The 2026–27 season is Edinburgh Rugby's sixth season in the United Rugby Championship, and 26th in all formats of the competition. Along with competing in the URC and its Scottish-Italian Shield competition, the club will also participate in the 2026–27 EPCR Challenge Cup and the 1872 Cup against Glasgow Warriors.

== Squad and management ==
=== Management and coaching team ===
Sean Everitt will continue as head coach for Edinburgh in the new season. The senior coaching team is as follows:

Coach	Role
Sean Everitt	Head coach
Robert Chrystie	Assistant skills coach
Steven Lawrie	Forwards coach
Michael Todd	Defence coach
Scott Mathie	Attack and backs coach

=== Players in ===
- (New Zealand) Riley Higgins from (New Zealand) Hurricanes
- (Scotland) Hector Patterson (promoted from Academy)
- (Scotland) Geordie Gwynn from (England) Ealing Trailfinders
- (New Zealand) Louie Chapman from (New Zealand) Crusaders
- (Scotland) Jack Brown (promoted from Academy)
- (Scotland) Jerry Blyth-Lafferty (promoted from Academy)
- (Scotland) Alec Hepburn from (Wales) Scarlets
- (England) James Grayson from (Japan) Mitsubishi Sagamihara DynaBoars
- (Scotland) Ollie Duncan (promoted from Academy)
- (Scotland) Euan McVie (promoted from Academy)
- (New Zealand) Kienan Higgins from (United States) New England Free Jacks

=== Players out ===
- (South Africa) Boan Venter to (South Africa) Lions
- (Scotland) Mikey Jones (released)
- (Scotland) Ross McCann (released)
- (Scotland) Sam Skinner (released)
- (Scotland) Ben Healy to (France) La Rochelle
- (Scotland) Hamish Watson to (France) Castres
- (New Zealand) Angus Williams to (England) Doncaster Knights
- (Scotland) James Lang to (England) Harlequins
- (Scotland) Charlie Shiel to (France) Biarritz

== United Rugby Championship ==
=== Matches ===
Edinburgh Rugby will begin their sixth URC campaign away to Ulster.

25 September	(2 BP) Ulster (Ireland)	29–34	(Scotland) Edinburgh (1 BP)	Ravenhill Stadium, Belfast
	Try: Lowry 26' m Z Ward 57' c McCann 61' c Knox 64' c Con: Murphy (3/4) 58', 62', 65'; Pen: Murphy 75'	Report; Scorecard; Highlights	Try: Douglas 20' c Satala 39' c H Patterson 42' c O'Conor 48' c Con: Grayson (4/4) 21', 40', 43', 49'; Pen: Grayson (2) 24', 28'	Attendance: 11,705

2 October	Edinburgh (Scotland)	17–13	(South Africa) Stormers (1 BP)	Edinburgh Rugby Stadium
	Try: Hill 58' c McHaffie 71' c Con: Grayson (2/2) 59', 72'; Pen: Grayson 6'; Cards: Douglas (yellow card) 63'	Report; Scorecard; Highlights	Try: Dayimani 66' c Con: Ahmed (1/1) 67'; Pen: Ahmed (2) 48', 51'; Cards: Senatla (yellow card) 58'	Attendance: 6,652; Referee: Eoghan Cross (Ireland)

10 October	Zebre (Italy)	12–29	(Scotland) Edinburgh (1 BP)	Stadio Sergio Lanfranchi
	Try: Fusco 12' m Ferrari 72' c Con: Allan (1/2) 72'; Cards: Fusco (yellow card) 36'	Report; Scorecard; Highlights	Try: M Currie 30' c Douglas 37' m Bradbury 56' c T Currie 80' c Con: Grayson (3/4) 30', 56', 81'; Pen: Grayson 6'; Cards: Satala-Navlivou (yellow card) 8'; Morris (yellow card) 61'	Attendance: 2,305; Referee: Adam Jones (Wales)

23 October	(1 BP) Edinburgh (Scotland)	31–10	(South Africa) Lions	Edinburgh Rugby Stadium
	Try: Currie 20' m Tuipulotu 47' c Patterson (2) 51' c, 65' m Gwynn 74' c Con: Grayson (2/4) 48', 52'; Scott (1/1) 75'	Report; Scorecard; Highlights	Try: Hlekani 57' c Con: C Smith (1/1) 58'; Pen: C Smith 34'	Attendance: 6,377; Referee: Peter Martin (Ireland)

31 October 2026	Benetton (Italy)	v	(Scotland) Edinburgh	Stadio Monigo, Treviso

4 December 2026	Edinburgh (Scotland)	v	(Wales) Dragons	Edinburgh Rugby Stadium

19 December 2026	Connacht (Ireland)	v	(Scotland) Edinburgh	The Sportsground, Galway

27 December 2026	Edinburgh (Scotland)	v	(Scotland) Glasgow Warriors	Murrayfield Stadium, Edinburgh

2 January 2027	Edinburgh (Scotland)	v	(Italy) Benetton	Edinburgh Rugby Stadium

23 January 2027	Ospreys (Wales)	v	(Scotland) Edinburgh	St Helen's, Swansea

30 January 2027	Scarlets (Wales)	v	(Scotland) Edinburgh	Parc y Scarlets, Llanelli

27 February 2027	Edinburgh (Scotland)	v	(Ireland) Leinster	Edinburgh Rugby Stadium

19 March 2027	Sharks (South Africa)	v	(Scotland) Edinburgh	Kings Park Stadium, Durban

27 March 2027	Bulls (South Africa)	v	(Scotland) Edinburgh	Loftus Versfeld, Pretoria

16 April 2027	Edinburgh (Scotland)	v	(Wales) Cardiff	Edinburgh Rugby Stadium

24 April 2027	Glasgow Warriors (Scotland)	v	(Scotland) Edinburgh	Hampden Park

7 May 2027	Edinburgh (Scotland)	v	(Italy) Zebre Parma	Edinburgh Rugby Stadium

14 May 2027	Edinburgh (Scotland)	v	(Ireland) Munster	Edinburgh Rugby Stadium

=== Standings ===
Pos	Team	Pld	W	D	L	PF	PA	PD	TF	TA	TB	LB	Pts	Qualification
1	Glasgow Warriors	5	4	1	0	148	112	+36	22	15	5	0	23	Qualification for the Champions Cup and knockout stage
2	Bulls	5	4	0	1	214	106	+108	31	15	4	1	21	Qualification for the Champions Cup and knockout stage
3	Stormers	5	4	0	1	166	101	+65	24	14	4	1	21	Qualification for the Champions Cup and knockout stage
4	Sharks	5	4	0	1	140	107	+33	20	16	3	0	19	Qualification for the Champions Cup and knockout stage
5	Edinburgh	5	4	0	1	123	95	+28	17	12	3	0	19	Qualification for the Champions Cup and knockout stage
6	Leinster	5	3	0	2	149	81	+68	23	11	4	2	18	Qualification for the Champions Cup and knockout stage
7	Cardiff	5	3	0	2	113	107	+6	17	17	2	0	14	Qualification for the Champions Cup and knockout stage
8	Dragons	5	2	1	2	137	128	+9	20	20	3	1	14	Qualification for the Champions Cup and knockout stage
9	Ospreys	5	2	0	3	112	147	−35	18	21	3	0	11	Qualification for the Challenge Cup
10	Benetton	5	1	1	3	115	104	+11	16	17	2	3	11	Qualification for the Challenge Cup
11	Connacht	5	2	0	3	109	161	−52	18	24	2	0	10	Qualification for the Challenge Cup
12	Munster	5	1	1	3	93	113	−20	12	17	2	2	10	Qualification for the Challenge Cup
13	Lions	5	2	0	3	107	162	−55	15	25	1	0	9	Qualification for the Challenge Cup
14	Scarlets	5	1	0	4	134	191	−57	20	29	4	1	9	Qualification for the Challenge Cup
15	Ulster	5	0	2	3	121	160	−39	18	22	4	1	9	Qualification for the Challenge Cup
16	Zebre	5	0	0	5	93	199	−106	14	30	2	0	2	Qualification for the Challenge Cup

Updated to match(es) played on 2nd November 2026. Source: UnitedRugby.com
Rules for classification: Tiebreakers for teams tied on points: 1) Number of matches won 2) The difference between points for and points against 3) The number of tries scored 4) The most points scored 5) The difference between tries for and tries against 6) The fewest red cards received 7) The fewest yellow cards received.

=== URC Scottish–Italian Shield ===
Edinburgh Rugby enter the URC Scottish Italian Shield seeking their first trophy since 2022.

2026–27 United Rugby Championship Regional Shield tables
(Italy) (Scotland) Italian x Scottish Shield
	Team	P	W	D	L	PF	PA	PD	TF	TA	TBP	LBP	Pts	Pos overall
1	(Italy) Benetton	2	1	0	1	51	36	+15	6	6	1	1	6	10
2	(Scotland) Glasgow Warriors	1	1	0	0	24	20	+4	4	2	1	0	5	1
3	(Scotland) Edinburgh	2	1	0	1	41	43	–2	6	6	1	0	5	5
4	(Italy) Zebre Parma	1	0	0	1	12	29	–17	2	4	0	0	0	16
If teams are level at any stage, tiebreakers are applied in the following order: 1. number of matches won 2. the difference between points for and points against 3. the number of tries scored 4. the most points scored 5. the difference between tries for and tries against 6. the fewest red cards received 7. the fewest yellow cards received
Green background indicates teams currently leading the regional shield. Upon the conclusion of the regular season, these teams win their respective regional shields. (S) : URC Shield champion

== EPCR Challenge Cup ==
Having finished outside the top eight of the 2025–26 United Rugby Championship, Edinburgh qualified for the 2026–27 EPCR Challenge Cup. The pool stage draw will take place on 1 July 2026.
