= Freddy Douglas =

Scotland international rugby union player

- Born: 14 May 2005 (age 21)
- Height: 1.85 m (6 ft 1 in)
- Weight: 100 kg (220 lb)
- School: Stewart's Melville College

Rugby union career
- Position: Flanker
- Current team: Edinburgh
Senior career
Years	Team	Apps	(Points)
2023–	Edinburgh	30	(1)
International career
Years	Team	Apps	(Points)
2024	Scotland U20	12	(7)
2024–	Scotland	3	(0)
2024–	Scotland A	3	(0)

Freddy Douglas is a Scotland international rugby union player who plays in the back row for Edinburgh Rugby.

== Early life ==
He grew up in a rugby family, with both his Irish and Scottish sides playing rugby. He has an older brother who was also a rugby player for Scotland U18's. He was educated at Stewart's Melville College in Edinburgh.

== Club career ==
He joined the professional academy at Edinburgh Rugby ahead of the 2023-24 season. He made his Edinburgh debut against Benetton Rugby on 30 November 2024. Shortly afterwards, he signed his first professional contract with the club.

== International career ==
He was part of the Scotland U20 team which won the World Rugby U20 Trophy in the summer of 2024. In October 2024, he was called-up to the senior Scotland national rugby union team for the first time under head coach Gregor Townsend. He made his senior debut as a second-half replacement in Scotland's autumn international match against Portugal on 16 November 2024. In doing so, he became the youngest man to represent Scotland since Donald White in 1963.

He played for Scotland 'A' on 6 February 2026 in their match against Italy XV.
