= Anthony Rogers (actor) =

Scottish actor

Anthony Rogers is a Scottish actor known for his role as Sir Dinadan in Camelot (1967).

== Biography ==
Anthony Rogers was born in the Scottish town of Hamilton and attended the Queen Victoria School in Dunblane. Then for six years he was with the British Merchant Marine during which he made a trip to California. After the Merchant Marine he moved to Florida and became an instructor in water sports.

== Career ==
He began his acting career in Florida where he joined Hollywood Little Theater. After which he went to New York City and trained at HB Studio. In 1965 he moved to California and appeared in the WWII drama Combat! in the fourth season episode "Evasion" as Lt. Maples (1965). Roles in movies followed: Howard Hawks used him twice in supporting roles, as doomed racing driver Jim Loomis in Red Line 7000 (1965) and Dr. Charles Donovan in El Dorado (1967). He then had his most high-profile role, that of Sir Dinadan in the film version of Camelot (1967).

== James Bond ==
In 1967 LIFE Magazine sent photographer Loomis Dean to casting sessions for the James Bond movie, On Her Majesty's Secret Service (1969). In the 11 October 1968 edition of the magazine Rogers was shown to be one of five candidates (the others being George Lazenby, John Richardson, Hans De Vries and Robert Campbell) auditioning for the role of James Bond, eventually losing out to Lazenby.
