= Jack Brown (rugby union) =

Scottish rugby union player (born 2005)

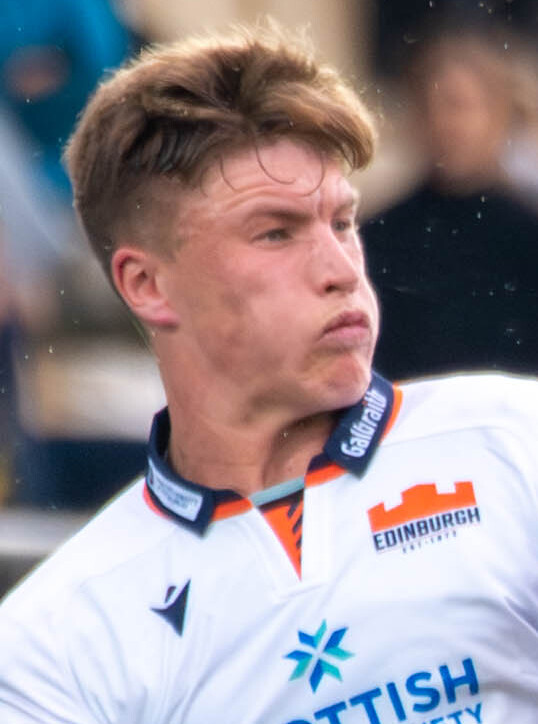
- Born: 18 June 2005 (age 21) Livingston, Scotland
- Height: 1.88 m (6 ft 2 in)
- Weight: 94 kg (14 st 11 lb)
- School: George Watson's College

Rugby union career
- Position: Fullback/Winger
- Current team: Edinburgh Rugby
Youth career
- -: Edinburgh Rugby U18
- –: George Watson's College
Senior career
Years	Team	Apps	(Points)
2023	Watsonian FC	3	
2024–	Edinburgh Rugby	3	(0)
- Correct as of 22 April 2025
International career
Years	Team	Apps	(Points)
2024-2025	Scotland U20	6	(15)
2024	Scotland A	1	(0)
- Correct as of 22 April 2025

Jack Brown (born 18 June 2005) is a Scottish rugby union player who plays as a full back or winger for Edinburgh Rugby in the United Rugby Championship.

== Early career ==
Brown began playing rugby in primary 3 while attending George Watson's College and eventually went on to play for the school's first xv between 2021 and 2023, which led to him being picked up by the Scottish rugby youth pathway and becoming part of the Edinburgh Rugby academy. He gained recognition for his performances at age-grade level, leading to national selection at under-18s and under-20s.

== Professional career ==
Brown made his debut for Edinburgh Rugby in the 2024–25 season, making his debut in a EPCR Challenge Cup Match against the Bulls. Jack then made his debut in the United Rugby Championship a week later against the Sharks.

== International career ==
In 2024, Jack made his Scotland U20 debut playing against Ireland as a part of the 2024 Six Nations Under 20s Championship.Later on in the year, Jack was then called up to play for the Scotland A team that took on Chile. In 2025, Brown was selected for the Scotland U20 squad for the 2025 Six Nations Under 20s Championship. He played in all five matches of the tournament, contributing to Scotland's campaign with consistent performances in the backline.
