= Queen Victoria School =

Ministry of Defence boarding school in Dunblane, Scotland

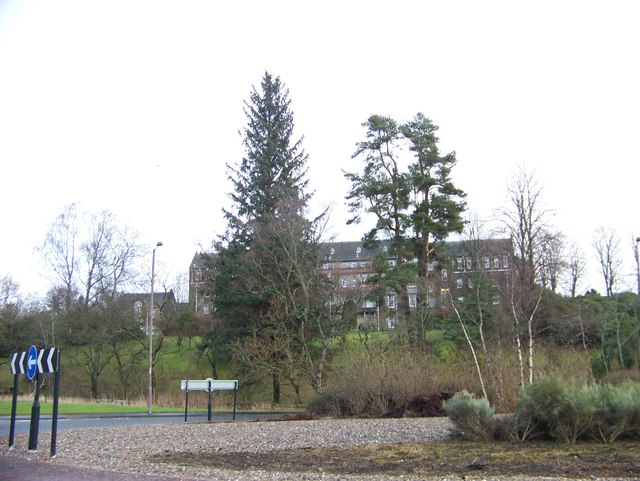
- School logo Queen Victoria School from the B8033

Location
- Bruce Brae; Dunblane, Perthshire, FK15 0JY; Scotland

Information
- Type: Ministry of Defence boarding school
- Motto: In Defens
- Religious affiliation: Church of Scotland
- Established: 1908
- Head: Dominic Fitzgerald
- Gender: Co-educational
- Age: 10 to 18
- Enrolment: 260~
- Houses: Haig, Trenchard, Wavell, Cunningham
- Colours: Green, Yellow, Red
- Website: www.qvs.school

Queen Victoria School (QVS) is a non-selective, co-educational, boarding school predominantly for children of Scottish servicemen and women aged 10/11 to 18. It occupies a Scottish Baronial-style building on a rural campus just outside Dunblane, a short distance away from the city of Stirling, Scotland.

It is the only school in the United Kingdom managed and funded by the Ministry of Defence (Duke of York's Royal Military School in Kent is now managed by the DfE). The school is an agency of the MOD. Education Scotland categorises QVS as an independent school.

== History ==
The idea of the school was originally proposed to Queen Victoria as a memorial to the Scottish dead of the Boer Wars, and after her death it was thought fit to name it in her memory. With the support of former politician Robert Cranston, money was raised from Scottish servicemen and the people of Scotland to complete the project. Queen Victoria School was opened on 28 September 1908 by King Edward VII. The chapel was completed in 1910 and is Scotland's memorial to Queen Victoria. Girls were admitted in the 1996–97 academic year into all years and the first female senior monitor, Victoria Harris, was chosen in 1999.

== Overview ==
=== Admissions ===
Originally only sons (and subsequently daughters) of Scottish service personnel were eligible to apply for entry to QVS. Today the school is not only open to applications from children of regular UK Armed Forces personnel who are Scottish but also to those who have served in Scotland or are/have been part of a Scottish regiment. Individuals without a formal Scottish link may also apply.

=== Curriculum ===
QVS uses the Scottish curriculum for excellence and pupils are prepared for National Qualifications (Nat 4–5), Highers and Advanced Highers.

=== Traditions ===
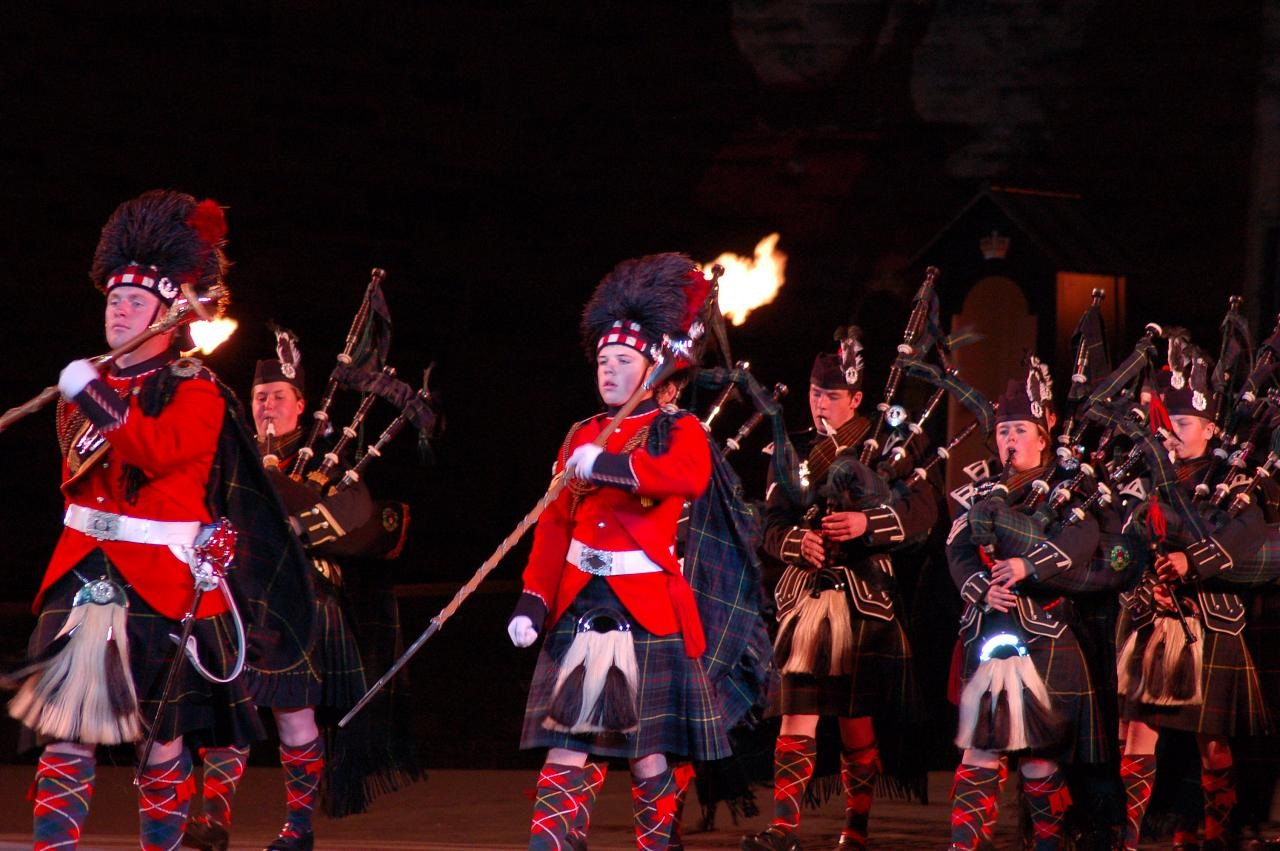
Queen Victoria School at the 2008 Royal Edinburgh Military Tattoo

Traditionally the school provided an austere but continuous education for Scottish war orphans, with a good deal of military training and sports. Since the Second World War, the school has provided an education to children whose parents or guardians have been travelling the world in the Armed Forces.

A strong military ethos is still maintained by a competing pipe band and Combined Cadet Force (CCF) section. The school has its own "colours" which are paraded nearly every Sunday during term times in the school chapel, its own cap badge, and pupils wear the Clan Stewart hunting tartan. The school pipe band used to play at every rugby home international at Murrayfield Stadium, Edinburgh.

=== Houses ===
The house system is based on the boarding programme as all pupils are boarders. Boarding is available to pupils aged 10 (Primary 7) and above. There are four houses:

House	Gender	Years
Cunningham	Junior/Senior Boys	P7–S6
Haig	Junior/Senior Boys	P7–S6
Wavell	Senior Girls	S3–S6
Trenchard	Junior Girls	P7-S2

== Combined Cadet Force ==
The school has strong military links with attendance at the Combined Cadet Force timetabled weekly. The pupils elect to join one of the three sections, they are Royal Navy, British Army or Royal Air Force.

Commanding officers:

Name	Rank	Years
Tom Shannon RD	Commander	2015–2020
David Acheson MBE	Captain	2020–2023
Russell Newham	Lieutenant	Current

== Notable alumni ==
Former students of Queen Victoria School are referred to as Old Victorians. See also Category:People educated at Queen Victoria School, Dunblane.

- Bob Bruce, retired major general in the British Army
- The MacDonald Brothers, pipers and folk musicians
- Thomas McQuesten, member of the Legislative Assembly of Ontario
- Charlie Mitten, football player for Manchester United
- Anthony Rogers, actor
- Kyle Rowe, Scotland and Glasgow Warriors professional rugby player
- Amena Caqusau, professional rugby player
