= Birkmyre RFC =

Scottish rugby union team

(Scotland) Birkmyre RFC
- Full name: Birkmyre Rugby Football Club
- Union: Scottish Rugby Union
- Founded: 1976; 50 years ago
- Location: Kilmacolm, Scotland
- Ground: Birkmyre Park
- Coach: Andrew Lang
- Captain: Robbie Espie / Ross Moglia
- League: West Division Two
- 2025–26: West Division Two, 5th of 9
Team kit

Birkmyre RFC is a rugby union side based in Kilmacolm, Inverclyde, Scotland. The club was founded in 1976. They play their home games at Birkmyre Park in Kilmacolm.

== History ==
The club has a large focus on attracting youth members with currently 250 junior players registered at the club. Glasgow Warriors players have help train Birkmyre RFC juniors in the past.

The club received the SRU's prestigious Team of the Month award in 2010; and the club president received it at Murrayfield in front of a sell-out crowd there to watch Scotland play South Africa. Birkmyre was only the second Western region club to receive that honour in its existence. The club received the award for a number of points:- its excellent disciplinary record; installing floodlights; new gym and training facilities; community work; sponsorship of local events; midi and mini sections; and its development of youth teams.

Work has been undertaken to increase the drainage at the rugby pitches at Birkmyre Park. This has cost £400,000.

== Notable former players ==
=== Men ===
- (Scotland) Stephen Speirs - victim of the Bali Bombing in 2002.
- (Scotland) Ruaraidh Hart - Glasgow Warriors player

=== Women ===
- (Scotland) Louise McMillan
- (Scotland) Siobhan McMillan

== Honours ==
- Clydesdale Sevens
  - Champions: 1995
- Strathendrick Sevens
  - Champions: 1986
- Helensburgh Sevens
  - Champions: 2025
