= Amena Caqusau =

English rugby union player (born 2004)

- Born: 17 July 2004 (age 22) Salisbury, England
- Height: 1.83 m (6 ft 0 in)
- Weight: 96 kg (15 st 2 lb)
- School: Queen Victoria School, Dunblane
- University: University of the West of Scotland

Rugby union career
- Position: Wing
Amateur team(s)
| Years | Team | Apps | (Points) |
| – | Salisbury | | |
| 2022–23 | Glasgow Hutchesons Aloysians | 11 | (35) |
| 2024–25 | Ayr | | |
Senior career
| Years | Team | Apps | (Points) |
| 2023–25 | Glasgow Warriors | 0 | (0) |
| 2025– | Northampton Saints | 18 | (20) |
Super Rugby
| Years | Team | Apps | (Points) |
| 2022–23 | Ayrshire Bulls | | |
International career
| Years | Team | Apps | (Points) |
- Scotland U18
| 2022–24 | Scotland U20 | 4 | (0) |
| 2024 | Emerging Scotland | 1 | (0) |

Amena Caqusau (born 17 July 2004) is a professional rugby union player who plays as a wing for Premiership Rugby club Northampton Saints and the Emerging Scotland national team. He previously played for Glasgow Warriors, Ayrshire Bulls and Glasgow Hutchesons Aloysians.

== Rugby Union career ==
=== Amateur career ===
Caqusau's father is Fijian and is in the British Army. Caqusau was born in Salisbury and was first introduced to rugby union at Salisbury Rugby Club when still at primary school. He then moved to Dunblane in Stirlingshire and went to Queen Victoria School, a noted school for the children of Scottish servicemen and women. Caqusau says he picked up most of his rugby in Scotland.

He played for Glasgow Hutchesons Aloysians for the 2022-23 season. He made 11 appearances, scoring 7 tries for the club, in a season where he dovetailed GHA appearances with those of the Ayrshire Bulls side.

He scored a hat-trick of tries for Ayr RFC as they defeated Watsonians in the Scottish Premiership play-off final in April 2025.

=== Professional career ===
Caqusau played for Ayrshire Bulls in the Super 6 league. He was voted into the Fans XV of the Championship in 2023.

He was then picked up by Glasgow Warriors in their academy intake of the 2023-24 season. Caqusau played in a run of 'A' matches for Glasgow Warriors that season, starting with Edinburgh 'A' on 24 November 2023 and then playing against the Super 6 sides Boroughmuir Bears on 20 April 2024 and his old side Ayrshire Bulls on 25 May 2024.

The following season, 2024-25, Caqusau played in the Warriors' pre-season match against Zebre Rugby on 30 August 2024. He then played for Glasgow Warriors 'A' against Edinburgh 'A' on 27 September 2024.

It was announced on 26 March 2025 that Northampton Saints had signed the player for the 2025-26 season.

=== International career ===
Although born in England with a Fijian father, Caqusau has been in the Scottish age grade system since the Under 16s. He played for Caledonia Under 16s and just missed out on being selected for the Scotland Under 16s squad going to Wales.

He played for Scotland Under 18s. He was selected for the squad for the Six Nations festival in France.

He has played for Scotland Under 20s. He was singled out as 'One to Watch' for the side. Chris Paterson said of him: "Amena is an x-factor talent. He's really quick, but it's his want to counter-attack. Counter-attack is as much about decision making as it about the ability to then find the space, but you have to have that ability that you want to attack, that you want to get in behind and the ability to finish it off."

Caqusau was named in the first Emerging Scotland squad in December 2024. He came on as a replacement after 35 minutes for Geordie Gwynn in the match against Italy U-23 side on 14 December 2024.
