= Henco Venter =

South African rugby union player

- Full name: Hendrik Petrus Venter
- Born: 27 March 1992 (age 34) Bloemfontein, South Africa
- Height: 1.94 m (6 ft 4 1/2 in)
- Weight: 107 kg (16 st 12 lb; 236 lb)
- School: Grey College
- Notable relative(s): Ruben Kruger, uncle

Rugby union career
- Position: Flanker
Youth career
- 2005–2013: Free State Cheetahs
Amateur team(s)
Years	Team	Apps	(Points)
2013–2015	UFS Shimlas	12	(0)
Senior career
Years	Team	Apps	(Points)
2012–2019	Free State Cheetahs	38	(15)
2014–2016	Free State XV	8	(5)
2015–2019	Cheetahs	57	(15)
2018–2019	Toshiba Brave Lupus	11	(10)
2020–23	Sharks	32	(10)
2020–23	Sharks (Currie Cup)	8	(5)
2023–25	Glasgow Warriors	36	(35)
2025–	Brive	1	(0)
International career
Years	Team	Apps	(Points)
2008	South Africa Under-16 Elite Squad		

Hendrik Petrus Venter (born 27 March 1992) is a South African rugby union player for Brive in the Pro D2. He previously played for Glasgow Warriors, Sharks and Cheetahs. His regular position is flanker.

== Rugby Union career ==
=== Youth and amateur career ===
Venter first played for Free State at the 2005 Under-13 Craven Week tournament. In 2008, he played for them in the 2008 Under-16 Grant Khomo Week and made it into an Under-16 Elite squad. He also played in the 2009 Academy Week. He played for Free State U19 in the 2011 Under-19 Provincial Championship competition and for Free State U21 in the 2012 Under-21 Provincial Championship and 2013 Under-21 Provincial Championship competitions.

Venter also played Varsity Cup rugby for UFS Shimlas. He was named in a Varsity Cup Dream Team at the conclusion of the 2015 Varsity Cup tournament which played one match against the South Africa Under-20s in Stellenbosch.

=== Professional career ===
Venter made his first class debut for the Free State Cheetahs in the 2012 Currie Cup promotion/relegation series against the Eastern Province Kings. He was also included in their squad for the 2013 Currie Cup Premier Division competition.

In July 2014, Venter signed a new contract with the Free State Cheetahs until the end of 2015.

He signed with Glasgow Warriors for the 2023–24 season. He made his competitive debut for the Glasgow side against Leinster at Scotstoun Stadium. Glasgow ran in seven tries in a 43–25 victory. He became Glasgow Warrior No. 353. He won Warrior of the Month for March 2024 and made a donation to Glasgow Children's Hospital Charity as part of the award.

A fan favourite, Venter reluctantly left Glasgow Warriors at the end of season 2024-25. His presence helped Glasgow Warriors younger players and the team get results especially during international windows when most of the Glasgow Warriors stars were playing with the Scotland international team. The SRU Performance Director David Nucifora advised the Scottish club to only sign Scottish Qualified players instead. Venter said: "I love this place and I'd love to stay, but... leave it there! They want more Scottish players and I understand that's their plan going forward and I respect that. I'm not Scottish, so it's a privilege to be here and give back to the club and the country." Glasgow Warriors Head Coach Franco Smith admitted: "If it was up to me, definitely he would stay." After his young Glasgow Warriors side were beaten in the URC by Scarlets at the end of the November Autumn Internationals break in 2025, Smith again bemoaned the decision to let his non-Scottish Qualified players leave the club: "There were guys like Henco Venter and those guys last year helped us to step up in these types of games. Not because they only made us win, but they also helped the youngsters that don't play that often."

For the 2025-26 season, Venter instead signed for French side Brive.

== Family ==
Venter is the nephew of the late South African international rugby player Ruben Kruger.
