= Scotland A national rugby union team =

Scotland A
- Union: Scottish Rugby Union
- Emblem: The Thistle
- Coach: (Ireland) Nigel Carolan
1st kit	2nd kit

First match
- Scotland 'A' 39–7 Spain (1990)

Largest win
- Scotland 'A' 99–0 Netherlands (1999)

Largest defeat
- Scotland A 3–60 Ireland A (1 March 2002)

The Scotland A team are the second national rugby union team behind the Scottish national side. The first Scotland 'A' fixture took place in 1990.

== History ==
Unlike association football, where the main team is supposed to be the "A" team, Scotland 'A' in rugby union is actually equivalent to the Scotland B football team. The Scotland 'A' side in rugby union is classed as a senior national side, along with the full national side and the Scotland 7s international side. When players play for any of these 3 senior sides; they commit their nationality to Scotland; and cannot then normally switch nationality to another international side. The parlance used deems these sides as 'capture' sides.

There was a history of national development sides in Scotland before the national 'A' side was introduced. The non-cap Scotland XV side started in 1969, the Scotland 'B' side introduced in 1971 was for uncapped players; and the start of the age-grade pathway sides - like the Under 21 side - which began in 1984.

=== Scotland XV, Scotland 'B' and age-grade sides ===
Scotland's status as one of the leading rugby nations in the Northern Hemisphere, made the SRU look to field a second team, first known as Scotland XV, which can play at the same level, sometimes even superior, of many second and third tier nations first sides. This team was a development side and players selected were not given caps and not tied to Scotland.

The Scotland XV first played in 1969, beating an Argentina side 20 - 3. These non-cap matches have proven controversial and there was a campaign to get players that were capped by the Scotland XV side as full caps. However the campaign failed; and these XV matches remain non-capped matches.

Scotland XV represented Scotland during the 1999 Rugby World Cup – European qualification, easily defeating Portugal by 85–11, and Spain by 85–3, in Murrayfield.

The launch of the Scotland 'B' side in 1971 provided uncapped players another route for recognition; this was a development side; no fully capped players were eligible. Like the Scotland XV side before it, this was not a 'capture' side.

The start of the Scotland age-grade teams in 1984 - on the launch of the national Under 21 side - were another pathway. Age-grade sides are not intended to be 'capture' sides; and their use as capture sides up to and including the Under 20 age-group range has now been banned by World Rugby.

=== Scotland 'A' ===
The 'A' side was launched as the second senior men's side in 1990, with the intention of giving a more formal step up to international rugby.

The Scotland 'A' side and Scotland 'B' side ran concurrently between 1990 and 1992; and are not regarded as similar. Indeed, players like Ian Corcoran, Douglas Wyllie and Damian Cronin have both Scotland 'A' and Scotland 'B' caps.

The 'A' side is used as an official 'capture' side for securing residency or otherwise qualified players for Scotland's international selection. Unlike the Scotland 'B' side there is no bar on fully-capped players playing for the 'A' side, although fully capped players are usually restricted to a few in the squad selection; primarily to provide leadership to the other players.

Before the professional era, Scotland 'A' played against touring national sides from the southern hemisphere.

== Record ==
Below is a table of the representative rugby matches played by Scotland A up until 6 February 2026, updated after match with Italy A.

Opponent	Played	Won	Lost	Drawn	% Won
Argentina XV	4	2	1	1	50%
Australia A	2	0	2	0	0%
Canada	2	2	0	0	100%
Catalonia	1	0	1	0	0%
Chile	2	2	0	0	100%
England A	13	4	7	2	30.77%
Fiji Warriors	1	1	0	0	100%
France A	18	8	10	0	44.44%
Georgia	2	1	1	0	50%
Ireland XV	17	7	9	1	41.18%
Italy	3	2	1	0	66.67%
Italy A	9	6	2	1	66.67%
Namibia	1	0	1	0	0%
New Zealand Māori	1	0	1	0	0%
New Zealand XV	2	0	2	0	0%
Romania A	1	1	0	0	100%
Russia	1	1	0	0	100%
Samoa A	2	1	1	0	50%
South Africa A	2	2	0	0	100%
Spain	3	3	0	0	100%
Tonga A	1	1	0	0	100%
United States	1	1	0	0	100%
United States XV	1	1	0	0	100%
Uruguay	1	1	0	0	100%
Wales A	7	4	3	0	57.14%
Zimbabwe	2	2	0	0	100%
Zimbabwe A	2	2	0	0	100%
Total	103	56	42	5	54.37%

== Current squad ==
Nigel Carolan named a 13 man 'A' squad to face Italy XV on 6 February 2026. This was then supplemented by unused Scotland players in the Six Nations tournament.

Note: Caps listed are full international caps.

Head coach: (Ireland) Nigel Carolan

Player	Position	Date of birth (age)	Caps	Club/province
Gregor Hiddleston	Hooker	26 March 2002 (age 24)	0	(Scotland) Glasgow Warriors
Harri Morris	Hooker	13 October 2001 (age 25)	1	(Scotland) Edinburgh
Seb Stephen	Hooker	29 August 2005 (age 21)	0	(Scotland) Glasgow Warriors
Alec Hepburn	Prop	30 March 1993 (age 33)	5	(Wales) Scarlets
Will Hurd	Prop	29 June 1999 (age 27)	9	(England) Leicester Tigers
D'Arcy Rae	Prop	21 December 1994 (age 31)	5	(Scotland) Edinburgh
Rory Sutherland	Prop	24 August 1992 (age 34)	48	(Scotland) Glasgow Warriors
Alex Craig	Lock	26 April 1997 (age 29)	6	(Scotland) Glasgow Warriors
Jonny Gray	Lock	14 March 1994 (age 32)	81	(France) Bordeaux Bègles
Cameron Henderson	Lock	13 January 2000 (age 26)	3	(England) Leicester Tigers
Josh Bayliss	Flanker	18 September 1997 (age 29)	15	(England) Bath
Freddy Douglas	Flanker	14 May 2005 (age 21)	1	(Scotland) Edinburgh
Euan Ferrie	Flanker	23 July 2001 (age 25)	0	(Scotland) Glasgow Warriors
Andy Onyeama-Christie	Flanker	27 June 1999 (age 27)	11	(England) Saracens
Magnus Bradbury	Number 8	23 August 1995 (age 31)	21	(Scotland) Edinburgh
Alex Masibaka	Number 8	16 September 1998 (age 28)	1	(France) Montpellier
Ben Afshar	Scrum-half	2 April 2003 (age 23)	0	(Scotland) Glasgow Warriors
Gus Warr	Scrum-half	24 September 1999 (age 27)	2	(England) Sale Sharks
Fergus Burke	Fly-half	3 September 1999 (age 27)	4	(England) Saracens
Dan Lancaster	Fly-half	23 May 2001 (age 25)	0	(Scotland) Glasgow Warriors
Cameron Redpath	Centre	23 December 1999 (age 26)	15	(England) Bath
Ollie Smith	Centre	7 August 2000 (age 26)	14	(Scotland) Glasgow Warriors
Arron Reed	Wing	10 July 1999 (age 27)	5	(England) Sale Sharks
Kyle Rowe	Wing	8 February 1998 (age 28)	18	(Scotland) Glasgow Warriors
Harry Paterson	Fullback	28 June 2001 (age 25)	3	(Scotland) Edinburgh

== Competitions ==
They used to compete in the Churchill Cup alongside the full national teams of Canada and the United States as well as Ireland A, England Saxons, Argentina A and the New Zealand Māori.

They competed in the IRB Nations Cup, winning the competition in 2009 and ending last in 2010.

== Coaching staff ==
Sources:

- Head coach: Nigel Carolan
- Defence coach: Scott Forrest
- Forwards coach: Stevie Lawrie
- Team manager: John Manson
- Doctor: Mike Dunlop
- Physiotherapist: Andy Hay
- Physiotherapist: Andy Boag
- Strength and conditioning coach: Liam Walshe
- Strength and conditioning coach: Andy Ryan
- Performance analyst: Cammy Mack
- Performance analyst: Greg Woolard
- Kit manager: Claire Bain

== See also ==
=== Men's National teams ===
==== Senior ====
- Scotland national rugby union team
- Scotland national rugby sevens team

==== Development ====
- Scotland B national rugby union team
- Scotland Club XV
- Emerging Scotland

==== Age Grades ====
- Scotland national under-21 rugby union team
- Scotland national under-20 rugby union team
- Scotland national under-19 rugby union team
- Scotland national under-18 rugby union team
- Scotland national under-17 rugby union team
- Scotland national under-16 rugby union team

=== Women's National teams ===
==== Senior ====
- Scotland women's national rugby union team
- Scotland women's national rugby union team (sevens)
