= Ruaraidh Hart =

Scottish rugby union player (born 2004)

- Born: 6 May 2004 (age 22) Glasgow, Scotland
- Height: 1.93 m (6 ft 4 in)
- Weight: 109 kg (17 st 2 lb)

Rugby union career
- Position: Flanker
Amateur team(s)
Years	Team	Apps	(Points)
2012-22	Birkmyre		
2022	Glasgow Hawks		
2024-25	Glasgow University		
2025-26	Stirling County		
Senior career
Years	Team	Apps	(Points)
2023–24	Glasgow Warriors	1	(0)
2026-	Glasgow Warriors	0	(0)
International career
Years	Team	Apps	(Points)
2022	Scotland U18		
2023-24	Scotland U20	2	(0)
2026	Scotland Club XV	1	(0)

Ruaraidh Hart (born 6 May 2004) is a Scotland Club XV international rugby union player for Glasgow Warriors in the United Rugby Championship. Hart's primary position is Flanker but can also play Lock.

== Rugby Union career ==
=== Amateur career ===
Hart played for Birkmyre RFC and then moved on to play for Glasgow Hawks.

While studying at university Hart played for Glasgow University. He then played for Stirling County and was made vice-captain of the side.

=== Professional career ===
Hart was named as a member of the Glasgow Warriors academy for the 2023–24 season.

While with the academy he played for Stirling Wolves in the Super Series.

Glasgow head coach Franco Smith said of the player before his competitive Glasgow debut:

Ruaridh ‘Big’ Hart, as we call him, has done exceptionally well in pre-season. He's trained well and his detail is excellent. He looks like a seasoned campaigner when it comes to the detail. It's a good opportunity to step up into the big league and take this experience back to Scotland U20s next week.

He made his debut for Glasgow Warriors in Round 10 of the 2023–24 United Rugby Championship against Dragons. He became Glasgow Warrior No. 359.

Hart left Glasgow Warriors in the summer of 2024 to concentrate on university work. While at university he dropped down to play rugby union at amateur grade.

However he rejoined Glasgow Warriors on 4 September 2026.

=== International career ===
He has represented Scotland U18 in 2022.

He has two caps for Scotland U20.

Hart played for Scotland Club XV against Ireland Club XV in February 2026.
