= Malelili Satala =

English rugby player

- Born: 24 October 2004 (age 22) Edinburgh, Scotland
- Height: 1.84 m (6 ft 0 in)
- Weight: 90 kg (198 lb)
- School: Brooksby Melton College
- Notable relative(s): Apolosi Satala (father); Viliame Satala (uncle)

Rugby union career
- Position(s): Winger; Full-back
- Current team: Edinburgh
Senior career
Years	Team	Apps	(Points)
2024–2025	Leicester Tigers	4	(5)
2025-	Edinburgh Rugby		
- Correct as of 23 February 2025
International career
Years	Team	Apps	(Points)
2023	England U20		
2025	Emerging Scotland	1	(0)

Malelili Satala-Navlivou (born 24 October 2004) is an Emerging Scotland international rugby union player who plays wing for Edinburgh. Born in Edinburgh, he is eligible to play internationally for Scotland, England or Fiji, the latter through his ex-Edinburgh Rugby father, Apolosi Satala. He previously played for Leicester Tigers in Premiership Rugby.

== Rugby Union career ==
=== Professional career ===
He was a member of Leicester Tigers senior academy for the 2023-24 season. He made a try scoring debut for Leicester Tigers in the Premiership Rugby Cup on 1 November 2024 against Northampton Saints.

In May 2025 it was announced that he had signed a 2 year deal with Edinburgh Rugby.

=== International career ===
He has played for the England national under-20 rugby union team. He made his debut for Emerging Scotland on 17 November 2025.

== Personal life ==
He attended Brooksby Melton College. He is the son of Fijian rugby union international Apolosi Satala.
