= Kyle Rowe =

Scottish rugby union player (born 1998)

- Born: 8 February 1998 (age 28) Ascot, England
- Height: 1.83 m (6 ft 0 in)
- Weight: 88 kg (194 lb; 13 st 12 lb)
- School: Queen Victoria School

Rugby union career
- Position(s): Wing, Fullback
- Current team: Glasgow Warriors
Senior career
Years	Team	Apps	(Points)
2021	Edinburgh	1	(0)
2021–2022	London Irish	23	(50)
2023–	Glasgow Warriors	37	(90)
- Correct as of 16 March 2024
International career
Years	Team	Apps	(Points)
2018	Scotland U20	9	(20)
2019–2020	Scotland 7s	21	(35)
2022–	Scotland	22	(40)
2026	Scotland 'A'	1	(10)
- Correct as of 18 November 2026

Kyle Rowe (born 8 February 1998) is a Scotland international rugby union player who plays as a wing for United Rugby Championship club Glasgow Warriors. Born in England, he represents Scotland at international level after qualifying on residency grounds, living in Scotland since he was 8 years old.

== Early life ==
Rowe's family moved to Scotland when he was 8. He was educated at Queen Victoria School in Dunblane. Rowe started with Falkirk RFC before moving to Glasgow Hawks.

Rowe won the Premiership title and the Scottish Cup with Ayr in 2019; scoring three tries across both finals.

== Club career ==
He was named as part of the Scotland 7s that will be available to Glasgow Warriors for selection for the first part of the 2019-20 season to help the club deal with the loss of their international players for the 2019 Rugby World Cup.

After a stint at Edinburgh he signed for London Irish ahead of the 2021–22 season.

He signed again for Glasgow Warriors on 5 July 2023 in a two-year deal.

== International career ==
Rowe was capped at Scotland U19 grade.

Rowe was capped for Scotland U20. He played for the U20s from 2018 to 2019.

He was selected as part of the Scotland 7s squad for the London Sevens tournament. He was capped for Scotland 7s during that tournament.

In January 2022 Rowe was named in the Scotland squad for the 6 Nations Championship but did not get to play.

On 9 July 2022 he went on as a replacement for Rory Hutchinson late in the first half in the second test against Argentina in Salta to win his first full international cap. However, he played for just 12 minutes before going off injured.

He played for Scotland 'A' on 6 February 2026 in their match against Italy XV, scoring two tries.

=== List of international tries ===
No.	Date	Venue	Opponent	Score	Result	Competition
1	20 July 2024	Estadio Nacional Julio Martínez Prádanos, Santiago, Chile	Chile	12-0	52-11	2024 mid-year rugby union tests
2	20 July 2024	Estadio Nacional Julio Martínez Prádanos, Santiago, Chile	Chile	38-0	52-11	2024 mid-year rugby union tests
3	2 November 2024	Murrayfield Stadium, Edinburgh, Scotland	Fiji	5-0	57-17	[2024 end-of-year rugby union internationals]]
4	12 July 2025	HFC Bank Stadium, Suva, Fiji	Fiji	5-0	14-29	2025 mid-year rugby union tests
5	18 July 2025	Eden Park, Auckland, New Zealand	Samoa	34-5	41-12	2025 mid-year rugby union tests
6	1 November 2025	Murrayfield Stadium, Edinburgh, Scotland	United States	50-0	85-0	2025 end-of-year rugby union internationals
7	4 July 2026	Estadio Mario Alberto Kempes, Córdoba, Argentina	Argentina	45-24	47-38	Nations Championship
8	11 July 2026	Loftus Versfeld Stadium, Pretoria, South Africa	South Africa	12-14	28-42	Nations Championship

as of 12 July 2026

== Personal life ==
Kyle Rowe has been engaged to Rhona Wilson since July 2021.
