= Ben Afshar =

Scottish rugby union player (born 2003)

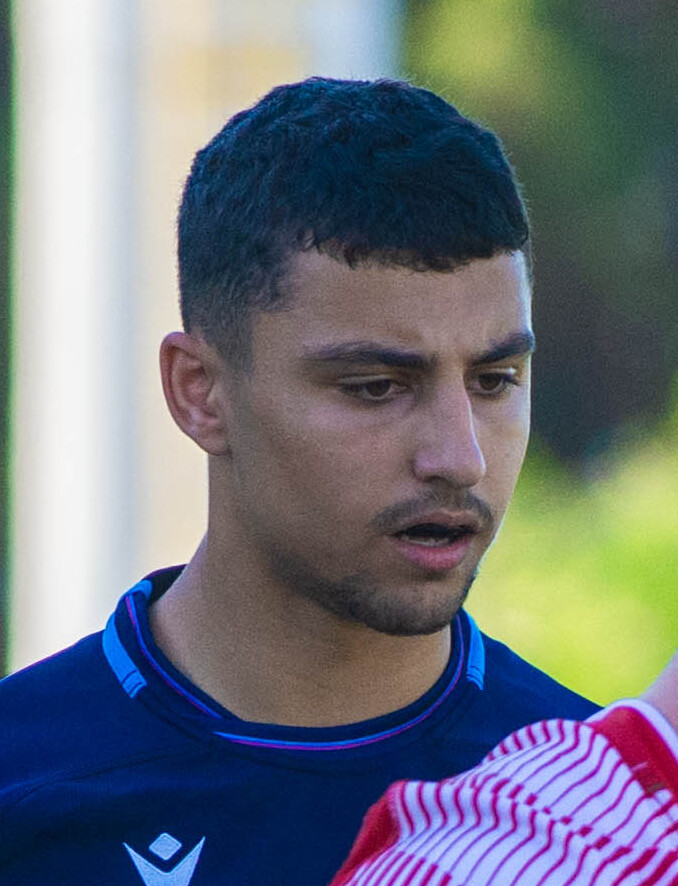
- Afshar in 2022
- Born: Ben Afshar; 2 April 2003 (age 23) Edinburgh, Scotland
- Height: 6 ft 0 in (1.83 m)
- Weight: 81 kg (179 lb; 12 st 11 lb)
- School: Merchiston Castle School

Rugby union career
- Position: Scrum half
Amateur team(s)
| Years | Team | Apps | (Points) |
| 2009–15 | Edinburgh Academicals | | |
Senior career
| Years | Team | Apps | (Points) |
| 2022– | Glasgow Warriors | 32 | (10) |
Super Rugby
| Years | Team | Apps | (Points) |
| 2021–22 | Southern Knights | | |
| 2022–23 | Ayrshire Bulls | | |
| 2023– | Stirling Wolves | | |
International career
| Years | Team | Apps | (Points) |
| 2019 | Scotland U16 | | |
| 2020 | Scotland U18 | | |
| 2022– | Scotland U20 | | |
| 2024 | Scotland 'A' | 2 | (0) |
| 2025 | Emerging Scotland | 1 | (5) |

Ben Afshar (born 2 April 2003) is a Scotland 'A' international rugby union player who plays for Glasgow Warriors at the Scrum half position.

== Rugby Union career ==
=== Amateur career ===
He played with Edinburgh Academicals from the age of 6, before joining the Merchiston Castle School set-up.

=== Professional career ===
Afshar joined Glasgow Warriors in 2022, initially with the Scottish Rugby Academy, before graduating from the academy with a permanent partnership deal with the Glasgow Warriors and Stirling Wolves in 2023.

He played for the Southern Knights in 2022, before moving to the Ayrshire Bulls.

He played in the pre-season matches for Glasgow Warriors against Ayrshire Bulls in the 2022–23 season. He then played for Glasgow Warriors 'A' side against the Super 6 sides Ayrshire Bulls, Boroughmuir Bears in the 2022–23 season.

He played in the pre-season matches for Glasgow Warriors against Ulster and Zebre in the 2023–24 season.

He then made his competitive debut for the Warriors against Ulster Rugby on 25 November 2023 in the United Rugby Championship in a bonus point win which took the Warriors top of the URC league. He became Glasgow Warrior No. 356.

=== International career ===
Afshar came through the age grades for Scotland playing at Under 16 and Under 18s. Afshar co-captained the Scotland U20 in 2023.

He was named as a development player in the Scotland squad for their summer tour of the Americas in 2024.

He made his debut for Emerging Scotland on 17 November 2025, scoring a try.

He was capped in the Scotland 'A' international match against Chile on 23 November 2024. He played for Scotland 'A' on 6 February 2026 in their match against Italy XV.
