= Donald White (rugby union) =

- Full name: Donald M. White
- Born: 21 November 1943 (age 82)

Rugby union career
- Position: Centre
International career
Years	Team	Apps	(Points)
1963	Scotland	4	(0)

Donald M. White (born 21 November 1943) is a Scottish international rugby union player.

White attended Kelvinside Academy and Glenalmond College, captaining the first XV of the latter.

A centre, White was 19 years of age when he gained four Scotland caps in the 1963 Five Nations. He played varsity rugby while studying at St John's College, Oxford, and was a member of the Combined Oxford-Cambridge side which toured South Africa in 1963. Injury prevented him being awarded his blues for Oxford University.

== See also ==
- List of Scotland national rugby union players
