= Geordie Gwynn =

Scottish rugby union player

- Born: Geordie William Kennedy Gwynn; 22 January 2004 (age 22) Brighton, England
- Height: 1.87 m (6 ft 2 in)
- Weight: 92 kg (14 st 7 lb)

Rugby union career
- Position: Wing / Centre
- Current team: Edinburgh Rugby
Amateur team(s)
Years	Team	Apps	(Points)
- Lewes RFC
–	Brunel University RFC		
Senior career
Years	Team	Apps	(Points)
2022 - 2026	Ealing Trailfinders		
2026 -	Edinburgh Rugby		
International career
Years	Team	Apps	(Points)
	Scotland U16		(5)
2022 - 2024	Scotland U20	10	(15)
2024-	Emerging Scotland	2	(0)

Geordie Gwynn (born 22 January 2004) is an Emerging Scotland international rugby union player who plays for Edinburgh Rugby at the Wing or Centre positions. He previously played for Ealing Trailfinders, Brunel University RFC and Lewes RFC.

== Rugby Union career ==
=== Amateur career ===
He started playing rugby for Lewes RFC at the age of 4.

While at Brunel University he played for their rugby union side. He was studying Sports, Health and Exercise Science with Business.

=== Professional career ===
In 2022 he signed for Ealing Trailfinders in the RFU Championship.

In April 2026 it was announced that he had signed a 3 year deal with Edinburgh Rugby.

=== International career ===
His mother was born in Edinburgh and grew up in Fala, Midlothian. Gwynn states he has always been a Scotland fan and attends at least one Scotland Six Nations every year.

He was capped for Scotland U16.

He played for Scotland U20s from 2022 to 2024. He co-captained the side in their last match of the U20 2024 Six Nations.

He scored two tries against Japan which helped Scotland to the final of the World Rugby U20 Trophy.

On 14 December 2024 he played for the first international match for the Emerging Scotland side. He was capped again against Tonga XV.
