= 1998–99 Glasgow Warriors season =

- Ground(s): Hughenden Stadium; Firhill Stadium; Rubislaw Playing Fields; McDiarmid Park; Bridgehaugh Park
- Coach(es): (New Zealand) Keith Robertson to January 1999 (Scotland) Richie Dixon from January 1999
- Captain: (Scotland) Gordon Bulloch
- Most caps: (Scotland) Stewart Campbell (Scotland) Willie Anderson (13)
- Top scorer: (Cook Islands) Tommy Hayes (92)
- Most tries: (Scotland) Shaun Longstaff (4)
- League: 1998–99 Scottish Inter-District Championship
- 2nd
1st kit	2nd kit

The 1998–99 season is the third in the history of the Glasgow Warriors as a professional side. During this season the young professional side competed as Glasgow Caledonians.

This season saw Glasgow Caledonians compete in the competitions: the Scottish Inter-District Championship and the European Champions Cup, the Heineken Cup - as well as the Welsh Rugby Union's Challenge Cup.

== Season overview ==
This proved to be one of the most turbulent years in the club's existence. The SRU decided to reduce the number of professional teams in Scotland from 4 to 2. Only Glasgow and Edinburgh now remained standing; with Glasgow taking over the Caledonia district – and Edinburgh taking over the Borders district. The fall-out from this caused many professional players to lose their jobs and created managerial problems at Glasgow.

Meanwhile, behind the scenes there were negotiations on trying to get a suitable league structure in place for the two remaining Scottish professional sides.

=== Merger ===
The SRU announced on 26 March 1998 that they would be halving the number of teams who compete in Europe.

The move stunned almost everyone in Scottish rugby; including Jim Telfer who had little time to prepare a defence of the four districts. Telfer thought about resigning over the move.

What was even more surprising was the two sides ear-marked for closure. Caledonia Reds were the current Scottish Inter-District Championship holders. Border Reivers were based in Scotland's rugby heartland.

The SRU claimed the move was a rugby decision. The fact that last season's top two sides Caledonia Reds and Glasgow Warriors were being merged into one however made most doubt this.

Some clubs - resentful of the districts in Europe – celebrated the decision and saw it as the death-knell of the Scottish districts. The Hawick president Robert Christie said: "We are strongly in favour of this new development. We want clubs to get back to having a meaningful season." Former Grand Slam winning captain - and part of the 'Gang of Four' arguing against districts - David Sole stated: "This proves yet again that to put the focus on districts was an ill-conceived and ill-planned idea which wasn't thought through".

It soon became clear that finance was at the heart of the decision. The Herald ran this story over the closures: "There is absolutely no doubt in my mind that the prime reason for the SRU cutting their squad from 120 to 60 is to cut costs and appease the clubs" and "they have slashed the so-called budget by dumping players and they'll save nearly a million quid."

It was later announced that 43 players had been cut from the professional clubs. For the Glasgow side it meant that it lost about half its squad to make way for around half of the Caledonia squad.

The Glasgow District now consumed the Caledonia District - and the Edinburgh District took in the Borders District. The new districts were deemed 'Super-districts'. This was an unfortunate name as, at least initially, their play did not merit the term and the reduction of the districts hindered player progression around the country.

=== New coach ===
It was felt that Robertson struggled with trying to bond the newly merged squad together. For the first time then, the SRU appointed a top name Scottish coach for the professional Glasgow side.

Richie Dixon was the former Scotland boss from 1995 to 1998, with a success rate (50%) at Scotland national level higher than Ian McGeechan (42%) and just slightly below that of Jim Telfer (53.8%). Dixon had quit the national job after Scotland lost a Five Nations warm up match to the fast improving Italian team but it was thought, with his experience, he was best placed to bring the district players together.

Perhaps more importantly to Glasgow, he was a former Glasgow District player and captain in the amateur days of the club. As a player, he won the Scottish Inter-District Championship outright for Glasgow District in 1974. He took over the district as coach in 1983 and won the Championship as coach for Glasgow in 1989–90 in an unbeaten season, also beating the touring Fiji national rugby union team. There was no doubting his Glasgow pedigree. He took over Glasgow Caledonians in January 1999.

=== League structure ===
With only 2 Scottish teams the Scottish Inter-District Championship could not continue in its current form. The restricted 3 game format was kept; however this was deemed a 'tri-series': essentially a best-of-three tournament to determine the winner.

It was felt that only playing 3 games against the same opposition would not help either Glasgow or Edinburgh in their European campaigns.

To try and increase the level of competition available, friendlies were sought as a short term fix while negotiations continued with other Rugby Unions. Pleasingly for the SRU, the Welsh Rugby Union and the Irish Rugby Football Union were meandering their way to a similar conclusion about increasing competitiveness for their own sides. The Scottish district sides faced up to the Irish provinces as part of the friendlies organised for the pre-season. In competitive matches, Glasgow and Edinburgh were also invited sides to take part in this season's Welsh Rugby Union's Challenge Cup. The SRU also organised pre-season friendlies against London Scottish - a member of the Scottish Rugby Union - and their London neighbour Richmond for Glasgow. It also organised friendlies against touring international teams for the clubs.

The Irish Rugby Football Union was against joining a British and Irish league. Thoughts in Wales turned to England. Initially it was thought that the English Rugby Union might be interested in a British league. However their proposals to the Welsh Rugby Union - that 5 Welsh clubs join a two tier English league - showed English contempt for the 'British' plan. The English model was flatly rejected by the WRU. The Wales coach Graham Henry said "It was right to reject this paltry offer. What was proposed wasn't British, just a few Welsh clubs in a predominantly English league which would have been no good to anyone".

The SRU felt the creation of a Celtic League for the Scottish, Irish and Welsh sides was the best way forward. This however didn't happen immediately but the fledgling success of the Scottish sides in the WRU Challenge Cup engendered good relations between Scotland and Wales and paved the way for a Welsh-Scottish League.

== Team ==
=== Coaches ===
- Head coach: (New Zealand) Keith Robertson to January 1999; (Scotland) Richie Dixon from January 1999.
- Assistant coach: (New Zealand) Gordon Macpherson
- Assistant coach: (Scotland) Rob Moffat from January 1999.

=== Squad ===
Hookers (Scotland) Gordon Bulloch (Scotland) Chris Docherty (Scotland) Kevin McKenzie (Scotland) Gavin Scott Props (Scotland) Willie Anderson (Scotland) Alan Kittle (Scotland) John Manson (Scotland) Gordon McIlwham (Scotland) Tom Smith Locks (Scotland) Stewart Campbell (Scotland) Stuart Grimes (Scotland) Guy Perrett (Scotland) Rob Wainwright	Loose forwards (Scotland) Gareth Flockhart (Scotland) Gordon Mackay (Scotland) Jon Petrie (Scotland) John Shaw (Scotland) Gordon Simpson (Scotland) Martin Waite (Scotland) Murray Wallace (Scotland) Jason White Half backs (Scotland) Graeme Beveridge (Scotland) Derrick Patterson (Scotland) Fraser Stott Stand offs (Cook Islands) Tommy Hayes (Scotland) Cameron Little (Scotland) Chris Paterson (South Africa) Luke Smith	Centres (Scotland) Alan Bulloch (New Zealand) Aaron Collins (Scotland) Murray Craig (Scotland) Ian Jardine (Scotland) John Leslie (Scotland) Matt McGrandles (Scotland) Chris Simmers Back Three (Scotland) James Craig (Scotland) Shaun Longstaff (Scotland) Glenn Metcalfe (Scotland) Derek Stark (Scotland) Rowen Shepherd

=== Academy players ===
Glasgow District Rugby Union once again sent a Glasgow Thistles squad to New Zealand for their development. The young players trained and played in New Zealand in the summer of 1999.

== Player statistics ==
During the 1998–99 season, Glasgow have used 35 different players in competitive games. The table below shows the number of appearances and points scored by each player.

Pos.	Nation	Name	Scottish Inter-District Championship			Heineken Cup			WRU Challenge Cup			Total	
Pos.	Nation	Name	Apps (sub)	Tries	Points kicked	Apps (sub)	Tries	Points kicked	Apps (sub)	Tries	Points kicked	Apps (sub)	Total Pts
HK	(Scotland)	Gordon Bulloch	1(1)	0	0	6	0	0	2	0	0	9(1)	0
HK	(Scotland)	Kevin McKenzie	2(1)	0	0	(1)	0	0	1(1)	0	0	3(3)	0
HK	(Scotland)	Gavin Scott	0	0	0	0	0	0	1	0	0	1	0
PR	(Scotland)	Willie Anderson	3	0	0	5(1)	0	0	3(1)	0	0	11(2)	0
PR	(Scotland)	Alan Kittle	(1)	0	0	1(1)	0	0	0	0	0	1(2)	0
PR	(Scotland)	John Manson	0	0	0	0	0	0	1(1)	0	0	1(1)	0
PR	(Scotland)	Gordon McIlwham	1(2)	0	0	2(3)	0	0	4	0	0	7(5)	0
PR	(Scotland)	Tom Smith	2	0	0	4	0	0	0	0	0	6	0
LK	(Scotland)	Stewart Campbell	3	0	0	6	0	0	4	0	0	13	0
LK	(Scotland)	Stuart Grimes	3	0	0	6	0	0	3	0	0	12	0
LK	(Scotland)	Guy Perrett	(1)	0	0	(2)	0	0	1	0	0	1(3)	0
LK	(Scotland)	Rob Wainwright	1(1)	0	0	4	0	0	2(1)	1	0	7(2)	5
BR	(Scotland)	Gareth Flockhart	1(1)	0	0	(2)	0	0	2(2)	0	0	3(5)	0
BR	(Scotland)	Gordon Mackay	1	0	0	(1)	0	0	(1)	0	0	1(2)	0
BR	(Scotland)	Jon Petrie	(1)	0	0	0	0	0	(1)	0	0	(2)	0
BR	(Scotland)	John Shaw	2(1)	0	0	5(1)	0	0	3	1	0	10(2)	5
BR	(Scotland)	Gordon Simpson	(1)	0	0	2	0	0	2	2	0	4(1)	10
BR	(Scotland)	Martin Waite	2	0	0	1(1)	1	0	3(1)	0	0	6(2)	5
BR	(Scotland)	Jason White	2	0	0	6	0	0	0	0	0	8	0
SH	(Scotland)	Graeme Beveridge	0	0	0	0	0	0	1	0	0	1	0
SH	(Scotland)	Derrick Patterson	0	0	0	1(2)	0	0	1(1)	1	0	2(3)	5
SH	(Scotland)	Fraser Stott	3	0	0	5(1)	0	0	2	0	0	10(1)	0
FH	(Cook Islands)	Tommy Hayes	3	1	19	5(1)	0	51	2(1)	0	17	10(2)	92
FH	(South Africa)	Luke Smith	1	0	3	1(1)	0	8	2	1	11	4(1)	27
CE	(Scotland)	Alan Bulloch	(1)	0	0	(1)	0	0	3	0	0	3(2)	0
CE	(New Zealand)	Aaron Collins	0	0	0	(1)	0	0	2	0	0	2(1)	0
CE	(Scotland)	Ian Jardine	2	0	0	4(1)	0	0	4	0	0	10(1)	0
CE	(Scotland)	John Leslie	1	0	0	0	0	0	2	1	0	3	5
CE	(Scotland)	Matt McGrandles	0	0	0	(1)	0	0	0	0	0	(1)	0
CE	(Scotland)	Chris Simmers	1(1)	0	0	5	1	0	0	0	0	6(1)	5
WG	(Scotland)	James Craig	2	0	0	3	2	0	2	0	0	7	10
WG	(Scotland)	Shaun Longstaff	2(1)	0	0	4(2)	2	0	2	2	0	8(3)	20
WG	(Scotland)	Derek Stark	2(1)	0	0	5(1)	0	0	3	1	0	10(2)	5
FB	(Scotland)	Glenn Metcalfe	1	0	0	4	2	0	2	0	0	7	10
FB	(Scotland)	Rowen Shepherd	2	1	0	5	2	12	0	0	0	7	27

== Staff movements ==
=== Coaches ===
==== Personnel In ====
- (Scotland) Richie Dixon from (England) London Scottish

==== Personnel Out ====
- (New Zealand) Keith Robertson to Scotland Under 21 (Asst).

== Player movements ==
=== Academy promotions ===
Glasgow has no formal academy structure as yet, however Glasgow District Rugby Union is continuing to send its most promising youngsters - the Glasgow Thistles - to New Zealand for summer training.

These two players from the 1998 Glasgow Thistles team to go to New Zealand were used as part of the Glasgow squad, though they did not play. They continued to play for their amateur sides when not in use for Glasgow.

- Rory Kerr from West of Scotland F.C.
- (Scotland) Rory Couper from (Scotland) Ardrossan Academicals RFC

=== Player transfers ===
==== In ====
- (South Africa) Luke Smith from (South Africa) Border Bulldogs
- (Scotland) Graeme Beveridge from (Scotland) Edinburgh Rugby
- (Scotland) Shaun Longstaff from (Scotland) Caledonia Reds
- (Scotland) Kevin McKenzie from (Scotland) Caledonia Reds
- (Scotland) John Leslie from (New Zealand) Highlanders
- (Scotland) Chris Paterson from (Scotland) Gala RFC
- (Scotland) Stuart Grimes from (Scotland) Caledonia Reds
- (Scotland) Rob Wainwright from (Scotland) Caledonia Reds
- (Scotland) Jason White from (Scotland) Caledonia Reds
- (Scotland) Gordon Simpson from (Scotland) Caledonia Reds
- (Scotland) Derrick Patterson from (Scotland) Caledonia Reds
- (Scotland) Stewart Campbell from (Scotland) Caledonia Reds
- (Scotland) Tom Smith from (Scotland) Caledonia Reds
- (Scotland) Gareth Flockhart from (Scotland) Caledonia Reds
- (Scotland) Gavin Scott from (Scotland) Caledonia Reds
- (Scotland) Willie Anderson from (Scotland) Caledonia Reds
- (Scotland) Martin Waite from (Scotland) Caledonia Reds
- (Scotland) James McLaren from (Scotland) Caledonia Reds
- (Scotland) Rowen Shepherd from (Scotland) Caledonia Reds
- (Scotland) John Manson from (Scotland) Caledonia Reds
- (Scotland) Jon Petrie from (Scotland) Dundee HSFP
- (Scotland) Murray Craig from (Scotland) Edinburgh Rugby

==== Out ====
- (Scotland) Shade Munro retired
- (Scotland) Fergus Wallace to (Scotland) Glasgow Hawks
- (Cook Islands) Mike Beckham to (England) Leeds Tykes
- (Scotland) David Jamieson to (Scotland) Stirling County RFC
- (England) Danny Porte to (Scotland) Watsonians RFC
- (Scotland) Charles Afuakwah to (Scotland) Glasgow Hawks
- (Scotland) Gerry Hawkes to (Scotland) Glasgow Hawks
- (Scotland) Scott Hutton to (Scotland) Glasgow Hawks
- (Scotland) Stephen Begley to (Scotland) Glasgow Hawks
- (Scotland) Malcolm Norval to (Scotland) Stirling County RFC
- (Scotland) Andrew Ness to (Scotland) Glasgow Hawks
- (Scotland) Gavin Fraser to (Scotland) Watsonians RFC
- (Scotland) Craig Sangster to (England) Blackheath
- (Scotland) Danny Ablett to (Scotland) Glasgow Hawks
- (Scotland) David McLeish retired
- (Scotland) Jamie Weston to (Scotland) Watsonians RFC
- (Scotland) Iain Sinclair to (Scotland) Edinburgh Reivers
- (Scotland) James McLaren to (France) CS Bourgoin
- (Scotland) Alan Perrie to (Scotland) Glasgow Hawks
- (Scotland) Murray Craig to (England) Exeter Chiefs

== Competitions ==
=== Pre-season and friendlies ===
==== Match 1 ====
4 August 1998

Glasgow Caledonians (Scotland)	24–32	(England) Richmond
Try: James Craig; Derrick Patterson; Derek Stark; Con: Tommy Hayes (3); Pen: Kevin McKenzie	Report; Analysis; Analysis	Try: Spencer Brown (2); Andy Moore; Laurent Cabannes; Martin Waite; Mel Deane; Con: Jim Hamilton-Smith

Hughenden Stadium
Attendance: 1500

Glasgow Caledonians:G Metcalfe; D Stark, C Simmers, I Jardine, J Craig; T Hayes, D Patterson; T Smith, K McKenzie, A Kittle, S Campbell, G Perrett, G Flockhart, M Waite, G Simpson. Replacements (all used) – F Stott, M Craig, R Kerr, G McIlwham, W Anderson, G Scott, J Shaw, J Manson.
Richmond: M Pini; N Waine, T Whitford, M Deane, S Brown; A Davies, A Moore; D McFarland, A Cuthbert, J Davies, B Cusack, C Gillies, C Palmer, B Clarke, A Vander. Replacements (all used) – B Shelbourne, D Chapman, M Fitzgerald, M Dixon, J Hamilton-Smith, L Cabannes, R Hutton.

==== Match 2 ====
22 August 1998

London Scottish (England)	29–27	(Scotland) Glasgow Caledonians
Try: Mike Watson (2); Kenny Milligan; Guy Manson-Bishop; Con: McAusland (3); Pen: McAusland	Report	Try: Stuart Grimes; Glenn Metcalfe; Derek Stark (2); Con: Rowen Shepherd; Tommy Hayes; Pen: Tommy Hayes

Athletic Ground, Richmond
Attendance: 1200
Referee: T Miller, RFU

London Scottish: I McAusland, K Milligan (J Turnbull 70), R Davies, J Bonney, I McIntyre (E Ramage 42), J Cameron (S Binns 30), G Easterby, P Johnstone (R Bijl 65), D Cummins, P Burnell (C Johnstone 49), E Jones, M Watson( M McAtamney 48), S Fenn (T Davies 38), C Tarbuck (G Manson-Bishop 59), R Hunter.

Glasgow Caledonians: G Metcalfe, S Longstaff (A Bulloch 21), R Shepherd, I Jardine, D Stark, T Hayes (C Simmers 30), F Stott, T Smith (G McIlwham 65), K McKenzie, W Anderson (A Kittle 56), S Grimes, S Campbell, J White, G Simpson, G MacKay (G Flockhart 56).

==== Match 3 ====
28 August 1998

Ulster (Ireland)	32–15	(Scotland) Glasgow Caledonians
Try: Tony McWhirter; Andy Matchett; Con: Simon Mason (2); Pen: Simon Mason (5); Drop: David Humphries	Preview; Report	Try: Chris Simmers; Derek Stark; Con: Chris Paterson; Pen: Chris Paterson

Ravenhill
Attendance: 4000
Referee: R. McDowell (Munster).

Ulster: S. Mason; J. Davis, S. McDowell (S. Coulter), M. McCall, J. Cunningham; D. Humphries, A. Matchett; J.Fitzpatrick, A. Clarke (R. Weir), G. Leslie (R. Irwin), M. Rea (M.Blair), G. Longwell, A. Ward, A. McWhirter (C. McCarey )

Glasgow Caledonians: R. Shepherd (A. Collins); A. Bulloch, C.Simmers, I. Jardine, D. Stark; C. Paterson, D. Patterson (F. Stott); G. McIlwham, C. Docherty (T. Smith), A. Kittle (W. Anderson), S. Campbell, G. Perrett (S. Grimes), J. White, G.Flockhart (J. Shaw), G. Simpson.

==== Match 4 ====
4 September 1998

Glasgow Caledonians (Scotland)	28–13	(Ireland) Connacht
Try: James Craig; Derek Stark; Gordon Simpson; Pen: Tommy Hayes (2)	Preview; Preview; Report	Try: Nigel Carolan

Bridgehaugh Park, Stirling
Attendance: 220
Referee: C Rees (England).

Glasgow Caledonians: R Shepherd; D Stark, C Simmers (I Jardine 74 mins), A Collins, J Craig; T Hayes, F Stott; T Smith, K McKenzie, W Anderson (A Kittle 68 mins), S Grimes, G Perrett, J White, J Shaw (G Mackay 72 mins) G Simpson (M Waite 72 mins).

Connacht: W Ruane; R Southam (A Reddan 52 mins), P Duignan, M Murphy, N Carolan; O Cobbe (S Allnutt 40 mins), C McGuinness (D Reddan 32 mins); J Maher, J McVeigh, M Finlay (J Screene 59 mins), G Heaslip, J Duffy, J Casserley, S McEntee (N Culleton 6 mins), I Dillon.

==== Match 5 ====
10 September 1998

Glasgow Caledonians (Scotland)	9–62	South Africa
Pen: Tommy Hayes (3)	Preview; Report	Try: Boome; Breyton Paulse (3); Fleck (2); Venter du Toit van Straaten; Skinstad; Con: van Straaten (6)

Firhill Stadium

Glasgow Caledonians: T Hayes; J Craig, I Jardine, J Leslie, D Stark; L Smith, D Patterson; G McIlwham, K McKenzie, A Kittle, S Campbell, G Perrett, J White, J Shaw, G Mackay.
Replacements - A Bulloch (used), C Simmers, C Little, M Wallace, G Flockhart (used), J Manson, G Scott (used)

South Africa: G du Toit; B Paulse, R Fleck, C Stewart, L Venter; B van Straaten, W Swanepoel; O le Roux, N Drotske, W Meyer, S Boome, J Trystman, C Krige, A Vos, B Skinstadt.
Replacements - D Kayser (used), R Markram (used), C Alcock (used), P Smit, O Nkumane (used), T van der Linde (used)

==== Match 6 ====
18 November 1998

Glasgow Caledonians (Scotland)	15–53	(Māori people) Māori All Blacks
Pen: Tommy Hayes (4); Drop: Luke Smith	Preview; Report; Reaction	Try: Meeuws; Muir; Ralph; McFarland; Osborne; Kerr; Con: Cashmore (4); Pen: Cashmore (5)

McDiarmid Park
Referee: Joel Judge (France)

Glasgow Caledonians: T Hayes; J Craig, C Simmers (A Collins 66 min), I Jardine, A Bulloch; L Smith (C Paterson 76 min), C Little; G McIlwham, G Scott, A Kittle (J Manson 67 min), S Campbell, G Perrett, G Flockhart (J Petrie 5 min), J Shaw, G Mackay.

Māori All Blacks: A Cashmore; G Osborne, C Ralph, D Gibson (N Berryman 52 min), J Kerr; R MacDonald (B Reihana 71 min), R Duggan; G Feek (L Lidgard 40 min), J Akurangi (S McFarland 68 min), K Meeuws, J Coe, D Waller, H Makiri (R Ford 75 min), G Marsh, D Muir.

==== Match 7 ====
24 November 1998

Glasgow Caledonians (Scotland)	41–22	Fiji
Try: Alan Kittle; Rob Wainwright; Derek Stark (2); Con: Luke Smith (3); Pen: Luke Smith (5)	Preview; Report	Try: Sewabu; A Naituyaga; F Lasagavibau; Con: N Little (2); Pen: Little

Firhill Stadium
Referee: Gerard Borreani (France).

Glasgow Caledonians: G Metcalfe; D Stark, A Collins, I Jardine, S Longstaff; L Smith (R Shepherd 69 mins), C Little; G McIlwham (J Manson 79 mins), G Scott, A Kittle (W Anderson 64 mins), S Campbell, G Perrett, R Wainwright, G Flockhart (M Waite 60 mins), G Mackay.

Fiji: W Tuisese; I Tikomaimakogai, V Satala, L Koroi (L Little 55 mins), F Lasagavibau; N Little, J Raulini (S Rabaka 59 mins); D Rouse, G Smith, M Taga (N Qoro 66 mins), I Tawake, S Raiwalui, A Naevo, K Sewabu, A Naituyaga.

=== European Champions Cup ===
The previous year's Scottish Inter-District Championship produced a tight finish and Glasgow were just pipped to first place by Caledonia Reds. The second place achieved in the Scottish Inter-District was enough for Glasgow to be entered in the Heineken Cup for the new season 1997–98.

The pool matches saw Glasgow grouped alongside London Wasps; with former player Kenny Logan now starring for the English side. Logan was to put Glasgow to the sword over the two matches, scoring 3 tries against his old team. Nevertheless, Glasgow did well enough to get out the group and snatch a quarter final play-off place. However they were soundly beaten by the Leicester Tigers and their matches against English opposition showed the gulf of professionalism that then existed between Scotland and England.

teams received in the pool matches:

- 2 points for a win
- 1 point for a draw

Key to colours
Winner of each pool advances to quarter-final stage
Advance to quarter-final playoffs

==== Pool 4 ====
Team	P	W	D	L	Tries for	Tries against	Try diff	Points for	Points against	Points diff	Pts
(France) Colomiers	6	4	0	2	22	10	12	176	121	55	8
(Wales) Pontypridd	6	3	0	3	13	16	−3	160	141	19	6
(Italy) Benetton Treviso	6	3	0	3	13	13	0	142	150	−8	6
(Scotland) Glasgow Caledonians	6	2	0	4	10	19	−9	121	187	−66	4

==== Results ====
===== Round 1 =====
20 September 1998
15:00

Glasgow Caledonians (Scotland)	21–43	(Wales) Pontypridd
Try: Glenn Metcalfe; James Craig; Con: Tommy Hayes; Pen: Tommy Hayes (3)	Report	Try: Dafydd James; Geraint O Lewis; Paul John; Geraint Lewis; Con: Neil Jenkins (4); Pen: Neil Jenkins (5)

Firhill Stadium
Attendance: 2,000
Referee: Nick Cousins (England)

===== Round 2 =====
26 September 1998
20:30

Treviso (Italy)	34–15	(Scotland) Glasgow Caledonians
Try: Leonardo Perziano (2); Wilhelmus Visser; Con: Francesco Mazzariol (2); Pen: Francesco Mazzariol (5)	Report	Pen: Rowen Shepherd x3 Tommy Hayes; Drop: Rowen Shepherd

Stadio Comunale di Monigo
Attendance: 1,100
Referee: Graham Hughes

===== Round 3 =====
10 October 1998
15:30

Colomiers (France)	34–16	(Scotland) Glasgow Caledonians
Try: David Skrela (2); Marc Biboulet; Stephane Peysson; Raphaël Bastide; Con: Laurent Labit (3); Pen: Laurent Labit	Report	Try: Shaun Longstaff; Con: Tommy Hayes; Pen: Tommy Hayes (3)

Stade Selery
Attendance: 3,000
Referee: Andrew Watson

===== Round 4 =====
18 October 1998
15:00

Glasgow Caledonians (Scotland)	40–27	(Italy) Treviso
Try: Glenn Metcalfe; Rowen Shepherd (2); James Craig; Martin Waite; Con: Tommy Hayes (3); Pen: Tommy Hayes (3)	Report	Try: Ivan Francescato; Wilhelmus Visser; Con: Luca Pavin; Pen: Luca Pavin (5)

Firhill Stadium
Attendance: 2,040
Referee: Gerard Borreani

===== Round 5 =====
1 November 1998
15:00

Glasgow Caledonians (Scotland)	26–17	(France) Colomiers
Try: Chris Simmers; Shaun Longstaff; Con: Luke Smith; Tommy Hayes; Pen: Luke Smith (2); Tommy Hayes (2)	Report	Try: Jean-Philippe Revallier; Stephane Peysson; Con: Laurent Labit (2); Pen: Laurent Labit

Firhill Stadium
Attendance: 2,000
Referee: Nigel Whitehouse

===== Round 6 =====
7 November 1998
17:30

Pontypridd (Wales)	32–3	(Scotland) Glasgow Caledonians
Try: Dafydd James; Geraint O. Lewis; Dale McIntosh; Con: Neil Jenkins; Pen: Neil Jenkins (5)	Report	Pen: Tommy Hayes

Sardis Road
Attendance: 5,500
Referee: Graham Hughes

=== Scottish Inter-District Championship ===
With the merging of the 4 districts into 2; now only Glasgow and Edinburgh were involved in a championship. Glasgow Caledonians and Edinburgh Reivers then fought it out in a renamed Tri-Series sponsored by Tennents Velvet.

Three matches were played between the clubs. Edinburgh won the series, beating Glasgow 2–1. A league table is shown for completeness. Both teams entered the next year's Heineken Cup.

==== 1998-99 League Table ====
Team	P	W	D	L	PF	PA	+/-	Pts
Edinburgh Reivers	3	2	0	1	97	32	+65	4
Glasgow Caledonians	3	1	0	2	32	97	-65	2

==== Results ====
===== Round 1 =====
13 September 1998

Edinburgh Reivers	17–19	Glasgow Caledonians
Try: Hugh Gilmour; Iain Fairley; Con: Duncan Hodge (2); Pen: Duncan Hodge	Report	Try: Rowen Shepherd; Con: Tommy Hayes; Pen: Tommy Hayes (4)

Easter Road
Referee: A Watson (Ireland)

===== Round 2 =====
25 October 1998

Glasgow Caledonians	10–47	Edinburgh Reivers
Try: Tommy Hayes; Con: Tommy Hayes; Pen: Tommy Hayes	Report	Try: Alan Tait x2 Tony Stanger x2 Cameron Murray; Duncan Hodge; Martin Leslie; Con: Craig Chalmers (2); Duncan Hodge; Pen: Craig Chalmers (2)

Rubislaw Playing Fields
Attendance: 2000
Referee: D Mene (France)

===== Round 3 =====
3 January 1999

Edinburgh Reivers	33–3	Glasgow Caledonians
Try: Cameron Mather; Duncan Hodge; John Kerr; Con: Duncan Hodge (3); Pen: Duncan Hodge (4)	Report	Pen: Luke Smith

Netherdale
Referee: C Thomas (Wales)

=== Welsh Rugby Union Challenge Cup ===
Both Glasgow Caledonians and Edinburgh Reivers were invited into the WRU's Challenge Cup; along with the South African provincial sides Northern Bulls and Gauteng Falcons and the Romania national side (in Glasgow's pool) and Natal, the Canada national side and the Georgia national side (in Edinburgh's pool).

The WRU constructed that year's tournament so that 8 Welsh teams are placed in two pools; 4 in each pool. The 4 Welsh sides in each pool then played the invited sides of that pool. The winners of each pool play a final; and the pool runners-up played a third place play-off. Hence Glasgow (and Edinburgh and other invited sides) only played Welsh opposition in their pools.

Depending on results, the invited sides then would only play each other if they qualified out of their pools. Going into their last matches both Glasgow and Edinburgh had a chance to secure their pool runners-up place. This would have meant a Glasgow - Edinburgh play-off in Wales! However Glasgow fell at the last hurdle. Although Edinburgh won their pool runners-up spot they then pulled out of the 3rd place play-off against Bridgend due to their players' exhaustion.

==== Round 1 ====
10 January 1999

Ebbw Vale (Wales)	22–33	(Scotland) Glasgow Caledonians
Try: Hawker; Olsen; Manley; Con: Jason Strange (2); Pen: Jason Strange	Preview; Report	Try: Derek Stark; John Shaw; Shaun Longstaff; John Leslie; Con: Tommy Hayes (2); Pen: Tommy Hayes (3)

Referee: G Simmonds (Cardiff)

==== Round 2 ====
27 January 1999
(postponed from 13 January 1999)

Bridgend (Wales)	10–8	(Scotland) Glasgow Caledonians
Try: Penalty try Con: Cull; Pen: Cull	Preview; Report	Try: Derrick Patterson; Pen: Luke Smith

Brewery Field
Referee: D Davies (Llandarach)

==== Round 3 ====
22 January 1999

Llanelli (Wales)	21–19	(Scotland) Glasgow Caledonians
Try: Madden; Scott Quinnell; Con: Stephen Jones; Pen: Stephen Jones (3)	Report	Try: Gordon Simpson (2); Shaun Longstaff; Con: Tommy Hayes (2)

Referee: H Lewis (WRU)

==== Round 4 ====
25 January 1999

Newport (Wales)	7–18	(Scotland) Glasgow Caledonians
Try: Penalty try Con: Connor	Preview; Report; Report	Try: Rob Wainwright; Luke Smith; Con: Luke Smith; Pen: Luke Smith (2)

Rodney Parade
Referee: Nigel Williams (Wales)

== Competitive debuts this season ==
A player's nationality shown is taken from the nationality at the highest honour for the national side obtained; or if never capped internationally their place of birth. Senior caps take precedence over junior caps or place of birth; junior caps take precedence over place of birth. A player's nationality at debut may be different from the nationality shown. Combination sides like the British and Irish Lions or Pacific Islanders are not national sides, or nationalities.

Players in BOLD font have been capped by their senior international XV side as nationality shown.

Players in Italic font have capped either by their international 7s side; or by the international XV 'A' side as nationality shown.

Players in normal font have not been capped at senior level.

A position in parentheses indicates that the player debuted as a substitute. A player may have made a prior debut for Glasgow Warriors in a non-competitive match, 'A' match or 7s match; these matches are not listed.

Tournaments where competitive debut made:

**Scottish Inter-District Championship**	**Welsh–Scottish League**	**WRU Challenge Cup**	**Celtic League**	**Celtic Cup**	**1872 Cup**	**Pro12**	**Pro14**	**Rainbow Cup**	**United Rugby Championship**	**European Challenge Cup**	**Heineken Cup / European Champions Cup**

Crosshatching indicates a jointly hosted match.

Number	Player nationality	Name	Position	Date of debut	Venue	Stadium	Opposition nationality	Opposition side	Tournament	Match result	Scoring debut
42	(Scotland)	**Tom Smith**	Prop	1998-09-13	Away	Easter Road	(Scotland)	Edinburgh	Scottish Inter-District Championship	Win	Nil
43	(Scotland)	**Kevin McKenzie**	Hooker	1998-09-13	Away	Easter Road	(Scotland)	Edinburgh	Scottish Inter-District Championship	Win	Nil
44	(Scotland)	Willie Anderson	Prop	1998-09-13	Away	Easter Road	(Scotland)	Edinburgh	Scottish Inter-District Championship	Win	Nil
45	(Scotland)	**Stuart Grimes**	Lock	1998-09-13	Away	Easter Road	(Scotland)	Edinburgh	Scottish Inter-District Championship	Win	Nil
46	(Scotland)	**Stewart Campbell**	Lock	1998-09-13	Away	Easter Road	(Scotland)	Edinburgh	Scottish Inter-District Championship	Win	Nil
47	(Scotland)	**Jason White**	No. 8	1998-09-13	Away	Easter Road	(Scotland)	Edinburgh	Scottish Inter-District Championship	Win	Nil
48	(New Zealand)	Aaron Collins	Centre	1998-09-13	Away	Easter Road	(Scotland)	Edinburgh	Scottish Inter-District Championship	Win	Nil
49	(Scotland)	**Rowen Shepherd**	Full Back	1998-09-13	Away	Easter Road	(Scotland)	Edinburgh	Scottish Inter-District Championship	Win	5 pts
50	(Scotland)	**Shaun Longstaff**	Wing	1998-09-13	Away	Easter Road	(Scotland)	Edinburgh	Scottish Inter-District Championship	Win	Nil
51	(Scotland)	**Rob Wainwright**	Flanker	1998-09-13	Away	Easter Road	(Scotland)	Edinburgh	Scottish Inter-District Championship	Win	Nil
52	(Scotland)	Gareth Flockhart	Flanker	1998-09-13	Away	Easter Road	(Scotland)	Edinburgh	Scottish Inter-District Championship	Win	Nil
53	(Scotland)	**Gordon Simpson**	No. 8	1998-09-20	Home	Firhill Stadium	(Wales)	Pontypridd	European Champions Cup	Loss	Nil
54	(Scotland)	**Derrick Patterson**	Scrum half	1998-09-20	Home	Firhill Stadium	(Wales)	Pontypridd	European Champions Cup	Loss	Nil
55	(Scotland)	Martin Waite	Flanker	1998-09-26	Away	Stadio Comunale di Monigo	(Italy)	Benetton Treviso	European Champions Cup	Loss	Nil
56	(South Africa)	Luke Smith	Fly half	1998-11-01	Away	Stade Michel Bendichou	(France)	US Colomiers	European Champions Cup	Loss	Nil
57	(Scotland)	**John Leslie**	Centre	1999-01-03	Away	Netherdale	(Scotland)	Edinburgh	Scottish Inter-District Championship	Loss	Nil
58	(Scotland)	**Jon Petrie**	Flanker	1999-01-03	Away	Netherdale	(Scotland)	Edinburgh	Scottish Inter-District Championship	Loss	Nil
59	(Scotland)	**John Manson**	Prop	1999-01-10	Away	Eugene Cross Park	(Wales)	Ebbw Vale	WRU Challenge Cup	Win	Nil
60	(Scotland)	**Graeme Beveridge**	Scrum half	1999-01-25	Away	Rodney Parade	(Wales)	Newport	WRU Challenge Cup	Win	Nil
61	(Scotland)	Gavin Scott	Hooker	1999-01-27	Away	Brewery Field	(Wales)	Bridgend	WRU Challenge Cup	Loss	Nil
