= 1997–98 Glasgow Warriors season =

Glasgow Warriors 1997 / 1998
- Ground: Scotstoun Stadium (Capacity: 10,000)
- Coach(es): (New Zealand) Kevin Greene to November 1997 (New Zealand) Keith Robertson from November 1997
- Captain: (Scotland) Gordon Bulloch
- Most caps: (Scotland) Gordon Bulloch (Scotland) Gordon McIlwham (Scotland) Guy Perrett (Scotland) Fergus Wallace (Scotland) Fraser Stott (Cook Islands) Tommy Hayes (Scotland) Craig Sangster (10)
- Top scorer: (Cook Islands) Tommy Hayes (103)
- Most tries: (Scotland) James Craig (6)
- League: 1997-98 Scottish Inter-District Championship
- 2nd (Runners Up)
Team kit

The 1997–98 season is the second in the history of the Glasgow Warriors as a professional side. During this season the young professional side competed as Glasgow Rugby.

This season saw Glasgow Rugby compete in the competitions: the Scottish Inter-District Championship and the European Champions Cup, the Heineken Cup.

== Season Overview ==
=== Disquiet grows ===
Notwithstanding the 'Gang of Four' pressing for the club teams to be used in Europe instead of the district teams, further disquiet was building against Kevin Greene's dual role as Glasgow Hawks coach and Glasgow Warriors coach. The matter was brought to a head when Greene signed Tommy Hayes for the Glasgow side and Kilmarnock RFC complained that they had not been given an opportunity to bid for the player; as one club team in the district would be assigned the player when not in use by the professional Glasgow side.

Hayes was later assigned the Glasgow Hawks club; Greene's club side.

=== European highs and lows ===
Getting out of the Heineken Cup pool stage was extremely positive for the Glasgow side. However the manner of the defeat in the play-off for the Quarter finals by Leicester Tigers brought further grist to the mill as far as the 'Gang of Four' were concerned. Such was the ease of the win by Leicester that one of their players Dean Richards went off-pitch for a toilet break in the middle of the match without the Tigers replacing him.

The result though probably wasn't helped by the prior announcement that the Leicester Tigers match would be Greene's last in charge of Glasgow. To the SRU this season's European results showed that their current model of professionalism wasn't working and they resolved to change the structure of the newly professional game in Scotland. The effects of this resolve were to be seen in the following season.

=== Ulster interest in Greene ===
Ulster Rugby made overtures to Kevin Greene about being their new Director of Rugby, straight after Glasgow's defeat of Ulster in the Challenge Cup. Greene however turned them down, preferring to go home to his native New Zealand. He had already agreed with Jim Telfer that he would act as an 'agent' for Glasgow Warriors and Scotland in New Zealand by helping out the training of the Silver Thistles. Glasgow later used Greene on the same basis for their 'academy side': the Glasgow Thistles.

"The job description from Ulster landed on my desk this week after they spoke to me at Scotstoun when the game was over. They said they needed a new direction," said Greene. "I am flattered, but I won't be taking up the position. I spoke to Jim Telfer this week and agreed that I will stay in Scotland to see Glasgow's game with Leicester through, and then go back to New Zealand. "We are keen that the Silver Thistles tourists carry on, and we are to investigate the possibility of taking coaches over there as well to learn what they do. I suppose, to some extent, I will be an agent for Scotland back home."

=== New coach ===
Another New Zealander was brought in to coach Glasgow Rugby. Keith Robertson was ear-marked by the SRU's Jim Telfer earlier in the year as a potential candidate for Glasgow when Robertson's Otago Highlanders team toured the UK. He took over Glasgow in November 1997.

=== Strength and fitness and the Elite Development Programme ===
David Jordan, the chief executive of GDRU, acknowledges: "The result against Leicester told us that we have still much to do. We were found wanting in a number of departments, particularly our overall fitness and strength. It is vital that we recognise where out weaknesses are."

Glasgow issued an action plan on how it planned to resolve those weaknesses. It stated: "The Glasgow and District Rugby Union will be aggressively looking beyond Scotland to identify players to enhance and improve the performance of the team. Priority will be given to identifying players with Scottish eligibility. The district will also take full advantage of the use of two non-EU international players."

"The GDRU will utilise the services of a weight training specialist. Every squad member will be given one-to-one training and will work to individually tailored programmes."

In other areas of physical conditioning the plan envisages that there will be a player appraisal programme. "It will be based on setting individual training, fitness and dietary targets. Players will be expected to do training outwith normal squad sessions and be responsible for achieving the targets set," says the action plan.

Glasgow's initial squad of players for next season will be selected next month and between then and March will be the start of what the plan calls the Elite Development Programme that will concentrate on the players who "have the physical and mental ability to represent Glasgow and the Scottish Rugby Union."

"This is the key to the long-term success of Scottish rugby," says the action plan which makes it clear that better identification of talent and an increase in playing numbers are priorities in the next few years.

== Team ==
=== Coaches ===
- Head coach: (New Zealand) Kevin Greene to November 1997; (New Zealand) Keith Robertson from November 1997
- Assistant coach: (New Zealand) Gordon Macpherson from November 1997
- Fitness coach: (Scotland) Ken MacEwen
- Physiotherapists: (Scotland) Sarah Mitchell and (Scotland) Alan Mackay

=== Staff ===
Chairman: Ken Crichton
Vice-chairman: George Blackie
Convenor / team M=manager: Hamish Fyfe
Chief executive: David Jordan
Administrative executive: Bill McMurtrie
Committee: Gordon Ash, Norry Boyle, Ewan Cameron, John Dyer, Alasdair Graham, Tom Morrice, Bill Nolan, Willie Talbot (SRU Championship Committee Representative), Dick Thomas (West of Scotland rugby Referees Society Representative)
Secretary: Victoria Mount

=== Squad ===
Hookers (Scotland) Gordon Bulloch (Scotland) Chris Docherty Props (Cook Islands) Mike Beckham (Scotland) Gary Isaac (Scotland) David Jamieson (Scotland) Alan Kittle (Scotland) Alan Perrie (England) Danny Porte (Scotland) Gordon McIlwham Locks (Scotland) Charles Afuakwah (Scotland) Stephen Begley (Scotland) Shade Munro (Scotland) Malcolm Norval (Scotland) Guy Perrett	Loose forwards (Scotland) Scott Hutton (Scotland) Gordon Mackay (Scotland) David McLeish (Scotland) Andrew Ness (Scotland) John Shaw (Scotland) Iain Sinclair (Scotland) Fergus Wallace (Scotland) Murray Wallace Half backs (Scotland) Fraser Stott (Scotland) Jamie Weston Stand offs (Cook Islands) Tommy Hayes (Scotland) Cameron Little (New Zealand) Erin Cossey	Centres (Scotland) Danny Ablett (Scotland) Alan Bulloch (New Zealand) Aaron Collins (Scotland) Ian Jardine (Scotland) Matt McGrandles (Scotland) James McLaren (Scotland) Chris Simmers Back three (Scotland) James Craig (Scotland) Gavin Fraser (Scotland) Gerry Hawkes (Scotland) Glenn Metcalfe (Scotland) Craig Sangster (Scotland) Derek Stark

=== Academy players ===
A 22 strong group of age-grade Glasgow District players – known as the Glasgow Thistles – were sent to New Zealand for rugby training under the aegis of Kevin Greene in February 1998.

The 22 Glasgow Thistles: Gillon Armstrong (Kilmarnock), Colin Bartwicki (East Kilbride), Stuart Bryce (Glasgow Southern), Stuart Caulfield (Dalziel), Scott Chassels (Glasgow Academy), Rory Couper (Ardrossan Academicals), Hugh Fulton (Glasgow Academy), Craig Hamilton (Wigtownshire), Rory Kerr (Strathendrick), Douglas Lyall (Hutchesons' GS), Richard Maxton (Stewart's Melville FP), Andrew McGeoch (Glasgow Academy), Ian McInroy (Garnock), Eric Milligan (Stewarton Academy and Kilmarnock), Iain Monaghan (Glasgow Southern), Craig Murdoch (Ayr), Euan Murray (Williamwood HS and Glasgow Southern), Chris Pothan (Kelvinside Academy), Colin Stewart (East Kilbride), Gordon Tyler (Ardrossan Academicals), Jan Vos (Glasgow Southern), Martin Yorston (Lenzie).

== Player statistics ==
During the 1997–98 season, Glasgow have used 29 different players in competitive games. The table below shows the number of appearances and points scored by each player.

Position	Nation	Name	Scottish Inter-District Championship			Heineken Cup			Total	
Position	Nation	Name	Apps (sub)	Tries	Points kicked	Apps (sub)	Tries	Points kicked	Apps (sub)	Total pts
HK	(Scotland)	Gordon Bulloch	3	1	0	7	1	0	10	10
HK	(Scotland)	Chris Docherty	0	0	0	(1)	0	0	(1)	0
PR	(Cook Islands)	Mike Beckham	1	0	0	2(2)	0	0	3(2)	0
PR	(Scotland)	Alan Kittle	2	0	0	5(2)	0	0	7(2)	0
PR	(Scotland)	Gordon McIlwham	3	0	0	7	0	0	10	0
PR	(England)	Danny Porte	0	0	0	(1)	0	0	(1)	0
LK	(Scotland)	Charles Afuakwah	0	0	0	2	0	0	2	0
LK	(Scotland)	Stephen Begley	0	0	0	3(1)	0	0	3(1)	0
LK	(Scotland)	Malcolm Norval	3	0	0	2	0	0	5	0
LK	(Scotland)	Guy Perrett	3	0	0	7	0	0	10	0
BR	(Scotland)	Gordon Mackay	(1)	0	0	1	0	0	1(1)	0
BR	(Scotland)	David McLeish	2(1)	0	0	5	0	0	7(1)	0
BR	(Scotland)	John Shaw	2	0	0	1(2)	1	0	3(2)	5
BR	(Scotland)	Iain Sinclair	1	0	0	6	0	0	7	0
BR	(Scotland)	Fergus Wallace	1(2)	0	0	3(4)	0	0	4(6)	0
BR	(Scotland)	Murray Wallace	3	0	0	5	1	0	8	5
SH	(Scotland)	Fraser Stott	3	0	0	7	1	0	10	5
FH	(Cook Islands)	Tommy Hayes	3	1	37	7	4	61	10	123
FH	(Scotland)	Cameron Little	0	0	0	(3)	1	2	(3)	7
CE	(Scotland)	Danny Ablett	0	0	0	1(1)	0	0	1(1)	0
CE	(Scotland)	Alan Bulloch	1	0	0	0	0	0	1	0
CE	(Scotland)	Ian Jardine	0	0	0	1	0	0	1	0
CE	(Scotland)	Matt McGrandles	2	0	0	7	2	0	9	10
CE	(Scotland)	Chris Simmers	3	1	0	5	0	0	8	5
WG	(Scotland)	James Craig	2	2	0	7	4	0	9	30
WG	(Scotland)	Derek Stark	3	1	0	7	1	0	10	10
FB	(Scotland)	Gavin Fraser	(2)	0	0	(2)	0	0	(4)	0
FB	(Scotland)	Glenn Metcalfe	1(1)	0	0	(3)	0	0	1(4)	0
FB	(Scotland)	Craig Sangster	3	0	0	7	0	0	10	0

== Staff movements ==
=== Coaches ===
==== Personnel in ====
- (New Zealand) Keith Robertson from (New Zealand) Highlanders
- (New Zealand) Gordon Macpherson from West of Scotland

==== Personnel out ====
- Kevin Greene returned to New Zealand

== Player movements ==
=== Academy promotions ===
None

=== Player transfers ===
==== In ====
- (Scotland) Gavin Fraser from (England) London Irish
- (Cook Islands) Tommy Hayes from (New Zealand) Waikato
- (Cook Islands) Mike Beckham from New Zealand Army rugby
- (Scotland) Matt McGrandles from (Scotland) Glasgow Hawks
- David Jamieson from West of Scotland
- (Scotland) Danny Ablett from (Scotland) Glasgow Hawks
- (New Zealand) Aaron Collins from West of Scotland
- (Scotland) Gerry Hawkes from (Scotland) Glasgow Hawks
- (Scotland) Gary Isaac from (Scotland) Kilmarnock RFC
- (New Zealand) Erin Cossey from (Scotland) Glasgow Southern RFC
- (Scotland) Chris Simmers from (Scotland) Edinburgh Rugby
- (Scotland) Scott Hutton from (Scotland) Glasgow Hawks
- (Scotland) Andrew Ness from (Scotland) Glasgow Hawks

==== Out ====
- (Scotland) Calum MacGregor retired
- (Scotland) Kenny Logan to (England) London Wasps
- (Scotland) George Breckenridge to (Scotland) Glasgow Hawks
- (Scotland) Harry Bassi to (Scotland) Glasgow Hawks
- (Scotland) Kenny Baillie to (Scotland) Glasgow Hawks
- (Scotland) Andrew Garry to (Scotland) Watsonians RFC
- (Scotland) James McLaren to (Scotland) Caledonia Reds
- David McVey to West of Scotland
- (Scotland) Brian Robertson to (Scotland) Stirling County
- (Scotland) John MacLeod to (Scotland) Glasgow Hawks

== Competitions ==
=== Pre-season and friendlies ===
==== Match 1 ====
10 August 1997

Glasgow (Scotland)	15–49	(England) London Scottish
Try: Alan Bulloch; Andrew Ness; Con: Erin Cossey; Pen: Cameron Little	Preview; Report	Try: Rhodri Davies; Thompson; Johnston; Allan; Hunter; Mick Watson; Con: Derrick Lee x 4 Jamie Cameron; Pen: Derrick Lee x 3

Braidholm, Giffnock
Referee: R Dickson (Madras College FP)

Glasgow – C Sangster (Stirling County); D Stark (Glasgow Hawks), A Bulloch (West of Scotland), C Simmers (Glasgow Hawks), J Craig (West of Scotland); C Little (Glasgow Hawks), F Stott (West of Scotland); G Isaac (Kilmarnock Falcons), G Bulloch (West of Scotland) captain, G McIlwham (Glasgow Hawks), S Begley (Glasgow Hawks), G Perrett (West of Scotland), F Wallace (Glasgow Hawks), D McLeish (West of Scotland), G Mackay (Glasgow Hawks). Replacements – J Weston (Watsonians) for Stott, M Norval (Stirling County) for Begley, G Metcalfe (Glasgow Hawks) for Stark, J McLaren (Stirling County) for A Bulloch, all 40 mins, A Perrie (Glasgow Hawks) for Isaac, A Ness (Glasgow Hawks) for Mackay, E Cossey (Glasgow Southern) for Little.

London Scottish – D Lee; K Milligan, R Davies, R Eriksson, G Thompson; J Cameron, S Cook; P Johnston, J Allan, P Burnell, E Jones, R Hunter, C Tarbuck, M Watson, S Holmes. Replacements – C Smith for Thompson (50 mins), C Morley for Cook (59), T Jankovich for Tarbuck (67), I McAusland for Cameron (68).

==== Match 2 ====
16 August 1997

Sale Sharks (England)	33–10	(Scotland) Glasgow
Try: Tom Beim x 3 David Erskine; Simon Mannix; Con: Simon Mannix x 4	Report	Try: Jamie Weston; Con: Cameron Little; Pen: Cameron Little

Referee: G Hughes (Manchester)

Sale Sharks – J Mallinder (captain); C Yates, J Baxendell, A Hadley, T Beim; S Mannix, R Smith; P Smith, S Diamond, A Smith, C Murphy, D Baldwin, P Sanderson, D Erskine, D O'Grady. Replacements: S Howarth, K Ellis, D Williamson, M Driver, M Kirk, A Morris.

Glasgow – C Sangster; D Stark, A Bulloch, I Jardine, G Metcalfe; C Little, F Stott; G Isaac, G Bulloch (captain), G McIlwham, M Norval, G Perrett, M Wallace, D McLeish, I Sinclair. Replacements: C Docherty, F Wallace, C Simmers, J McLaren, M McGrandles, J Craig, D Ablett, G Mackay, C Afuakwah, A Perrie, J Weston.

==== Match 3 ====
23 August 1997

West Hartlepool (England)	18–40	(Scotland) Glasgow
Try: ; Ponton; Botham; Con: Benson; Pen: Benson x 2	Preview; Report	Try: Tommy Hayes x 2 Jamie Weston; James Craig; Derek Stark; Gordon McIlwham; Con: Tommy Hayes x 2 Pen: Tommy Hayes x 2

Brierton Lane

West Hartlepool – Farrell; Cavey, Botham, Connolly, John; Benson, Nu'ualitia; Sparks, Challenor, Hathaway, Webb, Schrader, Hood, Ponton, Hyde. Replacements – Knowles for Benson, Peacock for Challenor, Jones for Cavey (all at half time).

Glasgow – Sangster; Stark, A Bulloch, Jardine, Craig; Hayes, Weston; McIlwham, G Bulloch, Beckham, Afuakwah, Perrett, M Wallace, McLeish, Sinclair. Replacements – Kittle for Beckham (60min), Simmers for Jardine (61), Stott for Weston (64), Ness for McLeish (72), Metcalfe for Craig (72), Jardine for Hayes (75).

==== Match 4 ====
28 August 1997

Caledonia Reds (Scotland)	16–28	(Scotland) Glasgow
Try: Murray Fraser; Con: Rowen Shepherd; Pen: Rowen Shepherd x 3	Report	Try: Tommy Hayes; Matt McGrandles; Fraser Stott; Con: Tommy Hayes x 2 Pen: Tommy Hayes x 3

Bridgehaugh Park, Stirling
Referee: Referee – A Ireland (Grangemouth).

Caledonia Reds – Caledonia Reds – Shepherd; Renton, Rouse, Carruthers, Longstaff; Easson, Black; Penman, Scott, Manson, White, Grimes, McIvor, Flockhart, Waite. Substitutes – Fraser for Carruthers (39m), Hayter for Waite (40), Herrington for Penman (40), Officer for Rouse (53), Penman for Manson (75).

Glasgow – Simmers; Stark, Bulloch, McGrandles, Metcalfe; Hayes, Stott; McIlwham, Bulloch, Beckham, Afuakwah, Perrett, F Wallace, McLeish, M Wallace. Shaw for McLeish. Substitutes – Kittle for McIlwham (40), Ablett for A Bulloch (65), Porte for Beckham, Docherty for G Bulloch.

==== Match 5 ====
5 December 1997

Glasgow (Scotland)	6–22	(Australia) ACT Brumbies
Pen: Tommy Hayes x 2	Report	Try: Sam Cordingley; Josh Birch; Craig McMullen x 2 Con: Robert Todd

Scotstoun Stadium
Referee: (France) R Duhau

Glasgow – Sangster; Fraser (temporary replacement Hawkes), Bulloch, Collins, Metcalfe; Hayes, Stott (Little); McIlwham (Simmers), Docherty, Beckham (Jamieson); Norval, Perrett; F Wallace (Mackay), M Wallace(capt), Shaw (Hutton).

ACT Brumbies – Kafer(capt); Nasalio, Swan, Birch, Todd; McMullen, Cordingley; Zammit, Paul, Moore, Morahan, Harrison, Plenty, Jacques, Fenukitau.

=== European Champions Cup ===
The previous year's Scottish Inter-District Championship produced a tight finish and Glasgow were just pipped to first place by Caledonia Reds. The second place achieved in the Scottish Inter-District was enough for Glasgow to be entered in the Heineken Cup for the new season 1997–98.

The pool matches saw Glasgow grouped alongside London Wasps; with former player Kenny Logan now starring for the English side. Logan was to put Glasgow to the sword over the two matches, scoring 3 tries against his old team. Nevertheless, Glasgow did well enough to get out the group and snatch a quarter final play-off place. However they were soundly beaten by the Leicester Tigers and their matches against English opposition showed the gulf of professionalism that then existed between Scotland and England.

In the pool matches teams received

- 2 points for a win
- 1 points for a draw

Key to colours
Winner of each pool advances to quarter-final stage
Advance to quarter-final playoffs

==== Pool 2 ====
Team	P	W	D	L	Tries for	Tries against	Try diff	Points for	Points against	Points diff	Pts
(England) Wasps	6	6	0	0	31	12	19	243	104	139	12
(Scotland) Glasgow	6	3	0	3	14	15	−1	132	167	−35	6
(Wales) Swansea	6	2	0	4	15	16	−1	157	161	−4	4
(Ireland) Ulster	6	1	0	5	6	23	−17	95	195	−100	2

==== Results ====
===== Round 1 =====
8 September 1997
19:00

Ulster (Ireland)	12–18	(Scotland) Glasgow
Pen: Stuart Laing x 3 Drop: Stuart Laing	Preview; Preview; Report; Report	Try: James Craig; Murray Wallace; Con: Tommy Hayes; Pen: Tommy Hayes x 2

Ravenhill
Attendance: 2,100
Referee: Clayton Thomas (Wales)

===== Round 2 =====
14 September 1997
15:00

Glasgow (Scotland)	22–46	(England) London Wasps
Try: Gordon Bulloch; Tommy Hayes x 2 Con: Tommy Hayes; Cameron Little; Pen: Tommy Hayes	Report	Try: Shane Roiser; Nick Greenstock; Kenny Logan; Andy Gomarsall; Chris Sheasby; Con: Gareth Rees x 5 Pen: Gareth Rees x 3

Scotstoun Stadium
Attendance: 3,500
Referee: Alan Lewis (Ireland)

===== Round 3 =====
21 September 1997
15:00

Glasgow (Scotland)	35–21	(Wales) Swansea
Try: Derek Stark; Matt McGrandles; James Craig; John Shaw; Con: Tommy Hayes x 3 Pen: Tommy Hayes x 3	Report	Try: Huw Thomas; Chris Anthony; Con: Arwel Thomas; Pen: Arwel Thomas x 3

Scotstoun Stadium
Attendance: 3,000
Referee: Ed Morrison (England)

===== Round 4 =====
28 September 1997
15:00

London Wasps (England)	43–5	(Scotland) Glasgow
Try: Nick Greenstock; Kenny Logan x2 Andy Gomarsall; Chris Sheasby; Joe Worsley; Con: Gareth Rees x 5 Pen: Gareth Rees	Preview; Report	Try: James Craig

Loftus Road Stadium
Attendance: 3,825
Referee: David McHugh (Ireland)

===== Round 5 =====
4 October 1997
14:15

Swansea (Wales)	30–22	(Scotland) Glasgow
Try: Scott Gibbs; Rhodri Jones; Con: Aled Williams; Pen: Aled Williams x 6	Report	Try: Matt McGrandles; Con: Tommy Hayes; Pen: Tommy Hayes x 5

St. Helen's
Attendance: 3,000
Referee: Gordon Black (Ireland)

===== Round 6 =====
12 October 1997
15:00

Glasgow (Scotland)	30–15	(Ireland) Ulster
Try: Tommy Hayes; Fraser Stott; Penalty Try; Con: Tommy Hayes x 3 Pen: Tommy Hayes	Preview; Report; Report	Pen: Stuart Laing x 5

Scotstoun Stadium
Attendance: 4,000
Referee: Gareth Simmonds (Wales)

===== Quarter final play-offs =====
1 November 1997
15:00

Leicester Tigers (England)	90–19	(Scotland) Glasgow
Try: Michael Horak x 4 Austin Healey; Will Greenwood; Leon Lloyd; Joel Stransky x3 Richard Cockerill x 2 Martin Corry; Dean Richards; Con: Joel Stransky x 10	Report	Try: James Craig; Tommy Hayes; Cameron Little; Con: Tommy Hayes x 2

Welford Road
Attendance: 6,500
Referee: Joel Dume (France)

=== Scottish Inter-District Championship ===
For 1997–98 season the Scottish Inter-District Championship was sponsored by Inter-City Trains. Hence the Championship became known as the Inter-City and the Cup won became the Inter-City Cup.

==== 1997–98 League Table ====
Team	P	W	D	L	PF	PA	+/-	Pts
Edinburgh	3	2	0	1	76	55	+21	4
Glasgow	3	2	0	1	67	49	+18	4
Caledonia Reds	3	2	0	1	49	54	−5	4
Border Reivers	3	0	0	3	34	68	−34	0

==== Results ====
===== Round 1 =====
19 October 1997

Glasgow	36–20	Edinburgh
Try: James Craig x 2 Tommy Hayes; Con: Tommy Hayes x 3 Pen: Tommy Hayes x 5	Report	Try: Ally McLean; Pen: Ally McLean x 5

Scotstoun Stadium
Referee: I Ramage (Berwick)

===== Round 2 =====
24 October 1997

Border Reivers	9–17	Glasgow
Pen: Craig Chalmers x 3	Report	Try: Derek Stark; Pen: Tommy Hayes x 4

Philiphaugh, Selkirk
Referee: J Fleming (Boroughmuir)

===== Round 3 =====
4 January 1998

Caledonia Reds	20–14	Glasgow
Try: John Manson; Dave McIvor; Con: Rowen Shepherd x 2 Pen: Rowen Shepherd x 2	Report	Try: Chris Simmers; Gordon Bulloch; Con: Tommy Hayes x 2

Rubislaw Playing Fields
Attendance: 2000
Referee: J Fleming (Boroughmuir)

== Competitive debuts this season ==
A player's nationality shown is taken from the nationality at the highest honour for the national side obtained; or if never capped internationally their place of birth. Senior caps take precedence over junior caps or place of birth; junior caps take precedence over place of birth. A player's nationality at debut may be different from the nationality shown. Combination sides like the British and Irish Lions or Pacific Islanders are not national sides, or nationalities.

Players in BOLD font have been capped by their senior international XV side as nationality shown.

Players in Italic font have capped either by their international 7s side; or by the international XV 'A' side as nationality shown.

Players in normal font have not been capped at senior level.

A position in parentheses indicates that the player debuted as a substitute. A player may have made a prior debut for Glasgow Warriors in a non-competitive match, 'A' match or 7s match; these matches are not listed.

Tournaments where competitive debut made:

**Scottish Inter-District Championship**	**Welsh–Scottish League**	**WRU Challenge Cup**	**Celtic League**	**Celtic Cup**	**1872 Cup**	**Pro12**	**Pro14**	**Rainbow Cup**	**United Rugby Championship**	**European Challenge Cup**	**Heineken Cup / European Champions Cup**

Crosshatching indicates a jointly hosted match.

Number	Player nationality	Name	Position	Date of debut	Venue	Stadium	Opposition nationality	Opposition side	Tournament	Match result	Scoring debut
32	(Cook Islands)	**Mike Beckham**	Prop	1997-09-08	Away	Ravenhill Stadium	(Ireland)	Ulster	European Champions Cup	Win	Nil
33	(Scotland)	Guy Perrett	Lock	1997-09-08	Away	Ravenhill Stadium	(Ireland)	Ulster	European Champions Cup	Win	Nil
34	(Scotland)	Iain Sinclair	Flanker	1997-09-08	Away	Ravenhill Stadium	(Ireland)	Ulster	European Champions Cup	Win	Nil
35	(Cook Islands)	**Tommy Hayes**	Fly half	1997-09-08	Away	Ravenhill Stadium	(Ireland)	Ulster	European Champions Cup	Win	8 pts
36	(Scotland)	Matt McGrandles	Centre	1997-09-08	Away	Ravenhill Stadium	(Ireland)	Ulster	European Champions Cup	Win	Nil
37	(Scotland)	Chris Simmers	Centre	1997-09-08	Away	Ravenhill Stadium	(Ireland)	Ulster	European Champions Cup	Win	Nil
38	(Scotland)	Alan Kittle	Prop	1997-09-08	Away	Ravenhill Stadium	(Ireland)	Ulster	European Champions Cup	Win	Nil
39	(Scotland)	Danny Ablett	(Centre)	1997-09-21	Home	Scotstoun Stadium	(Wales)	Swansea	European Champions Cup	Win	Nil
40	(Scotland)	Gavin Fraser	Centre	1997-10-04	Away	St. Helen's	(Wales)	Swansea	European Champions Cup	Win	Nil
41	(Scotland)	Chris Docherty	Hooker	1997-11-01	Away	Welford Road Stadium	(England)	Leicester Tigers	European Champions Cup	Loss	Nil

== Sponsorship ==
- Dundas & Wilson
- Multi Metals Aluminium
- O'Rourke Scotland Ltd.

=== Official kit supplier ===
Canterbury
