= 1998–99 Scottish Inter-District Championship =

Rugby union competition

- Countries: Scotland
- Champions: Edinburgh Reivers
- Runners-up: Glasgow Caledonians
- Matches played: 3

The 1998–99 Scottish Inter-District Championship was a rugby union competition for Scotland's professional district teams. With the merging of the 4 districts into 2; now only Glasgow and Edinburgh were involved in the Scottish Inter-District Championship. Glasgow Caledonians and Edinburgh Reivers then fought it out in a renamed Tri-Series sponsored by Tennents Velvet.

Three matches were played between the clubs. Edinburgh won the series, beating Glasgow 2-1. A league table is shown for completeness. Both teams entered the next year's Heineken Cup.

== 1998-99 League Table ==
Team	P	W	D	L	PF	PA	+/-	Pts
Edinburgh Reivers	3	2	0	1	97	32	+65	4
Glasgow Caledonians	3	1	0	2	32	97	-65	2

== Results ==
=== Round 1 ===
13 September 1998

Edinburgh Reivers	17 – 19	Glasgow Caledonians
Try: Hugh Gilmour; Iain Fairley; Con: Duncan Hodge x 2 Pen: Duncan Hodge	Report	Try: Rowen Shepherd; Con: Tommy Hayes; Pen: Tommy Hayes x 4

Easter Road
Referee: A Watson (Ireland)

=== Round 2 ===
25 October 1998

Glasgow Caledonians	10 – 47	Edinburgh Reivers
Try: Tommy Hayes; Con: Tommy Hayes; Pen: Tommy Hayes	Report	Try: Alan Tait x2 Tony Stanger x2 Cameron Murray; Duncan Hodge; Martin Leslie; Con: Craig Chalmers x 2 Duncan Hodge; Pen: Craig Chalmers x 2

Rubislaw Playing Fields
Attendance: 2000
Referee: D Mene (France)

=== Round 3 ===
3 January 1999

Edinburgh Reivers	33 – 3	Glasgow Caledonians
Try: Cameron Mather; Duncan Hodge; John Kerr; Con: Duncan Hodge x 3 Pen: Duncan Hodge x 4	Report	Pen: Luke Smith

Netherdale
Referee: C Thomas (Wales)
