= 1997–98 Scottish Inter-District Championship =

Rugby union competition

- Countries: Scotland
- Champions: Edinburgh Rugby
- Runners-up: Glasgow Warriors
- Matches played: 6

The 1997–98 Scottish Inter-District Championship was a rugby union competition for Scotland's professional district teams. For 1997-98 season the Scottish Inter-District Championship was sponsored by Inter-City Trains. Hence the Championship became known as the Inter-City and the Cup won became the Inter-City Cup.

== 1997-98 League Table ==
Team	P	W	D	L	PF	PA	+/-	Pts
Edinburgh	3	2	0	1	76	55	+21	4
Glasgow	3	2	0	1	67	49	+18	4
Caledonia Reds	3	2	0	1	49	54	-5	4
Border Reivers	3	0	0	3	34	68	-34	0

== Results ==
=== Round 1 ===
17 October 1997

Border Reivers	15 – 20	Caledonian Reds
Try: Nicol; Stanger; Con: Aitchison; Pen: Welsh	Report	Try: Patterson; Pen: McKenzie; Shepherd x 4

Riverside Park, Jedburgh
Referee: J.R. Dickson (Madras FP)

19 October 1997

Glasgow	36 – 20	Edinburgh
Try: James Craig x 2 Tommy Hayes; Con: Tommy Hayes x 3 Pen: Tommy Hayes x 5	Report	Try: Ally McLean; Pen: Ally McLean x 5

Scotstoun Stadium
Referee: I Ramage (Berwick)

=== Round 2 ===
24 October 1997

Border Reivers	9 – 17	Glasgow
Pen: Craig Chalmers x 3	Report	Try: Derek Stark; Pen: Tommy Hayes x 4

Philiphaugh, Selkirk
Referee: Jim Fleming (Boroughmuir)

26 October 1997

Edinburgh	25 – 9	Caledonia Reds
Try: Dall; Burns; Pen: Hodge x 5	Report	Pen: Shepherd x 3

Inverleith Park
Referee: C Muir (Langholm)

=== Round 3 ===
4 January 1998

Caledonia Reds	20 – 14	Glasgow
Try: John Manson; Dave McIvor; Con: Rowen Shepherd x 2 Pen: Rowen Shepherd x 2	Report	Try: Chris Simmers; Gordon Bulloch; Con: Tommy Hayes x 2

Rubislaw Playing Fields
Attendance: 2000
Referee: Jim Fleming (Boroughmuir)

4 January 1998

Edinburgh	31 – 10	Border Reivers
Try: Cameron Glasgow; D Hodge; Blair; Meyer; McLean; Con: D Hodge x 3	Report	Try: Scott Nichol; Con: Craig Chalmers; Pen: Craig Chalmers

Inverleith Park
Referee: J Pearson

== Matches outwith the Championship ==
=== Trial matches ===
7 January 1998

Blues Trial	38 - 33	Reds Trial
	Preview; Report

Myreside Stadium

Blues:
Reds:
