= Gary Isaac =

Scottish rugby union player

- Born: Gary Ronald Isaac; 15 February 1966 (age 60) Dufftown, Scotland
- Height: 6 ft 1 in (1.85 m)
- Weight: 113 kg (17 st 11 lb)
- School: Elgin High School, Moray

Rugby union career
- Position: Loosehead Prop
Amateur team(s)
Years	Team	Apps	(Points)
- Moray
–	Gala		
–	Kilmarnock RFC		
Senior career
Years	Team	Apps	(Points)
1997- 98	Glasgow Warriors	0	(0)
Provincial / State sides
Years	Team	Apps	(Points)
- South
International career
Years	Team	Apps	(Points)
1990	Scotland A		
1993	Scotland	1	

Gary Isaac (born 15 February 1966 in Dufftown, Scotland) is a former Scotland international rugby union player. He played for Glasgow Warriors at the Loosehead Prop position. His rugby career spanned the amateur and professional era. He was President of Gala 2022–2024.

== Rugby Union career ==
=== Amateur career ===
He began playing for amateur club Moray.

He played for amateur club Gala and Kilmarnock Falcons.

=== Provincial and professional career ===
He also represented the amateur provincial district side South.

He was included in the professional provincial Glasgow side of 1997-98 season. He played in two pre-season friendlies: the first against London Scottish on 10 August 1997; and the second against Sale Sharks on 16 August 1997.

=== International career ===
Isaac has a Scotland A Cap, but he is one of around 30 players who would be retrospectively also awarded a full senior cap if the SRU decides that Scotland duty on international tour should be worthy enough. Scotland's non cap international games include: Argentina (3), Canada, Fiji (2), Japan (4), Portugal, Spain (4), Tonga (2), USA, Western Samoa, Zimbabwe (5).

The SRU made the decision on 15 August 2023. Isaac's cap against Fiji in Suva on 29 May 2023 would be counted as a full international. Hence Isaac was awarded a full senior Scotland cap. He is Scotland cap no. 1193.

=== Administrative career ===
Isaac was a Director of Rugby at Gala. He then held the position of Vice President, before becoming President of the club in 2022 for a two season tenure.
