= Moray RFC =

Scottish rugby union club, based in Elgin

(Scotland) Moray RFC
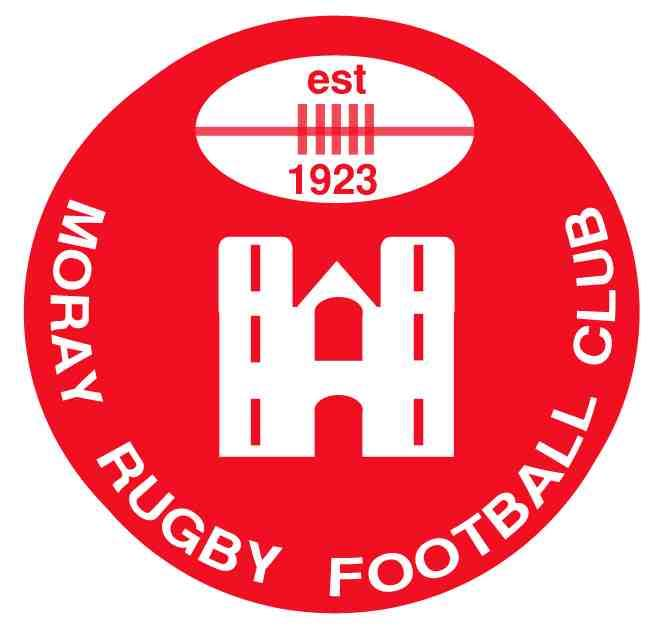
- Full name: Moray Rugby Football Club
- Founded: 1923
- Location: Elgin, Moray, Scotland
- Ground: Morriston Park
- Coach: Barry Grimwood
- Captain: Lewis Higgins
- League: Caledonia Division One North
- 2025–26: Scottish National League Division Four, 9th of 9 (relegated)
Team kit

Official website
- www.morayrfc.co.uk

Moray Rugby Football Club is a rugby union club from the city of Elgin, Moray that compete in the Caledonia Division One North. Moray also have a 2xv that competes in the BT Caledonia 3 North League. Moray has a number of youth teams taken from different age groups including micros and minis, S1 and S2, Under-16, Under-18 team. They play their rugby at Morriston Park in Elgin, Moray.

== History ==
The first attempt to introduce rugby into such a strong soccer stronghold as Elgin was in 1903 by the then rector of Elgin Academy. It was, however, not long before the oval ball was forced to give way to the round one.

Twenty years and World War 1 elapsed before a second attempt was made, again by a rector of Elgin Academy, Iain Graham Andrew. The formation of the Moray Rugby Club took place on 3 March 1923 at a meeting in the drillhall in Elgin. Mr George C. Christie was elected as president. It was agreed that it was feasible to form a club and application was sent to the Scottish Rugby Union to become an affiliated member.

In September 1923 the town council approved the use of part of the local Cooper Park for the game of rugby by the club. The first match took place against Inverness Highland when Moray won 14 – 5. In these early days, the opposition came from Highland, Ross-shire, and the Army sides. The club adopted the colours of Elgin Academy – Red and White shirts with Navy Blue shorts.

In 1925 the Brin Cup was donated for competition among the clubs in the North. Up until the outbreak of war in 1939, Moray went on to win this cup several times.

After hostilities ceased in 1945, the club reconvened in September 1946 with Dr Thow as president and a dentist called George Cusetter as captain. The number of Naval and R.A.F. personnel stationed around the Moray area gave the club many more teams to play and also helped to improve the standard of play.

Elgin Academy provided a nursery, and some of the senior schoolboys often played for the school in the morning and for Moray in the afternoon.

In 1960, the club moved their playing field to Morriston Park and was able to field two teams.

In 1973, the club celebrated its 50th anniversary as several internationalists played for the presidents XV against the Moray Select. Dr. J.R.S. Innes, then Vice President of the Scottish Rugby Union, proposed a toast to the club at the official dinner after the game.

In 1975-76 the club joined the S.R.U. Schweppe League in the 7th division and, by the end of the season, were promoted to the 6th division. During the club's peak in the early 1980s, Moray reached the 5th division and ran 3 XV's and a colts side.

The clubhouse was opened later, accompanied by a special game between the Presidents XV Select and the North Midlands Select on Sunday 25 October 1985. Special permission was obtained from the Scottish Rugby Union to play on a Sunday. After the game, the clubhouse was opened by W.L. CONNON, the Vice President of the S.R.U.

In recent years, Moray has narrowly missed out on promotion to BT Caledonia Division 1 on a number of occasions. In 2016-17 Moray finished 3rd in the league missing out on promotion to eventual champions Banff RFC. Despite this setback, Moray won the BT Caledonia North Regional Bowl when they defeated fierce local rivals RAF Lossiemouth 8–7. Moray also missed out on the opportunity to play at Murrayfield after a semifinal defeat against Portobello in the National Bowl.

In 2017–18, for the first time in over 15 years, Moray were able to field a 2nd XV which entered BT Caledonia Division 3.

=== 2016-17 season ===
Moray started the 2016–17 season by winning 9 out of their first 10 fixtures. Morriston proved to be a fortress for the Elgin men, as they spent the first half of the season unbeaten at their riverside home. The long winter break caused to be problematic for Moray as their form dipped after the new year. After some damaging results, in particular narrow defeats to eventual champions Banff and a last-minute defeat to Aberdeen Grammar 2xv, Moray finished 3rd, therefore missing out on promotion. The season was new head coach Barry Grimwood's first and saw Club Captain John Westmacott step down from the role after three seasons wearing the armband. Hulking No 8 John Stuart won the club's player of the year, while Centre Harvey Freeman finished up as top Try scorer. Winger Connor McWilliam finished as top points scorer after a consistent season with the right boot.

Despite the late-season collapse in the league, the cup competitions provided Moray with silverware for the first time in nearly 5 years. Moray advanced to the final of the Caledonia North Regional Bowl, where they faced local rivals RAF Lossiemouth. In a tense and dramatic final, Moray scored a last-minute penalty, courtesy of veteran Fly Half, Chris Clarke. Lossiemouth had initially taken the lead from a penalty, before John Stuart scored a try to make it 5-3 heading into the last quarter. A second Lossiemouth penalty saw the Owls take the lead before Clarke's penalty and Moray winning the bowl. After their win, Moray were entered into the Caledonia national bowl but were eventually knocked out at the semi-final stage by Edinburgh-based Portobello. The Edinburgh side ran out 17–10 winners.

=== 2017-18 season ===
1xv

The 2017–18 season saw several changes within the 1xv squad. There were several departures with Flanker Will Vernon and Winger Connor McWilliam leaving due to attendance at University, while centre Leon Keirl left for RAF Lossiemouth. Long-serving hooker Lewis Higgins was named as new club captain, while his front row compatriots Mark Taylor and Nathan Gilmore were named as vice captains. The club also saw the return of veteran lock forward Callum Purcell, while Irish Flanker Stefan O Tobain joined the club. Fullback Callum Wright also returned after leaving the British Army.

Moray currently sit 2nd in the league. They have been defeated only twice, against Deeside and bitter rivals Highland 2xv. They remain the only team to so far beat runaway league leaders Ellon and currently sit 9 points behind the North Aberdeenshire team. Wing Lewis Scott, a converted forward, is the leading try scorer with 11 tries, while Callum Wright leads in points scored.

The cup competition has been less successful as Moray were forced to withdraw from the 2017–18 Caledonia National Shield due to players being unavailable.

2xv

For the first time in over 15 years, Moray were able to field a 2xv team that entered BT Caledonia Division 3. Utility forward, Matthew Lackie was named Captain, while former front row, Richard Burgin was named head coach. With a largely new and returning team, the season has been a struggle, and Moray currently sit 10th, third from bottom.

== Staff and players ==
=== Committee ===
|Club President - Fraser Andrews

|Vice President - James Taylor

|Treasurer      - Aileen Phillips

|Secretary      - Yvonne Stuart

|Sponsorship    - Mark Dunscombe

|Press Officer  - Graham Stables

=== 1st XV ===
|Head Coach/Backs Coach         - Cameron Hughes
|Assistant Coach/Forward Coach  - Doug Cooper
|Team Manager                   - Gregor Hands
|Team Physio                    - Matt Thomas
|Captain                        - Marc Higgins
|Vice Captain                   - Fergus Nicol

Squad

|Lewis Higgins              - Hooker
|Jordan Walton              - Hooker
|Mark Taylor                - Prop
|Nathan Gilmore             - Prop
|Stephen Reid               - Prop
|Connor Duncan              - Lock
|David Clarke               - Lock/Flanker
|John Westmacott            - Lock
|Callum Purcell             - Lock
|Chris Robottom             - Flanker/Hooker
|Marc Higgins               - Flanker/Hooker
|Neil Wiseman               - Flanker/No 8
|Ruraidh Mckessack-Leitch   - Flanker
|Stefan O Tobain            - Flanker
|Ross Joy                   - No 8
|John Stuart                - No 8/Flanker
|Callum Watson              - Scrum Half
|Gregor Hands               - Scrum Half
|Jonny Haslam               - Fly Half
|Chris Clarke               - Fly Half/Centre
|Francois Du Toit           - Centre/Fly Half
|Alex Stronach              - Centre
|Ben Roberts                - Centre
|Cameron Renton             - Centre
|Harvey Freeman             - Centre
|Andrew McBean              - Wing/Centre/Fullback
|Kieran Young               - Wing
|Lewis Scott                - Wing
|Aaron Gilmore              - Wing
|Callum Wright              - Fullback

== Moray Sevens ==
The club run the Moray Sevens tournament. Entrants play for the Elchies Cup.

== Honours ==
- Moray Sevens
  - Champions: 1985, 1986, 1988, 1996
- Aberdeen and District League Sevens
  - Champions: 1985
- Highland Sevens
  - Champions: 1929, 1930, 1987
- Caithness Sevens
  - Champions: 1981, 1984
- Ross Sutherland Sevens
  - Champions: 1975, 1976, 1977, 1980, 1981, 1983, 1989, 1991
- Kirkcaldy Sevens
  - Champions: 1985
- Howe of Fife Sevens
  - Champions: 1983
- Caledonia North Bowl
  - Champions: 2016–17

== Notable players ==
=== North and Midlands ===
The following former Moray players have represented North and Midlands at provincial level.

- (Scotland) I. A. Sutherland

=== Scotland ===
The following former Moray players have represented Scotland at international level.

- (Scotland) Gary Isaac
