= Waysiders Drumpellier =

Scottish rugby union club, based in Coatbridge

(Scotland) Waysiders Drumpellier
- Full name: Waysiders Drumpellier Rugby Football Club
- Union: Scottish Rugby Union
- Founded: 1993; 32 years ago
- Location: Coatbridge, Scotland
- Ground: Langloan
- League: West Division Two
- 2019–20: West Division Three, 8th of 10
Team kit

Waysiders Drumpellier is a rugby union side based in Coatbridge, North Lanarkshire, Scotland. The club was founded in 1993 by the merger of Waysiders RFC and Drumpellier RFC. They play their home games at Langloan in Coatbridge.

== History ==
Waysiders Drumpellier was born in 1993 for the 1993–94 season. It was a merger of two sides:- Waysiders RFC of Airdrie; and Drumpellier of Coatbridge.

The merger made Waysiders Drumpellier the rugby club with the largest school catchment area in Scotland; featuring 7 Secondary Schools and 52 Primary Schools.

The club run a 1st and 2nd XV as well as girls and boys sides. They also plan a rugby academy. The club had a women's side; it fell away, though the club is keen to re-instate this. However former Waysider Drumpellier players Tanya Griffiths, Emma Waugh, Heather Law, Lauren Miller and Jennifer Miller have all went on to represent Scotland.

The club recently secured over £108,000 in funding from the SRU and Sport Scotland for new changing rooms to allow for boys, girls, men and women. They have also received funding from Ross and Liddell's Community Bursary Scheme.

== Waysiders Drumpellier Sevens ==
The club runs the Waysiders Drumpellier Sevens. The tournament started in 1994. Before this Drumpellier RFC ran the Drumpellier Sevens until 1993.

== Notable former players ==
=== Men ===
==== Scotland 'A' ====
The following former Waysiders Drumpellier players represented Scotland 'A'.

- (Scotland) John Shaw

==== Glasgow Warriors ====
The following former Waysiders Drumpellier players represented Glasgow Warriors.

- (Scotland) John Shaw

=== Women ===
==== Scotland ====
The following former Waysiders Drumpellier players represented Scotland.

- (Scotland) Tanya Griffiths
- (Scotland) Heather Law
- (Scotland) Jennifer Miller

== Honours ==
- West Division 3
  - Champions: 2018-19
- McLaren HSFP Sevens
  - Champions: 1996
