= Elgin High School, Moray =

Coordinates: 57°38′9″N 3°19′16″W

Elgin High School

Location
- Edgar Road; Elgin, Moray, IV30 6UD; Scotland

Information
- Established: 1978; 48 years ago
- Head teacher: Hugh McCulloch
- Staff: 66.3
- Enrolment: 796
- Website: sites.google.com/view/elginhigh/home

Elgin High School, located on Edgar Road in Elgin, Moray, Scotland, is a secondary school

== The School ==
Opened in August 1978, Elgin High School is one of two secondary schools in Elgin, the other being Elgin Academy. It serves pupils in S1-6 from across a range of backgrounds and abilities. The House System consists of Arran, Harris, Iona, Jura, and Whiskey. Elgin High's catchment area traditionally lies to the south of the railway line, encompassing New Elgin and outlying villages. The main feeder primary schools are Greenwards, Mosstowie, Linkedwood and New Elgin. The school has an Additional Support Needs team that caters for pupils with profound and complex learning difficulties. Elgin High School maintains strong links with the local community and is often involved in fundraising and charity events. The school was inspected successfully by HMI (Education Scotland) in 2011.

== The Building ==
The school is located on the edge of New Elgin with a semi-rural setting, with the original building opening in 1978.

By late 2011 the condition of the school building was reckoned to be the worst in Moray. In September 2012, the school was included in a building replacement programme announced by the Scottish Government, with a new school to be built on the existing site. In February 2015 the local authority approved the plans. A £30 million replacement building opened in October 2017, with the former building demolished to provide space for an artificial pitch. There is also a separate block containing the PE department and fitness suite. Facilities include a library, drama studio, large games hall, gymnasium, fitness suite and spacious atrium area which is often used for assemblies as well as social events.

In July 2022, with pupil numbers rising to 848, extra temporary classrooms were authorised to provide 66 spaces which are expected to be in place by October, ahead of a planned building extension.

== Headmasters ==
- Bill Hope 1978-2003
- Andrew Simpson 2003-2016
- Hugh McCulloch 2016-

== Global Citizenship ==
In 2009, Elgin High was one of eight schools in Scotland to receive the International Schools Award for its global links and fundraising efforts. The school has a partnership with Mukonchi High School, Zambia, and regular exchange visits are organised between the two schools. The school received further recognition for its global links by winning another International Schools Award in 2016.

== Notable Former Pupils ==
- Richard Foster - Aberdeen, Rangers and Bristol City footballer.
- Gary Isaac - Former Gala and Scotland rugby player.
