= David Jamieson (rugby union) =

Scottish rugby union player

- Born: David A. Jamieson Scotland
- Height: 6 ft 2 in (1.88 m)
- Weight: 130 kg (20 st 7 lb)

Rugby union career
- Position: Tighthead Prop
Amateur team(s)
Years	Team	Apps	(Points)
- West of Scotland
–	Stirling County		
–	Club Olympique Creusot Bourgogne		
–	West of Scotland		
–	Ayr RFC		
–	Glasgow Hutchesons Aloysians		
–	Falkirk RFC		
–	Grangemouth Stags		
Senior career
Years	Team	Apps	(Points)
1997-98	Glasgow Warriors	2	(0)
International career
Years	Team	Apps	(Points)
- Scotland U21

David Jamieson (born in Scotland) is a Scottish former rugby union player who played for Glasgow Warriors at the tighthead prop position, although he can also play hooker.

== Rugby Union career ==
=== Amateur career ===
Jamieson's rugby career spanned the amateur and professional era. In 1995 before professionalism was introduced in Scotland – Scotland would take up professional rugby a year later for the 1996–97 season – he was playing for West of Scotland. He subsequently signed for the Glasgow Warriors.

Whilst not involved with the professional provincial Glasgow side in the 1997–98 season, Jamieson played amateur rugby with Stirling County.

In 2000, he was back at West of Scotland and played at the opening of West's new stand at Burnbrae. However at the start of the 2000–01 season, following West's demotion to Division 2, he was one of 14 players that staged a walk-out of the club. He then signed for Ayr RFC.

By 2002, Jamieson was playing at Glasgow Hutchesons Aloysians. but they were also relegated to Division 2 in 2005.

In 2010, the prop was now playing at Falkirk RFC

By 2013, Jamieson was playing for the Grangemouth Stags. They played in the RBS Bowl Final against Oban Lorne that year.

=== Professional and provincial career ===
In 1995 he was also being selected for the Under 21 Glasgow District side They won the Championship in 1995-96. By the end of 1995, Jamieson was on the bench for the full Glasgow District side.

Jamieson played for Glasgow in the 1997–98 season. He was on the bench in the pre-season friendly match against the Australian Super Rugby side Brumbies. He came on for Mike Beckham at Tighthead Prop.

In 1999 he was signed by Le Creusot-Montchainin, now Club Olympique Creusot Bourgogne.

=== International career ===
He played for Scotland Under 21s against Ireland at Blackrock in 1996, and against France.
