= Gavin Scott (rugby union) =

Scottish rugby union player

- Born: Gavin William Scott; 19 September 1974 (age 52) Dundee, Scotland
- Height: 5 ft 9 in (1.75 m)
- Weight: 95 kg (14 st 13 lb; 209 lb)
- University: Edinburgh University

Rugby union career
- Position: Hooker
Amateur team(s)
Years	Team	Apps	(Points)
-	Harris Academicals RFC		
–	Dundee HSFP		
–	Currie		
Senior career
Years	Team	Apps	(Points)
1997–1998	Caledonia Reds		
1998–2003	Glasgow Warriors	33	(10)
International career
Years	Team	Apps	(Points)
-	Scotland A		
Coaching career
- Years: Team
- 2002–2003: Glasgow Warriors Technical Analyst
- 2002–: Scottish Rugby Union Head of Perf. Analysis
- 2012–: Scottish Rugby Union National Team Manager

Gavin Scott (born 19 September 1974) is a former Scotland A international rugby union player. He played for Glasgow Warriors and Caledonia Reds at the Hooker position. In August 2021 he will take over as Director of Rugby Development at the Scottish Rugby Union.

== Rugby Union career ==
=== Amateur career ===
Scott played at amateur level for Harris Academicals RFC, Dundee HSFP and Currie RFC.

=== Professional career ===
From 1997, Scott played for Caledonia Reds. When the Reds side was disbanded in 1998 and merged with Glasgow, Scott then played for Glasgow Warriors.

His first competitive match for Glasgow was in the 1998–99's WRU Challenge Cup. He started against Bridgend Ravens in a postponed match eventually played on 27 January 1999. Scott played 33 competitive matches for the Glasgow club in total. His last match was the pre-season friendly against Exeter Chiefs in 2002-03 as a temporary replacement for Gordon Bulloch.

=== International career ===
He was capped at Scotland A. Scott was also called up to the senior Scotland squad on numerous occasions but was ultimately never capped at that level.

=== Coaching career ===
He remained in the Glasgow squad till the end of the 2003 season, although in that last 2002–03 season he was the Warriors' technical analyst and team manager.

He also became involved in the Scottish Rugby Union at this time becoming their Head of Performance Analysis. In 2012, he was also appointed the National Team Manager at the SRU.

On 8 April 2021 it was announced that Scott would take over the Director of Rugby Development at the Scottish Rugby Union in August of that year.
