= Murray Craig =

Scottish rugby union player

- Born: Murray Pringle Craig; 14 April 1971 (age 55) Scotland
- Occupation: Rugby player

Rugby union career
- Position: Centre
Amateur team(s)
| Years | Team | Apps | (Points) |
- Edinburgh Wanderers
| – | Waterloo | | |
| – | Currie | | |
Senior career
| Years | Team | Apps | (Points) |
| 1995-96 | Leicester Tigers | 10 | (10) |
| 1996-97 | Nottingham Rugby | | |
| 1997-98 | Edinburgh Rugby | | |
| 1998 | Glasgow Warriors | 0 | (0) |
| 1998-2000 | Exeter Chiefs | | |
Provincial / State sides
| Years | Team | Apps | (Points) |
- Exiles
International career
| Years | Team | Apps | (Points) |
- Scotland U21
| – | Scotland 'A' | | |

Murray Craig is a Scottish former rugby union player. He played professionally for Glasgow Warriors and at amateur level for Currie normally playing at the Centre position.

Craig learnt his rugby at Haddington then played for Edinburgh Wanderers. He also played for amateur club Currie

He was capped for Scotland at Under 21 and Scotland 'A' level. He was also in the Scottish Thistles squad which toured New Zealand in 1997.

He represented the Exiles District side, winning the Scottish Inter-District Championship in 1994-95 season.

He was capped for the Exile side while playing his rugby for Waterloo. He left Waterloo in 1995. joining Leicester Tigers for a season until 1996. He subsequently joined Nottingham Rugby in season 1996-97.

Craig then returned to Scotland joining Edinburgh Rugby for the 1997-98 season before switching to Glasgow Warriors ahead of the 1998-99 season. He played in Glasgow's pre-season match against Richmond, coming off the bench for his non-competitive debut. However he later failed a medical with Glasgow and was released.

In October 1998, Craig made the decision to move to Exeter Chiefs. Craig's two-year package - believed to be worth a total of £100,000, included a house, car and a part-time PE teaching post at a local sports college.

In fact Craig stayed for only one year, returning to Scotland once more in the Summer of 1999 at took a teaching job at George Watson's College remaining there until 2005 at which time he moved into further education lecturing in Sports Coaching and Sports Development becoming a coach at Telford College in Edinburgh in 2005 He remained there till 2011 and is now a Teaching Fellow at Edinburgh University

In 2002, he was playing for Boroughmuir.
