= Gordon Macpherson =

NZ rugby union player (born 1962)

- Born: 9 October 1962 (age 64) Gisborne, New Zealand
- Height: 1.95 m (6 ft 5 in)
- Weight: 102 kg (225 lb)
- School: Gisborne Boys' High School

Rugby union career
- Position: Lock
Amateur team(s)
Years	Team	Apps	(Points)
1993–1997	West of Scotland		
Provincial / State sides
Years	Team	Apps	(Points)
1983–1984	Poverty Bay	14	
1985–1993	Otago	137	
International career
Years	Team	Apps	(Points)
1986	New Zealand	1	(0)
Coaching career
- Years: Team
- 1993–1997: West of Scotland (player-coach)
- 1996–2003: Glasgow Warriors (Forwards coach)
- 2003–2004: West of Scotland
- 2004–2005: Sarasota Exiles
- 2005–2009: USA Hawks (Asst.)
- 2011–2014: Glasgow Hutchesons Aloysians RFC
- 2015–: Atlanta Renegades

Gordon Macpherson (born 9 October 1962) is a former New Zealand rugby union player. A lock, Macpherson represented Poverty Bay and Otago at a provincial level. He played a single match for the New Zealand national side, the All Blacks, a test against France in 1986.

He moved from Otago in 1993 to Scotland where he was player-coach for West of Scotland. West of Scotland is an amateur rugby club based in Milngavie, near Glasgow. He was to marry a Scot and settle in Scotland.

He became a forwards coach in Scotland. He became involved in coaching the Scotland 'A' side and also became forwards coach of the Glasgow Warriors, then Glasgow Rugby under Kevin Greene in 1996 (part-time), then full-time professionally under Keith Robertson in November 1997. He stayed an assistant coach under subsequent Glasgow Head Coaches Richie Dixon and Kiwi Searancke.

Macpherson left Glasgow Warriors after Kiwi Searancke was sacked in April 2003. It was felt that the abrasive style that Searancke developed at the professional provincial club caused a rift between players and management.

On leaving the Glasgow club he was appointed as the West of Scotland Head coach in June 2003.

Macpherson then moved to the USA coaching an exile team in Sarasota, Florida in 2004. He was to become the assistant coach to the USA Hawks. The North America 4 rugby union league was replaced in 2009 by the Americas Rugby Championship and the USA Hawks folded.

Macpherson received his All Blacks cap at a ceremony in Gisborne, New Zealand in 2009.

He returned to Scotland and became the new head coach for Glasgow Hutchesons Aloysians RFC, another amateur club, for the 2011-12 season. He stepped down from this role in 2014 when GHA announced a younger coaching team headed by former Glasgow Warriors player Peter Jericevich who, at 24, will take on the role as player-coach.

On 7 August 2015 it was announced that Macpherson would be the head coach of Atlanta Renegades in the USA.
