= Matt McGrandles =

Scottish rugby union player (born 1973)

- Born: Matthew McGrandles; 7 October 1973 (age 53) Stirling, Scotland
- Height: 5 ft 10 in (1.78 m)
- Weight: 87 kg (13 st 10 lb)
- Notable relative(s): Alison McGrandles, sister
- Occupation: Rugby player

Rugby union career
- Position: Centre
Amateur team(s)
Years	Team	Apps	(Points)
1979-1997	Stirling County		
1997-1999	Glasgow Hawks		
1999-2001	Stirling County		
2005-2008	Strathendrick		
Senior career
Years	Team	Apps	(Points)
1997–2001	Glasgow	10	(10)
Provincial / State sides
Years	Team	Apps	(Points)
1995-1997	Glasgow District	15	
International career
Years	Team	Apps	(Points)
1995	Scotland U21	4	
Coaching career
- Years: Team
- 2005-2008: Strathendrick RFC (Head Coach)
- 2010-2011: Stirling County(18s Backs Coach)
- 2013-2014: Stirling County(18s Backs Coach)
- 2014-2018: Stirling County (18s Head Coach)

Matt McGrandles (born 7 October 1973 in Stirling, Scotland) is a Scottish former rugby union player. He played professionally for Glasgow Warriors and at amateur level for Stirling County and Glasgow Hawks normally playing at the Centre position.

As a teenager McGrandles played for Stirling County

He was part of the Scotland Development XV side that played New South Wales in 1996.

Rugby turned professional in Scotland in 1996 and McGrandles was signed by Glasgow Rugby, now Glasgow Warriors, in 1997 from his new club Glasgow Hawks. He played for the Warriors for several seasons including Heineken Cup matches

He played 10 competitive matches for Glasgow Warriors in two seasons: 1997–98 and 1998–99. Not involved in the Glasgow squad for the 1999–00 season but captain at Stirling County 1999–2001, he made a return to the Glasgow squad in 2000–01 being taken on the Canadian pre-season tour. He played in the Coastal Cup match against the US Pacific Coast Grizzlies, but this friendly pre-season match was his last game playing with Glasgow as he was forced to withdraw from injury, having been selected on the bench for the last Canadian tour match against British Columbia.

When not playing for Glasgow Warriors, McGrandles played for Glasgow Hawks.

== Coach ==
From 2005 to 2008 he was head coach and player for Strathendrick.

From 2014 to 2018 he was the head coach of Stirling County Under 18s. Since taking over as head coach in 2014, under his guidance the under-18 side achieved: - Caledonia District Youth Cup winners in season 2014/15, - National Youth Presidents Conference League winners 2015/2016 - National Youth Cup winners 2015/16 - Caledonia District Youth Cup winners 2015/16 - National Youth Presidents Conference League winners 2016/17 - National Youth Cup winners 2016/17 - Caledonia Youth T4 Conference joint League winners 2016/17 - National Youth Cup winners 2017/18 - National Youth Shogun Conference League winners 2017/18 - Caledonia Youth T4 Conference League winners 2017/18 - Caledonia Youth Plate Winners 2017/18

He was awarded the Scottish Rugby Youth Coach of the Season in 2017 for developing 2 U18s teams at Stirling County, focusing on squad development and retention of players moving into senior rugby at the club.

He founded FVSE CIC which helps young people learn business start up skills and increase their employability. and is an Event Director for the Stirling Highland Games
