= Nick Greenstock =

English rugby union player (born 1973)

Nicholas Greenstock (born 3 November 1973) is a former rugby union footballer, who won four caps for England during 1997 at centre.

He played club rugby for Wasps, Harlequins, London Irish and Staines.

Educated at Port Regis School prep school and later Sherborne School, he is the son of Sir Jeremy Greenstock, a former high-ranking British diplomat and the former United Kingdom Ambassador to the United Nations.

Nick retired from full-time professional rugby in 2002, but played part-time with Harlequins and then London Irish 2002-2004 whilst working for the Royal Bank of Scotland.

Nick left the Royal Bank of Scotland in 2010, and is managing director and a founder partner of Gatehouse Advisory Partners, a geopolitical consultancy established with his father Sir Jeremy Greenstock and Sir David Manning.

Nick is married and has two children.
