= Andrew Ness =

Scottish rugby union player

- Born: Andrew G. Ness; 1 October 1971 (age 55) Scotland
- Height: 6 ft 3 in (1.91 m)
- Weight: 102 kg (16 st 1 lb)
- School: Dollar Academy
- University: University of Strathclyde

Rugby union career
- Position: Flanker
Amateur team(s)
Years	Team	Apps	(Points)
1989–97	Glasgow High Kelvinside		
1997–99	Glasgow Hawks		
Senior career
Years	Team	Apps	(Points)
1997–98	Glasgow Warriors		
International career
Years	Team	Apps	(Points)
1989	Scotland Schools		

Andrew Ness (born 1 October 1971) is a Scottish former rugby union player who played for Glasgow Warriors at the Flanker position.

In 1989 he played for Scotland Schools and was highlighted as having huge potential for senior rugby. At the time he was still in Dollar Academy.

He enlisted with Glasgow High Kelvinside that same year.

While at Strathclyde University studying for an MSc in Business Economics, Ness represented Scotland Students at the Rugby Students World Cup in 1992.

Glasgow High Kelvinside merged with Glasgow Academicals to form Glasgow Hawks in 1997. (Both original clubs still survive as spin-offs from the merger). From 1997 Ness then played for amateur club Glasgow Hawks.

The flanker was named in the professional provincial Glasgow squad for the season 1997–98

Ness played for Glasgow in their pre-season match against London Scottish on 10 August 1997. Although Glasgow lost the match 15 – 49, Ness scored a try.

Ness is now a Fund Manager for Global Emerging Markets. He is an associate of the UK Society of Investment Professionals (ASIP).
