= Luke Smith (rugby union) =

South African rugby union player (1971–2021)

- Born: Luke Atholl Smith; 9 February 1971 East London, Eastern Cape, South Africa
- Died: 16 July 2021 (aged 50) East London, Eastern Cape, South Africa
- Height: 175 cm (5 ft 9 in)
- Weight: 84 kg (13 st 3 lb; 185 lb)
- School: Dale College Boys' High School

Rugby union career
- Position: Fly-half
Senior career
| Years | Team | Apps | (Points) |
| 1998–99 | Glasgow Warriors | 5 | (27) |
| 1999–2000 | Racing 92 | | |
| 2000 | Rotherham | 5 | (61) |
| 2001–02 | Saracens | 17 | (194) |
Provincial / State sides
| Years | Team | Apps | (Points) |
- Eastern Province
- Blue Bulls
- Sharks (Currie Cup)
| 1998 | Border Bulldogs | | |
Coaching career
- Years: Team
- 2013–present: Dale College Boys' High School

Luke Smith (9 February 1971 in East London, Eastern Cape, South Africa – 16 July 2021) was a professional rugby union player. He played at fly-half for Glasgow Caledonians, now Glasgow Warriors; as well as Racing 92 and Saracens among others.

He signed for Glasgow in 1998 from Border Bulldogs in South Africa. He was Scottish-qualified as his grandmother, Rachel Watson, was from Edinburgh.

He made the move in the hope of representing Scotland. He stated: "After being sidelined for two years because of a serious knee injury, I made up my mind to continue my career in Europe. When I told my agent about my family background, he set about getting me fixed up with a Scottish team. The ultimate goal for any player is to play at international level and as soon as I found out that I could be eligible for Scotland, my sights were set."

However, injury prevented him from receiving Scotland 'A' or Scotland 'B' honours and the hope of a Scotland career stalled. He did however represent a combined Scottish Districts side.

He played two matches in the Heineken Cup for Glasgow; against US Colomiers and Pontypridd. He also played in the Scottish Inter-District Championship and in that season's WRU Challenge Cup.

He also played for Glasgow in friendlies against touring international sides South Africa and the Māori All Blacks and Fiji.

After playing for Glasgow, Smith moved to Racing 92 and then Rotherham. He played just 5 matches for Rotherham before signing for Saracens.

Smith also played for Mirano Rugby in Italy; and Birmingham & Solihull, Coventry and Esher in England.

Schooled at Selborne College in East London and Dale College Boys' High School in King William's Town, South Africa, Smith returned to his former school as rugby coach.

Smith died suddenly on 16 July 2021.
