= Rory Couper =

Scottish rugby union player

- Born: Rory Couper; 6 June 1980 (age 46) Irvine, Scotland
- Height: 1.83 m (6 ft 0 in)
- Weight: 86 kg (13 st 8 lb)

Rugby union career
- Position: Wing
Amateur team(s)
Years	Team	Apps	(Points)
- Ardrossan Academicals
–	Boroughmuir		
Senior career
Years	Team	Apps	(Points)
1998-2004	Glasgow Warriors	0	(0)
2004	Edinburgh	1	(0)
International career
Years	Team	Apps	(Points)
- Scotland U18
- Scotland U19
2006-08	Scotland Club XV		
National sevens team
Years	Team		Comps
- Scotland 7s

Rory Couper (born 6 June 1980 in Irvine, Scotland) is a former Scotland 7s international rugby union player. He played as a Wing.

== Rugby Union career ==
=== Amateur career ===
He played at amateur level for Ardrossan Academicals RFC.

In 2000, Couper was playing for Boroughmuir RFC.

=== Professional career ===
==== Glasgow Warriors ====
His talent was noticed by the Glasgow District Rugby Union. The GDRU had organised a Glasgow Warriors 'academy project' team, the Glasgow Thistles, which would receive their training in New Zealand in the summer of 1998. Couper received a place in the Glasgow Thistles 22-man squad.

The next season 1998–99 Couper, and his Glasgow Thistle team-mate Rory Kerr, trained with the Glasgow squad, but they did not play. Instead, they were still playing for their amateur clubs.

Both Kerr and Couper broke into the Glasgow Warriors squad the following season 1999 - 2000. Kerr broke into the first team that season, but Couper found himself on the bench. He was a substitute in Glasgow's last match in the Welsh-Scottish League that season, an away tie with Neath RFC. Glasgow were beaten 47 - 10 and Coupar did not play. The squad placing and named as an unused substitute was as close as Couper came to playing a competitive match for Glasgow Warriors.

He did play in a friendly match for Glasgow Warriors. In 2004 he was part of the Glasgow side that played the Scotland U21 side.

This was a preparation match for the national Under-21 side in order to get them ready for the Under 21 Rugby World Cup. Playing against the Warriors proved a step too far for the Under 21s and they were beaten 43 - 0. Couper helped himself to a brace of tries.

==== Edinburgh ====
Shortly after his Glasgow appearance, Couper was picked up by Edinburgh Rugby and played in a Celtic League match against Llanelli Scarlets on 6 March 2004.

=== International career ===
Couper captained the Scotland Under-19 team.

Internationally, Couper made the Scotland Sevens team.
