= Gavin Fraser =

English rugby union player

- Born: Gavin Fraser; 23 February 1972 (age 54) Liverpool, Merseyside, England
- Height: 5 ft 3 in (1.60 m)
- Weight: 85 kg (13 st 5 lb)
- School: Merchant Taylors' Boys' School, Crosby
- University: University of Lincoln

Rugby union career
- Position: Wing
Amateur team(s)
Years	Team	Apps	(Points)
1990-91	Hull Ionians		
1991-95	Waterloo		
1995-96	London Scottish		
1996-97	London Irish		
1997-1998	Kilmarnock RFC		
1998-2000	Watsonians RFC		
Senior career
Years	Team	Apps	(Points)
1997-98	Glasgow Warriors	4	(0)
Provincial / State sides
Years	Team	Apps	(Points)
1992-96	Scottish Exiles		
International career
Years	Team	Apps	(Points)
- Scotland U21

Gavin Fraser (born 23 February 1972 in Liverpool, England) is an English-born, former Scotland Under 21 international, Scottish rugby union player who played for Glasgow Warriors at the Wing positions.

== Biography ==
Gavin Fraser was Scottish-Qualified as his father, Gordon, was born in Scotland. Gordon Fraser moved to England in the 1960s settling in Corby, Northamptonshire, a town dubbed 'Little Scotland' due to the number of Scots that settled there. Gavin went to Merchant Taylors' Boys' School, Crosby and then, later, the University of Lincoln.

In 1990-91 season he played for Hull Ionians, but quickly moved to another amateur club Waterloo.

Fraser was selected to play for the Scottish Exiles Under 21 amateur district team in 1992 in the Under 21 Scottish Inter-District Championship. He later played for the full Scottish Exiles side, and won the Exiles first Championship in 1995.

He represented Scotland at Under 21 grade but never reached a full Senior cap though later made a Scotland Development XV side.

Moving from Waterloo, Fraser naturally signed for London Scottish. This move only was to last for one season before he moved on to another 'Exile' club.

He played for London Irish for one season: 1996-97 but moved from there to join Glasgow Warriors.

Fraser began his Glasgow career by playing in the pre-season friendly match against the Australian Super Rugby side Brumbies. Glasgow lost the match 6 - 22 and were unable to prevent the Australians' clean sweep against Scotland's district sides.

He played for Glasgow in the 1997-98 Heineken Cup. He came off the bench in Glasgow's away match to Swansea RFC. Similarly he came off the bench in Glasgow's away match to Leicester Tigers.

He also played for Glasgow in the 1997–98 Scottish Inter-District Championship; against Edinburgh Rugby on 19 October 1997, coming on for Craig Sangster at Full Back; and against Border Reivers on 24 October 1997, coming on for James Craig.

Whilst at the professional Glasgow club, Fraser was also able to play for an amateur club in Glasgow's district when not on Warriors duty. Fraser was assigned to Kilmarnock RFC. At the end of the season he was diagnosed with a prolapsed disc and his Glasgow contract had expired. Due to the SRU's cost exercise of the merger of Scotland's 4 district clubs into 2, 43 professional players including 6 Scotland internationalists lost their club - Fraser's contract was not renewed. However he was free to move outwith Glasgow's district and after treatment signed with another amateur club Watsonians. He played for the Edinburgh club from 1998-2000.

Gavin stayed in Glasgow till 2005 when he moved back to Northamptonshire. He played rugby in friendly matches and represented 'Scottish Legend' sides.

In 2008, Fraser played for the Nottingham Panthers Legends team.

In 2020 Gav is due to represent team G&T in the annual merseytri team swim run where along with his dashing team mate he is considered a favourite.
