= Chris Docherty =

Scottish rugby union player (born 1976)

- Born: Chris Docherty; 14 January 1976 (age 50) Scotland
- Height: 5 ft 7 in (1.70 m)
- Weight: 87 kg (13 st 10 lb)

Rugby union career
- Position: Hooker
Amateur team(s)
Years	Team	Apps	(Points)
- Glasgow High Kelvinside
–	Glasgow Hawks		
Senior career
Years	Team	Apps	(Points)
1997-2002	Glasgow Warriors	2	(0)

Chris Docherty (born 14 January 1976 in Scotland) is a Scottish former rugby union player who played for Glasgow Warriors as a Hooker position.

He played once in the Heineken Cup for Glasgow, during the 1997-98 against Leicester Tigers, coming off the bench. Glasgow lost the match 90 - 19 in the Quarter Final play-off.

He was announced in Glasgow's Heineken Cup squad of 2001 - 02.

The Hooker started out his amateur career with Glasgow High Kelvinside. On GHK merge with Glasgow Academicals in 1997 to form the Glasgow Hawks; he played for the new club.

Docherty played for the amateur club side Glasgow Hawks and captained them in season 2001 - 02.

He moved into coaching for one season at Hawks, before moving to coach Cartha Queens Park RFC.
