= Gerry Hawkes =

Scottish rugby union player

- Born: Gerry Hawkes Scotland

Rugby union career
- Position: Wing
Amateur team(s)
| Years | Team | Apps | (Points) |
| – | West of Scotland | | |
| 1989-1997 | Glasgow High Kelvinside | | |
| – | Glasgow Hawks | | |
| – | Hamilton RFC | | |
| – | Glasgow District | | |
Senior career
| Years | Team | Apps | (Points) |
| 1997-98 | Glasgow Warriors | | |
Coaching career
- Years: Team
- Glasgow High Kelvinside

Gerry "The Hitman" Hawkes (born in Scotland), is a Scottish former rugby union player for Glasgow Warriors at the Wing position.

His career spanned the amateur and professional era in rugby.

In 1989 he was playing for West of Scotland but in the same year he moved to Glasgow High Kelvinside.

He was playing for Glasgow High Kelvinside from 1989 to 1997.

Prior to their professionalism in 1996, Hawkes represented the Glasgow District.

When Glasgow High Kelvinside merged with Glasgow Academicals to form Glasgow Hawks in 1997, the Wing played for the newly merged side. (The merger to form the Glasgow Hawks was incomplete and both Glasgow Academicals and Glasgow High Kelvinside survived as smaller spin-off clubs.)

He was in the provincial professional Glasgow squad for the 1997-98 season. He played in the friendly against the Australian provincial side Brumbies on 6 December 1997 when he came on temporarily for the injured Gavin Fraser.

In 2003, Hawkes was playing for Hamilton RFC.

In 2010, it was announced that Hawkes would be returning to Glasgow High Kelvinside to be a Back Three Coach.

In 2013, Hawkes was playing for Hamilton RFC.
