= Iain Sinclair (rugby union) =

Scottish rugby union player

- Born: Iain Sinclair; 7 October 1976 (age 50) Scotland
- Height: 5 ft 11 in (1.80 m)
- Weight: 83 kg (13 st 1 lb)
- University: Edinburgh Business School

Rugby union career
- Position: Flanker
Amateur team(s)
Years	Team	Apps	(Points)
1995-2006	Watsonians		
Senior career
Years	Team	Apps	(Points)
1997-1998	Glasgow Warriors	7	(0)
1998-2001	Edinburgh Rugby		
International career
Years	Team	Apps	(Points)
- Scotland A

Iain Sinclair (born 7 October 1976 in Scotland) is a Scottish former Scotland A international rugby union player who played for Glasgow Warriors at the Flanker position. A product of Scottish Schools U16 and U18, Sinclair went on to captain both Glasgow and Scotland at U18, U19 and U21 age group levels.

He played 6 matches for Glasgow in the Heineken Cup in 1997-98 season. Sinclair also played in the Scottish Inter-District Championship of the 1997-98 season for Glasgow against Edinburgh Rugby. Glasgow won the match 36-20.

In 1997, Sinclair captained the Scottish Silver Thistles, an undefeated Scotland Development XV which toured New Zealand.

For the 1998-99 season onwards, Sinclair played for Edinburgh Rugby winning player of the inter-district Tri Series in 1999. He played a further 10 times in the Heineken Cup for Edinburgh between 1998 and 2001.

He played for Watsonians. and Penguin International RFC.

He was a player for the Xodus Steelers, a veteran Scottish Sevens side that contested the Dubai International Veterans Rugby 10's, winning in 2012 and then managing the side in 2013 to back to back victory.

A former Managing Director at Murray Metals, Sinclair is now Executive Director, Global Energy Group.

== World-first swim ==
On September 22, 2025 Sinclair became the first person to swim from the Atlantic to the North Sea along the 60-mile Caledonian Canal. Canal locks were opened so that he could swim uninterrupted. He was aiming to raise £60,000 to help three charities, Crohn’s & Colitis UK, British Heart Foundation, and Mikeysline.
