= Danny Ablett =

Scottish rugby union player

Daniel Ablett
- Born: Daniel Ablett; 5 April 1976 (age 50) Scotland
- Height: 1.78 m (5 ft 10 in)
- Weight: 89 kg (14 st 0 lb)

Rugby union career
- Position: Centre
Amateur team(s)
Years	Team	Apps	(Points)
- Boroughmuir
–	Glasgow Academicals		
–	Glasgow Hawks		
Senior career
Years	Team	Apps	(Points)
1997-98	Glasgow Warriors	2	(0)
International career
Years	Team	Apps	(Points)
- Scotland Schools
–	Scotland U21		

Daniel Ablett is a former Scotland Under 21 international rugby union player. A centre, he played professionally for Glasgow Warriors. He is now a surgeon.

== Rugby Union career ==
=== Amateur career ===
Ablett went to Boroughmuir High School and then played rugby for Boroughmuir. Switching to play in Glasgow, he then played for Glasgow Academicals.

On the Academicals merger with Glasgow High Kelvinside he then turned out for the newly formed team Glasgow Hawks.

=== Professional career ===
Ablett first played for Glasgow Warriors in the pre-season matches against Sale Sharks on 16 August 1997 and against Caledonia Reds on 28 August 1997, coming on as a replacement for Alan Bulloch in the 65th minute.

He played for Glasgow Warriors in the European Rugby Cup (then known as the Heineken Cup). He made his competitive debut for the club as a replacement in the match against Swansea on 21 September 1997 - a 35–21 win for the provincial Glasgow side. He thus earned the Glasgow Warrior No. 39.

He made his next appearance, again in the Heineken Cup, playing in the away match against English side Wasps in a 43–5 defeat for the Glasgow side.

=== International career ===
Ablett played for Scotland Schools and then Scotland Under 21 sides.

== Royal Navy career ==
Ablett served in the Royal Navy. He served in Afghanistan as a Lieutenant Surgeon and was awarded the Operational Service Medal by the Duchess of Cornwall.

== Medical career ==
He is now a consultant surgeon at the University Hospitals in the north midlands of England.
