= Derrick Patterson =

Scotland international rugby union player

- Born: Derrick William Patterson; 6 July 1968 (age 58) Hawick, Scotland
- Height: 5 ft 9 in (1.75 m)
- Weight: 88 kg (13 st 12 lb)

Rugby union career
- Position: Scrum-half
Amateur team(s)
Years	Team	Apps	(Points)
- Hawick
–	Edinburgh Academicals		
–	Heriots		
Senior career
Years	Team	Apps	(Points)
1995-96	West Hartlepool		
1996-98	Edinburgh		
1997-98	→Caledonia Reds		
1998-99	Glasgow Warriors	5	(5)
1999-2000	Stade Français		
2000	Petrarca Rugby		
Provincial / State sides
Years	Team	Apps	(Points)
1992-95	Edinburgh District		
International career
Years	Team	Apps	(Points)
1992	Scotland 'B'	1	(0)
1994-95	Scotland	2	(0)

Derrick Patterson (born 6 July 1968 in Hawick, Scotland) is a former Scotland international rugby union Scrum-half who played for Glasgow Warriors, Caledonia Reds and Edinburgh.

== Rugby Union career ==
=== Amateur career ===
At amateur level in Scotland, Patterson played for Hawick and Edinburgh Academicals.

Signed by amateur club Heriots - the first Scottish rugby union side to pay transfer money - who would use the player when not needed by their provincial professional district Edinburgh Rugby he moved back to Scotland to play not long after the start of the 1996-97 season.

In 2010 he was part of the Xodus Steelers, the Scottish veteran Sevens squad to play in the Dubai Sevens.

=== Provincial and professional career ===
He played for provincial Edinburgh District in the amateur era.

After the 1995 World Cup, rugby opened the game to professionalism. In Scotland this happened a year later in 1996. Patterson played for West Hartlepool in England to 1996.

He moved to provincial professional district Edinburgh Rugby not long after the start of the 1996-97 season as part of a deal with Heriots.

However he was loaned out to Caledonia Reds almost immediately and played for the Reds in the Heineken Cup. "Derrick fitted in comfortably with our squad. He played very well and settled in both on and off the pitch," said Nick Oswald, the Caledonia chief executive, who added: "We are now very relieved and pleased that he is available to play for us."

When Caledonia Reds was disbanded in 1998, Patterson moved to play for Glasgow Warriors under its newly merged name Glasgow Caledonians. He played in the European Conference for Glasgow; and in the Welsh Rugby Union's Challenge Cup (in which both Glasgow and Edinburgh were invited, a forerunner to the Welsh-Scottish League) in the 1998 - 99 season. However he was let go by the Glasgow club after only this one season.

Signing for Stade Français in the 1999 - 2000 season, he stated his ambition to play against Glasgow in European competition: "I would love to be up against the Reds (Glasgow Warriors) in Europe because it would give me the chance to prove a lot of people were off the mark on how they rated me. I believe I'm still good enough to perform at the highest level."

Moving again after one season, for 2000 - 01 season, he hoped for a return to Scotland but instead he was signed by Italian side Petrarca Rugby.

Patterson was also to play for Sharks.

=== International career ===
He was capped by Scotland 'B' against France 'B' on 2 February 1992.

He represented Scotland twice; the first cap against South Africa at Murrayfield, the second cap against Tonga in Pretoria, South Africa at the 1995 World Cup. He was a substitute but not used in the World Cup matches against Ivory Coast, France and New Zealand.

=== Coaching career ===
He was brought in by Alan Solomons to help coach Edinburgh Rugby in 2014.
