= Alan Kittle =

- Born: Alan John Kittle; 10 December 1970 (age 55) Scotland
- Height: 6 ft 1 in (1.85 m)
- Weight: 105 kg (16 st 7 lb)
- School: Ross High School, Tranent

Rugby union career
- Position: tighthead Prop
Amateur team(s)
| Years | Team | Apps | (Points) |
- Stewarts Melville
| – | Watsonians | | |
| – | Stirling County | | |
| – | Musselburgh | | |
Senior career
| Years | Team | Apps | (Points) |
| 1996-97 | Edinburgh Rugby | | |
| 1997-99 | Glasgow Warriors | | |
International career
| Years | Team | Apps | (Points) |
- Scotland U19

Alan Kittle (born 10 December 1970 in Scotland) is a Scottish former rugby union player for Glasgow Warriors. He played at the Loosehead Prop position.

== Rugby Union career ==
Kittle played rugby both in the amateur and professional era.

=== Amateur career ===
He played with amateur club Stewarts Melville in 1993 to 1995.

He joined Watsonians in the 1995–96 season.

In 1999 and 2000, Alan played for Musselburgh RFC.

=== Professional career ===
When rugby's professional era began in Scotland in 1996, Kittle signed for Edinburgh. As part of the Edinburgh deal Kittle could still play for Watsonians.

However he was overlooked by the Edinburgh team and joined Glasgow for 1997 to 1998 season. As part of the Glasgow rugby deal Kittle could play for Stirling County.

He played 9 matches for Glasgow in the Heineken Cup and played in the Scottish Inter-District Championship. He also played for Glasgow against South Africa. and Fiji and Māori All Blacks

=== International career ===
He played for Scotland Schools while still at Ross High School, Tranent. He also played for Scotland Under 19s in 1990.

He was in Scotland's World Cup preparation squad till injury in 1994.

He played for a Scotland Development XV in the Zimbabwe tour of 1995. He was on the bench for the combined Scottish Districts match against Spain in 2000.

== Outside of rugby ==
Kittle now has an Art and Marketing career and is a Creative Director in Bristol.
