= John Shaw (rugby union) =

Scottish rugby union player, coach, & referee (born 1968)

- Born: John Shaw; 6 July 1968 (age 58) Scotland
- Height: 6 ft 0 in (1.83 m)
- Weight: 90 kg (14 st 2 lb; 198 lb)
- School: Airdrie Academy

Rugby union career
- Position: Flanker
Amateur team(s)
Years	Team	Apps	(Points)
-	West of Scotland		
–	Currie RFC		
–	East Kilbride RFC		
Senior career
Years	Team	Apps	(Points)
1996-2000	Glasgow Warriors	22	(10)
International career
Years	Team	Apps	(Points)
-	Scotland A		
Coaching career
- Years: Team
- -: East Kilbride RFC (Player-coach)
- –: Waysiders Drumpellier
- –: Whitecraigs RFC
Refereeing career
Years	Competition		Apps
2013-14	RBS West - Div. 1		

John Shaw (born 6 July 1968 in Scotland) is a Scottish former rugby union player and coach and now referee who played for Glasgow Warriors at the Flanker position.

== Rugby Union career ==
=== Amateur career ===
Shaw played for West of Scotland

Shaw played for Currie RFC in 2001-2. and captained the side.

He played for East Kilbride RFC at Flanker. after his time at Currie.

In 2007 he was playing for a Scottish Classics XV side. Afterwards he felt unwell and a heart attack was diagnosed.

=== Professional career ===
As the Flanker named for Warriors first match as a professional team - against Newbridge in the European Challenge Cup - Shaw has the distinction of being given Glasgow Warrior No. 7 for the provincial side.

On moving to Currie, Shaw still played for Glasgow much to the dismay of Edinburgh Rugby who had prematurely included him in their squad to face Glasgow.

He played for Glasgow in their match against South Africa in 1998. he also played for the amateur Glasgow District against Scotland Under-21 in 2001.

=== International career ===
He was capped for Scotland A.

=== Coaching career ===
He became a player-coach for the East Kilbride side under Fraser Stott in 2003.

Shaw was to coach Waysiders Drumpellier from 2006 to 2010

Shaw was to coach Whitecraigs RFC from 2010

=== Refereeing career ===
He is now refereeing rugby matches.

== Outside of rugby ==
Away from rugby, he is the managing director of Scaffolding Scotland.

Shaw was arrested and charged with assault and disorderly conduct in Scottsdale, AZ on 3 December 2016.
