= Mike Beckham =

Cook Islands international rugby union player (born 1970)

- Born: Michael John Scott Beckham; 22 May 1970 (age 56) Auckland, New Zealand
- Height: 6 ft 1 in (1.85 m)
- Weight: 113 kg (17 st 11 lb)

Rugby union career
- Position: Loosehead Prop
Amateur team(s)
Years	Team	Apps	(Points)
- New Zealand Army
1997-98	Glasgow Hawks		
Senior career
Years	Team	Apps	(Points)
1997- 98	Glasgow Warriors	5	(0)
1998-99	Leeds Tykes	23	(0)
International career
Years	Team	Apps	(Points)
- Cook Islands

Mike Beckham (born 22 May 1970, in Auckland, New Zealand) is a Cook Islands former international rugby union player for Glasgow Warriors at the Loosehead Prop position.

== Career ==
Beckham was signed by Kevin Greene, the Glasgow coach, in 1997. Previously the time Beckham had a 9 to 5 job and was playing rugby for the New Zealand Army team. He was capped internationally by the Cook Islands.

Beckham said of the move: "I came here to get a taste of European rugby. The opportunity came through Kevin Greene. I enjoyed the game against West Hartlepool at the weekend, despite a calf strain, and it was good to learn about the style of play. At home we have more short phases, we attack from anywhere and we bring it back to the pack when there is no way through."

As well as pre-season friendlies against West Hartlepool, Caledonia Reds and Brumbies, Beckham played 4 times in the Heineken Cup for Glasgow in the 1997–98 season. He also played in the Scottish Inter-District Championship of that year against Caledonia Reds.

When not playing for the provincial Warriors side, Beckham played for the amateur side Glasgow Hawks. He scored a try for the Hawks side that beat Toulouse 37–15 on 20 February 1998. Beckham was also part of the Hawks side that won the Scottish Cup and the then Scottish Division 2.

Beckham signed with the Leeds Tykes in 1998, the following season.

Beckham now works in logistics & operations and project management in New Zealand.
