= Jamie Weston =

Scottish rugby union player (born 1976)

- Born: Jamie Weston; 8 January 1976 (age 50) Scotland
- Height: 5 ft 9 in (1.75 m)
- Weight: 80 kg (12 st 8 lb; 176 lb)
- School: Kelvinside Academy
- University: Heriot Watt University; Keble College, Oxford University
- Notable relative(s): Vivian Weston, grandfather

Rugby union career
- Position: Scrum-half
Amateur team(s)
Years	Team	Apps	(Points)
- Watsonians RFC
–	Oxford University RFC		
Senior career
Years	Team	Apps	(Points)
1996-1998	Glasgow Warriors	3	(5)
–	Edinburgh Rugby		
–	Borders Reivers		
Provincial / State sides
Years	Team	Apps	(Points)
1995-96	Glasgow District	1	(0)
International career
Years	Team	Apps	(Points)
- Scotland U21

Jamie Weston (born 8 January 1976 in Scotland) is a former Scottish rugby union player who played for Glasgow Warriors at the Scrum-half position.

== Rugby Union career ==
=== Amateur career ===
He left Glasgow Warriors to play for Watsonians. He left Watsonians to go to Oxford. He was however playing for Watsonians from 1994.

He was captain of the Oxford University rugby team. Weston turned down a contract with Glasgow Caledonians to go to - and play rugby for - Oxford University. Weston played for Oxford University in the Melrose Sevens. Oxford University Sevens with Weston as captain won the Rosslyn Park Floodlit Sevens in London.

=== Provincial and professional career ===
Weston played for Glasgow District as a schoolboy. He went to Kelvinside Academy but then finished his schooling at Merchiston Castle School. He played once for the senior side against North and Midlands in 1996.

He then found himself in the professional Glasgow side when the district turned professional in 1996. He played in European competition for Glasgow in the European Conference - now European Challenge Cup - against Sale Sharks, Clermont, Newport and Agen, scoring a try against Agen. The following season he was named in Glasgow's squad but not used.

Playing in Glasgow Warriors 2nd professional competitive match, against Sale Sharks in European competition, as starting scrum half, Weston has the distinction of being Glasgow Warrior No. 19 for the provincial side.

He left Glasgow Warriors to play for Watsonians. He left Watsonians to go to Oxford. He was however playing for Watsonians from 1994.

He then was offered another professional contract by Edinburgh Rugby but lost his place on the merger of Edinburgh with the Border Reivers. However, when the Border team was revived, Weston was to play for the Border Reivers.

=== International career ===
He was capped by Scotland Under 21s.
