= Derek Stark (rugby union) =

Scotland international rugby union player

- Born: Derek Alexander Stark; 13 April 1966 (age 60) Kilmarnock, Scotland
- Height: 6 ft 2 in (1.88 m)
- Weight: 91 kg (14 st 5 lb)
- School: Kilmarnock Academy

Rugby union career
- Position: Wing
Amateur team(s)
| Years | Team | Apps | (Points) |
- Kilmarnock RFC
| – | Guildford & Godalming RFC | | |
| – | Chobham RFC | | |
| – | Boroughmuir RFC | | |
| – | Ayr RFC | | |
| – | Glasgow Hawks | | |
| – | Melrose RFC | | |
| – | Boroughmuir RFC | | |
Senior career
| Years | Team | Apps | (Points) |
| 1996-2000 | Glasgow Warriors | 29 | (45) |
Provincial / State sides
| Years | Team | Apps | (Points) |
| 1987-96 | Glasgow District | | |
International career
| Years | Team | Apps | (Points) |
| 1987 | Scotland U21 | 2 | |
- Scotland Club XV
| 1988-92 | Scotland B | 5 | |
| 1992-97 | Scotland A | 9 | |
| 1993-97 | Scotland | 9 | (15) |
National sevens team
| Years | Team | | Comps |
- Scotland 7s

Derek Stark (born 13 April 1966 in Kilmarnock) is a Scottish former international rugby union player who played for Glasgow Warriors at the Wing positions

== Rugby Union career ==
=== Amateur career ===
Stark grew up in Kilmarnock playing rugby with Kilmarnock RFC and working in his parents hotel there, The Foxbar Hotel.

As a teenager he moved south to England to study a catering course in Woking at the Tante Marie Culinary Academy. While he was there he played amateur rugby for Guildford & Godalming RFC and Chobham RFC.

After a sojourn into athletics, on seeing the top Caribbean athletes run slightly quicker, Stark moved back into rugby playing for Boroughmuir RFC.

Stark played for Ayr RFC

He went on to play for amateur side Glasgow Hawks.

Stark played for Melrose RFC He played half a game for Melrose; one of the ten club sides that he played for.

Stark again played for Boroughmuir RFC. and won the BT Cellnet Cup with them in 2001.

=== Provincial and professional career ===
He represented Glasgow District at U21 as well as 7s.

Stark was again picked for Glasgow District when back at Ayr RFC.

He was part of Glasgow District's famous 1989-90 side which went unbeaten all season, winning that year's Scottish Inter-District Championship outright.

On the amateur provincial Glasgow District's move into professionalism in 1996 as Glasgow Rugby - now Glasgow Warriors - Stark signed a professional contract with the Glasgow side. The move came at a time when Stark was considering a move to play for West Hartlepool RFC.

As the Wing named for Warriors first match as a professional team - against Newbridge in the European Challenge Cup - Stark has the distinction of being given Glasgow Warrior No. 14 for the provincial side.

=== International career ===
Stark played for Scotland U21, Scotland Club XV, Scotland B, Scotland A and Scotland as well as Scotland 7s.

He notably scored a try on his international Scotland debut in 1993.

== Athletics career ==
From rugby union, Stark tried his hand at being a sprinter, He could run 100 metres (330 ft) in 10.6 seconds.

== Business career ==
For a short period, Stark - along with international teammates Rowen Shepherd and Gregor Townsend - owned a bar in Edinburgh's Grassmarket area. The bar was aptly named The Three Quarters. Alongside track star Brian Whittle he was a co-director at PB events.
