= Fraser Stott =

Scottish rugby union player

- Born: Fraser Stott; 13 August 1969 (age 57) Cambuslang, Scotland
- Height: 5 ft 9 in (1.75 m)
- Weight: 78 kg (12 st 4 lb)

Rugby union career
- Position: Scrum-half
Amateur team(s)
Years	Team	Apps	(Points)
- Cambuslang RFC
1988–1999	West of Scotland		
2000–2011	East Kilbride RFC		
Senior career
Years	Team	Apps	(Points)
1996–2001	Glasgow Warriors	40	(25)
Provincial / State sides
Years	Team	Apps	(Points)
-	Glasgow District		
International career
Years	Team	Apps	(Points)
- Scotland A
2000	Barbarians		
Coaching career
- Years: Team
- 2002–2003: East Kilbride RFC (Asst.)
- 2003–2011: East Kilbride RFC

Fraser Stott (born 13 August 1969 in Cambuslang, Scotland) is a former Scottish rugby union player and coach who played for Glasgow Warriors at the Scrum-half position.

== Rugby Union career ==
=== Amateur career ===
Starting out as an amateur player he played for Cambuslang RFC until 1988 when he moved to West of Scotland.

Later rejecting a full-time contract with the Warriors but still playing for Glasgow, Stott then played for East Kilbride RFC in 2000. He was made club captain in season 2001–02.

=== Provincial and professional career ===
He was picked for the amateur Glasgow District team.

On professionalism in Scotland in 1996 he was then signed as a professional contract for the Glasgow Warriors team. As the scrum half named for Warriors first match as a professional team - against Newbridge in the European Challenge Cup - Stott has the distinction of being given Glasgow Warrior No. 9 for the provincial side.

He played with Glasgow till 2001 in spite of having a knee operation in 2000. He made 14 appearances in the Heineken Cup and 2 appearances in the European Rugby Challenge Cup for Glasgow.

=== International career ===
He has represented Scotland A. He was also picked to play for the Barbarians.

=== Coaching career ===
In the 2002–03 season he was made Assistant Coach for East Kilbride under Craig Redpath. The 2003–04 season he was made Head Coach though he still played. John Shaw was made Assistant Coach / Player. Stott was to remain with the club as player-coach until he retired in 2011. He was the supporter's player of the year for season 2010–11.

He now works as a rugby development officer for South Lanarkshire Leisure and Culture.
