= James Craig (rugby union, born 1977) =

Scotland international rugby union player

- Born: James Matthew Craig; 2 March 1977 (age 49) Glasgow, Scotland
- Height: 5 ft 11 in (1.80 m)
- Weight: 96 kg (15 st 2 lb)
- Notable relative(s): Jim Craig, father

Rugby union career
- Position: Wing
Amateur team(s)
Years	Team	Apps	(Points)
-	West of Scotland		
Senior career
Years	Team	Apps	(Points)
1996–2002	Glasgow Warriors	58	(105)
International career
Years	Team	Apps	(Points)
1997–2001	Scotland	4	(0)

James Matthew Craig (born 2 March 1977) is a Scottish former professional rugby union player.

He was capped four times between 1997 and 2001 for Scotland. He also played for the amateur club West of Scotland and professionally for the provincial side Glasgow Warriors.

James Craig is the son of Jim Craig, who played football for Celtic, and was capped for the Scotland national football team in 1967.
