= Chris Simmers =

Scottish rugby union & league player

- Born: Chris Simmers; 17 October 1969 (age 57) Scotland
- Height: 5 ft 8 in (1.73 m)
- Weight: 85 kg (13 st 5 lb)
- School: The Glasgow Academy
- University: Edinburgh University
- Notable relative(s): Brian Simmers, father Max Simmers, grandfather

Rugby union career
- Position: Centre
Amateur team(s)
Years	Team	Apps	(Points)
- Glasgow Academicals
–	Edinburgh Academicals		
–	Racing 92		
–	Edinburgh Academicals		
–	Glasgow Hawks		
Senior career
Years	Team	Apps	(Points)
1996-97	Edinburgh		
1997–99	Glasgow Warriors	15	(10)
International career
Years	Team	Apps	(Points)
- Scotland U16

Chris Simmers (born 17 October 1969 in Scotland) is a Scottish former rugby union player. He played professionally for Glasgow Warriors and at amateur level for Glasgow Hawks normally playing at the Centre position.

As a schoolboy he played for Glasgow Academicals and represented Scotland Schools. His father Brian Simmers and grandfather Max Simmers both played for Glasgow Academicals and both represented Scotland. His father Brian was a chairman of Glasgow Academicals and founded the Glasgow Hawks side on Accies and Glasgow High Kelvinside merger in 1997.

He played for Edinburgh Academicals and from there in 1991 went to Racing 92 in Paris. He played in France for one season, returning to Scotland to play for Scotland Students in the World Cup.

Professionalism came into the Scottish Rugby Union game in 1996, a year after World Rugby had decreed an open game. This meant for the first time, players could change code without sanction. Simmers played for the Scotland Rugby League Nines side in the Super League World Nines in the 1996 tournament, the abbreviated version of Rugby League.

He played for Edinburgh in 1996. He made 3 appearances in the Heineken Cup for Edinburgh in the 1996-97 season.

Playing with Glasgow Hawks he signed a professional contract with Glasgow Rugby, now Glasgow Warriors, in 1997. He played a further 10 matches in the Heineken Cup for Glasgow Warriors in the following two seasons. He also played in the Scottish Inter-District Championship in the 1997-98 season.

He survived the cull of Scottish professional players in 1998, remaining with Glasgow Warriors and Glasgow Hawks, when Caledonia Reds and Border Reivers were disbanded.

He was playing for Glasgow Hawks in 2000.

He now works for investment group Standard Life.
