= Keith Robertson (rugby union coach) =

NZ rugby union coach

- Born: Keith Robertson New Zealand

Rugby union career
Coaching career
- Years: Team
- Rugby Southland
- 1996–1997: Highlanders (Asst.)
- 1997–1999: Glasgow
- 1999: Scotland Under 21 (Asst.)
- –: Clyde Earnscleugh

Keith Robertson (born in New Zealand) is a former head coach of Glasgow Rugby, now known as the Glasgow Warriors. He took over the club from fellow New Zealander Kevin Greene in November 1997 when it was felt that the head coach position should be a full-time post.

Previously a coach of Rugby Southland and an assistant coach of Otago Highlanders, Robertson applied for the Glasgow job when the Highlanders were on a tour of the UK. He was already earmarked as a potential candidate head coach by Jim Telfer in May 1997.

This was a difficult period for the fledgling professional rugby game in Scotland. During Robertson's tenure at the club the 4 districts of Scotland were merged into two. The Glasgow club merged with the Caledonia Reds to become known as the Glasgow Caledonians. Meanwhile, Edinburgh Rugby merged with the Border Reivers to become the Edinburgh Reivers.

Robertson's philosophy was to learn with the players and belief was key. He stated "When I come over I am not going to be saying to the boys that this or that is the way we do things in New Zealand, I fully expect that I will learn from Glasgow's players and they will tell me what they do. I enjoy motivating players to see what they can do more than dictating to them."

He also tried to put losses and rugby in perspective: "A loss in sport is a loss, you pick yourself up, examine why you lost, and then go forward.... Don't talk to me about sporting pressure. The bloke with no money in Drumchapel has more pressure than any rugby player."

Robertson thought the Glasgow team in 1998 could have competed in the Super12 and won the European Cup. In the Heineken Cup of 1998–99 Glasgow recorded only 2 wins out of the 6 group games; the others of the group consisting of Pontypridd, Benetton Treviso and Colomiers.

It was thought that Robertson struggled to cope with merging the Glasgow and Caledonia Reds players into one team.

He was replaced by Richie Dixon in January 1999. Robertson moved to helping the Scotland Under 21 side with Roy Laidlaw but left at the end of the season.

Robertson is now the coach of Clyde-Earnscleugh in New Zealand.
