= Kevin Greene (rugby union) =

NZ rugby union player (born 1949)

- Born: Kevin Michael Greene; 31 December 1949 (age 76) Hamilton, New Zealand
- Height: 1.70 m (5 ft 7 in)
- Weight: 78 kg (172 lb)
- School: Hamilton Boys' High School

Rugby union career
- Position: Halfback
Provincial / State sides
Years	Team	Apps	(Points)
1969–80	Waikato	87	
International career
Years	Team	Apps	(Points)
1976–77	New Zealand	8	(0)
Coaching career
- Years: Team
- Waikato
- Glasgow Academicals
- 1996: Cities District
- 1996–97: Glasgow
- 2002–03: Chiefs

Kevin Michael Greene (born 31 December 1949) is a former New Zealand rugby union player and coach. He was the first coach of Glasgow Warriors, when the Glasgow District side professionalised in 1996.

== Rugby Union career ==
=== Provincial career ===
A halfback, Greene represented Waikato at a provincial level.

=== International career ===
He was a member of the New Zealand national side, the All Blacks, in 1976 and 1977. He played eight games for the All Blacks, but did not appear in any test matches.

=== Coaching career ===
Greene was the coach of Waikato before finding himself in Scotland coaching amateur side Glasgow Academicals. During this time he also helped out coaching with Glasgow Academy, Greenock Wanderers and Clydebank Rugby Club.

He was to take charge of the fledgling professional side Glasgow Rugby, now Glasgow Warriors, as head coach.

This was a dual role with his coaching of Glasgow Academicals. He also was the last coach of Cities District, the combined Glasgow-Edinburgh district side, for the match against Australia in November 1996. The match was organised before the Scottish districts turned professional for the 1996-97 season; and this was the last time - and only incidence of the two professional teams - that Glasgow Warriors and Edinburgh Rugby shared their players in a combined team outwith international squads; although some players also made the Combined Scottish Districts squad in Australia's next match.

During his time managing Glasgow they entered the Heineken Cup for the first time in the 1997–98 season. Glasgow qualified out of the group stage but lost to Leicester in the quarterfinals, 19 points to 90 points.

The dual coaching role that Greene had between Glasgow Academicals and the professional side Glasgow Rugby caused friction with other amateur clubs. It was announced prior to the European Cup quarter final match that Greene would leave the Glasgow Rugby post after the Leicester match and that Keith Robertson would take over the Glasgow side in November 1997.

Glasgow's flyhalf Calum MacGregor once gave this tribute of his boss: "Kevin Greene, the Glasgow coach, is the kind of man who makes the players think for themselves, like Ian McGeechan, and I prefer that to the blood-and-thunder approach. I have enjoyed playing for Glasgow this year more than any other. I look around at the young guys in the team and they are keen and excited and that makes me feel good about the game. The players have a belief in it and a desire to win and I like that."

Greene was noted for his eye for detail in coaching. He would even change the way players ran: 'He demands they run upright, elbows in to the waist, when they give and take the ball, and they are to pass high. The reason? An upright player doesn't need to break his stride pattern as he receives a ball, unlike one that has been taught to give and take a ball at waist height and whose hands will interfere with his lifting knees. And the eyes can remain on the opposition.'

Even when leaving Glasgow to go home to New Zealand he still remained helpful to the Scottish professional side. He was to organise a training trip to New Zealand for the Glasgow Thistles; 22 players in the Glasgow District's age grades. Included in the 22 were Euan Murray and the long-term Warriors development coach Iain Monaghan.

In Super Rugby, he was assistant coach of the Chiefs in 2001, and coach in 2002 and 2003.
