= Rubislaw Playing Fields =

Sports field in Aberdeen, Scotland

Coordinates: 57°08′19″N 2°08′08″W

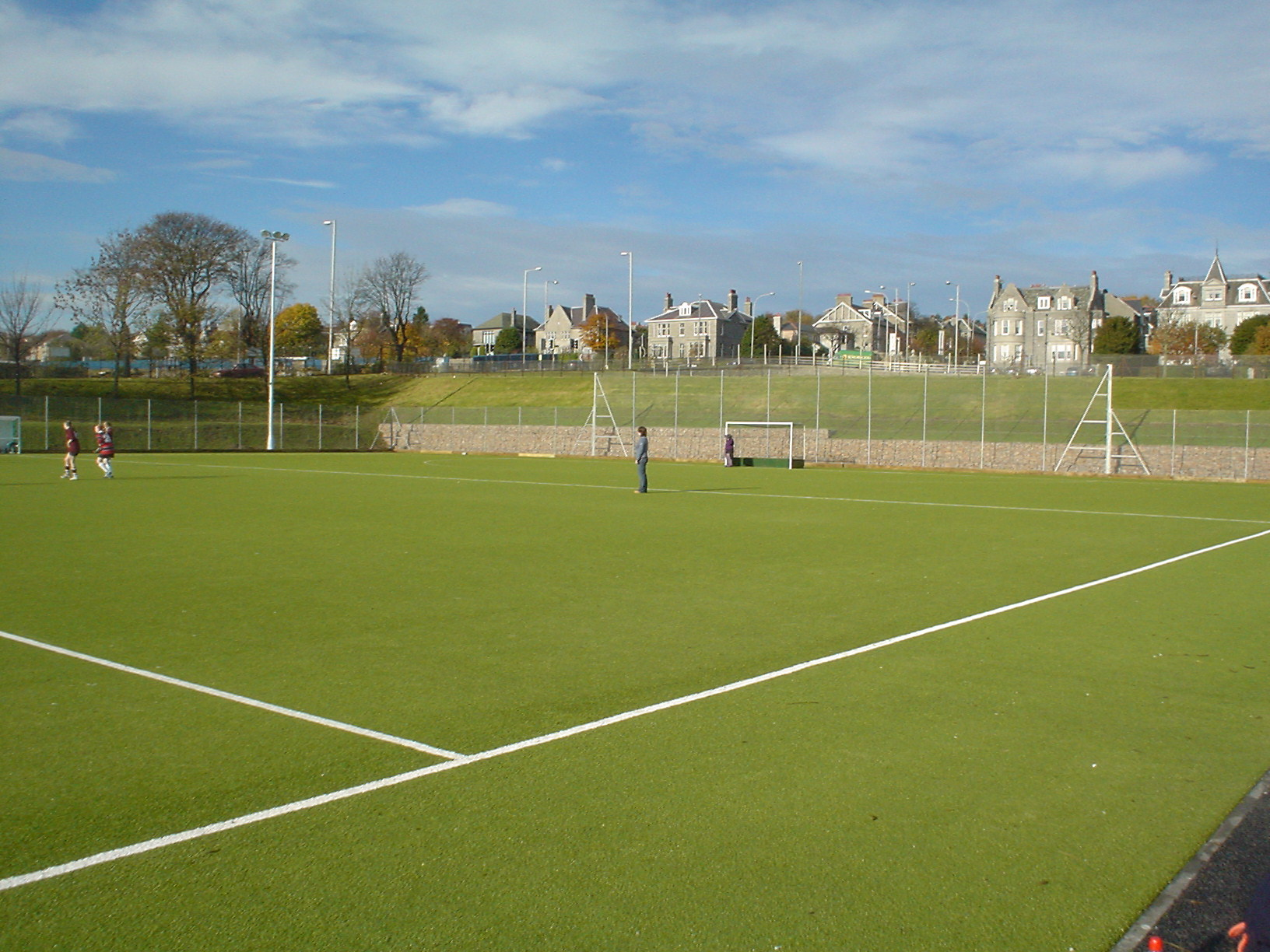
Rubislaw Astroturf hockey pitch

Rubislaw Playing Fields in Aberdeen, Scotland is an 18-acre (73,000 m^{2}) sports field for Aberdeen Grammar School and for the Scottish Premiership rugby union team Aberdeen GSFP RFC. Of course other sports are played here such as Hockey – at National league Level by Aberdeen Grammar Hockey Club, football and cricket.

The pavilion at the park was built as a war memorial to pupils from Aberdeen Grammar School who died in the first world war. An extension to the existing granite pavilion was opened in February 2009. A new Astroturf all-weather pitch has been completed which is used every day of the week.

== Aberdeen GSFP Rugby Football Club & Mannofield FC ==
Across from the astroturf pitch, are two rugby pitches. One, which has a little stand is used by the Aberdeen GSFP RFC for their home games. The stand can hold approx. 150 people with two dugouts. The whole stadium however, will accommodate around 5,000 people when at full capacity, with everyone else standing around the pitch.
