= Rowen Shepherd =

Scotland international rugby union player

- Born: Rowen James Stanley Shepherd; 25 December 1970 (age 55) Edinburgh, Scotland
- Height: 6 ft 0 in (1.83 m)
- Weight: 98 kg (15 st 6 lb)

Rugby union career
- Position: Full Back
Senior career
Years	Team	Apps	(Points)
1996–1998	Caledonia Reds		
1998–2001	Glasgow Warriors	25	(52)
Provincial / State sides
Years	Team	Apps	(Points)
- North and Midlands
International career
Years	Team	Apps	(Points)
- Scotland

Rowen Shepherd (born 25 December 1970, Edinburgh, Scotland) is a former Scottish international rugby union player, who played for Scotland. He was capped twenty times for Scotland between 1995 and 1998.
