= 1996–97 Glasgow Warriors season =

- Ground(s): Hughenden Stadium (Capacity: 6,000)
- Coach(es): (New Zealand) Kevin Greene
- Captain(s): (Scotland) Gordon Bulloch
- Top scorer: (Scotland) Calum MacGregor (34)
- Most tries: (Scotland) Derek Stark (6)
- League(s): 1996–97 Scottish Inter-District Championship
- 2nd
Team kit

The 1996–97 season was the first in the history of the Glasgow Warriors as a professional side. The Warriors rugby union provincial side was created by turning the amateur provincial side Glasgow District into a professional outfit. During this season, the newly professional side competed as Glasgow Rugby.

This season saw Glasgow Rugby compete in the Scottish Inter-District Championship and the European Challenge Cup.

== Overview ==
=== Formation of the professional side ===
District sides had a difficult metamorphosis into their respective professional sides in Scotland. The district sides were not members of the Scottish Rugby Union; the amateur clubs were. This meant that many top amateur club sides fancied their own chances of turning professional instead of the district sides.

The International Rugby Board embraced professionalism in 1995. The district versus clubs debate in Scotland meant that no Scottish sides were entered into the Heineken Cup for season 1995–96. A vote was held in early 1996 and although the debate was frosty the vote ended decisively for districts 178 - 24.

Glasgow Rugby was formed for season 1996–97.

By October 1996, the SRU had signed 36 players on professional contracts. These 36 players were distributed between Border Reivers, Caledonia Reds, Edinburgh Rugby and Glasgow Warriors.

SRU contracted players: Graeme Beveridge, Steven Brotherstone, Nick Broughton, Millan Browne, Gordon Bulloch, Darren Burns, Graeme Burns, Craig Chalmers, Graham Dall, Ian Elliot, Gareth Flockhart, Cameron Glasgow, Hugh Gilmour, Paddy Haslett, Jim Hay, Ian Jardine, Stuart Lang, Kevin McKenzie, John Manson, Cameron Murray, Scott Nichol, Guy Perrett, Bryan Redpath, Steven Reed, Stuart Reid, Brian Renwick, Rowen Shepherd, Graham Shiel, Tom Smith, Tony Stanger, Derek Stark, Barry Stewart, Rob Wainwright, Murray Wallace, Alan Watt and Scott Welsh.

=== Turbulent times ===
Some people involved in amateur club rugby didn't like the decision for the District clubs to become Scotland's representatives. Keith Robertson and Gavin Hastings had already argued against the District clubs at the SRU EGM.

Hastings then joined with former international Scotland captains Jim Aitken, Finlay Calder and David Sole to make a 'Gang of Four' which toured all over Scotland to promote the policy that club sides should represent Scotland in Europe.

Despite Greene being well-liked by the Glasgow players - Glasgow's flyhalf Calum MacGregor once gave this tribute to his boss: "Kevin Greene, the Glasgow coach, is the kind of man who makes the players think for themselves, like Ian McGeechan, and I prefer that to the blood-and-thunder approach. I have enjoyed playing for Glasgow this year more than any other. I look around at the young guys in the team and they are keen and excited and that makes me feel good about the game. The players have a belief in it and a desire to win and I like that." - this backdrop of resentment against the professional districts created a shaky start for the Glasgow team.

== Team ==
=== Coaches ===
- Head coach: (New Zealand) Kevin Greene
- Assistant coach: (New Zealand) Gordon Macpherson

=== Manager ===
Convenor / Team Manager: (Scotland) Hamish Fyfe

=== Squad ===
Hookers (Scotland) Gordon Bulloch Props (Scotland) Gordon McIlwham (England) Danny Porte (Scotland) Alan Perrie (Scotland) Brian Robertson Locks (Scotland) Charles Afuakwah (Scotland) Stephen Begley (Scotland) Shade Munro (Scotland) Malcolm Norval (Scotland) Guy Perrett	Loose forwards (Scotland) Gordon Mackay (Scotland) David McLeish (Scotland) David McVey (Scotland) John Shaw (Scotland) Fergus Wallace (Scotland) Murray Wallace Scrum halves (Scotland) Fraser Stott (Scotland) Jamie Weston Fly halves (Scotland) Kenny Baillie (Scotland) George Breckenridge (Scotland) Andrew Garry (Scotland) Cameron Little (Scotland) Calum MacGregor (Scotland) John MacLeod	Centres (Scotland) Alan Bulloch (Scotland) Harry Bassi (Scotland) Ian Jardine (Scotland) James McLaren Back Three (Scotland) James Craig (Scotland) Kenny Logan (Scotland) Glenn Metcalfe (Scotland) Derek Stark (Scotland) Craig Sangster

=== Academy players ===
None

== Player statistics ==
During the 1996–97 season, Glasgow have used 30 different players in competitive games. The table below shows the number of appearances and points scored by each player.

Position	Nation	Name	Scottish Inter-District Championship			European Conference			Total	
Position	Nation	Name	Apps (sub)	Tries	Points kicked	Apps (sub)	Tries	Points kicked	Apps (sub)	Total Pts
HK	(Scotland)	Gordon Bulloch	3	0	0	5	0	0	8	0
PR	(Scotland)	Gordon McIlwham	3	0	0	(1)	0	0	3(1)	0
PR	(Scotland)	Alan Perrie	0	0	0	5	0	0	5	0
PR	(Scotland)	Brian Robertson	3	0	0	5	0	0	8	0
LK	(Scotland)	Charles Afuakwah	0	0	0	(1)	0	0	(1)	0
LK	(Scotland)	Stephen Begley	1	0	0	4	0	0	5	0
LK	(Scotland)	Shade Munro	3	0	0	1	0	0	4	0
LK	(Scotland)	Malcolm Norval	2	0	0	5	0	0	7	0
BR	(Scotland)	Gordon Mackay	0	0	0	(3)	1	0	(3)	5
BR	(Scotland)	David McLeish	3	1	0	5	0	0	8	5
BR	(Scotland)	David McVey	0	0	0	(1)	0	0	(1)	0
BR	(Scotland)	John Shaw	0	0	0	5	0	0	5	0
BR	(Scotland)	Fergus Wallace	3	0	0	5	1	0	8	5
BR	(Scotland)	Murray Wallace	3	0	0	0	0	0	3	0
SH	(Scotland)	Jamie Weston	0	0	0	3	1	0	3	5
SH	(Scotland)	Fraser Stott	3	0	0	1(1)	0	0	4(1)	0
FH	(Scotland)	Kenny Baillie	0	0	0	(1)	0	0	(1)	0
FH	(Scotland)	George Breckenridge	0	0	0	1(2)	0	18	1(2)	18
FH	(Scotland)	Andrew Garry	3	0	0	1	0	0	4	0
FH	(Scotland)	Cameron Little	0	0	0	1(2)	1	3	1(2)	8
FH	(Scotland)	Calum MacGregor	3	1	17	1	0	12	4	34
FH	(Scotland)	John MacLeod	0	0	0	3	0	0	3	0
CE	(Scotland)	Harry Bassi	0	0	0	2	0	0	2	0
CE	(Scotland)	Alan Bulloch	1	0	0	5	2	0	6	10
CE	(Scotland)	Ian Jardine	0	0	0	1	0	0	1	0
WG	(Scotland)	James Craig	2	3	0	2	2	0	4	25
WG	(Scotland)	Kenny Logan	3	3	6	2	2	0	5	31
WG	(Scotland)	Derek Stark	3	2	0	4	4	0	7	30
FB	(Scotland)	Glenn Metcalfe	1	0	0	4(1)	1	0	5(1)	5
FB	(Scotland)	Craig Sangster	2(1)	0	0	3(2)	0	5	5(3)	5

== Staff movements ==
=== Coaches ===
==== Personnel in ====
- (New Zealand) Kevin Greene from (Scotland) Glasgow Academicals
- (New Zealand) Gordon Macpherson from West of Scotland

==== Personnel out ====
None

== Player movements ==
=== Academy promotions ===
None

=== Player transfers ===
==== In ====
None

==== Out ====
None

== Competitions ==
=== Pre-season and friendlies ===
None.

=== European Challenge Cup ===
The previous year's Scottish Inter-District Championship was a forgettable one for Glasgow who finished last. This meant that the SRU did not enter Glasgow in the Heineken Cup for the new season 1996–97. Instead Glasgow entered the lower European tournament, the Challenge Cup, or as it was then known the European Conference, in Pool A. This was one of 4 Pools in the tournament and Glasgow was Scotland's only representative.

Kevin Greene, the Glasgow coach, later admitted that preparation for Glasgow's first foray into Europe was poor. He recalled the first game against Newbridge: "We had no information at all on Newbridge. We should at least have had some data and perhaps even a video, but the SRU had nothing. It made preparation very awkward."

==== Pool A ====
Team	P	W	D	L	Tries for	Tries against	Try diff	Points for	Points against	Points diff	Pts
(France) Agen	5	5	0	0	20	9	+11	156	82	+74	10
(France) Montferrand	5	4	0	1	30	8	+22	211	74	+137	8
(England) Sale Sharks	5	3	0	2	18	14	+4	166	115	+51	6
(Wales) Newport	5	2	0	3	14	19	−15	98	158	−60	4
(Scotland) Glasgow	5	1	0	4	15	30	−15	113	202	−89	2
(Wales) Newbridge	5	0	0	5	16	33	−17	106	219	−113	0
Source : www.ercrugby.com

==== Results ====
===== Round 1 =====
12 October 1996

Newbridge RFC (Wales)	38-62	(Scotland) Glasgow
Try: Leighton Winder; Hayden Jeffreys; Joe Powell; Simon Jenkins; Glyn Harding; Con: Jason Williams x 4	Preview; Report	Try: Kenny Logan x 2 Derek Stark x 4 Alan Bulloch x 2 Glenn Metcalfe; Cameron Little; Con: Calum MacGregor x 6

The Welfare Ground
Referee: Ashley Rowden (RFU)

===== Round 2 =====
16 October 1996

Glasgow (Scotland)	9 – 29	(England) Sale Sharks
Pen: George Breckenridge x 3	Preview; Preview; Report	Try: John Fowler x 3 Con: Andy Griffin; Pen: Andy Griffin x 4

Hughenden Stadium
Referee: Bernard Perez (FFR)

===== Round 3 =====
19 October 1996

Montferrand (France)	76 – 9	(Scotland) Glasgow
Try: Gilles Darlet; Raphael Saint-Andre; Gérald Merceron; David Bory x 2 Christophe Larrue; Eric Lecomte; Arnaud Costes; Jean-Marc Lhermet; Nicolas Nadau; Con: Gérald Merceron x 6 Pen: Gérald Merceron; Drop: Eric Nicol	Preview; Preview; Report; Report	Pen: George Breckenridge x 3

Stade Marcel-Michelin
Referee: Gerry Wallis (RFU)

===== Round 4 =====
26 October 1996
2.30pm

Newport RFC (Wales)	25-10	(Scotland) Glasgow
Try: David Smith; Martyn Lleweyen; Shaun Connor; Con: Shaun Connor; Alex Lawson; Pen: Shaun Connor x2	Preview; Preview; Report; Report; Report	Try: Fergus Wallace; Con: Craig Sangster; Pen: Craig Sangster

Rodney Parade
Referee: Ed Morrison (RFU)

===== Round 5 =====
30 October 1996

Glasgow (Scotland)	23 – 34	(France) Agen
Try: James Craig x 2 Jamie Weston; Gordon Mackay; Pen: Cameron Little	Preview; Preview; Report; Report	Try: Vincent Thomas; Laurent Loubere; Jean-Francois Mateo; David Lagrange x 2 Con: Stephane Prosper x 3 Drop: Stephane Prosper

Hughenden
Referee: Claudio Giacomel (FIR)

=== Scottish Inter-District Championship ===
It was decided that the Scottish Inter-District Championship places would decide which Scottish sides would enter the Heineken Cup and which would enter the European Challenge Cup.

The 4 newly professional district teams Glasgow Rugby, Edinburgh Rugby, Border Reivers and Caledonia Reds would play off for the Championship. As this decided European places it was decided that it was not appropriate for London Scottish or a Scottish Exiles side to be invited into the Championship.

Each team would play one another only once, swapping home and away each year. With only 4 teams this meant that the Championship was decided by each team playing just 3 matches.

The top 3 sides qualified for the Heineken Cup next season and the fourth qualified for the Challenge Cup. Due to the weather Glasgow's match against Edinburgh was switched to Murrayfield as its undersoil heating was best placed to deal with frost. Glasgow lost their final match against Caledonia Reds and finished 2nd behind the Reds. Caledonia Reds, the Border Reivers and Glasgow qualified for the Heineken Cup for the next season.

==== 1996-97 League Table ====
Team	P	W	D	L	PF	PA	+/-	Pts
Caledonia Reds	3	2	1	0	77	53	+24	5
Glasgow	3	2	0	1	73	57	+16	4
Border Reivers	3	1	1	1	59	61	-2	3
Edinburgh	3	0	0	3	35	69	-34	0

==== Results ====
===== Round 1 =====
22 December 1996

Glasgow	23 – 13	Edinburgh
Try: Calum MacGregor; Derek Stark; Kenny Logan; Con: Kenny Logan; Pen: Calum MacGregor; Drop: Calum MacGregor	Preview; Report; Report	Try: Patterson; Con: Duncan Hodge; Pen: Duncan Hodge x 2

Murrayfield Stadium
Referee: K McCartney

===== Round 2 =====
29 December 1996

Border Reivers	24 – 36	Glasgow
Try: Bennett; Nichol; Davidson; Pen: Parker x 3	Preview; Report; Report	Try: Kenny Logan x 2 James Craig x 2 David McLeish; Con: Calum MacGregor x 4 Pen: Calum MacGregor

Murrayfield Stadium
Referee: Jim Fleming

===== Round 3 =====
5 January 1997

Caledonia Reds	20 – 14	Glasgow
Try: Shaun Longstaff x 2 John Kerr; Con: Mark McKenzie; Pen: Mark McKenzie	Report; Report	Try: Derek Stark; James Craig; Con: Kenny Logan x 2

Murrayfield Stadium
Referee: I Ramage

== Competitive debuts this season ==
A player's nationality shown is taken from the nationality at the highest honour for the national side obtained; or if never capped internationally their place of birth. Senior caps take precedence over junior caps or place of birth; junior caps take precedence over place of birth. A player's nationality at debut may be different from the nationality shown. Combination sides like the British and Irish Lions or Pacific Islanders are not national sides, or nationalities.

Players in BOLD font have been capped by their senior international XV side as nationality shown.

Players in Italic font have capped either by their international 7s side; or by the international XV 'A' side as nationality shown.

Players in normal font have not been capped at senior level.

A position in parentheses indicates that the player debuted as a substitute. A player may have made a prior debut for Glasgow Warriors in a non-competitive match, 'A' match or 7s match; these matches are not listed.

Tournaments where competitive debut made:

**Scottish Inter-District Championship**	**Welsh–Scottish League**	**WRU Challenge Cup**	**Celtic League**	**Celtic Cup**	**1872 Cup**	**Pro12**	**Pro14**	**Rainbow Cup**	**United Rugby Championship**	**European Challenge Cup**	**Heineken Cup / European Champions Cup**

Crosshatching indicates a jointly hosted match.

Number	Player nationality	Name	Position	Date of debut	Venue	Stadium	Opposition nationality	Opposition side	Tournament	Match result	Scoring debut
1	(Scotland)	Alan Perrie	Prop	1996-10-12	Away	The Welfare Ground	(Wales)	Newbridge	European Challenge Cup	Win	Nil
2	(Scotland)	**Gordon Bulloch**	Hooker	1996-10-12	Away	The Welfare Ground	(Wales)	Newbridge	European Challenge Cup	Win	Nil
3	(Scotland)	Brian Robertson	Prop	1996-10-12	Away	The Welfare Ground	(Wales)	Newbridge	European Challenge Cup	Win	Nil
4	(Scotland)	Stephen Begley	Lock	1996-10-12	Away	The Welfare Ground	(Wales)	Newbridge	European Challenge Cup	Win	Nil
5	(Scotland)	Malcolm Norval	Lock	1996-10-12	Away	The Welfare Ground	(Wales)	Newbridge	European Challenge Cup	Win	Nil
6	(Scotland)	Fergus Wallace	Flanker	1996-10-12	Away	The Welfare Ground	(Wales)	Newbridge	European Challenge Cup	Win	Nil
7	(Scotland)	John Shaw	Flanker	1996-10-12	Away	The Welfare Ground	(Wales)	Newbridge	European Challenge Cup	Win	Nil
8	(Scotland)	David McLeish	No. 8	1996-10-12	Away	The Welfare Ground	(Wales)	Newbridge	European Challenge Cup	Win	Nil
9	(Scotland)	Fraser Stott	Scrum half	1996-10-12	Away	The Welfare Ground	(Wales)	Newbridge	European Challenge Cup	Win	Nil
10	(Scotland)	Calum MacGregor	Fly half	1996-10-12	Away	The Welfare Ground	(Wales)	Newbridge	European Challenge Cup	Win	12 pts
11	(Scotland)	**Glenn Metcalfe**	Wing	1996-10-12	Away	The Welfare Ground	(Wales)	Newbridge	European Challenge Cup	Win	5 pts
12	(Scotland)	Harry Bassi	Centre	1996-10-12	Away	The Welfare Ground	(Wales)	Newbridge	European Challenge Cup	Win	Nil
13	(Scotland)	**Alan Bulloch**	Centre	1996-10-12	Away	The Welfare Ground	(Wales)	Newbridge	European Challenge Cup	Win	10 pts
14	(Scotland)	**Derek Stark**	Wing	1996-10-12	Away	The Welfare Ground	(Wales)	Newbridge	European Challenge Cup	Win	20 pts
15	(Scotland)	**Kenny Logan**	Full back	1996-10-12	Away	The Welfare Ground	(Wales)	Newbridge	European Challenge Cup	Win	10 pts
16	(Scotland)	Cameron Little	(Scrum half)	1996-10-12	Away	The Welfare Ground	(Wales)	Newbridge	European Challenge Cup	Win	5 pts
17	(Scotland)	George Breckenridge	(Wing)	1996-10-12	Away	The Welfare Ground	(Wales)	Newbridge	European Challenge Cup	Win	Nil
18	(Scotland)	Craig Sangster	(full back)	1996-10-12	Away	The Welfare Ground	(Wales)	Newbridge	European Challenge Cup	Win	Nil
19	(Scotland)	Jamie Weston	Scrum half	1996-10-16	Home	Hughenden Stadium	(England)	Sale Sharks	European Challenge Cup	Loss	Nil
20	(Scotland)	John MacLeod	Fly half	1996-10-16	Home	Hughenden Stadium	(England)	Sale Sharks	European Challenge Cup	Loss	Nil
21	(Scotland)	Kenny Baillie	(Fly-half)	1996-10-16	Home	Hughenden Stadium	(England)	Sale Sharks	European Challenge Cup	Loss	Nil
22	(Scotland)	Gordon Mackay	(Flanker)	1996-10-16	Home	Hughenden Stadium	(England)	Sale Sharks	European Challenge Cup	Loss	Nil
23	(Scotland)	**Murray Wallace**	Flanker	1996-10-19	Away	Stade Marcel-Michelin	(France)	AS Montferrand	European Challenge Cup	Loss	Nil
24	(Ghana)	Charles Afuakwah	Lock	1996-10-19	Away	Stade Marcel-Michelin	(France)	AS Montferrand	European Challenge Cup	Loss	Nil
25	(Scotland)	**Shade Munro**	Lock	1996-10-26	Away	Rodney Parade	(Wales)	Newport	European Challenge Cup	Loss	Nil
26	(Scotland)	**James Craig**	Wing	1996-10-26	Away	Rodney Parade	(Wales)	Newport	European Challenge Cup	Loss	Nil
27	(Scotland)	**Ian Jardine**	Centre	1996-10-26	Away	Rodney Parade	(Wales)	Newport	European Challenge Cup	Loss	Nil
28	(Scotland)	David McVey	(No. 8)	1996-10-26	Away	Rodney Parade	(Wales)	Newport	European Challenge Cup	Loss	Nil
29	(Scotland)	Andrew Garry	Fly half	1996-10-30	Home	Hughenden Stadium	(France)	Agen	European Challenge Cup	Loss	Nil
30	(Scotland)	**Gordon McIlwham**	Prop	1996-10-30	Home	Hughenden Stadium	(France)	Agen	European Challenge Cup	Loss	Nil
31	(England)	Danny Porte	(Prop)	1997-01-05	Away	Murrayfield Stadium	(Scotland)	Caledonia Reds	Scottish Inter-District Championship	Loss	Nil

== Sponsorship ==
=== Main Sponsor ===
- Dundas & Wilson

=== Official kit supplier ===
Canterbury
