= List of Glasgow Warriors players =

List of Glasgow Warriors rugby union players is a list of people who have played for Glasgow Warriors from 1996 - 1997 season to present.

This list only includes players who have played in a competitive match for the professional club in the tournaments listed below. Other professional players for the club can be found in the broader Category:Glasgow Warriors players.

Players who played for Glasgow in their amateur period (1872-1996), when known as Glasgow District, can be found in the Category:Glasgow District (rugby union) players.

Numbers given are the official 'Warriors Numbers' assigned to their players.

A player's nationality shown is taken from the nationality at the highest honour for the national side obtained; or if never capped internationally their place of birth. Senior caps take precedence over junior caps or place of birth; junior caps take precedence over place of birth. A player's nationality at debut may be different from the nationality shown. Combination sides like the British and Irish Lions or Pacific Islanders are not national sides, or nationalities.

Players in BOLD font have been capped by their senior international XV side as nationality shown.

Players in Italic font have capped either by their international 7s side; or by the international XV 'A' side as nationality shown.

Players in normal font have not been capped at senior level.

A position in parentheses indicates that the player debuted as a substitute. A player may have made a prior debut for Glasgow Warriors in a non-competitive match, 'A' match or 7s match; these matches are not listed.

Tournaments where competitive debut made:

**Scottish Inter-District Championship**	**Welsh–Scottish League**	**WRU Challenge Cup**	**Celtic League**	**Celtic Cup**	**1872 Cup**	**Pro12**	**Pro14**	**Rainbow Cup**	**United Rugby Championship**	**European Challenge Cup**	**Heineken Cup / European Champions Cup**

Crosshatching indicates a jointly hosted match.

Number	Player nationality	Name	Position	Date of debut	Venue	Stadium	Opposition nationality	Opposition side	Tournament	Match result	Scoring debut
1	(Scotland)	Alan Perrie	Prop	1996-10-12	Away	The Welfare Ground	(Wales)	Newbridge	European Challenge Cup	Win	Nil
2	(Scotland)	**Gordon Bulloch**	Hooker	1996-10-12	Away	The Welfare Ground	(Wales)	Newbridge	European Challenge Cup	Win	Nil
3	(Scotland)	Brian Robertson	Prop	1996-10-12	Away	The Welfare Ground	(Wales)	Newbridge	European Challenge Cup	Win	Nil
4	(Scotland)	Stephen Begley	Lock	1996-10-12	Away	The Welfare Ground	(Wales)	Newbridge	European Challenge Cup	Win	Nil
5	(Scotland)	Malcolm Norval	Lock	1996-10-12	Away	The Welfare Ground	(Wales)	Newbridge	European Challenge Cup	Win	Nil
6	(Scotland)	Fergus Wallace	Flanker	1996-10-12	Away	The Welfare Ground	(Wales)	Newbridge	European Challenge Cup	Win	Nil
7	(Scotland)	John Shaw	Flanker	1996-10-12	Away	The Welfare Ground	(Wales)	Newbridge	European Challenge Cup	Win	Nil
8	(Scotland)	David McLeish	No. 8	1996-10-12	Away	The Welfare Ground	(Wales)	Newbridge	European Challenge Cup	Win	Nil
9	(Scotland)	Fraser Stott	Scrum half	1996-10-12	Away	The Welfare Ground	(Wales)	Newbridge	European Challenge Cup	Win	Nil
10	(Scotland)	Calum MacGregor	Fly half	1996-10-12	Away	The Welfare Ground	(Wales)	Newbridge	European Challenge Cup	Win	12 pts
11	(Scotland)	**Glenn Metcalfe**	Wing	1996-10-12	Away	The Welfare Ground	(Wales)	Newbridge	European Challenge Cup	Win	5 pts
12	(Scotland)	Harry Bassi	Centre	1996-10-12	Away	The Welfare Ground	(Wales)	Newbridge	European Challenge Cup	Win	Nil
13	(Scotland)	**Alan Bulloch**	Centre	1996-10-12	Away	The Welfare Ground	(Wales)	Newbridge	European Challenge Cup	Win	10 pts
14	(Scotland)	**Derek Stark**	Wing	1996-10-12	Away	The Welfare Ground	(Wales)	Newbridge	European Challenge Cup	Win	20 pts
15	(Scotland)	**Kenny Logan**	Full Back	1996-10-12	Away	The Welfare Ground	(Wales)	Newbridge	European Challenge Cup	Win	10 pts
16	(Scotland)	Cameron Little	(Scrum half)	1996-10-12	Away	The Welfare Ground	(Wales)	Newbridge	European Challenge Cup	Win	5 pts
17	(Scotland)	George Breckenridge	(Wing)	1996-10-12	Away	The Welfare Ground	(Wales)	Newbridge	European Challenge Cup	Win	Nil
18	(Scotland)	Craig Sangster	(Full Back)	1996-10-12	Away	The Welfare Ground	(Wales)	Newbridge	European Challenge Cup	Win	Nil
19	(Scotland)	Jamie Weston	Scrum half	1996-10-16	Home	Hughenden Stadium	(England)	Sale Sharks	European Challenge Cup	Loss	Nil
20	(Scotland)	John MacLeod	Fly half	1996-10-16	Home	Hughenden Stadium	(England)	Sale Sharks	European Challenge Cup	Loss	Nil
21	(Scotland)	Kenny Baillie	(Fly-half)	1996-10-16	Home	Hughenden Stadium	(England)	Sale Sharks	European Challenge Cup	Loss	Nil
22	(Scotland)	Gordon Mackay	(Flanker)	1996-10-16	Home	Hughenden Stadium	(England)	Sale Sharks	European Challenge Cup	Loss	Nil
23	(Scotland)	**Murray Wallace**	Flanker	1996-10-19	Away	Stade Marcel-Michelin	(France)	AS Montferrand	European Challenge Cup	Loss	Nil
24	(Ghana)	Charles Afuakwah	Lock	1996-10-19	Away	Stade Marcel-Michelin	(France)	AS Montferrand	European Challenge Cup	Loss	Nil
25	(Scotland)	**Shade Munro**	Lock	1996-10-26	Away	Rodney Parade	(Wales)	Newport	European Challenge Cup	Loss	Nil
26	(Scotland)	**James Craig**	Wing	1996-10-26	Away	Rodney Parade	(Wales)	Newport	European Challenge Cup	Loss	Nil
27	(Scotland)	**Ian Jardine**	Centre	1996-10-26	Away	Rodney Parade	(Wales)	Newport	European Challenge Cup	Loss	Nil
28	(Scotland)	David McVey	(No. 8)	1996-10-26	Away	Rodney Parade	(Wales)	Newport	European Challenge Cup	Loss	Nil
29	(Scotland)	Andrew Garry	Fly half	1996-10-30	Home	Hughenden Stadium	(France)	Agen	European Challenge Cup	Loss	Nil
30	(Scotland)	**Gordon McIlwham**	Prop	1996-10-30	Home	Hughenden Stadium	(France)	Agen	European Challenge Cup	Loss	Nil
31	(England)	Danny Porte	(Prop)	1997-01-05	Away	Murrayfield Stadium	(Scotland)	Caledonia Reds	Scottish Inter-District Championship	Loss	Nil
32	(Cook Islands)	**Mike Beckham**	Prop	1997-09-08	Away	Ravenhill Stadium	(Ireland)	Ulster	European Champions Cup	Win	Nil
33	(Scotland)	Guy Perrett	Lock	1997-09-08	Away	Ravenhill Stadium	(Ireland)	Ulster	European Champions Cup	Win	Nil
34	(Scotland)	Iain Sinclair	Flanker	1997-09-08	Away	Ravenhill Stadium	(Ireland)	Ulster	European Champions Cup	Win	Nil
35	(Cook Islands)	**Tommy Hayes**	Fly half	1997-09-08	Away	Ravenhill Stadium	(Ireland)	Ulster	European Champions Cup	Win	8 pts
36	(Scotland)	Matt McGrandles	Centre	1997-09-08	Away	Ravenhill Stadium	(Ireland)	Ulster	European Champions Cup	Win	Nil
37	(Scotland)	Chris Simmers	Centre	1997-09-08	Away	Ravenhill Stadium	(Ireland)	Ulster	European Champions Cup	Win	Nil
38	(Scotland)	Alan Kittle	Prop	1997-09-08	Away	Ravenhill Stadium	(Ireland)	Ulster	European Champions Cup	Win	Nil
39	(Scotland)	Danny Ablett	(Centre)	1997-09-21	Home	Scotstoun Stadium	(Wales)	Swansea	European Champions Cup	Win	Nil
40	(Scotland)	Gavin Fraser	Centre	1997-10-04	Away	St. Helen's	(Wales)	Swansea	European Champions Cup	Win	Nil
41	(Scotland)	Chris Docherty	Hooker	1997-11-01	Away	Welford Road Stadium	(England)	Leicester Tigers	European Champions Cup	Loss	Nil
42	(Scotland)	**Tom Smith**	Prop	1998-09-13	Away	Easter Road	(Scotland)	Edinburgh	Scottish Inter-District Championship	Win	Nil
43	(Scotland)	**Kevin McKenzie**	Hooker	1998-09-13	Away	Easter Road	(Scotland)	Edinburgh	Scottish Inter-District Championship	Win	Nil
44	(Scotland)	Willie Anderson	Prop	1998-09-13	Away	Easter Road	(Scotland)	Edinburgh	Scottish Inter-District Championship	Win	Nil
45	(Scotland)	**Stuart Grimes**	Lock	1998-09-13	Away	Easter Road	(Scotland)	Edinburgh	Scottish Inter-District Championship	Win	Nil
46	(Scotland)	**Stewart Campbell**	Lock	1998-09-13	Away	Easter Road	(Scotland)	Edinburgh	Scottish Inter-District Championship	Win	Nil
47	(Scotland)	**Jason White**	No. 8	1998-09-13	Away	Easter Road	(Scotland)	Edinburgh	Scottish Inter-District Championship	Win	Nil
48	(New Zealand)	Aaron Collins	Centre	1998-09-13	Away	Easter Road	(Scotland)	Edinburgh	Scottish Inter-District Championship	Win	Nil
49	(Scotland)	**Rowen Shepherd**	Full Back	1998-09-13	Away	Easter Road	(Scotland)	Edinburgh	Scottish Inter-District Championship	Win	5 pts
50	(Scotland)	**Shaun Longstaff**	Wing	1998-09-13	Away	Easter Road	(Scotland)	Edinburgh	Scottish Inter-District Championship	Win	Nil
51	(Scotland)	**Rob Wainwright**	Flanker	1998-09-13	Away	Easter Road	(Scotland)	Edinburgh	Scottish Inter-District Championship	Win	Nil
52	(Scotland)	Gareth Flockhart	Flanker	1998-09-13	Away	Easter Road	(Scotland)	Edinburgh	Scottish Inter-District Championship	Win	Nil
53	(Scotland)	**Gordon Simpson**	No. 8	1998-09-20	Home	Firhill Stadium	(Wales)	Pontypridd	European Champions Cup	Loss	Nil
54	(Scotland)	**Derrick Patterson**	Scrum half	1998-09-20	Home	Firhill Stadium	(Wales)	Pontypridd	European Champions Cup	Loss	Nil
55	(Scotland)	Martin Waite	Flanker	1998-09-26	Away	Stadio Comunale di Monigo	(Italy)	Benetton Treviso	European Champions Cup	Loss	Nil
56	(South Africa)	Luke Smith	Fly half	1998-11-01	Away	Stade Michel Bendichou	(France)	US Colomiers	European Champions Cup	Loss	Nil
57	(Scotland)	**John Leslie**	Centre	1999-01-03	Away	Netherdale	(Scotland)	Edinburgh	Scottish Inter-District Championship	Loss	Nil
58	(Scotland)	**Jon Petrie**	Flanker	1999-01-03	Away	Netherdale	(Scotland)	Edinburgh	Scottish Inter-District Championship	Loss	Nil
59	(Scotland)	**John Manson**	Prop	1999-01-10	Away	Eugene Cross Park	(Wales)	Ebbw Vale	WRU Challenge Cup	Win	Nil
60	(Scotland)	**Graeme Beveridge**	Scrum half	1999-01-25	Away	Rodney Parade	(Wales)	Newport	WRU Challenge Cup	Win	Nil
61	(Scotland)	Gavin Scott	Hooker	1999-01-27	Away	Brewery Field	(Wales)	Bridgend	WRU Challenge Cup	Loss	Nil
62	(Scotland)	Steve Griffiths	Lock	1999-09-03	Home	Bridgehaugh Park	(Wales)	Pontypridd	Welsh–Scottish League	Loss	Nil
63	(Scotland)	Darren Burns	Lock	1999-09-03	Home	Bridgehaugh Park	(Wales)	Pontypridd	Welsh–Scottish League	Loss	Nil
64	(Scotland)	**Donnie Macfadyen**	Flanker	1999-09-03	Home	Bridgehaugh Park	(Wales)	Pontypridd	Welsh–Scottish League	Loss	Nil
65	(Scotland)	**Andy Nicol**	Scrum half	1999-09-03	Home	Bridgehaugh Park	(Wales)	Pontypridd	Welsh–Scottish League	Loss	Nil
66	(Scotland)	**Rory Kerr**	Wing	1999-09-03	Home	Bridgehaugh Park	(Wales)	Pontypridd	Welsh–Scottish League	Loss	Nil
67	(Scotland)	Jonathan Stuart	Centre	1999-09-03	Home	Bridgehaugh Park	(Wales)	Pontypridd	Welsh–Scottish League	Loss	Nil
68	(Scotland)	Barry Irving	Fly half	1999-09-03	Home	Bridgehaugh Park	(Wales)	Pontypridd	Welsh–Scottish League	Loss	Nil
69	(Scotland)	**Alan Watt**	Prop	1999-09-03	Home	Bridgehaugh Park	(Wales)	Pontypridd	Welsh–Scottish League	Loss	Nil
70	(Scotland)	**Dougie Hall**	Hooker	1999-09-11	Away	Netherdale	(Scotland)	Edinburgh	Welsh–Scottish League	Win	Nil
71	(Scotland)	Ian McInroy	Centre	1999-09-11	Away	Netherdale	(Scotland)	Edinburgh	Welsh–Scottish League	Win	Nil
72	(Scotland)	**Craig Chalmers**	Fly half	1999-09-18	Home	Millbrae	(Wales)	Ebbw Vale	Welsh–Scottish League	Loss	3 pts
73	(Scotland)	**Dave Hilton**	Prop	1999-09-18	Home	Millbrae	(Wales)	Ebbw Vale	Welsh–Scottish League	Loss	Nil
74	(Scotland)	Alan Brown	Prop	1999-09-25	Away	St. Helen's	(Wales)	Swansea	Welsh–Scottish League	Loss	Nil
75	(Australia)	Ashley Bond	Centre	1999-10-30	Away	Broadacre	(Wales)	Dunvant	Welsh–Scottish League	Win	Nil
76	(Scotland)	**Roland Reid**	Centre	1999-11-12	Home	Hughenden Stadium	(Wales)	Neath	Welsh–Scottish League	Win	Nil
77	(Scotland)	Danny Herrington	Prop	2000-02-12	Away	Brewery Field	(Wales)	Bridgend	Welsh–Scottish League	Loss	Nil
78	(New Zealand)	Michael Bartlett	Wing	2000-05-12	Away	The Gnoll	(Wales)	Neath	Welsh–Scottish League	Loss	Nil
79	(Scotland)	**Jon Steel**	Wing	2000-08-26	Away	Virginia Park	(Wales)	Caerphilly	Welsh–Scottish League	Loss	Nil
80	(Scotland)	Mark McKenzie	(Full Back)	2000-08-26	Away	Virginia Park	(Wales)	Caerphilly	Welsh–Scottish League	Loss	Nil
81	(Scotland)	Chris Black	Scrum half	2000-09-02	Home	Hughenden Stadium	(Wales)	Cross Keys	Welsh–Scottish League	Win	Nil
82	(New Zealand)	Graeme Young	(Scrum half)	2000-09-02	Home	Hughenden Stadium	(Wales)	Cross Keys	Welsh–Scottish League	Win	Nil
83	(Scotland)	Lee Harrison	Prop	2000-09-05	Away	Brewery Field	(Wales)	Bridgend	Welsh–Scottish League	Loss	Nil
84	(Scotland)	Carlo di Ciacca	Hooker	2000-10-22	Home	Hughenden Stadium	(France)	Pau	European Champions Cup	Loss	Nil
85	(Scotland)	**James McLaren**	Centre	2000-10-22	Home	Hughenden Stadium	(France)	Pau	European Champions Cup	Loss	Nil
86	(Scotland)	**Euan Murray**	Prop	2000-10-22	Home	Hughenden Stadium	(France)	Pau	European Champions Cup	Loss	Nil
87	(Scotland)	Colin Stewart	Lock	2000-12-02	Home	McDiarmid Park	(Wales)	Swansea	Welsh–Scottish League	Loss	Nil
88	(Scotland)	**Andrew Henderson**	Centre	2001-04-15	Home	Hughenden Stadium	(Wales)	Caerphilly	Welsh–Scottish League	Win	Nil
89	(Scotland)	Kenny Sinclair	(Scrum half)	2001-05-05	Away	St. Helen's	(Wales)	Swansea	Welsh–Scottish League	Loss	Nil
90	(Scotland)	Scott Hutton	(Lock)	2001-05-05	Away	St. Helen's	(Wales)	Swansea	Welsh–Scottish League	Loss	Nil
91	(Scotland)	Graeme Kiddie	Full Back	2001-08-17	Away	Donnybrook Stadium	(Ireland)	Leinster	Celtic League	Loss	Nil
92	(Australia)	**Cameron Blades**	(Prop)	2001-08-17	Away	Donnybrook Stadium	(Ireland)	Leinster	Celtic League	Loss	Nil
93	(Scotland)	Nathan Ross	(Lock)	2001-08-17	Away	Donnybrook Stadium	(Ireland)	Leinster	Celtic League	Loss	Nil
94	(Scotland)	**Andrew Hall**	Lock	2001-08-29	Away	Brewery Field	(Wales)	Bridgend	Celtic League	Loss	Nil
95	(Scotland)	Ben Prescott	(Prop)	2001-11-04	Home	Hughenden Stadium	(Wales)	Cardiff	European Champions Cup	Win	Nil
96	(Scotland)	Tom McLaren	Flanker	2002-01-19	Away	Cardiff Arms Park	(Wales)	Cardiff	Welsh–Scottish League	Loss	Nil
97	(Scotland)	Calvin Howarth	(Fly half)	2002-04-10	Home	Hughenden Stadium	(Wales)	Bridgend	Welsh–Scottish League	Win	3 pts
98	(Scotland)	Richard Maxton	(Flanker)	2002-04-27	Away	Eugene Cross Park	(Wales)	Ebbw Vale	Welsh–Scottish League	Win	Nil
99	(Scotland)	Andrew Kelly	(Prop)	2002-05-10	Home	Hughenden Stadium	(Wales)	Swansea	Welsh–Scottish League	Win	Nil
100	(Scotland)	**Chris Cusiter**	(Scrum half)	2002-05-10	Home	Hughenden Stadium	(Wales)	Swansea	Welsh–Scottish League	Win	Nil
101	(Scotland)	**Stuart Moffat**	Full Back	2002-08-31	Away	Cardiff Arms Park	(Wales)	Cardiff	Celtic League	Win	Nil
102	(Scotland)	**Andrew Wilson**	(Flanker)	2002-08-31	Away	Cardiff Arms Park	(Wales)	Cardiff	Celtic League	Win	Nil
103	(Australia)	Ben Daly	Hooker	2002-09-06	Home	Hughenden Stadium	(Ireland)	Leinster	Celtic League	Win	Nil
104	(Scotland)	Rory McKay	(Flanker)	2002-09-20	Home	Hughenden Stadium	(Wales)	Bridgend	Celtic League	Win	Nil
105	(New Zealand)	Joe Naufahu	Centre	2002-12-26	Home	Hughenden Stadium	(Scotland)	Edinburgh	Scottish Inter-District Championship	Draw	5 pts
106	(Samoa)	**Opeta Palepoi**	Lock	2002-12-31	Away	Netherdale	(Scotland)	Border Reivers	Scottish Inter-District Championship	Loss	Nil
107	(Scotland)	**Scott Lawson**	(Hooker)	2002-12-31	Away	Netherdale	(Scotland)	Border Reivers	Scottish Inter-District Championship	Loss	Nil
108	(Scotland)	**Fergus Thomson**	(Hooker)	2003-01-10	Away	Heywood Road	(England)	Sale Sharks	European Champions Cup	Loss	Nil
109	(New Zealand)	Simon Gunn	Hooker	2003-09-05	Home	Hughenden Stadium	(Wales)	Cardiff Blues	Celtic League	Win	Nil
110	(Scotland)	**Cameron Mather**	Flanker	2003-09-05	Home	Hughenden Stadium	(Wales)	Cardiff Blues	Celtic League	Win	Nil
111	(Australia)	Paul Dearlove	Flanker	2003-09-05	Home	Hughenden Stadium	(Wales)	Cardiff Blues	Celtic League	Win	Nil
112	(Scotland)	**Sam Pinder**	Scrum half	2003-09-05	Home	Hughenden Stadium	(Wales)	Cardiff Blues	Celtic League	Win	5 pts
113	(England)	Gareth Maclure	Wing	2003-09-05	Home	Hughenden Stadium	(Wales)	Cardiff Blues	Celtic League	Win	5 pts
114	(Scotland)	**Graeme Morrison**	Centre	2003-09-05	Home	Hughenden Stadium	(Wales)	Cardiff Blues	Celtic League	Win	Nil
115	(Scotland)	**Sean Lamont**	(Wing)	2003-09-05	Home	Hughenden Stadium	(Wales)	Cardiff Blues	Celtic League	Win	Nil
116	(Scotland)	**Matt Proudfoot**	Prop	2003-09-12	Away	Ravenhill Stadium	(Ireland)	Ulster	Celtic League	Loss	Nil
117	(England)	Joe Beardshaw	Lock	2003-09-19	Away	Brewery Field	(Wales)	Celtic Warriors	Celtic Cup	Win	Nil
118	(Scotland)	Mark McMillan	Scrum half	2003-09-19	Away	Brewery Field	(Wales)	Celtic Warriors	Celtic Cup	Win	Nil
119	(Scotland)	**Dan Parks**	(Fly half)	2003-09-19	Away	Brewery Field	(Wales)	Celtic Warriors	Celtic Cup	Win	Nil
120	(Scotland)	Dave Millard	Wing	2003-09-26	Home	Hughenden Stadium	(Ireland)	Connacht	Celtic League	Loss	Nil
121	(England)	Chris Birchall	(Prop)	2003-11-07	Away	Brewery Field	(Wales)	Celtic Warriors	Celtic League	Loss	Nil
122	(Scotland)	Colin Gregor	(Fly half)	2004-02-06	Away	The Gnoll	(Wales)	Ospreys	Celtic League	Loss	5 pts
123	(South Africa)	Shaun Renwick	(Flanker)	2004-03-05	Home	Hughenden Stadium	(Wales)	Dragons	Celtic League	Win	Nil
124	(Australia)	Mark Sitch	(Lock)	2004-03-26	Home	Hughenden Stadium	(Ireland)	Munster	Celtic League	Loss	Nil
125	(Scotland)	Eric Milligan	(Prop)	2004-05-07	Away	Meadowbank Stadium	(Scotland)	Edinburgh	Celtic League	Loss	Nil
126	(Canada)	**Kevin Tkachuk**	Prop	2004-09-04	Away	Galway Sportsgrounds	(Ireland)	Connacht	Celtic League	Loss	Nil
127	(England)	Scott Barrow	Centre	2004-09-04	Away	Galway Sportsgrounds	(Ireland)	Connacht	Celtic League	Loss	Nil
128	(Scotland)	Dan Turner	(Lock)	2004-09-04	Away	Galway Sportsgrounds	(Ireland)	Connacht	Celtic League	Loss	Nil
129	(Scotland)	**Andy Craig**	(Centre)	2004-09-11	Away	The Greenyards	(Scotland)	Border Reivers	Celtic League	Win	Nil
130	(Scotland)	**Johnnie Beattie**	(Flanker)	2004-09-18	Home	Old Anniesland	(Scotland)	Edinburgh	Celtic League	Win	Nil
131	(Scotland)	Steve Swindall	(Flanker)	2004-10-02	Away	St. Helen's	(Wales)	Ospreys	Celtic League	Loss	Nil
132	(Scotland)	**Rory Lamont**	Full Back	2004-11-05	Home	Hughenden Stadium	(Scotland)	Border Reivers	Celtic League	Win	Nil
133	(Scotland)	**John Barclay**	(Flanker)	2004-11-05	Home	Hughenden Stadium	(Scotland)	Border Reivers	Celtic League	Win	Nil
134	(Scotland)	Colin Shaw	(Full Back)	2004-11-13	Away	Cardiff Arms Park	(Wales)	Cardiff Blues	Celtic League	Loss	Nil
135	(South Africa)	Jonathan van der Schyff	(Lock)	2005-01-22	Away	Rodney Parade	(Wales)	Dragons	Celtic League	Loss	Nil
136	(Scotland)	Alasdhair McFarlane	(Scrum half)	2005-02-20	Away	Thomond Park	(Ireland)	Munster	Celtic League	Loss	Nil
137	(Scotland)	Craig Hamilton	Lock	2005-09-02	Home	Hughenden Stadium	(Wales)	Dragons	Celtic League	Loss	Nil
138	(England)	Mike Roberts	Wing	2005-09-02	Home	Hughenden Stadium	(Wales)	Dragons	Celtic League	Loss	5 pts
139	(Scotland)	Stuart Corsar	(Prop)	2005-09-02	Home	Hughenden Stadium	(Wales)	Dragons	Celtic League	Loss	Nil
140	(England)	Gregor Hayter	(Lock)	2005-09-02	Home	Hughenden Stadium	(Wales)	Dragons	Celtic League	Loss	Nil
141	(Ireland)	Tim Barker	Lock	2005-09-10	Away	Donnybrook Stadium	(Ireland)	Leinster	Celtic League	Loss	Nil
142	(Australia)	Graydon Staniforth	(Wing)	2005-09-17	Home	Hughenden Stadium	(Ireland)	Munster	Celtic League	Win	Nil
143	(Scotland)	Hefin O'Hare	(Wing)	2005-09-24	Home	Hughenden Stadium	(Wales)	Cardiff Blues	Celtic League	Loss	Nil
144	(New Zealand)	Eddie McLaughlin	(Wing)	2005-11-04	Home	Hughenden Stadium	(Ireland)	Connacht	Celtic League	Loss	Nil
145	(Scotland)	**Ben Cairns**	(Centre)	2006-01-27	Home	Old Anniesland	(Wales)	Ospreys	Celtic League	Loss	Nil
146	(England)	Spencer Davey	Centre	2006-02-18	Away	Thomond Park	(Ireland)	Munster	Celtic League	Win	Nil
147	(Scotland)	James Eddie	(Flanker)	2006-02-18	Away	Thomond Park	(Ireland)	Munster	Celtic League	Win	Nil
148	(Scotland)	Iain Kennedy	(Full Back)	2006-05-26	Away	Galway Sportsgrounds	(Ireland)	Connacht	Celtic League	Loss	Nil
149	(Samoa)	**Justin Va'a**	Prop	2006-09-01	Home	Hughenden Stadium	(Wales)	Dragons	Celtic League	Loss	Nil
150	(Scotland)	**Alastair Kellock**	Lock	2006-09-01	Home	Hughenden Stadium	(Wales)	Dragons	Celtic League	Loss	Nil
151	(Wales)	Andy Newman	Lock	2006-09-01	Home	Hughenden Stadium	(Wales)	Dragons	Celtic League	Loss	Nil
152	(Scotland)	**Thom Evans**	Wing	2006-09-01	Home	Hughenden Stadium	(Wales)	Dragons	Celtic League	Loss	Nil
153	(Argentina)	**Francisco Leonelli**	Full Back	2006-09-01	Home	Hughenden Stadium	(Wales)	Dragons	Celtic League	Loss	Nil
154	(England)	Sean Marsden	Centre	2006-09-15	Home	Hughenden Stadium	(Ireland)	Munster	Celtic League	Win	Nil
155	(Scotland)	Calum Forrester	(Flanker)	2006-09-22	Away	Cardiff Arms Park	(Wales)	Cardiff Blues	Celtic League	Win	Nil
156	(Scotland)	**Ruaridh Jackson**	(Fly half)	2006-10-27	Home	Hughenden Stadium	(Italy)	GRAN Parma	European Challenge Cup	Win	2 pts
157	(Scotland)	**Moray Low**	Prop	2006-11-10	Away	Donnybrook Stadium	(Ireland)	Leinster	Celtic League	Loss	Nil
158	(New Zealand)	Michael Collins	Prop	2007-09-21	Away	Cardiff Arms Park	(Wales)	Cardiff Blues	Celtic League	Loss	Nil
159	(Scotland)	**Richie Vernon**	Flanker	2007-09-21	Away	Cardiff Arms Park	(Wales)	Cardiff Blues	Celtic League	Loss	Nil
160	(Australia)	Chris O'Young	Scrum half	2007-09-21	Away	Cardiff Arms Park	(Wales)	Cardiff Blues	Celtic League	Loss	Nil
161	(New Zealand)	**Daryl Gibson**	Centre	2007-09-21	Away	Cardiff Arms Park	(Wales)	Cardiff Blues	Celtic League	Loss	Nil
162	(Scotland)	**Max Evans**	Wing	2007-09-21	Away	Cardiff Arms Park	(Wales)	Cardiff Blues	Celtic League	Loss	Nil
163	(Argentina)	**Bernardo Stortoni**	Full Back	2007-09-21	Away	Cardiff Arms Park	(Wales)	Cardiff Blues	Celtic League	Loss	Nil
164	(Scotland)	**Pat MacArthur**	(Prop)	2007-09-21	Away	Cardiff Arms Park	(Wales)	Cardiff Blues	Celtic League	Loss	Nil
165	(Scotland)	**Ed Kalman**	(Prop)	2007-09-21	Away	Cardiff Arms Park	(Wales)	Cardiff Blues	Celtic League	Loss	Nil
166	(Scotland)	**Kelly Brown**	No. 8	2007-10-26	Home	Firhill Stadium	(Ireland)	Munster	Celtic League	Draw	Nil
167	(Samoa)	**Lome Fa'atau**	Wing	2007-10-26	Home	Firhill Stadium	(Ireland)	Munster	Celtic League	Draw	5 pts
168	(Scotland)	Mike Adamson	(Fly half)	2008-01-04	Home	Firhill Stadium	(Wales)	Dragons	Celtic League	Loss	Nil
169	(Argentina)	**José María Núñez Piossek**	(Wing)	2008-12-07	Away	Recreation Ground	(England)	Bath	European Champions Cup	Loss	Nil
170	(Scotland)	Chris Kinloch	Wing	2009-03-07	Away	Ravenhill Stadium	(Ireland)	Ulster	Celtic League	Loss	Nil
171	(Scotland)	**Richie Gray**	(Lock)	2009-03-07	Away	Ravenhill Stadium	(Ireland)	Ulster	Celtic League	Loss	Nil
172	(Scotland)	**Peter Horne**	(Centre)	2009-03-07	Away	Ravenhill Stadium	(Ireland)	Ulster	Celtic League	Loss	Nil
173	(Scotland)	**Jon Welsh**	Prop	2009-05-10	Away	Liberty Stadium	(Wales)	Ospreys	Celtic League	Loss	Nil
174	(Scotland)	**Peter Murchie**	Centre	2009-09-04	Home	Firhill Stadium	(Ireland)	Munster	Celtic League	Win	Nil
175	(Scotland)	**Rob Dewey**	Wing	2009-09-04	Home	Firhill Stadium	(Ireland)	Munster	Celtic League	Win	Nil
176	(Scotland)	Dave McCall	Centre	2009-09-25	Home	Firhill Stadium	(Wales)	Ospreys	Celtic League	Loss	5 pts
177	(Canada)	**D. T. H. van der Merwe**	(Wing)	2009-10-03	Away	Cardiff City Stadium	(Wales)	Cardiff Blues	Celtic League	Win	Nil
178	(Scotland)	**Alex Dunbar**	Wing	2009-12-04	Away	Ravenhill Stadium	(Ireland)	Ulster	Celtic League	Win	Nil
179	(Scotland)	**Chris Fusaro**	Flanker	2010-02-19	Home	Firhill Stadium	(Wales)	Cardiff Blues	Celtic League	Loss	Nil
180	(Scotland)	Paul Burke	(Flanker)	2010-02-19	Home	Firhill Stadium	(Wales)	Cardiff Blues	Celtic League	Loss	Nil
181	(Scotland)	**Duncan Weir**	(Fly half)	2010-04-23	Home	Firhill Stadium	(Ireland)	Leinster	Celtic League	Win	Nil
182	(Scotland)	**Tom Ryder**	Lock	2010-09-03	Home	Firhill Stadium	(Ireland)	Leinster	Celtic League	Win	Nil
183	(Scotland)	**Ryan Wilson**	Flanker	2010-09-03	Home	Firhill Stadium	(Ireland)	Leinster	Celtic League	Win	Nil
184	(Scotland)	**Henry Pyrgos**	Scrum half	2010-09-03	Home	Firhill Stadium	(Ireland)	Leinster	Celtic League	Win	Nil
185	(Argentina)	**Federico Aramburú**	Wing	2010-09-03	Home	Firhill Stadium	(Ireland)	Leinster	Celtic League	Win	Nil
186	(Scotland)	**Ryan Grant**	(Prop)	2010-09-03	Home	Firhill Stadium	(Ireland)	Leinster	Celtic League	Win	Nil
187	(England)	Aly Muldowney	(Lock)	2010-09-03	Home	Firhill Stadium	(Ireland)	Leinster	Celtic League	Win	Nil
188	(Scotland)	**Rob Harley**	(Flanker)	2010-09-03	Home	Firhill Stadium	(Ireland)	Leinster	Celtic League	Win	Nil
189	(Canada)	**Chauncey O'Toole**	Flanker	2010-09-12	Away	Rodney Parade	(Wales)	Dragons	Celtic League	Loss	Nil
190	(Scotland)	Finlay Gillies	(Hooker)	2011-02-11	Home	Firhill Stadium	(Wales)	Cardiff Blues	Celtic League	Loss	Nil
191	(Scotland)	**Stuart Hogg**	Full Back	2011-02-25	Home	Firhill Stadium	(Wales)	Dragons	Celtic League	Draw	Nil
192	(Scotland)	**Gordon Reid**	(Flanker)	2011-03-05	Away	Liberty Stadium	(Wales)	Ospreys	Celtic League	Loss	Nil
193	(Scotland)	**Mark Bennett**	Centre	2011-05-06	Away	RDS Arena	(Ireland)	Leinster	Celtic League	Loss	Nil
194	(Scotland)	**Michael Cusack**	Prop	2011-09-02	Away	Ravenhill Stadium	(Ireland)	Ulster	Pro12	Loss	Nil
195	(New Zealand)	Troy Nathan	Centre	2011-09-02	Away	Ravenhill Stadium	(Ireland)	Ulster	Pro12	Loss	5 pts
196	(Scotland)	**Tommy Seymour**	Wing	2011-09-02	Away	Ravenhill Stadium	(Ireland)	Ulster	Pro12	Loss	Nil
197	(Scotland)	Nick Campbell	(Lock)	2011-09-02	Away	Ravenhill Stadium	(Ireland)	Ulster	Pro12	Loss	Nil
198	(Wales)	Rory Pitman	(No. 8)	2011-09-02	Away	Ravenhill Stadium	(Ireland)	Ulster	Pro12	Loss	Nil
199	(Scotland)	Scott Wight	(Fly half)	2011-09-09	Home	Firhill Stadium	(Ireland)	Munster	Pro12	Loss	Nil
200	(Netherlands)	**Rob Verbakel**	Lock	2011-10-01	Away	Cardiff City Stadium	(Wales)	Cardiff Blues	Pro12	Win	Nil
201	(Samoa)	**David Lemi**	Wing	2011-11-25	Home	Firhill Stadium	(Ireland)	Ulster	Pro12	Win	Nil
202	(Scotland)	Murray McConnell	(Scrum half)	2012-01-07	Away	Parc y Scarlets	(Wales)	Scarlets	Pro12	Loss	Nil
203	(New Zealand)	**Angus Macdonald**	(Flanker)	2012-09-07	Home	Scotstoun Stadium	(Wales)	Scarlets	Pro12	Loss	Nil
204	(The Bahamas)	**George Hunter**	(Prop)	2012-09-14	Away	Liberty Stadium	(Wales)	Ospreys	Pro12	Win	Nil
205	(Scotland)	**Adam Ashe**	(Flanker)	2012-09-14	Away	Liberty Stadium	(Wales)	Ospreys	Pro12	Win	Nil
206	(Scotland)	**Tim Swinson**	Lock	2012-09-21	Home	Scotstoun Stadium	(Ireland)	Connacht	Pro12	Win	Nil
207	(Scotland)	**Josh Strauss**	No. 8	2012-09-28	Home	Scotstoun Stadium	(Italy)	Zebre	Pro12	Win	Nil
208	(Scotland)	Sean Kennedy	Scrum half	2012-09-28	Home	Scotstoun Stadium	(Italy)	Zebre	Pro12	Win	Nil
209	(Scotland)	**Byron McGuigan**	Centre	2012-09-28	Home	Scotstoun Stadium	(Italy)	Zebre	Pro12	Win	Nil
210	(Scotland)	Fraser Thomson	Full Back	2012-09-28	Home	Scotstoun Stadium	(Italy)	Zebre	Pro12	Win	Nil
211	(Tonga)	**Ofa Faingaʻanuku**	(Prop)	2012-09-28	Home	Scotstoun Stadium	(Italy)	Zebre	Pro12	Win	Nil
212	(Fiji)	**Nikola Matawalu**	(Scrum half)	2012-10-06	Away	Cardiff Arms Park	(Wales)	Cardiff Blues	Pro12	Win	Nil
213	(Canada)	**Taylor Paris**	Wing	2012-11-02	Home	Scotstoun Stadium	(Wales)	Dragons	Pro12	Win	Nil
214	(Argentina)	**German Araoz**	(Prop)	2012-11-02	Home	Scotstoun Stadium	(Wales)	Dragons	Pro12	Win	Nil
215	(Scotland)	**Sean Maitland**	(Wing)	2012-12-07	Home	Scotstoun Stadium	(France)	Castres Olympique	European Champions Cup	Loss	Nil
216	(Scotland)	**Jonny Gray**	(Lock)	2012-12-21	Home	Scotstoun Stadium	(Scotland)	Edinburgh	1872 Cup	Win	Nil
217	(Wales)	Gerwyn Price	Hooker	2013-02-10	Away	Stadio XXV Aprile	(Italy)	Zebre	Pro12	Win	Nil
218	(Scotland)	**Fraser Brown**	(Hooker)	2013-02-10	Away	Stadio XXV Aprile	(Italy)	Zebre	Pro12	Win	Nil
219	(Scotland)	**Finn Russell**	(Fly half)	2013-02-10	Away	Stadio XXV Aprile	(Italy)	Zebre	Pro12	Win	4 pts
220	(Scotland)	Garry Mountford	(Prop)	2013-02-22	Home	Scotstoun Stadium	(Ireland)	Ulster	Pro12	Win	Nil
221	(Fiji)	**Jerry Yanuyanutawa**	Prop	2013-09-06	Home	Scotstoun Stadium	(Wales)	Cardiff Blues	Pro12	Win	Nil
222	(Scotland)	**Tyrone Holmes**	(Flanker)	2013-09-06	Home	Scotstoun Stadium	(Wales)	Cardiff Blues	Pro12	Win	Nil
223	(Argentina)	**Gabriel Ascárate**	(Wing)	2013-09-13	Away	Ravenhill Stadium	(Ireland)	Ulster	Pro12	Win	Nil
224	(Fiji)	**Leone Nakarawa**	(Lock)	2013-11-02	Away	Galway Sportsgrounds	(Ireland)	Connacht	Pro12	Win	Nil
225	(Scotland)	Jack Steele	(Centre)	2013-11-22	Home	Scotstoun Stadium	(Wales)	Dragons	Pro12	Loss	Nil
226	(Scotland)	**Rory Hughes**	Wing	2014-02-09	Home	Scotstoun Stadium	(Ireland)	Connacht	Pro12	Win	Nil
227	(Scotland)	**Lee Jones**	Wing	2014-02-09	Home	Scotstoun Stadium	(Ireland)	Connacht	Pro12	Win	Nil
228	(United States)	**Folau Niua**	(Centre)	2014-02-23	Away	Rodney Parade	(Wales)	Dragons	Pro12	Loss	Nil
229	(Scotland)	**Kevin Bryce**	(Hooker)	2014-02-23	Away	Rodney Parade	(Wales)	Dragons	Pro12	Loss	Nil
230	(Scotland)	**Geoff Cross**	Prop	2014-04-04	Away	Stadio Comunale di Monigo	(Italy)	Benetton Treviso	Pro12	Win	Nil
231	(Scotland)	**Alex Allan**	Prop	2014-09-06	Home	Scotstoun Stadium	(Ireland)	Leinster	Pro12	Win	Nil
232	(South Africa)	Rossouw de Klerk	(Prop)	2014-09-06	Home	Scotstoun Stadium	(Ireland)	Leinster	Pro12	Win	Nil
233	(Ireland)	**James Downey**	(Centre)	2014-09-26	Home	Scotstoun Stadium	(Ireland)	Connacht	Pro12	Win	Nil
234	(Scotland)	**Zander Fagerson**	(Prop)	2014-10-05	Away	Stadio Comunale di Monigo	(Italy)	Benetton Treviso	Pro12	Win	Nil
235	(Scotland)	Will Bordill	(Flanker)	2014-10-31	Home	Scotstoun Stadium	(Italy)	Benetton Treviso	Pro12	Win	Nil
236	(Canada)	**Connor Braid**	(Fly half)	2014-10-31	Home	Scotstoun Stadium	(Italy)	Benetton Treviso	Pro12	Win	Nil
237	(Scotland)	**Ali Price**	(Scrum half)	2014-11-21	Home	Parc y Scarlets	(Wales)	Scarlets	Pro12	Loss	Nil
238	(Scotland)	Glenn Bryce	(Centre)	2014-11-21	Home	Parc y Scarlets	(Wales)	Scarlets	Pro12	Loss	Nil
239	(Scotland)	Fraser Lyle	Centre	2015-02-15	Away	Stadio Sergio Lanfranchi	(Italy)	Zebre	Pro12	Win	Nil
240	(Scotland)	Fraser McKenzie	(Lock)	2015-02-21	Home	Scotstoun Stadium	(Wales)	Ospreys	Pro12	Win	Nil
241	(Scotland)	**D'Arcy Rae**	(Prop)	2015-02-28	Away	Musgrave Park	(Ireland)	Munster	Pro12	Loss	Nil
242	(Australia)	Alex Toolis	(Lock)	2015-02-28	Away	Musgrave Park	(Ireland)	Munster	Pro12	Loss	Nil
243	(Scotland)	Tommy Spinks	(Flanker)	2015-02-28	Away	Musgrave Park	(Ireland)	Munster	Pro12	Loss	Nil
244	(Scotland)	**Scott Cummings**	Lock	2015-09-05	Home	Scotstoun Stadium	(Wales)	Scarlets	Pro12	Loss	Nil
245	(Scotland)	**Grayson Hart**	Scrum half	2015-09-05	Home	Scotstoun Stadium	(Wales)	Scarlets	Pro12	Loss	Nil
246	(Scotland)	Fergus Scott	(Hooker)	2015-09-05	Home	Scotstoun Stadium	(Wales)	Scarlets	Pro12	Loss	Nil
247	(Scotland)	**Kieran Low**	(Lock)	2015-09-05	Home	Scotstoun Stadium	(Wales)	Scarlets	Pro12	Loss	Nil
248	(Scotland)	**Mike Blair**	(Scrum half)	2015-09-05	Home	Scotstoun Stadium	(Wales)	Scarlets	Pro12	Loss	Nil
249	(England)	Rory Clegg	(Fly half)	2015-09-05	Home	Scotstoun Stadium	(Wales)	Scarlets	Pro12	Loss	Nil
250	(Scotland)	Robbie Fergusson	(Centre)	2015-09-05	Home	Scotstoun Stadium	(Wales)	Scarlets	Pro12	Loss	Nil
251	(Scotland)	Junior Bulumakau	Wing	2015-09-11	Home	Scotstoun Stadium	(Ireland)	Connacht	Pro12	Win	Nil
252	(Scotland)	**Hugh Blake**	(Centre)	2015-09-11	Home	Scotstoun Stadium	(Ireland)	Connacht	Pro12	Win	Nil
253	(Scotland)	Gregor Hunter	(Fly half)	2015-10-02	Away	Thomond Park	(Ireland)	Munster	Pro12	Loss	Nil
254	(Australia)	**Taqele Naiyaravoro**	Wing	2015-10-16	Home	Scotstoun Stadium	(Wales)	Dragons	Pro12	Win	Nil
255	(United States)	**Greg Peterson**	(Lock)	2015-10-16	Home	Scotstoun Stadium	(Wales)	Dragons	Pro12	Win	Nil
256	(Italy)	**Simone Favaro**	(Flanker)	2015-10-16	Home	Scotstoun Stadium	(Wales)	Dragons	Pro12	Win	5 pts
257	(Tonga)	**Sila Puafisi**	Prop	2015-11-01	Home	Scotstoun Stadium	(Wales)	Ospreys	Pro12	Win	Nil
258	(Scotland)	**Sam Johnson**	(Centre)	2015-11-01	Home	Scotstoun Stadium	(Wales)	Ospreys	Pro12	Win	Nil
259	(Scotland)	James Malcolm	(Hooker)	2015-11-07	Away	Cardiff Arms Park	(Wales)	Cardiff Blues	Pro12	Win	Nil
260	(Georgia (country))	**Shalva Mamukashvili**	(Prop)	2015-11-21	Home	Scotstoun Stadium	(England)	Northampton Saints	European Champions Cup	Loss	Nil
261	(Scotland)	Cameron Fenton	(Hooker)	2016-02-19	Home	Rugby Park	(Ireland)	Munster	Pro12	Win	Nil
262	(Scotland)	**Nick Grigg**	(Centre)	2016-03-18	Home	Scotstoun Stadium	(Ireland)	Leinster	Pro12	Win	Nil
263	(Italy)	**Leonardo Sarto**	Wing	2016-09-03	Away	Galway Sportsgrounds	(Ireland)	Connacht	Pro12	Win	Nil
264	(Namibia)	**Tjiuee Uanivi**	(Lock)	2016-09-03	Away	Galway Sportsgrounds	(Ireland)	Connacht	Pro12	Win	Nil
265	(Scotland)	Lewis Wynne	(Flanker)	2016-09-03	Away	Galway Sportsgrounds	(Ireland)	Connacht	Pro12	Win	Nil
266	(New Zealand)	**Corey Flynn**	(Hooker)	2016-09-03	Away	Galway Sportsgrounds	(Ireland)	Connacht	Pro12	Win	Nil
267	(Scotland)	Sam Thomson	(Lock)	2016-09-23	Home	Scotstoun Stadium	(Ireland)	Ulster	Pro12	Loss	Nil
268	(Scotland)	**Matt Fagerson**	(No. 8)	2016-09-23	Home	Scotstoun Stadium	(Ireland)	Ulster	Pro12	Loss	Nil
269	(Canada)	**Djustice Sears-Duru**	(Prop)	2016-09-30	Away	Rodney Parade	(Wales)	Dragons	Pro12	Win	Nil
270	(Scotland)	Rob McAlpine	(Lock)	2016-09-30	Away	Rodney Parade	(Wales)	Dragons	Pro12	Win	Nil
271	(Scotland)	Callum Hunter-Hill	(Lock)	2016-10-08	Away	Stadio Sergio Lanfranchi	(Italy)	Zebre	Pro12	Win	Nil
272	(Samoa)	**Brian Alainu'uese**	(Lock)	2016-10-28	Home	Scotstoun Stadium	(Italy)	Benetton Treviso	Pro12	Win	Nil
273	(United States)	**Langilangi Haupeakui**	(Flanker)	2016-10-28	Home	Scotstoun Stadium	(Italy)	Benetton Treviso	Pro12	Win	Nil
274	(Scotland)	**Jamie Bhatti**	(Prop)	2016-11-05	Away	Parc y Scarlets	(Wales)	Scarlets	Pro12	Loss	Nil
275	(Scotland)	Adam Nicol	(Prop)	2016-11-25	Home	Scotstoun Stadium	(Wales)	Ospreys	Pro12	Loss	Nil
276	(Scotland)	**George Horne**	(Scrum half)	2016-11-25	Home	Scotstoun Stadium	(Wales)	Ospreys	Pro12	Loss	Nil
277	(Scotland)	Paddy Kelly	(Centre)	2016-11-25	Home	Scotstoun Stadium	(Wales)	Ospreys	Pro12	Loss	Nil
278	(Fiji)	**Nemia Kenatale**	(Scrum half)	2016-11-25	Away	Stadio Comunale di Monigo	(Italy)	Benetton Treviso	Pro12	Win	Nil
279	(Germany)	**Hagen Schulte**	(Fly half)	2017-02-10	Home	Scotstoun Stadium	(Wales)	Scarlets	Pro12	Loss	Nil
280	(South Africa)	Brandon Thomson	Full Back	2017-02-18	Home	Scotstoun Stadium	(Ireland)	Ulster	Pro12	Loss	7 pts
281	(Scotland)	Matt Smith	Flanker	2017-02-26	Away	Liberty Stadium	(Wales)	Ospreys	Pro12	Loss	Nil
282	(Australia)	Ratu Tagive	(Wing)	2017-02-26	Away	Liberty Stadium	(Wales)	Ospreys	Pro12	Loss	Nil
283	(Scotland)	**George Turner**	Hooker	2017-09-02	Away	Galway Sportsgrounds	(Ireland)	Connacht	Pro14	Win	Nil
284	(New Zealand)	**Lelia Masaga**	Wing	2017-09-02	Away	Galway Sportsgrounds	(Ireland)	Connacht	Pro14	Win	Nil
285	(Scotland)	**Oli Kebble**	(Prop)	2017-09-02	Away	Galway Sportsgrounds	(Ireland)	Connacht	Pro14	Win	Nil
286	(Scotland)	**Adam Hastings**	(Fly half)	2017-09-02	Away	Galway Sportsgrounds	(Ireland)	Connacht	Pro14	Win	Nil
287	(New Zealand)	Callum Gibbins	Flanker	2017-09-09	Home	Scotstoun Stadium	(Wales)	Ospreys	Pro14	Win	Nil
288	(Scotland)	**Stafford McDowall**	(Centre)	2017-10-27	Home	Scotstoun Stadium	(South Africa)	Southern Kings	Pro14	Win	Nil
289	(Scotland)	Kiran McDonald	Lock	2017-11-26	Away	Liberty Stadium	(Wales)	Ospreys	Pro14	Win	Nil
290	(Italy)	**Samuela Vunisa**	No. 8	2017-11-26	Away	Liberty Stadium	(Wales)	Ospreys	Pro14	Win	Nil
291	(Tonga)	**Siua Halanukonuka**	(Prop)	2017-11-26	Away	Liberty Stadium	(Wales)	Ospreys	Pro14	Win	Nil
292	(Scotland)	Hamilton Burr	(Lock)	2017-11-26	Away	Liberty Stadium	(Wales)	Ospreys	Pro14	Win	Nil
293	(Scotland)	Kaleem Barreto	(Scrum half)	2017-11-26	Away	Liberty Stadium	(Wales)	Ospreys	Pro14	Win	Nil
294	(Scotland)	**Huw Jones**	Centre	2017-12-08	Home	Scotstoun Stadium	(France)	Montpellier	European Champions Cup	Loss	Nil
295	(Scotland)	**Grant Stewart**	(Hooker)	2018-01-14	Away	RDS Arena	(Ireland)	Leinster	European Champions Cup	Loss	Nil
296	(Australia)	**Nick Frisby**	(Scrum half)	2018-09-01	Away	Galway Sportsgrounds	(Ireland)	Connacht	Pro14	Win	Nil
297	(Scotland)	Robbie Nairn	(Wing)	2018-09-22	Away	NMU Stadium	(South Africa)	Southern Kings	Pro14	Loss	Nil
298	(Scotland)	Andrew Davidson	(Wing)	2018-09-29	Home	Scotstoun Stadium	(Wales)	Dragons	Pro14	Win	Nil
299	(United States)	**David Tameilau**	(No. 8)	2018-10-05	Home	Scotstoun Stadium	(Italy)	Zebre	Pro14	Win	Nil
300	(South Africa)	Petrus du Plessis	Prop	2017-10-14	Home	Scotstoun Stadium	(England)	Saracens	European Champions Cup	Loss	Nil
301	(Scotland)	Bruce Flockhart	(Flanker)	2018-11-02	Away	Liberty Stadium	(Wales)	Ospreys	Pro14	Win	Nil
302	(Scotland)	Thomas Gordon	(Flanker)	2019-01-25	Home	Scotstoun Stadium	(Wales)	Ospreys	Pro14	Win	Nil
303	(Scotland)	**Robbie Smith**	(Hooker)	2019-01-25	Home	Scotstoun Stadium	(Wales)	Ospreys	Pro14	Win	Nil
304	(Scotland)	**Kyle Steyn**	Wing	2019-02-16	Away	Cardiff Arms Park	(Wales)	Cardiff Blues	Pro14	Win	Nil
305	(Scotland)	**Jamie Dobie**	(Scrum half)	2019-09-27	Away	Free State Stadium	(South Africa)	Cheetahs	Pro14	Loss	Nil
306	(Scotland)	**Johnny Matthews**	(Hooker)	2019-09-27	Away	Free State Stadium	(South Africa)	Cheetahs	Pro14	Loss	Nil
307	(Scotland)	George Thornton	(Prop)	2019-10-12	Home	Scotstoun Stadium	(Wales)	Cardiff Blues	Pro14	Win	Nil
308	(Samoa)	**Aki Seiuli**	(Prop)	2019-11-30	Home	Scotstoun Stadium	(Ireland)	Leinster	Pro14	Loss	Nil
309	(Fiji)	**Mesu Dolokoto**	(Hooker)	2020-02-14	Home	Scotstoun Stadium	(Italy)	Zebre	Pro14	Win	10 pts
310	(Scotland)	Ewan McQuillin	(Prop)	2020-02-14	Home	Scotstoun Stadium	(Wales)	Dragons	Pro14	Win	Nil
311	(Australia)	Dylan Evans	(Prop)	2020-08-22	Home	Murrayfield Stadium	(Scotland)	Edinburgh	1872 Cup	Loss	Nil
312	(England)	Charlie Capps	(Prop)	2020-08-28	Away	Murrayfield Stadium	(Scotland)	Edinburgh	Pro14	Win	Nil
313	(Argentina)	**Enrique Pieretto**	(Prop)	2020-08-28	Away	Murrayfield Stadium	(Scotland)	Edinburgh	Pro14	Win	Nil
314	(Tonga)	**Fotu Lokotui**	(Flanker)	2020-10-03	Away	Galway Sportsgrounds	(Ireland)	Connacht	Pro14	Loss	Nil
315	(Scotland)	Hamish Bain	Lock	2020-10-24	Away	Liberty Stadium	(Wales)	Ospreys	Pro14	Loss	Nil
316	(Samoa)	**TJ Ioane**	No. 8	2020-10-24	Away	Liberty Stadium	(Wales)	Ospreys	Pro14	Loss	Nil
317	(England)	Lewis Bean	(Lock)	2020-11-09	Away	Ravenhill Stadium	(Ireland)	Ulster	Pro14	Loss	Nil
318	(Netherlands)	**Caleb Korteweg**	(Scrum half)	2020-11-09	Away	Ravenhill Stadium	(Ireland)	Ulster	Pro14	Loss	Nil
319	(Scotland)	**Ross Thompson**	(Fly half)	2021-01-02	Away	Murrayfield Stadium	(Scotland)	Edinburgh	1872 Cup	Loss	2 pts
320	(Scotland)	**Rufus McLean**	Wing	2021-01-16	Home	Scotstoun Stadium	(Scotland)	Edinburgh	1872 Cup	Win	Nil
321	(Scotland)	**Ollie Smith**	(Wing)	2021-01-16	Home	Scotstoun Stadium	(Scotland)	Edinburgh	1872 Cup	Win	Nil
322	(England)	James Scott	(Lock)	2021-02-19	Home	Scotstoun Stadium	(Ireland)	Ulster	Pro14	Loss	Nil
323	(New Zealand)	Cole Forbes	Wing	2021-02-28	Away	RDS Arena	(Ireland)	Leinster	Pro14	Loss	Nil
324	(Scotland)	**Gregor Brown**	(Flanker)	2021-02-28	Away	RDS Arena	(Ireland)	Leinster	Pro14	Loss	Nil
325	(Ireland)	**Ian Keatley**	(Fly half)	2021-03-06	Away	Stadio Sergio Lanfranchi	(Italy)	Zebre	Pro14	Win	6 pts
326	(Croatia)	**Jordan Lenac**	(Scrum half)	2021-03-27	Home	Scotstoun Stadium	(Italy)	Benetton Treviso	Pro14	Win	Nil
327	(Australia)	Tom Lambert	(Prop)	2021-04-24	Away	Stadio Comunale di Monigo	(Italy)	Benetton Treviso	Rainbow Cup	Loss	Nil
328	(Scotland)	**Rory Darge**	(Flanker)	2021-04-24	Away	Stadio Comunale di Monigo	(Italy)	Benetton Treviso	Rainbow Cup	Loss	Nil
329	(Wales)	Brad Thyer	Prop	2021-09-24	Away	Ravenhill Stadium	(Ireland)	Ulster	United Rugby Championship	Loss	Nil
330	(Scotland)	**Simon Berghan**	Prop	2021-09-24	Away	Ravenhill Stadium	(Ireland)	Ulster	United Rugby Championship	Loss	Nil
331	(Scotland)	**Jack Dempsey**	No. 8	2021-09-24	Away	Ravenhill Stadium	(Ireland)	Ulster	United Rugby Championship	Loss	Nil
332	(Scotland)	**Sione Tuipulotu**	Centre	2021-09-24	Away	Ravenhill Stadium	(Ireland)	Ulster	United Rugby Championship	Loss	Nil
333	(Scotland)	**Murray McCallum**	(Prop)	2021-09-24	Away	Ravenhill Stadium	(Ireland)	Ulster	United Rugby Championship	Loss	Nil
334	(Scotland)	**Murphy Walker**	(Prop)	2021-10-02	Home	Scotstoun Stadium	(South Africa)	Sharks	United Rugby Championship	Win	Nil
335	(Scotland)	Ally Miller	(Flanker)	2021-10-02	Home	Scotstoun Stadium	(South Africa)	Sharks	United Rugby Championship	Win	Nil
336	(Argentina)	**Sebastián Cancelliere**	Wing	2021-10-16	Away	Stadio Sergio Lanfranchi	(Italy)	Zebre	United Rugby Championship	Win	Nil
337	(Scotland)	**Nathan McBeth**	(Prop)	2021-11-27	Away	Stadio Comunale di Monigo	(Italy)	Benetton Treviso	United Rugby Championship	Loss	Nil
338	(New Zealand)	Josh McKay	Full Back	2021-12-04	Home	Scotstoun Stadium	(Wales)	Dragons	United Rugby Championship	Win	Nil
339	(Argentina)	**Domingo Miotti**	(Fly-half)	2021-12-04	Home	Scotstoun Stadium	(Wales)	Dragons	United Rugby Championship	Win	Nil
340	(Tonga)	**Walter Fifita**	(Wing)	2022-01-08	Home	Scotstoun Stadium	(Wales)	Ospreys	United Rugby Championship	Win	Nil
341	(Argentina)	**Lucio Sordoni**	Prop	2022-09-16	Away	Stadio Comunale di Monigo	(Italy)	Benetton Treviso	United Rugby Championship	Loss	Nil
342	(South Africa)	Sintu Manjezi	Flanker	2022-09-16	Away	Stadio Comunale di Monigo	(Italy)	Benetton Treviso	United Rugby Championship	Loss	Nil
343	(Scotland)	**Tom Jordan**	Fly half	2022-09-16	Away	Stadio Comunale di Monigo	(Italy)	Benetton Treviso	United Rugby Championship	Loss	Nil
344	(South Africa)	JP du Preez	(Lock)	2022-09-23	Home	Scotstoun Stadium	(Wales)	Cardiff Rugby	United Rugby Championship	Win	Nil
345	(Tonga)	**Sione Vailanu**	(Flanker)	2022-10-15	Away	Kings Park Stadium	(South Africa)	Sharks	United Rugby Championship	Loss	Nil
346	(Scotland)	**Alex Samuel**	Lock	2022-10-28	Home	Scotstoun Stadium	(Italy)	Benetton Treviso	United Rugby Championship	Win	Nil
347	(Scotland)	Euan Ferrie	(Flanker)	2021-10-28	Home	Scotstoun Stadium	(Italy)	Benetton Treviso	United Rugby Championship	Win	Nil
348	(England)	Cameron Neild	Flanker	2021-12-10	Away	Recreation Ground	(England)	Bath	European Challenge Cup	Win	Nil
349	(Scotland)	Jack Mann	No. 8	2021-12-10	Away	Recreation Ground	(England)	Bath	European Challenge Cup	Win	Nil
350	(Scotland)	Angus Fraser	(Hooker)	2021-12-10	Away	Recreation Ground	(England)	Bath	European Challenge Cup	Win	Nil
351	(England)	Eli Caven	Wing	2023-02-25	Away	Ellis Park Stadium	(South Africa)	Lions	United Rugby Championship	Loss	5pts
352	(Scotland)	**Allan Dell**	(Prop)	2023-02-25	Away	Ellis Park Stadium	(South Africa)	Lions	United Rugby Championship	Loss	Nil
353	(South Africa)	Henco Venter	Flanker	2023-10-21	Home	Scotstoun Stadium	(Ireland)	Leinster	United Rugby Championship	Win	Nil
354	(Scotland)	**Kyle Rowe**	Wing	2023-10-28	Away	Galway Sportsgrounds	(Ireland)	Connacht	United Rugby Championship	Loss	5 pts
355	(Scotland)	**Max Williamson**	(Lock)	2023-11-18	Home	Scotstoun Stadium	(Italy)	Benetton Treviso	United Rugby Championship	Win	Nil
356	(Scotland)	Ben Afshar	(Scrum Half)	2023-11-25	Home	Scotstoun Stadium	(Ireland)	Ulster	United Rugby Championship	Win	Nil
357	(Scotland)	Gregor Hiddleston	Hooker	2024-01-13	Away	Sandy Park	(England)	Exeter Chiefs	European Champions Cup	Loss	Nil
358	(Argentina)	**Facundo Cordero**	Wing	2024-02-17	Home	Scotstoun Stadium	(Wales)	Dragons	United Rugby Championship	Win	5pts
359	(Scotland)	Ruaraidh Hart	(Flanker)	2024-02-17	Home	Scotstoun Stadium	(Wales)	Dragons	United Rugby Championship	Win	Nil
360	(Scotland)	Duncan Munn	(Centre)	2024-03-22	Home	Scotstoun Stadium	(Wales)	Cardiff Rugby	United Rugby Championship	Win	Nil
361	(Australia)	**Sam Talakai**	Prop	2024-09-21	Away	Kingspan Stadium	(Ireland)	Ulster Rugby	United Rugby Championship	Loss	Nil
362	(Scotland)	**Rory Sutherland**	Prop	2024-09-27	Home	Scotstoun Stadium	(Italy)	Benetton Rugby	United Rugby Championship	Win	Nil
363	(Namibia)	Patrick Schickerling	(Prop)	2024-10-04	Away	Cardiff Arms Park	(Wales)	Cardiff Rugby	United Rugby Championship	Win	Nil
364	(Scotland)	**Fin Richardson**	Prop	2024-11-29	Home	Scotstoun Stadium	(Wales)	Scarlets	United Rugby Championship	Win	Nil
365	(Scotland)	Jare Oguntibeju	Lock	2024-11-29	Home	Scotstoun Stadium	(Wales)	Scarlets	United Rugby Championship	Win	Nil
366	(Scotland)	Kerr Johnston	(Wing)	2025-02-16	Away	Rodney Parade	(Wales)	Dragons	United Rugby Championship	Win	Nil
367	(Scotland)	Macenzzie Duncan	(No. 8)	2025-02-16	Away	Rodney Parade	(Wales)	Dragons	United Rugby Championship	Win	Nil
368	(Scotland)	Seb Stephen	Hooker	2025-05-17	Away	Aviva Stadium	(Ireland)	Leinster	United Rugby Championship	Loss	Nil
369	(Scotland)	Dan Lancaster	Fly Half	2025-09-26	Home	Scotstoun Stadium	(South Africa)	Sharks	United Rugby Championship	Win	Nil
370	(Scotland)	Kerr Yule	Centre	2025-09-26	Home	Scotstoun Stadium	(South Africa)	Sharks	United Rugby Championship	Win	Nil
371	(Scotland)	**Alex Craig**	Lock	2025-10-11	Home	Scotstoun Stadium	(Wales)	Dragons	United Rugby Championship	Win	Nil
372	(Scotland)	Jack Oliver	(Scrum Half)	2026-01-03	Home	Scotstoun Stadium	(Italy)	Zebre	United Rugby Championship	Win	Nil
373	(Scotland)	Dylan Cockburn	(Lock)	2026-01-30	Home	Scotstoun Stadium	(Ireland)	Munster	United Rugby Championship	Win	Nil
374	(Scotland)	Matthew Urwin	(Fly Half)	2026-01-30	Home	Scotstoun Stadium	(Ireland)	Munster	United Rugby Championship	Win	Nil
375	(Scotland)	Johnny Ventisei	Centre	2026-03-21	Home	Scotstoun Stadium	(Ireland)	Leinster	United Rugby Championship	Win	Nil
376	(Scotland)	Fergus Watson	Wing	2026-03-27	Home	Scotstoun Stadium	(Italy)	Benetton	United Rugby Championship	Win	5 pts
377	(Scotland)	Ryan Burke	(Lock)	2026-04-18	Away	Ellis Park Stadium	(South Africa)	Lions	United Rugby Championship	Loss	Nil
378	(Australia)	Bayley Kuenzle	(Centre)	2026-09-26	Away	Thomond Park	(Ireland)	Munster	United Rugby Championship	Win	Nil
379	(Scotland)	Callum Reidy	(Scrum Half)	2026-10-09	Home	Scotstoun Stadium	(Ireland)	Connacht	United Rugby Championship	Win	Nil
380	(South Africa)	Ruwald van der Merwe	No. 8	2026-10-17	Away	CorpAcq Stadium	(England)	Sale Sharks	European Champions Cup	Win	Nil
381	(Australia)	Tavi Tuipulotu	(Hooker)	2026-10-17	Away	CorpAcq Stadium	(England)	Sale Sharks	European Champions Cup	Win	5 pts
382	(Scotland)	**Jamie Ritchie**	Flanker	2026-10-24	Away	Stadio Comunale di Monigo	(Italy)	Benetton Treviso	United Rugby Championship	Win	Nil
383	(Scotland)	Jake Shearer	Prop	2026-10-30	Home	Scotstoun Stadium	(South Africa)	Lions	United Rugby Championship	Win	Nil
384	(England)	**Jack Singleton**	Hooker	2026-10-30	Home	Scotstoun Stadium	(South Africa)	Lions	United Rugby Championship	Win	5 pts
