= Alan Perrie =

Scottish rugby union player

- Born: Alan Perrie; 27 May 1963 (age 63) Larkhall, Scotland
- Height: 5 ft 10 in (1.78 m)
- Weight: 104 kg (16 st 5 lb)

Rugby union career
- Position: Loosehead Prop
Amateur team(s)
Years	Team	Apps	(Points)
1980-91	Dalziel		
1991-97	Glasgow Academicals		
1997	Glasgow Hawks		
–	Glasgow Academicals		
Senior career
Years	Team	Apps	(Points)
1996-97	Glasgow Warriors	5	(0)
- Correct as of 17 July 2015

Alan Perrie (born 27 May 1963 in Larkhall, Scotland), is a Scottish former rugby union player for Glasgow Warriors at the Loosehead Prop position.

== Rugby Union career ==
=== Amateur career ===
Perrie started playing amateur rugby with Dalziel Rugby Club from 1980 to 1991. He had 155 appearances for the club scoring 20 tries and 80 points. In season 1987–88 Dalziel won the Glasgow Cup for the first time with Perrie played scoring a try in the final against Clarkston. The result: Dalziel 18 Clarkston 7.

He then moved to Glasgow Academicals.

On Accies merger with Glasgow High Kelvinside to form Glasgow Hawks in 1997 Perrie then played for the Hawks.

A bust-up in the Hawks match against Edinburgh Academicals saw Perrie punch Edinburgh Academicals Centre Craig Murray. The punch left Murray permanently scarred and the case ended up in Edinburgh Sheriff Court. Perrie was made to pay a £1500 compensation order to Murray. Edinburgh Accies reported the case to the SRU. Perrie was handed a 26-week ban by the SRU for foul play. This effectively ended Perrie's professional rugby career.

Once the ban was over Perrie resumed his amateur rugby career. He continued to play for Glasgow Hawks.

Perrie then left the Hawks to rejoin Glasgow Academicals, the club surviving the Glasgow Hawks merger in some form as an offshoot. This meant that Glasgow Accies were placed at the bottom of the Scottish league structure. In 2004 the Glasgow Academicals got to the final of the BT Shield

In 2009 the Accies won the Gilmour Cup match against their derby rivals - and likewise merger lower league offshoot- Glasgow High Kelvinside. The Gilmour Cup is an annual memorial match between Glasgow Academicals and Glasgow High Kelvinside. 2009 was the veteran Alan Perrie's last season playing for the club.

=== Professional career ===
Perrie was to play for the provincial Glasgow side on their move from amateur to professional in 1996. The Glasgow Rugby side, now Glasgow Warriors, used Perrie in every match in their European campaign of 1996–97. The prop played in all five of the European Conference matches - now European Challenge Cup - for Glasgow. Unfortunately for Glasgow, they only won the first match of the pool stage and they crashed out of the tournament.

When not involved with Glasgow Warriors Perrie played for his amateur club.

As the Loosehead Prop named for Warriors first match as a professional team - against Newbridge in the European Challenge Cup - Perrie has the distinction of being given Glasgow Warrior No. 1 for the provincial side.
