= John MacLeod (rugby union) =

Scottish rugby union player

- Born: John MacLeod; 20 February 1973 (age 53) Scotland
- Height: 178 cm (5 ft 10 in)
- Weight: 79 kg (12 st 6 lb)

Rugby union career
- Position: Fly-half
Amateur team(s)
Years	Team	Apps	(Points)
- Glasgow High Kelvinside
–	Glasgow Hawks		
–	Glasgow High Kelvinside		
Senior career
Years	Team	Apps	(Points)
1996-97	Glasgow Warriors	3	(0)
Provincial / State sides
Years	Team	Apps	(Points)
1995-96	Glasgow District	1	(0)

John MacLeod (born 20 February 1973) is a former rugby union player Born in Scotland, he played for the professional Glasgow provincial side now called Glasgow Warriors - in the 1996-97 season; the first season of professionalism in Scottish rugby union. MacLeod played at the Fly-half position.

MacLeod played at amateur level for Glasgow High Kelvinside; and was called up for the amateur Glasgow District side only once before the province turned professional. In the 1995-96 season he was picked to play for Glasgow District against North & Midlands. Glasgow lost this game 13-21 and thus they did not qualify for the 1996-97 season's Scottish Heineken Cup places.

The GHK fly-half was to play in three of Glasgow's five games in the European Conference of 1996-97 season, now the European Challenge Cup. He replaced Calum MacGregor who was dropped.

First up for him was a match against Sale Sharks at Glasgow's Hughenden Stadium. Glasgow was convincingly beaten by 29 points to 9. A few days later the second match was played; a real away drubbing against AS Montferrand - now Clermont - ensued, with Montferrand running out 76-9 winners. Finally an away match against Newport RFC ended up with Newport winning 25-10.

After these defeats MacLeod himself was dropped in favour of Andrew Garry at fly-half for the final match against Agen, at Hughenden. However Glasgow lost this home match too. Glasgow ended up fourth in their pool and did not qualify for the next round.

MacLeod was to fare better in the Glasgow High Kelvinside - Glasgow Academicals derby match in October 1996 when GHK outplayed Accies in a resounding win; MacLeod scoring a penalty and conversion in the game.

When GHK and Accies merged in 1997, MacLeod played for the newly merged team Glasgow Hawks. Both GHK and Accies survived the merger as lower league teams and in 2002 MacLeod was back playing for Glasgow High Kelvinside.
