= Stephen Begley =

Scottish rugby union player

- Born: Stephen Begley; 4 April 1975 Chatham, England
- Died: 10 September 2017 (aged 42) Bukit Merah, Singapore
- Height: 6 ft 4 in (1.93 m)
- Weight: 110 kg (17 st 5 lb)

Rugby union career
- Position: Lock
Amateur team(s)
Years	Team	Apps	(Points)
- Glasgow Academicals
–	Glasgow Hawks		
–	Old Belvedere		
–	RC Strasbourg		
–	Watsonians		
–	Glasgow Academicals		
–	Glasgow Hawks		
–	Hamilton Sea Point		
Senior career
Years	Team	Apps	(Points)
1996–98	Glasgow Warriors	9	(0)
–	Lyon		
–	Brive		
Provincial / State sides
Years	Team	Apps	(Points)
- Glasgow District
-	Scottish Exiles		
International career
Years	Team	Apps	(Points)
- Scotland U19
–	Scotland U21		

Stephen Begley (4 April 1975 − 10 September 2017) was a Scottish rugby union player who played for Glasgow Warriors and Glasgow Hawks at the Lock position.

== Rugby union career ==
=== Amateur career ===
Beglay was born in Chatham, Kent, England and grew up in the Isle of Sheppey. He had a grandmother from Gourock.

Begley played for the amateur club Glasgow Academicals. When the Accies merged with Glasgow High Kelvinside to form the Glasgow Hawks in 1997, he then played for the Glasgow Hawks.

For a short spell, Begley played for Old Belvedere RFC in Dublin, Ireland.

After moving back from France, Begley played for Watsonians before moving back to Hawks.

Begley was back with the Glasgow Hawks in 2003 via a short spell back at Glasgow Academicals. His try for the Hawks clinched the BT Premiership title for them in 2004 against Heriots. Hawks became the first ever west of Scotland team to win the Scottish title, in 30 years of effort. Heriots had approached Begley to play for them in 1996. The next year 2005 Hawks almost wrapped up the title against Heriots at Goldenacre with Begley again scoring a try. The 2006 title was almost made certain at Currie.

Begley left Glasgow Hawks in 2006.

=== Provincial and professional career ===
Begley played in the amateur Glasgow District side at Under 21 grade. He played several times for the professional side Glasgow in Europe. As the Lock named for Warriors first match as a professional team - against Newbridge in the European Challenge Cup - Begley has the distinction of being given Glasgow Warrior No. 4 for the provincial side.

Begley played rugby in London and Cape Town. The Cape Town side was Hamilton RFC, Sea Point. Begley played for them in the nineties and then turned out for them as a guest player when Hamilton, Sea Point entered a Sevens team in the Melrose Sevens in 2011. Begley turned out for them in the precursor Veterans Tens tournament which then the Cape Town side went on to win. Begley was selected for the Scottish Exiles District team.

He played for the French rugby clubs Lyon, RC Strasbourg and Brive.

=== International career ===
He played for the Scotland Under 19s and Scotland Under 21s and hoped for a call up to Scotland A.

== Death ==
Begley died while competing in Singapore International Triathlon at East Coast Park on 10 September 2017. A medical team on shore gave CPR but it was to be in vain as Begley was pronounced dead at Singapore General Hospital.
