= Danny Porte =

English rugby union player

- Born: Danny Porte; 18 June 1975 (age 51) England
- Height: 6 ft 1 in (1.85 m)
- Weight: 115 kg (18 st 2 lb)
- School: Dover Grammar School for Boys
- University: Exeter University

Rugby union career
- Position: Tighthead Prop
Amateur team(s)
Years	Team	Apps	(Points)
- Glasgow Academicals
–	Glasgow Hawks		
–	Watsonians RFC		
–	Waterloo		
–	Launceston		
–	Plymouth Albion		
–	Newton Abbot		
Senior career
Years	Team	Apps	(Points)
1996-98	Glasgow Warriors	1	(0)
–	Exeter Chiefs		
International career
Years	Team	Apps	(Points)
- Barbarians

Danny Porte (born 18 June 1975 in England) is an English former rugby union player who played for Glasgow Warriors at the Tighthead Prop position. Porte began playing rugby with the 1st XV for Dover Grammar School for Boys where he excelled in sports.

== Career Debut with Glasgow Warriors ==
Porte began his professional career with Glasgow Warriors in 1996. He was on the bench for Glasgow's European Conference match against Montferrand on 19 October 1996 as well as for Glasgow's game against Newport RFC on 28 October 1996. He came off the bench for Glasgow in their Heineken Cup home match against London Wasps during the Season 1997–98. At the time, Porte was also playing for amateur side Glasgow Academicals before they merged with Glasgow High Kelvinside to form Glasgow Hawks. In 1998, he joined Watsonians RFC. and then played for Waterloo in 2000 before seeking to transition to a career in teaching.

== Exeter University and Teacher Training ==
With a Sports scholarship, Porte attended Exeter University between 2000 and 2004 as a mature student studying for a 4-year degree in Physical Education, Exercise and Sports Science with a Postgraduate Certificate in Education (PGCE). Porte naturally played rugby at university and was in the winning team in the British University Sports Association final against Northumbria University at Twickenham. At Exeter, he also played for Exeter Chiefs gaining over 100 caps for the club. In 2004, after graduating, Porte initially registered as a teacher with Devon County Council but secured appointments overseas in the Cayman Islands, in 2006, and, later, in France.

== Launceston, Plymouth Albion, Barbarians and Newton Abbot ==
Despite a change to teaching, Porte pursued his rugby career. In 2008, he played for Launceston but was released by them in January 2009. He joined Plymouth Albion in January 2009. He also played for the Barbarians in 2009 against a Combined Services team and for Newton Abbot in 2011.

== Moving to New Zealand ==
In Summer 2013, Porte left Newton Abbot RFC and moved permanently to New Zealand. where he is now a full-time PE teacher and sports coach at Christchurch Boys' High School, an independent school.
