= Calum MacGregor =

Scottish rugby union player

- Born: Calum MacGregor; 11 January 1962 (age 64) Scotland
- Height: 183 cm (6 ft 0 in)
- Weight: 80 kg (12 st 8 lb)

Rugby union career
- Position: Fly-half
Amateur team(s)
Years	Team	Apps	(Points)
1979-1983	Glasgow Academicals		
1983-84	Gordonians RFC		
1985-88	Boroughmuir RFC		
1988-1997	Glasgow Academicals		
Senior career
Years	Team	Apps	(Points)
1996-97	Glasgow Warriors	4	(34)
Provincial / State sides
Years	Team	Apps	(Points)
- Glasgow District

Calum MacGregor (born 11 January 1962) is a former rugby union player and is now a director at Kettle Produce. Born in Scotland, he played for the Glasgow District side, and after professionalism was sanctioned in rugby played for Glasgow, now named the Glasgow Warriors.

== Rugby union career ==
=== Amateur career ===
MacGregor started his rugby career with Glasgow Academicals but moved to Aberdeen in 1983 for work. He then played for Gordonians RFC for a year before commuting to Boroughmuir RFC for three years. He then moved again and returned to Glasgow Academicals. In a derby match against Glasgow High Kelvinside in 1989 he scored 17 points in a 21-13 win for the Academicals. By 1995, the side were playing in Division 3, but MacGregor was still scoring points for the club, and was still being selected for Glasgow District.

=== Provincial and professional career ===
MacGregor regularly played District rugby but then had a gap of five years when he was not selected, only to be recalled in 1993 by Glasgow District in 1993 for a match against Munster. He also played in Glasgow's victory over Connacht in 1995.

When the district side turned professional in 1996, MacGregor turned out for the fledgling Glasgow Warriors. As the fly half named for Warriors first match as a professional team - against Newbridge in the European Challenge Cup - MacGregor has the distinction of being given Glasgow Warrior No. 10 for the provincial side.

He was Glasgow's top points scorer in competitive games for the season 1996-97 scoring 34 points. He also played in European competition for the club in the 1996-97 Challenge Cup, where he turned out against Welsh side Newbridge RFC and scored six conversions in the game; the 62-38 victory for Glasgow was their only European win that season. MacGregor was dropped for the following European match against Sale Sharks, but did play in all three Scottish Inter-District Championship matches in 1996-97. The team's second place qualified Glasgow for the Heineken Cup the next season.

After playing professionally for Glasgow Warriors in their first season, MacGregor retired from rugby in 1997. He gave a tribute to his Glasgow coach Kevin Greene: "Kevin Greene, the Glasgow coach, is the kind of man who makes the players think for themselves, like Ian McGeechan, and I prefer that to the blood-and-thunder approach. I have enjoyed playing for Glasgow this year more than any other. I look around at the young guys in the team and they are keen and excited and that makes me feel good about the game. The players have a belief in it and a desire to win and I like that."

== Business career ==
Whilst playing rugby he worked for Wiseman Dairies and remained there when his rugby career ended. In 2005 he joined Wiseman's board as their Quality Director.
