= George Breckenridge =

Scottish rugby union player & coach

- Born: George Breckenridge; 5 September 1964 (age 62) Scotland
- Height: 183 cm (6 ft 0 in)
- Weight: 80 kg (12 st 8 lb)
- School: High School of Glasgow

Rugby union career
- Position: Fly-half
–	Glasgow High Kelvinside		
–	Glasgow Hawks		
Senior career
Years	Team	Apps	(Points)
1996-97	Glasgow Warriors	3	(18)
Provincial / State sides
Years	Team	Apps	(Points)
-	Glasgow District		
1999-2006	Scotland B		
–	Scotland A		
Coaching career
- Years: Team
- Ayr RFC
- Scotland U18
- 2005: Murrayfield Wanderers RFC
- Heriot's Rugby Club (Backs Coach)
- 2006: Scotland Club XV (Asst. Coach)
- 2009: West of Scotland
- –: Lenzie RFC

George Breckenridge (born 5 September 1964) is a former Scottish rugby union player and now coach. He played for the amateur Glasgow District side before playing for the professional Glasgow side, now Glasgow Warriors.

== Rugby Union career ==
=== Amateur career ===
A former student of the High School of Glasgow, Breckenridge played for Glasgow High Kelvinside for 8 years. When they merged with Glasgow Academicals RFC to form Glasgow Hawks he played another two years with the Hawks.

=== Provincial and professional career ===
He became a mainstay in the Glasgow District side. He played in Glasgow District's famous 1989-90 side which won the Scottish Inter-District Championship outright and remained unbeaten the entire season, beating the touring Fiji national rugby union team into the bargain. He played in all their matches that season. Glasgow Warriors later honoured the 20th anniversary of that season when they played Munster in 2009 in the Magners League opener.

When the district side turned professional in 1996, Breckenridge also turned out for the fledgling Glasgow Warriors side. He was Glasgow's top kicker in European Competition for the season 1996-97 scoring 18 points; 3 penalties a-piece in games against Sale Sharks and Clermont (then as Montferrand).

As the replacement wing named for Warriors first match as a professional team - against Newbridge in the European Challenge Cup - Breckenridge has the distinction of being given Glasgow Warrior No. 17 for the provincial side.

He also played rugby in France and New Zealand.

=== International career ===
He was capped by Scotland 'A' and Scotland 'B'. It was felt by some that he was overlooked for a senior Scotland cap as Glasgow District - even as Scottish champions - were viewed as somewhat unfashionable by the SRU.

=== Coaching career ===
He coached Ayr RFC to 2004 and - along with Shade Munro - coached an amateur Glasgow District side in 2001. He also coached the Scotland national under-18 rugby union team and Murrayfield Wanderers RFC in 2005.

He became a Backs Coach at Heriots and in 2006-7 was Assistant Coach to the Scotland Club XV side.

He also coached West of Scotland and now coaches Lenzie RFC

He is a keen supporter of the District system and would like to see it again expanded beyond Glasgow Warriors and Edinburgh Rugby. He coached a Co-Optimists side containing Glasgow Warriors stars Carlin Isles and Folau Niua in a charity match against Caledonia Reds in 2011. He stated: "Having played for Glasgow, I know what a great honour it is to pull on that jersey."

== Outside of rugby ==
He also works for the sports clothing company Canterbury in Glasgow.
