= Harry Bassi =

Scottish rugby union player

- Born: Harvinder Bassi; 26 November 1969 (age 56)
- Height: 5 ft 10 in (1.78 m)
- Weight: 13 st 7 lb (86 kg)
- School: Kelvinside Academy
- Occupation: Rugby player

Rugby union career
- Position: Centre / Fullback
Amateur team(s)
Years	Team	Apps	(Points)
- Glasgow High Kelvinside
–	Glasgow Hawks		
Senior career
Years	Team	Apps	(Points)
1996–97	Glasgow	2	(0)
Provincial / State sides
Years	Team	Apps	(Points)
- Glasgow District
- Correct as of 28 February 2015

Harry Bassi (born 26 November 1969) is a former Scottish rugby union player, normally playing at Centre or Fullback.

== Rugby Union career ==
=== Amateur career ===
At the amateur level Bassi played for Glasgow High Kelvinside. After GHK merged with Glasgow Academicals to form Glasgow Hawks Bassi continued to play for the Hawks team.

=== Provincial and professional career ===
His career spanned the amateur era and the professional era, and Bassi represented Glasgow District at various levels before finally representing the professional Glasgow side, now Glasgow Warriors.

He represented Glasgow District's Schools while attending Kelvinside Academy.

He was selected for the Under-21 Glasgow District side.

At the professional level, Harry Bassi played for Glasgow twice against European opposition in the 1996-97 season. In the European Conference - now the European Challenge Cup - he played for Glasgow away against Newbridge RFC in a 62 - 38 victory; and he played for Glasgow at home against Sale Sharks in a 9-29 defeat.

As the Centre named for Warriors first match as a professional team - against Newbridge in the European Challenge Cup - Bassi has the distinction of being given Glasgow Warrior No. 12 for the provincial side.
