= David McVey =

Scottish rugby union player

- Born: David McVey
- Height: 6 ft 2 in (1.88 m)
- Weight: 95 kg (14 st 13 lb)

Rugby union career
- Position: Number Eight
Amateur team(s)
Years	Team	Apps	(Points)
-	Greenock Wanderers		
–	Ayr RFC		
–	Stirling County RFC		
–	West of Scotland		
–	Greenock Wanderers		
Senior career
Years	Team	Apps	(Points)
1996-97	Glasgow Warriors	1	(0)
Provincial / State sides
Years	Team	Apps	(Points)
-	Glasgow District		
Coaching career
- Years: Team
- -: Greenock Wanderers (First XV coach)
- –: Bute Rugby Club

David McVey (born c. 1966) is a former Scottish rugby union player who played for Glasgow Rugby, now Glasgow Warriors at the number 8 position.

== Rugby union career ==
=== Amateur career ===
At amateur level, McVey played for Greenock Wanderers, Ayr RFC, Stirling County and West of Scotland.

=== Professional and provincial career ===
Before playing for the professional Glasgow Warriors side, McVey frequently represented the amateur provincial Glasgow District side.

He was one of the famous players who played in Glasgow's unbeaten season of 1989-90. He played 5 out of 6 district matches that season and won that year's Scottish Inter-District Championship.

The veteran loose forward was in Glasgow's squad for their first season as a professional club in 1996-97.

He was on the bench for Glasgow's European Conference match away to Newport RFC on 26 October 1996. He came on as a temporary replacement to David McLeish in that match.

He was also named on the bench for Glasgow's next European match against Agen on 30 October 1996. He did not, however, play in that match.

=== Coaching career ===
He was the First Team Coach of Greenock Wanderers. but is now the head coach of Bute Rugby Club.

== Outside of rugby ==
McVey works as a gardener at Mount Stuart and breeds poultry as a hobby.
