= Craig Sangster =

Scottish rugby union player (born 1975)

- Born: Craig Sangster; 2 March 1975 (age 51) Scotland
- Height: 6 ft 0 in (1.83 m)
- Weight: 104 kg (16 st 5 lb)

Rugby union career
- Position: Full Back / Centre
Amateur team(s)
Years	Team	Apps	(Points)
- Stirling County
–	Stirling County		
–	Hamilton RFC		
–	Falkirk RFC		
–	Grangemouth Stags		
–	Bannockburn RFC		
Senior career
Years	Team	Apps	(Points)
1996-98	Glasgow Warriors	18	(5)
- Blackheath
2000-01	Glasgow Warriors	0	(0)
Provincial / State sides
Years	Team	Apps	(Points)
- Glasgow District
-	Caledonia Reds		
International career
Years	Team	Apps	(Points)
- Scotland Students
–	Scotland U21		
Coaching career
- Years: Team
- Grangemouth Stags

Craig Sangster (born 2 March 1975 in Scotland), is a Scottish former rugby union player for Glasgow Warriors at the Full Back or Centre position. Rarely he filled in at Fly-half.

== Rugby Union career ==
=== Amateur career ===
Sangster played for amateur club Stirling County in two spells

He played for Stirling County in the Melrose Sevens in 2003.

Sangster also played for Hamilton RFC.

He played for Falkirk RFC

Sangster joined Grangemouth Stags as Head Coach and player in 2011 and played in the RBS National Bowl in 2013.

He now plays for Bannockburn RFC.

Sangster played in the memorial match for Gordon Mackay in 2012, his old Stirling team mate. He was capped by Scotland Students and by Scotland Under-21.

=== Provincial and professional career ===
At amateur district level Sangster played for Glasgow District at under 19 and under 21 grades.

While with Stirling, Sangster also played for the professional Glasgow side in two spells; the first from 1996 to 1998. He played for Glasgow in all of their Challenge Cup matches in 1996-97; and in all of their Heineken Cup matches in 1997-98.

As the replacement full back named for Warriors first match as a professional team - against Newbridge in the European Challenge Cup - Sangster has the distinction of being given Glasgow Warrior No. 19 for the provincial side.

On leaving Glasgow Warriors and Stirling County Sangster signed for Blackheath in London, England. Blackheath were then a professional side playing in the Allied Dunbar Premiership 2.

Sangster spent a year with Blackheath before returning to Glasgow Warriors and Stirling County. He was back playing with the then Glasgow Caledonians in 2000. He played on their Canadian tour in 2000. In 2001 he represented Caledonia Reds as an amateur district.
