= Gordon Mackay (rugby union) =

Scottish rugby union player

- Born: Gordon Mackay; 9 April 1969 Glasgow, Scotland
- Died: 24 July 2008 (aged 39) Glasgow, Scotland
- Height: 6 ft 4 in (1.93 m)
- Weight: 108 kg (17 st 0 lb)
- School: Glasgow Academy

Rugby union career
- Position: Flanker
Amateur team(s)
Years	Team	Apps	(Points)
- Glasgow Academicals RFC
–	Stirling County RFC		
–	Glasgow Hawks		
Senior career
Years	Team	Apps	(Points)
1996-99	Glasgow Warriors	8	(5)
–	Lyon OU		
Provincial / State sides
Years	Team	Apps	(Points)
	Glasgow District	9	
-	Scottish Districts		
International career
Years	Team	Apps	(Points)
1986	Scotland U16		
1990	Scotland U21		
Coaching career
- Years: Team
- 2007-8: Glasgow Academicals

Gordon Mackay (5 April 1969 – 24 July 2008) was a Scottish rugby union player who played for Glasgow, now Glasgow Warriors, at the Flanker position. Normally an openside flanker, Mackay could also play blindside flanker and lock.

== Rugby Union career ==
=== Amateur career ===
He started his rugby career playing for amateur side Glasgow Academicals.

He was to move from Academicals to Stirling County. He won the Division 1 championship with the club.

During this time with the Glasgow professional side, Mackay also played for the amateur Glasgow Hawks. He won a league and cup double with them in 1997–98.

=== Provincial career ===
He frequently played for the amateur Glasgow District side and played for a combined Scottish district side against South Africa.

=== Professional career ===
When the district sides turned professional in 1996, Mackay played for the new Glasgow professional side in its guises as Glasgow Rugby and Glasgow Caledonians. He was to play for the Glasgow side 17 times. He played for Glasgow in their first European match; a European conference match - now European Challenge Cup - against the Welsh side Newbridge RFC.

Mackay then moved to France to play for Lyon OU. However it was there he suffered a neck injury which ended his rugby career.

=== International career ===
He was capped by Scotland Schools (Under 16s) against France and was later to be capped by Scotland's Under-21s against Wales.

=== Coaching career ===
He latterly took up coaching again with Glasgow Academicals. He saved the club from relegation in the 2007–08 season. As well as coaching he was involved in getting sponsorship for the club and getting new floodlights for the club.

== Business career ==
After his rugby playing career finished he ran the Jellyhill coffee shop in the West End of Glasgow for several years, alongside his wife Irenne. He also became involved in property development.

== Death ==
He died at his home in Glasgow with a suspected heart attack on 24 July 2008. Tributes flooded in. Former team-mate and Glasgow captain Gordon Bulloch said that Mackay was one of the best rugby players never to have won a full Scotland cap and another Glasgow team-mate Kenny Logan said that Mackay was one of the few larger than life rugby individuals in the professional era. A tribute match to celebrate his life was played in his honour at Glasgow Academicals and Glasgow Warriors staff Fergus Wallace and Iain Monaghan took part.
