= Kenny Logan =

Scotland international rugby union player

- Born: Kenneth McKerrow Logan; 3 April 1972 (age 54) Stirling, Scotland

Rugby union career
- Position: Wing
Amateur team(s)
Years	Team	Apps	(Points)
1989–1997	Stirling County		
Senior career
Years	Team	Apps	(Points)
1996–1997	Glasgow	5	(31)
1997–2004	London Wasps	115	(862)
2004–2005	Glasgow	20	(25)
2005	London Scottish		
Provincial / State sides
Years	Team	Apps	(Points)
- Glasgow District
International career
Years	Team	Apps	(Points)
1992–2003	Scotland	70	(220)

Kenneth McKerrow Logan (born 3 April 1972) is a Scottish retired rugby union player who played wing for Stirling County RFC and Glasgow District at amateur level; Glasgow Warriors, Wasps RFC professional level; and Scotland at international level. He won three English Premierships Heineken Cup with Wasps RFC; and one Scottish Premiership title with Stirling County RFC in 1995, just before the game turned professional.

== Early life ==
Logan was born on 3 April 1972 in Stirling, Scotland. As a schoolboy, Logan had football trials as a goalkeeper for Dundee United and Hearts. He left school at sixteen and began his rugby career with his hometown club Stirling County, making his senior debut at 17.

== Club career ==
Logan played for the amateur provincial side Glasgow District. In 1996 the professional era began and the side became Glasgow Rugby. He played for the newly professional team in the three matches of the 1996–97 Scottish Inter-District Championship as well as 2 matches in that season's European Challenge Cup, the European Conference.

As the Full Back named for Warriors first match as a professional team - against Newbridge in the European Challenge Cup - Logan has the distinction of being given Glasgow Warrior No. 15 for the provincial side.

In 1997, Logan joined Wasps for his first season in English rugby. Logan was with Wasps for seven seasons. Whilst at Wasps he helped them win the Anglo-Welsh Cup in 1999 and 2000; he was a replacement in the 1999 final but started and scored a try and a conversion in 2000. He also helped Wasps win the 2002–03 Premiership Final. In 2004, he re-signed for Glasgow before joining London Scottish after a season. He retired from playing in 2005.

== International career ==
Logan played for Scotland A. Logan made his Scotland debut in 1992 against Australia at the age of 20. He was in and out of the side before cementing a position in the starting XV at the 1994 Five Nations Championship. He played in the 2003 World Cup. He won 70 caps over a 11-year period, scoring 20 tries in the process. He retired from international rugby union after the 2003 World Cup.

== Personal life ==
Logan was diagnosed with dyslexia as a child and found solace in playing sports. He attended Wallace High School but left without sitting for his final exams.

Logan dated newsreader Kirsty Young and moved to London, before the couple separated in 1999 after three years. In July 2001, he married television presenter Gabby Yorath. After undergoing IVF treatment, the couple welcomed twins, a son (Reuben), and a daughter, who were born on 28 July 2005.

Logan and his wife took part in the fifth series of the BBC celebrity dancing programme Strictly Come Dancing. Kenny was partnered with Ola and Gabby was partnered with James Jordan. Logan ended in 5th place. Gabby finished in 12th place.

Logan and his wife are past presidents of the children's charity Sparks. In 2009, Logan and Sparks joined forces to organise an annual mass-participation event entitled Logan's Challenge.

In August 2014, Logan was one of 200 public figures who were signatories to a letter to The Guardian expressing their hope that Scotland would vote to remain part of the United Kingdom in September's referendum on that issue.

Logan supports Rangers F.C.

In 2022, Logan, at his wife's suggestion, had a Well Man health check that unexpectedly revealed he was in the very early stages of prostate cancer and the medical diagnosis recommendation was to remove his entire prostate to prevent the further spread of cancer. The operation was successful.

== Honours ==
- Scottish Premiership: 1994–95
- Anglo Welsh Cup: 1998–99, 1999–2000
- English Premiership: 1996−97, 2002−03,
