= Malcolm Norval =

Scottish rugby union player (born 1967)

- Born: Malcolm Norval; 24 September 1967 (age 59) Scotland
- Height: 6 ft 5 in (1.96 m)
- Weight: 103 kg (16 st 3 lb)

Rugby union career
- Position: Lock
Amateur team(s)
Years	Team	Apps	(Points)
- Stirling County
Senior career
Years	Team	Apps	(Points)
1996-98	Glasgow Warriors	12	(0)
Provincial / State sides
Years	Team	Apps	(Points)
1991-96	Glasgow District		
International career
Years	Team	Apps	(Points)
- Scotland A

Malcolm Norval (born 24 September 1967) is a Scottish former rugby union player who played for Glasgow Rugby, now Glasgow Warriors at the Lock position.

== Rugby Union career ==
=== Amateur career ===
Norval played for amateur club side Stirling County.

On leaving Glasgow Norval continued to play for Stirling County but gradually it was a club that began a downward slide however in 2001 there were tipped for promotion back into the BT Premiership. A crop of talented youngsters emerged in the team. No fewer than six players were capped by Scotland at Under 19 or Under 21 age grades. By 2002, they began as if were challenging for the Premiership again. Norval was still in the side as a veteran. Their charge fizzled out at the end of the season and they ended up staving off relegation.

In 2005 Norval played as one of Rugby Ecosse Legends against Fife in an Andy Kerr memorial match, a dual code match for the Fife Lions rugby league star that died after an epileptic seizure.

=== Provincial and professional career ===
He was part of a winning Stirling County team that had up to seven players in the Glasgow District team.

He played in the European Conference, now European Challenge Cup, for Glasgow. As the Lock named for Warriors first match as a professional team - against Newbridge in the European Challenge Cup - Norval has the distinction of being given Glasgow Warrior No. 5 for the provincial side.

=== International career ===
Norval was capped for Scotland A.
