= Charles Afuakwah =

Ghanaian rugby union player (born 1966)

- Born: Charles Afuakwah; 27 June 1966 (age 60) Ghana
- Height: 6 ft 6 in (1.98 m)
- Weight: 111 kg (17 st 7 lb)
- University: Glasgow University

Rugby union career
- Position: Lock
Amateur team(s)
Years	Team	Apps	(Points)
- Glasgow Academicals RFC
–	Glasgow Hawks		
Senior career
Years	Team	Apps	(Points)
1996-98	Glasgow Warriors	3	(0)
Provincial / State sides
Years	Team	Apps	(Points)
- Glasgow District

Charles Afuakwah (born 27 June 1966 in Ghana) is a Ghanaian-born Scottish former rugby union player who played for Glasgow Rugby, now Glasgow Warriors at the Lock position.

== Rugby Union career ==
=== Amateur career ===
Before professionalism he played for Glasgow Academicals RFC.

He played for newly merged team Glasgow Hawks from 1997 while he still played with the professional Glasgow side.

=== Provincial and professional career ===
He played for the provincial Glasgow District side before it became professional as Glasgow Warriors.

When the provincial side professionalised in 1996, Afuakwah was the starting Lock in Glasgow's European Rugby Challenge Cup match against French side AS Montferrand. He has the Glasgow Warrior No. 24.

Afuakwah played for Glasgow in the European Cup matches against Ulster Rugby and London Wasps in season 1997-98. Glasgow won against Ulster Rugby but was beaten by Wasps.

He left Glasgow to solely play for amateur side Glasgow Hawks RFC in 1998 on Glasgow's merger with Caledonia Reds.

=== Administrative career ===
He is now President of the Glasgow Hawks club.

== Dental career ==
Outwith rugby, Afuakwah is now a dentist practising at Crosshill Dental Practice in Port Glasgow.
