= Kenny Baillie =

Scottish rugby union player

- Born: Kenny Baillie Scotland
- School: Hutchesons' Grammar School
- University: University of Edinburgh

Rugby union career
- Position: Fly-half
Amateur team(s)
Years	Team	Apps	(Points)
- Glasgow Academicals
–	Glasgow Hawks		
Senior career
Years	Team	Apps	(Points)
1996-97	Glasgow	1	(0)
- Correct as of 18 July 2015
International career
Years	Team	Apps	(Points)
- Scotland U21
- Correct as of 17 July 2015

Kenny Baillie is a former CEO of the rugby clubs Glasgow Hawks, Glasgow Warriors and London Scottish; and a former player of Glasgow Hawks and Glasgow Warriors.

== Rugby Union career ==
=== Amateur career ===
Starting his amateur career at Glasgow Academicals on the merger of Glasgow High Kelvinside with the club to form Glasgow Hawks, Baillie was to become a Hawks player.

Baillie captained Glasgow Hawks as a player.

=== Professional career ===
He was to be called up by Glasgow Rugby (now Glasgow Warriors) for their 1996 match against AS Montferrand (now Clermont) in the European Cup.

=== International career ===
He was capped by Scotland at Under 21 level.

=== Administration career ===
He was on the Board of Directors at Glasgow Hawks since 2005 and became their full-time CEO in 2008.

Baillie was once again called up by the Warriors, this time as CEO in 2009. He was to take over in October 2009 from Colin Thomson who held the position as caretaker when Ian Riddoch quit in July. He held the post till the end of season 2011 and he tried again to quit rugby.

In March 2013 he moved back into rugby, becoming the CEO of London Scottish. In the summer of 2015 he announced that he would quit the Exiles.

== Business career ==
After studying at the University of Edinburgh Baillie moved to the IT sector; first with software production then moving on to business development. He was the Business Development Director for the University of Strathclyde's spin-out Dynamic Knowledge Corporation and Vice President of business development for Graham America, Inc. (Graham Technology).

Relocating in London, he became an Account Director at Westfield Shoppingtowns Ltd. from 2011 to 2013; a company which owns shopping centres worldwide.
