= Brian Robertson (rugby union) =

Scottish rugby union player & coach

- Born: G. Brian Robertson; 9 August 1959 (age 67) Scotland
- Height: 1.83 m (6 ft 0 in)
- Weight: 110 kg (17 st 5 lb)

Rugby union career
- Position: Tighthead Prop
Amateur team(s)
| Years | Team | Apps | (Points) |
- Stirling County
Senior career
| Years | Team | Apps | (Points) |
| 1996-97 | Glasgow Warriors | 8 | (0) |
Provincial / State sides
| Years | Team | Apps | (Points) |
- Glasgow District
International career
| Years | Team | Apps | (Points) |
| 1990-91 | Scotland 'B' | 3 | |
- Scotland 'A'
Coaching career
- Years: Team
- Stirling County

Brian Robertson (born 9 August 1959 in Scotland) is a Scottish former rugby union player and coach. He formerly played for the professional provincial side now known as Glasgow Warriors. Robertson played for Glasgow in the 1996-97 season. His usual position was at tighthead prop.

== Rugby Union career ==
=== Amateur career ===
Robertson played amateur rugby for Stirling County. He was part of a formidable front three in the forward pack; his Stirling County teammate Stewart Hamilton in the book Giants of Scottish Rugby remembers: "We had a great side then particularly the pack.The front row was Brian Robertson, Kevin McKenzie and George Graham. Brian unfortunately had a bad neck injury but the other two went on to play for Scotland." Coached by Richie Dixon, the County team won promotion from Division 2 and then won Division 1 in season 1994-95.

=== Provincial and professional career ===
He also represented the provincial side Glasgow District in the amateur era. He was part of Glasgow's touring squad that played the Netherlands and Belgium

He was in Glasgow District's famous 1989-90 side which won the Scottish Inter-District Championship that season; winning outright the title for only the third time in Glasgow's history. That season Glasgow went unbeaten against allcomers, including the touring Fiji national rugby union team although Robertson missed Glasgow's Irish tour that year.

In 1992 he received a shoulder injury and was dropped by the Glasgow side. However this break wasn't for long and he came back for Glasgow's next match.

He played for the amateur district until 1996 when they turned professional.

Robertson played in all 8 competitive matches for Glasgow Warriors in their first season; 3 matches in the 1996-97 Scottish Inter-District Championship and 5 matches in the European Conference, now European Challenge Cup. He started in the Warriors first professional match; and is Glasgow Warrior No. 3.

=== International career ===
He was capped by Scotland 'B' and Scotland 'A' but never received a full senior cap.

His first cap for the 'B' side was on 22 December 1990 against Ireland 'B'.

=== Coaching career ===
The veteran tighthead became a coach at Stirling County. However he quit in 2004 stating that he wanted a break from rugby.
