= Guy Perrett =

Scottish rugby union player

- Born: Guy Perett; 22 March 1975 (age 51) Lanark, Scotland
- Height: 2.03 m (6 ft 8 in)
- Weight: 114 kg (17 st 13 lb)
- University: University of Glasgow

Rugby union career
- Position: Lock
Amateur team(s)
Years	Team	Apps	(Points)
1994–2004	West of Scotland		
–	Glasgow Hawks		
–	West of Scotland		
Senior career
Years	Team	Apps	(Points)
1996–2002	Glasgow Warriors	25	(0)
2002–04	Edinburgh Rugby		
International career
Years	Team	Apps	(Points)
2002	Scotland A	1	(0)
Coaching career
- Years: Team
- West of Scotland (Director of Rugby)

Guy Perrett (born 22 March 1975) is a doctor and former Scotland 'A' international rugby union player who played with Glasgow Rugby, now Glasgow Warriors. His regular playing position was Lock. Perrett's rugby career spanned the amateur and professional era.

He received his only Scotland 'A' cap on 5 November 2002 against Romania. Scotland won the match 21-18.

== Early life ==
Perrett was born in Lanark, Scotland. He represented Glasgow Schools in 1992 and 1993 while still with Bearsden Academy.

== Rugby career ==
Starting out with West of Scotland he joined Glasgow on the Scottish game turning professional in 1996; a year after the 'Open Game' was announced in 1995. Whilst at university and playing for West of Scotland he shared a flat with Gordon Bulloch and David McLeish. All three players went on to represent Glasgow.

After a two-year break from representative rugby to concentrate on his medical studies, in April 2001 he returned to play for Glasgow Caley Reds. He made nine appearances in the Heineken Cup for Glasgow. He played in the Scottish Inter-District Championship; in the squad in 1996–97 and playing in 1997–98. He played for Glasgow against the touring South Africa national rugby union team.

He played with Glasgow until 2002, although he did drop out of professional rugby for two years to focus on his medical studies.

During this time he played with West of Scotland when not playing for Glasgow.

He joined Edinburgh Rugby in 2002. Initially making appearance as a substitute, he made his first start in December 2002. During his Edinburgh time he continued to play for West of Scotland. In July 2004 Perrett was released by Edinburgh, having decided to pursue his medical, and joined amateur side Glasgow Hawks. Hawks spokesman Hugh Barrow said: "Guy will be a huge asset to us in our title defence. He has made it clear that his medical activities are his priority and we are happy to accommodate that."

By 2006, Perrett had returned once again to his first club West of Scotland. Perret finished his playing rugby career with West of Scotland in 2010. In 2015 he was the Director of Rugby for West of Scotland.
