= Fergus Wallace =

Scottish rugby union player

- Born: Fergus Donald Wallace; 2 February 1965 (age 61)
- Height: 1.88 m (6 ft 2 in)
- Weight: 95 kg (14 st 13 lb)
- School: Kelvinside Academy
- Notable relative(s): Murray Wallace, brother

Rugby union career
- Position: Flanker
Amateur team(s)
Years	Team	Apps	(Points)
- Clarkston RFC
–	Glasgow High Kelvinside		
–	Boroughmuir RFC		
–	Hamilton RFC		
–	Glasgow Hawks		
Senior career
Years	Team	Apps	(Points)
1996-98	Glasgow	18	(5)
Provincial / State sides
Years	Team	Apps	(Points)
- Glasgow District
International career
Years	Team	Apps	(Points)
- Scotland A
National sevens team
Years	Team		Comps
- Scotland 7s

Fergus Wallace (born 2 February 1965) is a Scottish former rugby union player for Glasgow Rugby, now known as Glasgow Warriors. He played as a flanker.

== Rugby Union career ==
=== Amateur career ===
Wallace's playing career straddled the amateur and professional era.

He began his club career with Clarkston before moving on to Glasgow High Kelvinside, Boroughmuir, Hamilton and Glasgow Hawks.

=== Provincial career ===
He captained the amateur Glasgow District in season 1989-90 when they famously won the Scottish Inter-District Championship that season, and were unbeaten the entire season, also beating the touring Fiji international side. He captained the Glasgow District side for 6 years.

As the Flanker named for Warriors first match as a professional team - against Newbridge in the European Challenge Cup - Wallace has the distinction of being given Glasgow Warrior No. 6 for the provincial side.

He played for the professional Glasgow side in the Heineken Cup in 1997-98. Glasgow got to the European Cup's quarter-finals that year, which remains the Glasgow Warriors best joint-equal performance in that competition.

=== International career ===
Fergus narrowly missed out on a full Scotland international cap. He has stated "Not getting a full cap was disappointing and I think I might have got in if they had selected the team differently in 1994. I was in the Scotland A side that beat South Africa at The Greenyards and had a good game, scoring our try, but strangely they had picked the Scotland team for the Test match before the A game." However he now jokes about this; he told the St. Andrews Sporting Club: "I was often compared to the Lions great, Willie John McBride. Yes, folk would say to me: 'Compared to Willie John McBride, you're rubbish!'"

Wallace did however get capped by Scotland A and Scotland Sevens and also captained a Scotland XV against Zimbabwe. He also played for a veteran British and Irish Lions side in 2001.

=== Administration ===
He moved back to rugby becoming the Business Development Manager of Glasgow Warriors in November 2011.

== Outside of rugby ==
On leaving rugby Fergus became a painter and decorator, then a chartered surveyor. He also worked with networking companies Laads Consultancy and Klas International.

In December 2014 he moved to become the Head of Sports Partnerships at House of Fraser.
