= David McLeish (rugby union) =

Scottish rugby union player

- Born: David McLeish; 26 July 1975 (age 51)
- Height: 6 ft 4 in (1.93 m)
- Weight: 102 kg (16 st 1 lb)
- School: Kelso High School

Rugby union career
- Position: Number Eight
Amateur team(s)
Years	Team	Apps	(Points)
1993	Kelso		
1993-1994	Glasgow Hutchesons Aloysians		
1994-1998	West of Scotland		
Senior career
Years	Team	Apps	(Points)
1996-1998	Glasgow	16	(5)

David McLeish (born 26 July 1975) is a former Scottish rugby union player who played for Glasgow Rugby, now Glasgow Warriors at the number 8 position.

== Rugby Union career ==
=== Amateur career ===
McLeish broke into the Kelso RFC first team when still a schoolboy.

He moved through to Glasgow to study Product Design engineering at the University of Strathclyde.

In Glasgow, McLeish first joined the amateur club Glasgow Hutchesons Aloysians until 1994, when he won a place at West of Scotland

=== Professional career ===
He shared a flat with West of Scotland and Glasgow Warriors teammates Guy Perrett and Gordon Bulloch. All three players were called up by the fledgling professional Glasgow side. McLeish was a regular in the Glasgow side for 2 years and played in European competition for the club throughout his time there.

As the No. 8 named for Warriors first match as a professional team - against Newbridge in the European Challenge Cup - McLeish has the distinction of being given Glasgow Warrior No. 8 for the provincial side.

When not playing for Glasgow, McLeish played the rest of the season with West of Scotland.

=== International career ===
As a schoolboy at Kelso High School, McLeish represented Scotland Schoolboys at international level in 1993.

== Business career ==
On the merger of the Scottish professional teams from four to two - involving Glasgow merging with the Caledonia Reds for the season 1998-99 - McLeish left professional rugby. He then moved into industry.
