= Glasgow High Kelvinside =

Scottish rugby union club

GHK Rugby
- Full name: Glasgow High / Kelvinside Rugby Football Club
- Union: Scottish Rugby Union
- Nickname: GHK
- Founded: 1982; 44 years ago
- Location: Glasgow, Scotland
- Ground: Old Anniesland
- President: Gavin Hutton
- Coach: Kenny Brown
- Captain: Calum Busby
- League: Scottish National League Division One
- 2025–26: Scottish National League Division Two, 1st of 10 (promoted)
Team kit

Official website
- ghkrfc.com

Glasgow High Kelvinside , often abbreviated to GHK, is an amateur rugby union club in Glasgow, Scotland. They currently play in Scottish National League Division One.

== History ==
Glasgow High Kelvinside was formed in 1982 by the merger of Kelvinside Academy and High School of Glasgow rugby clubs; Kelvinside Academicals and Glasgow HSFP. Both Glasgow High FP and Kelvinside Accies were struggling clubs at the time: Glasgow High in the Third Division; Kelvinside Academicals in the Fifth Division.

=== Impact of professionalism ===
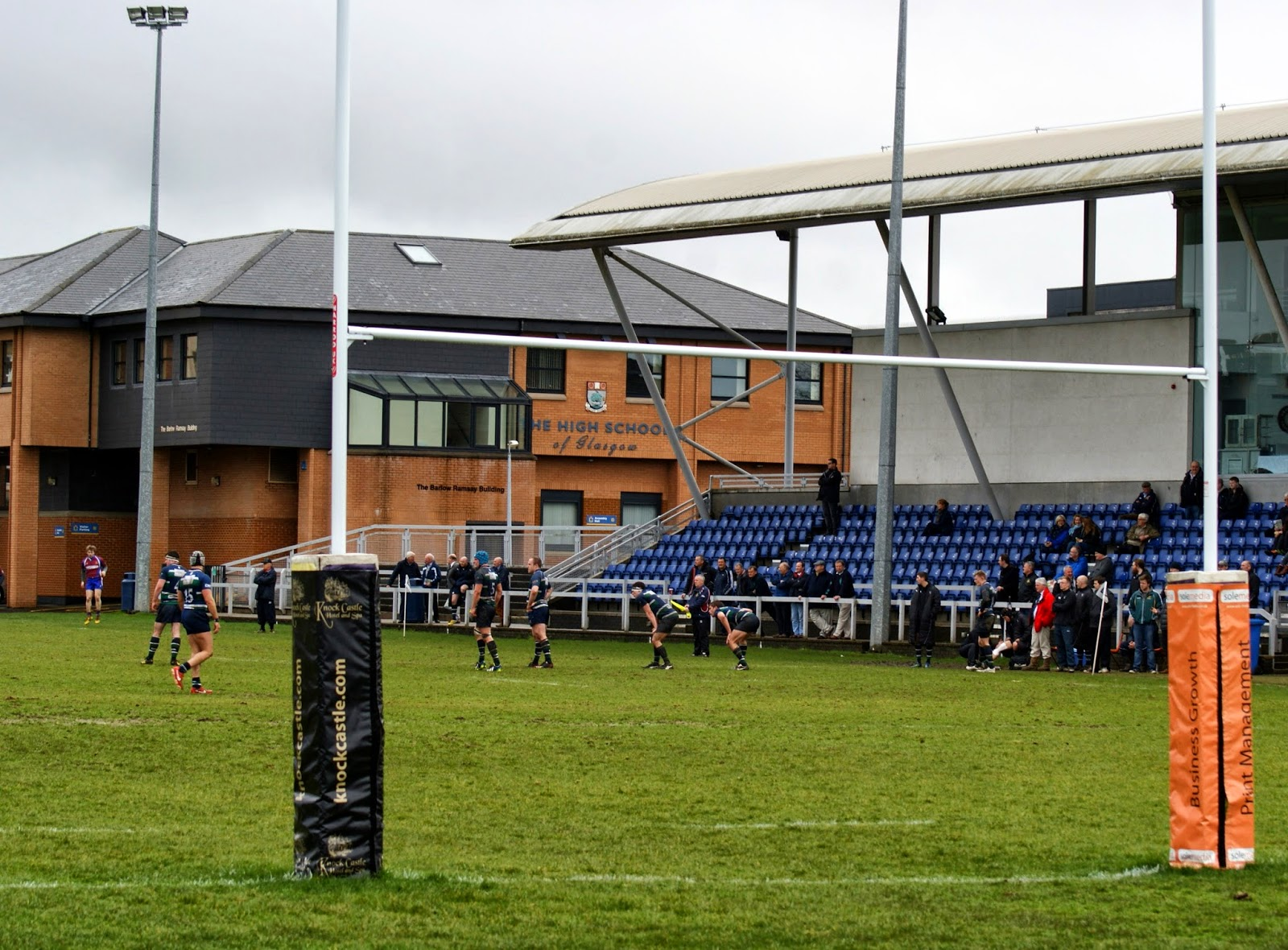
Old Anniesland in 2014

When professionalism was finally allowed by the International Rugby Football Board in 1995, Scotland took a while to adapt. The SRU decided to make Scotland's four district teams professional in 1996. Glasgow's district team became the professional rugby union team now known as Glasgow Warriors.

However it was recognised that the amateur Glasgow clubs might provide a better pathway to professionalism for their players if some of the amateur Glasgow area clubs merged. The clubs considered for merger were Glasgow High Kelvinside, Glasgow Academicals and West of Scotland. Taking an initial letter each from High, Academicals, West and Kelvinside it was proposed the new side would be called the Glasgow Hawks.

The Milngavie-based club West of Scotland pulled out of the planned merger. Nevertheless, Glasgow Academicals and Glasgow High Kelvinside did merge in 1997. The name Hawks was kept for the merged team.

=== Glasgow Hawks ===
The merger of the two sides was not without its detractors and a few on each side of the GHK - Academical fence were concerned about losing their history in the new side. Glasgow Academicals continued as a league side the following year in 1998 but they had to start again at the bottom rung of the league structure.

=== Glasgow High Kelvinside reborn ===
Following the Academicals example of starting again, Glasgow High Kelvinside also started again in the bottom rung of the league structure. However they remain associated with the Glasgow Hawks.

In June 2014, former Glasgow Warriors and GHK player Cameron Little was announced as the head coach at the club for the 2015–16 season. The club won promotion to Scottish National League Division Three after winning all 18 league matches in the 2014–15 season. It followed that up by winning the Scottish National League Division Three title in the 2015–16 season and gaining promotion to the Scottish National League Division Two in the 2016–17 season. In 2020 Peter Wright "The Teapot" was named as head coach. In the 2021/2022 season, they won promotion to Scottish National League Division One.

== Sevens ==
The club once ran the Glasgow High Kelvinside Sevens tournament. Kelvinside Academicals had a history with Sevens - running their own tournament in 1922 and then from 1974 to 1981, with teams playing for the Minerva Cup. Glasgow HSFP ran theirs on just one occasion in 1929. (Glasgow HSFP won the 1922 Kelvinside Academicals Sevens, Dunfermline won the Glasgow HSFP Sevens of 1929.) When the sides merged as Glasgow High Kelvinside the Glasgow High Kelvinside Sevens tournament still offered the Minerva Cup for its winners from 1982 until it folded in 1989.

== Honours ==
- Scottish National League Division Two: 2021–22
- Scottish National League Division Three: 2015–16
- Langholm Sevens: 1995
- Clarkston Sevens: 1984
- Greenock Sevens: 1984, 1987
- Ayr Sevens: 1994
- Allan Glen's Sevens: 1984
- Hillhead Jordanhill Sevens: 1989, 1991, 1992, 1993, 1994, 1996
- Hillhead Sevens: 1985, 1987
- Bearsden Sevens: 1990
- Glasgow University Sevens: 1987
- Helensburgh Sevens: 1986
- Lochaber Sevens: 1992
- Cambuslang Sevens: 1990

== Notable former players ==
=== Scotland internationalists ===
The following former Glasgow High Kelvinside players have represented Scotland at full international level.

- (Scotland) Shade Munro
- (Scotland) Murray Wallace
- (Scotland) Alan Watt

=== Glasgow Warriors ===
The following former Glasgow High Kelvinside players have represented Glasgow Warriors at professional level.

- Harry Bassi
- George Breckenridge
- Chris Docherty
- Gerry Hawkes
- Scott Hutton
- Cameron Little
- John MacLeod
- Shade Munro
- Andrew Ness
- Fergus Wallace
- Murray Wallace
- Alan Watt
