= Andrew Garry =

Scottish rugby union player

Andrew "the destroyer " Garry
- Born: Andrew Garry; 30 September 1966 (age 60) Scotland
- Height: 168 cm (5 ft 6 in)
- Weight: 92 kg (14 st 7 lb)
- School: Kirkintilloch High School
- Occupation: Teacher of Physical Education

Rugby union career
- Position: Fly-half
Amateur team(s)
Years	Team	Apps	(Points)
- Lenzie RFC
–	Glasgow Academicals		
–	Watsonians		
Senior career
Years	Team	Apps	(Points)
1996-97	Glasgow Warriors	312	(0)
Provincial / State sides
Years	Team	Apps	(Points)
- Glasgow District
International career
Years	Team	Apps	(Points)
1988	Scotland Under 18		

Andrew Garry (born 30 September 1966) is a former Scottish rugby union player. He played for the amateur Glasgow District side and after professionalism played for Glasgow Rugby, now named the Glasgow Warriors. He played at Fly-half but also played at Centre and Full Back. He is currently a Physical Education teacher at Dunfermline High School, having worked there since 1993 following a one year post as a PE teacher at George Watson’s College, Edinburgh.

His school Kirkintilloch High School at the time did not play rugby so Garry instead played for Lenzie RFC. His form got him selected for the SRU's President's XV; a side made up of State school pupils.

In 1985 he was playing for Glasgow Academicals at Centre. and by 1987 he was playing Full Back and Centre for the club.

In 1988 Garry played for the Scotland Under 18 side.

In 1991 he was playing for Watsonians though was noted as a former Lenzie RFC player. In 1994 Garry was noted as playing for Watsonians., also in 1995 and in 1996 and then in 1998, 1999 and 2000.

Garry also played in the combined Glasgow - Edinburgh side to play against the Australian national team, touring in 1996.

Garry played for Glasgow District at age grade level. He played for the Under-21 District side in season 1988-89. He was then to move on to full Glasgow District side and played for Glasgow District in their 1995 match against South African provincial side Griqualand West.

He played for Glasgow Warriors in all of their Scottish Inter-District Championship matches in the season 1996-97. He also played for Glasgow in their European Conference - now European Challenge Cup - match against French side Agen.
