= Murray Wallace (rugby union) =

Scotland international rugby union player

- Born: Murray Ian Wallace; 13 October 1967 (age 59) Milton of Campsie, East Dunbartonshire, Scotland
- Height: 1.90 m (6 ft 3 in)
- Weight: 95 kg (14 st 13 lb)
- Notable relative(s): Fergus Wallace, brother

Rugby union career
- Position: Flanker
Senior career
Years	Team	Apps	(Points)
1996-98	Glasgow Warriors	11	(5)
International career
Years	Team	Apps	(Points)
1996-97	Scotland	3	(5)

Murray Ian Wallace (13 October 1967, Milton of Campsie, East Dunbartonshire, was a Scottish international rugby union player, who played for Scotland. He was capped three times between 1996 and 1997.
