= Glasgow Hawks RFC =

Scottish rugby union club, based in Glasgow

Coordinates: 55.8869°N 4.3100°W

(Scotland) Glasgow Hawks
- Full name: Glasgow Hawks RFC
- Union: SRU
- Founded: 1997; 29 years ago (Note: Formed after the merger of clubs Glasgow Academicals (est. 1866) and Glasgow High Kelvinside (1982).)
- Location: Glasgow, Scotland
- Ground: Balgray (Capacity: 3,000)
- Chairman: Kenny Hamilton
- Coach(es): Andy Hill, Thomas Davidson
- Captain: Stephen Leckey
- League: Scottish Premiership
- 2024–25: Scottish Premiership, 8th of 12
Team kit

Official website
- glasgowhawks.com

Glasgow Hawks is an amateur rugby union team in Glasgow, Scotland. They were Premiership Division One champions for three consecutive seasons from 2003–04 to 2005–06.

== History ==
In Paris on 27 August 1995 a meeting of the International Rugby Board declared that professionalism was to be allowed in rugby. At that time there were differing views as to whether districts or Premier clubs in Scotland would become professional. Several Glasgow players decided to move to other teams.

During season 1996–97 Brian Simmers decided to look into a merger of Glasgow Academicals (GAC) and Glasgow High Kelvinside (GHK). After meetings with the Scottish Rugby Union, Dunc Paterson, Bill Watson, Jim Telfer and Bill Hogg, and meetings with senior players from both clubs, Fergus Wallace and Murray Wallace, Walter Malcolm, Cameron Little, Gordon Mackay, Charles Afuakwah, Stuart Simmers, he produced a proposal for rugby at Anniesland which created a new club, Glasgow Hawks, but retained the "founder" clubs, Glasgow Academicals and GHK. Discussions had also taken place with West of Scotland to come on board but these did not progress. However the "W" in HAWKS still remains.

This initial structure was finalised with the help of Sandy Neilson (GHK), Lorne Crerar (GHK), Richard Eadie (GHK), Graham McKnight (GAC), Sandy Bannerman (GAC), David Jerdan (GHK), Kenny Hamilton (GHK), David Williams (GHK) and Hugh Barrow and it was agreed that this was preferable to a straight merger as it would maximise player numbers at Old and New Anniesland.

Ownership of Glasgow Hawks RFC Limited would be one share (50%) each held by Glasgow Academicals Sports Club (now Glasgow Academical Club) and GHK (now Glasgow High School Club Ltd.). It was also agreed that Hawks 1st XV would play alternately at Old and New Anniesland with the 2nd XV playing at the unused ground. (For cost and facility reasons Hawks moved entirely to Old Anniesland in 2001 and as a result of poor Old Anniesland ground conditions, Hawks 2nd XV agreed, in 2007, to play at New Anniesland).

Brian Simmers established with the SRU that Hawks would take over the top club's (Accies) position in Premier 2 from the end of season 1996–97 but was unable to persuade them to allow GHK and Accies a position in the National Divisions and they therefore had to start at the foot of the Regionals.

This structure was presented to each of the "founder" clubs at their respective general assemblies, both held on 3 June 1997, and a massive majority at each club agreed the proposal. In June 2003 Glasgow Hawks became a full member of the SRU.

== Rugby ==
In season 1997–98 contracted players were playing for Premier 1 clubs and Hawks, funded by generous sponsors. The majority were Scottish representative players with eventual internationalists Glenn Metcalfe, Derek Stark and Murray Wallace joined by Cook Island internationalists Tommy Hayes and Mike Beckham. Hawks won the second division league title, the Scottish Cup and were 2nd XV league champions. At the end of this very successful season eight players moved out of Hawks to professional rugby in Scotland and beyond.

1999–00: Hawks lost to Boroughmuir in the Scottish Cup Final and played the Co-optimists to mark the opening of the Jimmie Ireland stand at Old Anniesland and combined with West of Scotland, again to play the Co-optimists, to mark the opening of their new stand at Burnbrae.

2001–02: Hawks are runners-up to Hawick (losing in extra time) in the Scottish Cup Final.

2003–04: Hawks win Premier 1 Championship, Scottish Cup and 2nd XV Championship.

2004–05: Hawks retain Premier 1 and 2nd XV League Championships

2005–06: Hawks secure the hattrick of Premier 1 Championships at Meggetland, the first time in 80 years that a club from Glasgow has achieved this honour.

2006–07: Hawks win the Scottish Cup for the third time and in May 2007 beat the Royal Navy in a memorial match for Craig Hodgkinson.

=== Hawks Players Capped ===
- 9 Scottish Caps, 1 "A" cap, 5 Sevens caps
- Scotland "Club" Caps: 6. Scotland U 21 Caps: 25. Scotland U19 Caps: 11
- Hawks Players awarded professional contracts: 37
- Hawks Coaches awarded professional contracts: Shade Munro, Peter Wright.
- Glasgow Award for Services to Rugby: 2004 John Roxburgh 2005 Tom Howie
- Glasgow Player of the year: 2004 Mark Sitch.
- Scottish Rugby Team of the year: Glasgow Hawks 1998 and 2004.
- Scottish Premier 1 Player of the year: 2005 Richard Maxton.
- Glasgow Team of the year, all sports: 2004 Glasgow Hawks

== Honours ==
- Scottish Premiership
  - Champions (3): 2003–04, 2004–05, 2005–06
- Scottish Cup
  - Champions: (2) 2003–04, 2006–07
  - Runners-Up: (3) 1999–00, 2001–02, 2013–14
- Scottish National League Division One
  - Champions (3): 1997–98, 2012–13
- Gala Sevens
  - Champions (1): 1998
- Glasgow City Sevens
  - Champions (3): 2002, 2010, 2015
- Greenock Sevens
  - Champions: 1999, 2001, 2016
- Oban Sevens
  - Champions: 1998
- Glasgow University Sevens
  - Champions: 2008

== Notable former players ==
For Internationals from the club's predecessor clubs please see:

Glasgow Academicals RFC
Glasgow High Kelvinside

International caps from Glasgow Hawks:

- (Scotland) Glenn Metcalfe
- (Scotland) Derek Stark
- (Scotland) Gordon McIlwham
- (Scotland) Murray Wallace
- (Cook Islands) Tommy Hayes
- (Cook Islands) Mike Beckham
- (Scotland) Max Evans
- (Zimbabwe) Ian Noble
- (Zimbabwe) Nico Nyemba
- (Scotland) Richie Gray
- (Scotland) Duncan Weir
- (Hong Kong) Ally Maclay
- (Fiji) Leone Nakarawa
- (Scotland) Zander Fagerson
- (Scotland) George Horne
- (Scotland) Matt Fagerson

== See also ==
- Sport in Glasgow

== Bibliography ==
- Massie, Allan A Portrait of Scottish Rugby (Polygon, Edinburgh; ISBN 0-904919-84-6)
