= 1883–84 Scottish Districts season =

Rugby union competition

- Countries: Scotland
- Date: 1883–84
- Matches played: 1

The 1883–84 Scottish Districts season is a record of all the rugby union matches for Scotland's district teams.

It includes the East of Scotland District versus West of Scotland District trial match.

== History ==
Edinburgh District won the Inter-City for the first time in three years.

The East v West match was played on 26 January 1884. Davie Sanderson from Melrose, capped by the East side, is one of the originators (along with Ned Haig) of the rugby sevens game.

== Results ==
Date	Try	Conversion	Penalty	Dropped goal	Goal from mark	Notes
1876–1885	1 try	1 goal	1 goal	1 goal	—	
1876–1885	Match decided by a majority of goals, or if the number of goals is equal by a majority of tries					

=== Inter-City ===
1 December 1883
3pm

Glasgow District	1 try - 1 goal, 2 tries	Edinburgh District
Try: David McCowan	Report	Try: Walter Irvine; Andrew Ramsay Don-Wauchope; Todd; Con: Veitch

Hamilton Crescent, Glasgow
Attendance: 2,000

Glasgow District: D. A. C. Reid (Glasgow University), David Kidston (Glasgow Academicals). R. G. Eaglesham (West of Scotland), Alexander Stephen (West of Scotland), John Alexander Neilson (Glasgow Academicals) C. W. Dunlop (West of Scotland), John Jamieson (West of Scotland), David Morton (West of Scotland), Gordon Mitchell (West of Scotland), David McCowan (West of Scotland), H. S. Brown (West of Scotland), George Robb (Glasgow Academicals), William Andrew Walls (Glasgow Academicals), R. H. Young (Glasgow Academicals), J. S. Lang (Glasgow University) [captain]
Edinburgh District: J. P. Veitch (Royal HSFP), E.T. Roland (Edinburgh University), J. Glegg (Edinburgh University), Andrew Ramsay Don-Wauchope (Edinburgh University), D. M. Orr (Edinburgh Academicals), Thomas Ainslie (Edinburgh Institution F.P.) [captain], David Somerville (Edinburgh Institution F.P.), Robert Maitland (Edinburgh Institution F.P.), Charles Reid (Edinburgh Academicals), John Guthrie Tait (Edinburgh Academicals), Walter Irvine (Edinburgh Academicals), C. Morrison (Edinburgh Wanderers), W. M. Gossip (Royal HSFP), William Peterkin (Edinburgh University), J. Todd (Watsonians)

=== Other Scottish matches ===
26 January 1884

East of Scotland District	1 try - 0	West of Scotland District
Try: Don Wauchope	Report

Raeburn Place, Edinburgh

East: J. P. Veitch (Royal HSFP), back; E. T. Roland (Edinburgh Wanderers), W. A. Macfarlane (Royal HSFP), G. Maitland (Edinburgh Institution), half-backs; A. R. Don Wauchope (Edinburgh Wanderers), D. Sanderson (Melrose), quarter-backs; T. Ainslie (Edinburgh Institution) [captain], D. Somerville (Edinburgh Institution), R. Maitland (Edinburgh Institution), and J. Greig (Edinburgh Wanderers), C. Reid (Edinburgh Academicals), W. A. Peterkin (Edinburgh University), J. Tod (Watsonians), E. Morrison (Edinburgh Wanderers) and W. M. Gossip (Royal HSFP), forwards
West: D. A. C. Reid (University), back :D. W. Kidston (Glasgow Academicals), R Eaglesham (West of Scotland), half-backs; E. E. Steven (West of Scotland), E. Leitke (Southern), quarters; J. French (Glasgow Academicals), J. Jamleson (West of Scotland), Highlands (West of Scotland), J. B. Brown, W. A. Walls, G. H. Robb, R. A. Young (Academicals), and H. Edmiston (Southern), D. Morton, A R. Paterson

=== English matches ===
No other District matches played.

=== International matches ===
No touring matches this season.
