= Graham Findlay =

Scottish rugby union player, referee & cricketer

- Born: David Graham Findlay; 10 November 1864 Glasgow, Scotland
- Died: 5 December 1924 (aged 60) Glasgow, Scotland
- School: Kelvinside Academy
- Notable relative(s): Crawford Findlay, brother

Rugby union career
- Position: Forward
Amateur team(s)
Years	Team	Apps	(Points)
-	West of Scotland		
Provincial / State sides
Years	Team	Apps	(Points)
1886	Glasgow District		
Refereeing career
Years	Competition		Apps
1894-	Scottish Districts		
1896	Home Nations		
–	Scottish Unofficial Championship		

23rd President of the Scottish Rugby Union
- In office 1896–1897
- Preceded by: Bill Maclagan
- Succeeded by: Robert Rainie

Graham Findlay (10 November 1864 – 5 December 1924) was a Scottish rugby union player. He later became an international referee and was the 23rd President of the Scottish Rugby Union.

== Rugby Union career ==
=== Amateur career ===
Findlay played for West of Scotland. He was still playing for the club in 1888 when he turned out for West of Scotland against Hawick and Wilton.

=== Provincial career ===
Findlay played for Glasgow District in their match against North of Scotland District on 2 January 1886.

=== Referee career ===
He refereed the inter-city match between Glasgow District and Edinburgh District in December 1894.

He refereed the Yorkshire versus Lancashire county match on 23 November 1895.

Findlay refereed the international matches between England and Wales on 4 January 1896; and England and Ireland on 1 February 1896.

He also refereed in the Scottish Unofficial Championship.

=== Administrative career ===
Findlay was the Honorary Secretary at West of Scotland in 1893 and remained so for the rest of his life.

He was Vice-President of the Scottish Rugby Union in 1896. He organised a charity rugby union versus association football match when his selected side of Rugby Rovers met Queen's Park. The charity was the Langside Dorcas society.

Findlay became the 23rd President of the Scottish Rugby Union. He served the 1896–97 term in office.

== Cricket career ==
Findlay played cricket for the West of Scotland Cricket Club. He also helped the Earl of Eglington XI run his invitational matches at Eglinton Castle, and he played as a wicket keeper for the Eglinton Castle Cricket Club side throughout the 1890s.

== Outside of rugby and cricket ==
Findlay was a wine and spirit broker.

He died of pneumonia at the age of 60.
