= Glasgow Academicals RFC =

Scottish rugby union club, based in Glasgow

Glasgow Academicals
- Full name: The Glasgow Academical Football Club
- Union: SRU
- Nickname: Accies
- Founded: 1866; 160 years ago
- Location: Glasgow, Scotland
- Region: Glasgow
- Ground(s): New Anniesland formerly Old Anniesland; Burnbank Park
- Coach(es): Ryan Grant (Head Coach), Ruaridh Jackson, Duncan Weir
- Captain: Ross Cowan
- League: Scottish National League Division One
- 2025–26: Scottish National League Division One, 3rd of 10
Team kit

Official website
- www.glasgowacciesrfc.com

The Glasgow Academical Football Club is the third oldest rugby football club in Scotland. The club was also a founder member of the Scottish Football Union (the future SRU) in 1873.

== History ==
=== Glasgow Hawks ===
The 1911–12 squad

In 1997 the decision was made to combine the first XV's of Glasgow Academicals and close rivals Glasgow High Kelvinside (themselves a fairly new club having been formed when the struggling Glasgow High FP and Kelvinside Academicals clubs combined in 1982), something that was predicted would happen only after "hell freezes over". The combined team was named the Glasgow Hawks. The Hawks won the second division championship and the Scottish Cup in their first year and have since continued in the first division - winning the league in 2004, 2005 and 2006, and the Cup again in 2004 and 2007. Glenn Metcalfe together with Derek Stark and Gordon McIlwham became Scottish Internationals while Mike Beckham and Tommy Hayes played for the Cook Islands.

=== Glasgow Academicals ===
With the advent of the Hawks, the Glasgow Academicals lost many of their strong first XV but made the decision to continue as a league side for the following year - which under SRU rules meant that they had to rejoin the lowest league of Scottish rugby. In 1998 the club competed in Glasgow District division 3. The club raced back up through the leagues, being promoted as league champions five years in succession.

In 2016, their 150th year, they won West Regional League Division One giving them promotion to Scottish National League Division Three for 2016/17, after only losing one league game all season. Of the 157 clubs in the National and Regional leagues in 2015–16, only three had a winning % record which bettered Accies. Success came on the 9 April 2016 with a 26–7 win over Allan Glens at the Bearyards. Days after winning the league, the 150th year of the club was celebrated in April 2016, with a 1st XV match against a team mainly principally from West of Scotland F.C. but including representatives from the other six clubs who, along with Accies and West, had founded the SRU in 1873.

In recent years, the club has toured overseas to destinations including Zimbabwe (defeating leading province Matabeleland), United States (Carolina), Poland, in the 150th year Luxembourg, and most recently Budapest in 2017.

In 2017 the club finished third. They did win 13 games in a row, including a 163–10 defeat of Livingston, followed up by 95–0 against Greenock Wanderers the following week. The final “points for” tally in the league was 930 from 22 games – the highest in the national leagues – with a points difference of 600.

In April 2018, Accies secured promotion to National 2 with an 8-try win at Murrayfield Wanderers.

== Glasgow Academicals Sevens ==
The club run the Glasgow Academicals Sevens. Their first Sevens tournament was in 1908 to raise funds to pay for their pavilion, but their Sevens was re-started in 1969 as an annual tournament.

== Honours ==
- Scottish Unofficial Championship
  - Champions (14): 1871–72, 1872–73, 1873–74, 1875–76, 1876–77, 1882–83, 1903–04, 1904–05, 1912–13, 1921–22, 1923–24, 1924–25, 1925–26, 1929–30
- Scottish National League Division One
  - Champions (2): 1983–84, 1985–86
- Scottish National League Division Two
  - Champions (4): 1979–80, 1995–96, 2003–04, 2022–23
- Scottish National League Division Three
  - Runners-Up: 2017-18
- Glasgow District 3
  - Champions: 1998-99
- Glasgow District 2
  - Champions: 1999-2000
- Glasgow District 1
  - Champions: 2000-01
- Scottish National League Division Five
  - Champions: 2001-02
- Scottish National League Division Four
  - Champions: 2002-03
- BT Shield
  - Runners-up: 2003-04
- West League
  - Champions: 2015-16
- Glasgow Academicals Sevens
  - Champions: 1971, 1992
- West of Scotland Sevens
  - Champions: 2018, 2019, 2025
- Lochaber Sevens
  - Champions: 1993
- Kelvinside Academicals Sevens
  - Champions: 1976
- Arran Sevens
  - Champions: 2017
- Hillhead HSFP Sevens
  - Champions: 1969
- Glasgow University Sevens
  - Champions: 1941, 1962, 1964, 1969, 1982, 1999
- Clarkston Sevens
  - Champions: 1962, 1964, 1967, 1968, 1969
- Bearsden Sevens
  - Champions: 1977
- Strathendrick Sevens
  - Champions: 1992, 1993
- Allan Glen's Sevens
  - Champions: 1977, 1982, 1986
- Ayr Sevens
  - Champions: 1966, 1969, 1984
- Greenock Sevens
  - Champions: 1976
- Hawick Sevens
  - Champions (1): 1939
- Gala Sevens
  - Champions (1): 1939
- Kilmarnock Sevens
  - Champions: 1942
- Helensburgh Sevens
  - Champions: 2022
- Dundee City Sevens
  - Champions: 2022

== SRU presidents ==
15 Glasgow Academicals have been President of the SRU:

- 1874–75 Albert Harvey
- 1878–79 George Raphael Fleming
- 1880–81 David Watson
- 1882–83 William Cross
- 1884–85 Malcolm Cross
- 1886–87 James S. Carrick
- 1903–04 Robert Greig
- 1911–12 William Andrew Walls
- 1924–25 Robert Campbell MacKenzie
- 1933–34 John MacGill
- 1953–54 Malcolm Allan
- 1956–57 Max Simmers
- 1963–64 Herbert Waddell
- 1969–70 George Crerar
- 1977–78 Frank Coutts

== International players ==
Eighty-four players have played for Scotland, with five also playing tests for the British Lions. The team has also provided internationalists for New Zealand and Sweden.

- (Scotland) JW Arthur (first capped 1871)
- William Davie Brown (first capped 1871) - Scotland captain in 1874-75
- (Scotland) Thomas Chalmers (first capped 1871)
- (Scotland) William Cross (first capped 1871) - scorer of the first ever international conversion SRU President 1882-83
- (Scotland) Daniel Drew (first capped 1871)
- (Scotland) John Shaw Thomson (first capped 1871)

All six of these players played in the first ever rugby international - on 27 March 1871 - when Scotland beat England by 1 goal (2 tries) to nil (1 try).

- (Scotland) James H. McClure (first capped 1872) - with George - the first ever twins to be capped
- (Scotland) Henry William Allan (first capped 1873)
- (Scotland) Charles Chalmers Bryce (first capped 1873)
- (Scotland) George B. McClure (first capped 1873) - with James - the first ever twins to be capped
- (Scotland) Gilbert Heron (first capped 1874)
- (Scotland) John Kennedy Tod (first capped 1874)
- (Scotland) Allan Arthur (first capped 1875)
- (Scotland) Malcolm Cross (first capped 1875) - SRU President 1884-85
- (Scotland) George Raphael Fleming (first capped 1875)
- (Scotland) James S. Carrick (first capped 1876) - SRU President 1886-87
- (Scotland) John Junor (first capped 1876)
- (Scotland) David Watson (first capped 1876) - SRU President 1880-81
- (Scotland) Sir Robert C. McKenzie KBE CB (first capped 1877) - SRU President 1924-25
- (Scotland) Stewart Henry Smith (first capped 1877) - 2 caps
- (Scotland) James A. Campbell (first capped 1878)
- (Scotland) John Alexander Neilson (first capped 1878)
- (Scotland) Gussie Graham (first capped 1878)
- (Scotland) Duncan Irvine (first capped 1878)
- (Scotland) George Macleod (first capped 1878)
- (Scotland) John Blair Brown (first capped 1879)
- (Scotland) Edward Ewart (first capped 1879)
- (Scotland) David McCowan (first capped 1880)
- (Scotland) Bryce Allan (first capped 1881)
- (Scotland) James Fraser (first capped 1881)
- (Scotland) George Robb (first capped 1881)
- (Scotland) William Andrew Walls (first capped 1882) - SRU President 1911-12
- (Scotland) David Kidston (first capped 1883) 2 caps
- (Scotland) John Mowat (first capped 1883)
- (Scotland) J. French (first capped 1886)
- (Scotland) Flowerdew Macindoe (first capped 1886)
- (Scotland) Hugh Ker (first capped 1887)
- (Scotland) Alexander Woodrow (first capped 1887)
- (Scotland) James McKendrick (first capped 1889)
- (Scotland) Robert Greig (first capped 1893) - SRU President 1903-04
- (Scotland) David D. Robertson (first capped 1893) - 1900 Olympic bronze medal for GB at Golf
- (Scotland) James Bishop (first capped 1893)
- (Scotland) Bill Donaldson (first capped 1893)
- (Scotland) Alexander Anderson (first capped 1894)
- (Scotland) Robert Stronach (first capped 1901)
- (Scotland) Lewis MacLeod (first capped 1904)
- (Scotland) William Milne (first capped 1904)
- (Scotland) Harold McCowat (first capped 1905)
- (Scotland) Douglas Schulze (first capped 1905)
- (Scotland) William Russell (first capped 1905)
- (Scotland) Tennant Sloan (first capped 1905)
- (Scotland) (British & Irish Lions) Louis Greig (first capped 1905) - 3 tests for British Lions (SA 1903)
- (Scotland) William Campbell Church (first capped 1906) † killed in WWI (Gallipoli)
- (Scotland) J. A. Brown (first capped 1908)
- (Scotland) Jimmy Dobson (first capped 1910) - 1 cap
- Robert "Bertie" B. Waddell, uncapped by Scotland, toured in 1910 with the "Combined British" squad to Argentina, retrospectively classed as a British Lions tour.
- (Scotland) Alexander Stevenson (first capped 1911)
- (Scotland) John Dobson (first capped 1911) - 6 caps
- (Scotland) Jack Warren (first capped 1914) - 1 cap
- (Scotland) Eric Templeton Young (first capped 1914) - 1 cap † killed in WWI (Gallipoli)
- (Scotland) Robert Gallie (first capped 1920) - 8 caps
- (Scotland) Eric MacKay (first capped 1920) - 2 caps
- (Scotland) George M. Murray (first capped 1921) - 2 caps
- (Scotland) J.C. "Jimmy" Dykes (first capped 1922) - 20 caps.
- (Scotland) Andrew Stevenson (first capped 1922) - 4 caps
- (Scotland) Ronald C. Warren (first capped 1922) - 5 caps
- (Scotland) Robert Simpson (first capped 1923) - 1 cap
- (British & Irish Lions) Herbert Waddell (first capped 1924) - 15 caps for Scotland and 3 tests for British Lions (SA 1924). - SRU President 1963-64
- (Scotland) James Gilchrist (first capped 1925) - 1 cap
- (Scotland) Jimmy Nelson, (first capped 1925) - 25 caps
- (Scotland) William H. Stevenson (first capped 1925) - 1 cap
- (Scotland) Max Simmers, (first capped 1926) - 28 caps - SRU President 1956-57
- (British & Irish Lions) Edward G. Taylor (first capped 1927) - 2 caps for Scotland and 3 tests for British Lions, 1927 "unofficial" tour to Argentina - Argentina's first ever test matches
- (Scotland) Harry Greenlees (first capped 1927) - 6 caps
- Thomas M. Hart (first capped 1930) - 2 caps - also capped twice for Scotland Cricket - 1933-34
- (Scotland) James Forrest (first capped 1932) - 3 caps
- (Scotland) Andrew Dykes (first capped 1932) - 1 cap
- (Scotland) Ronald O. Murray (first capped 1935) - 2 caps
- (British & Irish Lions) Laurie Duff (first capped 1936) - Scotland 6 caps and British Lions (1938 SA Tour - 2 tests, 2 tries)
- (Scotland) William Gibson Biggart (first capped 1943)
- (Scotland) C. Robert Bruce (first capped 1947) - 8 caps
- (Scotland) Frank Coutts (first capped 1947) - 3 caps - SRU President 1977-78
- (Scotland) J. Hamish" C. Dawson (first capped 1947) - 20 caps
- Brian Simmers (first capped 1965) - 7 caps - scorer of two dropped goals in one international (v Wales, 1965) - a record for Scotland held jointly with, among others, John Rutherford, Craig Chalmers and Dan Parks
- (Scotland) Mike A. Smith (first capped 1970) - 4 caps
- (British & Irish Lions) John Beattie (first capped 1980) - 25 caps for Scotland and 2 tests for British Lions (NZ 1983, Rest of the World 1986); member of Scotland's 1984 Grand Slam squad
- (New Zealand) Marty Berry (first capped 1986) - 1 cap - Glasgow Accies' first All Black
- Glenn Metcalfe (first capped 1998) - 40 caps - our most-capped internationalist; member of Scotland's 1999 Championship winning XV
- (Scotland) Johnnie Beattie (first capped 2006) - 38 caps - our most-capped former pupil; scorer of the 2010 6 Nations Try of the Tournament against Ireland
- (Sweden) Andreas Nilserius (first capped 2015) - Swedish cap from Glasgow Accies' 2015-16 Championship-winning squad
- (Sweden) Chris Nilserius (first capped 2016) - Swedish cap from 2015 to 2016 Championship-winning XV, currently playing in Glasgow Accies' 2016-17 1st XV
- (Sweden) Phillip Axelsson (first capped 2016) - Swedish cap currently playing in Glasgow Accies' 2016-17 1st XV
- Robert Beattie (first capped 2016) - won his first cap for Scotland 7s in the Cape Town Sevens in December 2016
