= John MacGill =

Scottish rugby union player

- Born: John MacGill c. 1883 Grangemouth, Scotland
- Died: 20 November 1941 (aged 57–58) Edinburgh, Scotland

Rugby union career
- Position: Full Back
Amateur team(s)
Years	Team	Apps	(Points)
-	Glasgow Academicals		
1916	Glasgow Highlanders (H.L.I.)		
Provincial / State sides
Years	Team	Apps	(Points)
1907	Glasgow District		
1908	Cities District		
Refereeing career
Years	Competition		Apps
1922-30	Scottish Unofficial Championship		
1926	Border League		
1928	Scottish Districts		

54th President of the Scottish Rugby Union
- In office 1933–1934
- Preceded by: Crawford Findlay
- Succeeded by: Mark Coxon Morrison

John MacGill was a Scottish rugby union player. He became a referee and later was the 54th President of the Scottish Rugby Union. His regular playing position was full back.

== Rugby union career ==
=== Amateur career ===
MacGill played for Glasgow Academicals, he usually played at full back; but in the early days of his career he started as a forward.

MacGill played in Glasgow Academicals own sevens competition in 1908.

MacGill played matches for his army battalion. One such match was the 2/9th Highland Light Infantry (Glasgow Highlanders) versus 15th Argyll and Sutherland Highlanders played on 22 January 1916 at Old Anniesland.

=== Provincial career ===
MacGill played for Glasgow District against Edinburgh District in the 1907 inter-city match. The Herald newspaper reports that the Edinburgh back T. Sturrock, the brother of John Sturrock, had a bad game but this was due to the brilliance of MacGill.

MacGill's best chance of pressing for international selection was the Cities District versus Provinces District match in January 1908. MacGill started as full back for Cities.

MacGill's opposite number in the Provinces side Douglas Schulze had a better game and outshone MacGill, although both players played well. One black mark against MacGill was his defending against Alex Purves; on one occasion Purves seemed to slip through his fingers on his way to scoring a try. Schulze and Purves received the Scotland call-ups, not MacGill.

=== Referee career ===
MacGill refereed in the Scottish Unofficial Championship.

MacGill refereed in the Border League.

MacGill refereed the Blues Trial versus Whites Trial match in 1928.

=== Administrative career ===
MacGill was Honorary Secretary of Glasgow Academicals in 1914–15.

MacGill was vice-president of the SRU in 1932. He opened the stand at Jock's Lodge, the home of Royal HSFP that year.

MacGill was elected President of the SRU in 1933.

MacGill was included in the Scotland travelling party to Ireland for their Five Nations Championship match in 1939.

== Outside of rugby ==
MacGill served in the army in the First World War as a captain of the Highland Light Infantry.

MacGill began a career in shipping; first with James Rankine and Son in Glasgow. That company joined with George Gibson & Co. Ltd, a Leith shipping firm, and he became a director of George Gibson & Co. on the merger.

MacGill succeeded R. A. Somerville as a member of the Leith Dock Commission. He represented the Chamber of Shipping as an advisory board member for new works of the Northern Lighthouse Commissioners. He was also on the Forth Conservancy Board representing shipowners.

== Death ==
He died in an Edinburgh nursing home on 20 November 1941.

His estate was worth £48,663.
