= John Mowat (rugby union) =

Scotland international rugby union player

- Born: John Gunn Mowat; 22 January 1859 Glasgow, Scotland
- Died: 1 January 1935 (aged 75) Cleckheaton, England

Rugby union career
- Position: Forward
Amateur team(s)
Years	Team	Apps	(Points)
- Glasgow Academicals
Provincial / State sides
Years	Team	Apps	(Points)
1882	Glasgow District		
International career
Years	Team	Apps	(Points)
1883	Scotland	2	(0)

Sir John Mowat (January 22, 1859 – January 1, 1935) was a Scotland international rugby union player.

== Rugby Union career ==
=== Amateur career ===
He was schooled at Glasgow Academy.

He played as a forward for Glasgow Academicals.

In the 1882–83 season, the Academicals won the Scottish Unofficial Championship jointly with the West of Scotland.

=== Provincial career ===
He also represented Glasgow District against Edinburgh District on 2 December 1882 match.

=== International career ===
He was capped twice by Scotland in 1883.

== Business career ==
He became associated with the S. Law and Sons who ran the Moorland Mills in Cleckheaton. He became Chairman of the English Card Clothing Syndicate.

== Law career ==
He was made a Justice of the Peace for the West Riding area.

== Charity work ==
He was a benefactor of many Yorkshire charities.

He donated to Bradford Infirmary and the Yorkshire Cancer Campaign Fund.

He donated a library to Spenborough valued at £20,000 at the time.

He assisted the local Yorkshire European War Committee Fund during the Great War.

== Politics ==
He was a one-time President of the Spen Valley Liberal Association.

== Knighthood ==
He was given a knighthood. He was made a baronet in 1932 due to his public services in the West Riding of Yorkshire.

== Family ==
He was a son of Baillie John Mowat of Glasgow.

His heir was Lieutenant Colonel Alfred Law Mowat. Mowat lost his younger son John Graham Mowat in the Great War.

== Death ==
Mowat died in 1935 leaving an estate of £201,535, 15 shillings and 3 pence.
