= Gossman =

Gossman is a surname. Notable people with the surname include:

- Brian Gossman (1951–2022), Scottish rugby union player
- F. Joseph Gossman (1930–2013), American Roman Catholic bishop
- Jimmy Gossman (born 1955), Scottish rugby union player
- Lionel Gossman (1929–2021), Scottish-American scholar of French literature
