= Crawford Findlay =

Scottish rugby union player & referee

- Born: James Crawford Findlay; 2 June 1871 Govan, Scotland
- Notable relative(s): Graham Findlay, brother

Rugby union career
- Position: Three Quarters
Amateur team(s)
Years	Team	Apps	(Points)
-	West of Scotland		
Refereeing career
Years	Competition		Apps
1895	Scottish Unofficial Championship		
1902-11	Home Nations		

53rd President of the Scottish Rugby Union
- In office 1932–1933
- Preceded by: John Sturrock
- Succeeded by: John MacGill

Crawford Findlay was a Scottish rugby union player. He became an international rugby union referee. He later was the 53rd President of the Scottish Rugby Union.

== Rugby Union career ==
=== Amateur career ===
Findlay was playing for West of Scotland but a knee injury in 1895 forced him to go to a specialist in London.

=== Referee career ===
For the season 1895-96 Findlay started refereeing. He was refereeing in the Scottish Unofficial Championship. Reports state he gave 'every satisfaction' as a referee. He was still refereeing that league in 1898.

Findlay was nicknamed the 'Penalty King' as he frequently gave penalties for infringements that other referees would overlook.

When refereeing the England versus Wales match in 1904, after Findlay gave numerous penalties for scrum infringements, the Welsh scrum half, Swansea player Dicky Owen, gave the ball to the English scrum half to feed the scrum on Welsh put-ins.

Some Welsh felt that Findlay carried 'social prejudice' against them: Findlay had previously made a comment about the number of Welsh working men playing rugby union instead of rugby league. The Welsh centre Rhys Gabe said that Findlay told him that he was surprised that the Welsh picked the working class of miners, steelworkers and policemen and felt they should join the Northern Union instead.

On a particularly foggy day when it was difficult to see the posts, Findlay was refereeing the match between Oxford University and Cambridge University at the end of the 1907–08 season. The match was tied at the end of the game and the Scots centre K. G. MacLeod, playing for Cambridge, tried a last-gasp drop kick to win the match. Findlay could not see the posts or where the ball went. He asked MacLeod how his kick went. MacLeod replied 'No goal'. He felt the ball swerved just outside.

=== Administrative career ===
When his brother Graham Findlay was promoted to President of West of Scotland in 1894, Crawford was then elected as secretary.

He was re-appointed secretary of the West of Scotland in 1898.

He moved to the board of London Scottish in 1931.

He was elected vice-president of the SRU in May 1931. Findlay was then elected President of the Scottish Rugby Union the following year in May 1932.

As SRU president he opened the Watsonians grandstand in 1933.

== Law career ==
Findlay went to the University of Glasgow where he got his MA in 1891 and studied law and received his LLD in 1894.
