= Henry Menzies (rugby union) =

Scotland international rugby union player

- Born: Henry Fisher Menzies; 15 June 1867 London, Ontario, Canada
- Died: 31 July 1938 (aged 71) Edinburgh, Scotland

Rugby union career
Amateur team(s)
Years	Team	Apps	(Points)
- Fettesian-Lorettonians
- Edinburgh University
- West of Scotland
Provincial / State sides
Years	Team	Apps	(Points)
1891	Glasgow District		
1892	Cities District		
1893	West of Scotland District		
International career
Years	Team	Apps	(Points)
1893-94	Scotland	4	

Henry Fisher Menzies (15 June 1867 in London, Ontario, Canada – 31 July 1938 in Edinburgh) was a Scotland international rugby union player. Born in Canada to a Greenock father, he moved to Scotland with his mother as a child and was brought up in Perthshire. Educated at Fettes College in Edinburgh, he went on to be a teacher.

== Rugby Union career ==
=== Amateur career ===
After studying at Fettes College, he played rugby for Fettesian-Lorettonians.

He went to Edinburgh University and then played for their rugby team. He graduated in 1889.

He then played for West of Scotland.

=== Provincial career ===
He played for Glasgow District in the 1891 inter-city match against Edinburgh District on 5 December of that year.

He played for Cities District against Anglo-Scots on 24 December 1892.

He played for West of Scotland District against East of Scotland District on 21 January 1893.

=== International career ===
Henry played four times for Scotland.

His debut was on 4 February 1893 against Wales.

== Teaching career ==
He was appointed a Master at Aberdeen Grammar School. It was in Aberdeen that he married his wife, Margaret Crombie, on 12 August 1896.

Menzies moved from Aberdeen to become a Rector of Wallace Hall academy in Dumfries-shire. He was there for over 30 years until he retired.
