= James Veitch (rugby union) =

Scotland international rugby union player

- Born: James Pringle Veitch; 16 September 1862 Penicuik, Scotland
- Died: 22 January 1917 (aged 54) Blackburn, England

Rugby union career
- Position: Full Back
Amateur team(s)
Years	Team	Apps	(Points)
- Royal HSFP
Provincial / State sides
Years	Team	Apps	(Points)
1881-83	Edinburgh District		
1882-86	East of Scotland District		
International career
Years	Team	Apps	(Points)
1882-86	Scotland	8	

James Veitch (1862-1917) was a Scotland international rugby union player.

== Rugby Union career ==
=== Amateur career ===
He played for Royal HSFP.

=== Provincial career ===
He played for Edinburgh District in the 1883 inter-city match.

He played for East of Scotland District in the 30 January 1886 match against West of Scotland District.

=== International career ===
He was capped 8 times for Scotland in the period 1882 to 1886.

== Family ==
He was born to Agnes Pringle and Andrew Veitch.
