= John Millar (rugby union) =

Scotland international rugby union player

- Born: John Neill Millar; 9 March 1873 Paisley, Scotland
- Died: 9 November 1921 (aged 48) Paisley, [Scotland
- Notable relative(s): Alexander Woodrow, brother in law

Rugby union career
- Position: Forward
Amateur team(s)
Years	Team	Apps	(Points)
- West of Scotland
Provincial / State sides
Years	Team	Apps	(Points)
- Glasgow District
- Cities District
- West of Scotland District
International career
Years	Team	Apps	(Points)
1892-895	Scotland	6	(0)

John Millar (9 March 1873 – 9 November 1921) was a Scotland international rugby union player.

== Rugby union career ==
As an amateur, Millar played for West of Scotland. He then played for Glasgow District against Edinburgh District in the 17 December 1892 Inter-City match. This was in the middle of an unbeaten spell in the Inter-City for Glasgow; and Glasgow District won the match by 1 goal & 1 try to 3 tries (in an era when goals were predominate over tries). He also played for Cities District against Anglo-Scots in the 24 December 1892 match. In their match against East of Scotland District on 21 January 1893, Millar played for West of Scotland District. In total, he played matches for Scotland. Additionally, he was a member of the Triple Crown winning team of 1895.

== Business career ==
Millar was a yarn merchant in Paisley at James Millar and Son.

== Family ==
John Millar was born to James Millar (1846-1894) and Agnes Dunlop Neill (1848-1934). They had 3 daughters and 2 sons, including John.

He married Jane Sarah Parsella Woodrow in 1897 in Hillhead in Glasgow. Jane was the sister of Scotland international rugby union player Alexander Woodrow.

He and Jane had two daughters: Marjorie Thelma Woodrow Millar (1898-1967) and Mary Estelle Millar.

== Death ==
The Scotsman newspaper of 11 November 1921 had this on his funeral arrangement:

At Makerston, Paisley, suddenly, on 9 th inst. John Neill Millar, elder son of the late James Millar of Cruickston Hall, and deeply loved husband of Jean S. Woodrow. Funeral at Woodside Cemetery on Saturday 12th inst; at 2.30pm. This is the only intimation and invitation.

The Dundee Courier of the same date had a little more:

The death has occurred of Mr John Nelll Millar, Paisley, who received his International cap as a rugby player early in his career and took part in many of the most important matches.

The value of his estate at death was recorded as £7422, 17 shillings and 1 penny.
