= Thomas Begbie =

Scotland international rugby union player

- Born: Thomas Allan Begbie; 1 August 1862 Dirleton, Scotland
- Died: 26 February 1896 (aged 33) London, England

Rugby union career
- Position: Full back
Amateur team(s)
Years	Team	Apps	(Points)
1880-81	Edinburgh Wanderers		
1881	Glasgow Academicals		
1881	Edinburgh Wanderers		
1884	Merchistonians		
Provincial / State sides
Years	Team	Apps	(Points)
1880	Edinburgh District		
1881	East of Scotland District		
International career
Years	Team	Apps	(Points)
1881	Scotland	2	((1 goal))

Thomas Begbie (1862-1896) was a Scotland international rugby union player. His regular playing position was Fullback.

== Rugby Union career ==
=== Amateur career ===
Begbie played for Edinburgh Wanderers.

In 1881 Begbie moved to play for Glasgow Academicals.

That same year Begbie went back to playing for Edinburgh Wanderers.

In 1884 Begbie was playing for Merchistonians.

=== Provincial career ===
Begbie played for Edinburgh District in the 1880 inter-city match against Glasgow District. He scored a try and conversion in the match.

Begbie played for East of Scotland District in the February 1881 match against West of Scotland District.

=== International career ===
Begbie was capped twice for Scotland in 1881.

== Business career ==
Begbie became a merchant; and was named as such on his death in the probate calendar of 1896. His estate was valued at £7259, 0 shillings, and 5 pence.

== Family ==
Begbie's parents were Thomas Begbie (1816-1878) and Christina Stodart Aitchison (1824-1864). He had two brothers: George Begbie (1857-1888) and John Aitchison Begbie (1859-1907). He married Hetty; she re-married, after Thomas's death in 1896 in Hampstead, to George Theodore Born of London on 11 June 1898.

John Aitchison Begbie also played for Edinburgh Wanderers.
