= David Morton (rugby union) =

Scotland international rugby union player

- Born: David Simson Morton; 23 July 1861 Glasgow, Scotland
- Died: 7 May 1937 (aged 75) Glasgow, Scotland

Rugby union career
- Position: Forward
Amateur team(s)
Years	Team	Apps	(Points)
-	West of Scotland		
Provincial / State sides
Years	Team	Apps	(Points)
1886	Glasgow District		
International career
Years	Team	Apps	(Points)
1887-90	Scotland	9	(3)
Refereeing career
Years	Competition		Apps
1891-92	Scottish Districts		
1891-92	Scottish Unofficial Championship		
1893	Home Nations		

20th President of the Scottish Rugby Union
- In office 1892–1893
- Preceded by: Thomas Ainslie
- Succeeded by: Leslie Balfour-Melville

David Morton (23 July 1861 – 7 May 1937) was a Scotland international rugby union player. After his playing career, he became a rugby union referee.

== Rugby Union career ==
=== Amateur career ===
He played as a forward for West of Scotland.

=== Provincial career ===
He represented Glasgow District against Edinburgh District in 1886.

=== International career ===
Morton was capped for Scotland from 1887; and played in 4 Home Nation Championships; the last being in 1890. Making 9 appearances, he scored 3 tries - this was an era when scoring a try only earned a single point.

=== Referee career ===
Morton refereed in the Scottish Unofficial Championship in 1891.

He refereed the Inter-City match between Glasgow District and Edinburgh District in 1891 and 1892.

He refereed in the match between Wales and England in the 1893 Home Nations tournament.

=== Administrative career ===
Morton became the 20th President of the Scottish Rugby Union. He served the 1892-93 term in office.
