= Robert Simpson (rugby union) =

Scotland international rugby union player

- Born: Robert S. Simpson Scotland

Rugby union career
- Position: Flanker
Amateur team(s)
Years	Team	Apps	(Points)
1919-23	Glasgow Academicals		
1923	Manchester		
1927-28	Bristol RFC		
1928	→ Glasgow Academicals		
Provincial / State sides
Years	Team	Apps	(Points)
1921	Glasgow District		
1922	Scotland Possibles		
International career
Years	Team	Apps	(Points)
1923	Scotland	1	

Robert Simpson was a Scotland international rugby union player.

== Rugby Union career ==
=== Amateur career ===
Simpson played for Glasgow Academicals from 1919. He captained Glasgow Academicals from the 1920-21 season till the end of the 1922-23 season.

The Glasgow Academical Club Centenary Volume states this of Simpson:

1920-21 was the first of three consecutive seasons in which the side was captained by Bobby Simpson. He was an extraordinarily gifted athlete who could play almost anywhere on the field, and there is no doubt that the club owes much to his great leadership over this period.

Glasgow Academicals won the 1921-22 season Scottish Unofficial Championship under Simpson's captaincy.

He played for Manchester RFC, from the season start in 1923 to December of that year, in preparation of moving to Burma. While in Manchester he suffered a concussion playing in their match against Liverpool University and was taken to hospital.

He moved to Burma for work, but in 1927 returned. The Civil & Military Gazette (Lahore) of Monday 19 December 1927 recorded:

R. S. Simpson, who some years ago was a valuable member of the Glasgow Academicals Rugby side before going to Burma, has now returned home. He is going to reside in the south-west of England and will in all likelihood turn out for the Bristol club.

After moving to the south west of England from Burma, he joined Bristol RFC. He returned to Scotland for around a month, around mid February to mid March in 1928, and during that time he again played for Glasgow Academicals. He then returned to Bristol to finish the season with the club.

=== Provincial career ===
He captained Glasgow District in the 1921 inter-city match. No fewer than 10 Glasgow Academical players were in the side.

He played for Scotland Possibles in the first trial match of the 1922-23 season.

=== International career ===
His first match for Scotland came in the 24 February 1923 international match against Ireland.

The Dundee Evening Telegraph of Friday 23 February 1923 stated:

In promoting R. S. Simpson, of Glasgow Academicals, to international rank, the Scottish Union selectors have earned popularity with, a large section of the Rugby public.

== Business career ==
The Chairman of the Burma Oil Company, Sir John Cargill, 1st Baronet, was an ex-player of Glasgow Academicals. As captain of the Academicals this gave Simpson a great contact for employment.

He worked for the Burma Oil Company.

== Other interests ==
Simpson played tennis to a decent level. He played for Pollokshields on his return to Scotland after his stint in Bristol. He played doubles, partnering Willie Wiseman, the former Scotland and Queens Park footballer. In their final match they played against J. T. Hill who played for Glasgow HSFP and his brother A. W. Hill.

The Sunday Post of Sunday 03 June 1928 reported on their West of Scotland final match.

An Interesting Partnership. AN interesting tennis partnership was seen in the final of the West of Scotland section of the Scottish Cup, when R. S. Simpson and W. Wiseman represented the Pollokshields club. Simpson the ex- Glasgow Accies Rugby player, who was capped for Scotland in 1923, and Willie Wiseman is Queen’s Park’s left back and captain also an Internationalist. J. T. Hill, of the Newlands side, which defeated Simpson and Wiseman, is probably better known the Glasgow High School F.P.’s stand-off half.
