= Harold McCowat =

Scotland international rugby union player

- Born: Robert Harold McCowat; 30 April 1882 Durban, Colony of Natal
- Died: 20 March 1956 (aged 73) Johannesburg, South Africa

Rugby union career
- Position: Wing
Amateur team(s)
Years	Team	Apps	(Points)
- Glasgow Academicals
Provincial / State sides
Years	Team	Apps	(Points)
1904	Glasgow District		
1905	Cities District		
International career
Years	Team	Apps	(Points)
1905	Scotland	1	(0)

Harold McCowat (30 April 1882 – 20 March 1956) was a Scotland international rugby union player.

== Rugby Union career ==
=== Amateur career ===
He played for Glasgow Academicals.

He was in the side that won the Scottish Unofficial Championship of 1903–04 season; and 1904–5 season; and shared the 1902–03 season with Edinburgh University.

=== Provincial career ===
He played for Glasgow District in 1904 inter-city match. McCowat was due to play for the Provinces against the Cities District in 1905, but he was promoted to the Cities District side.

=== International career ===
He was capped for Scotland only the once, in 1905. This was in the 1905 Five Nations Championship match against Ireland.

McCowat was noted for his speed. The London Evening Standard of 9 February 1905 noting in the preview to the Ireland match:

McCowat vies with Burt-Marshall of Fettes, for the honour of the fastest wing three in Scotland. He is a splendid runner, and possesses the splendid faculty of always going straight for the line.

== Other sports ==
In the West of Scotland Harriers Athletics Event of 1903 at Celtic Park, McCowat representing Glasgow Academicals ran the 120 yard hurdles in the Open event. It was a handicap race and McCowat gave the other competitors as much as a 16 yards and 1 foot advantage. His main rival Murray was giving an advantage of 10 yards and 2 feet. It was reported that McCowat and Murray were neck and neck 4 hurdles from home, McCowat having already made up the difference, but only secured the victory on the line by a few inches.
