= William Milne =

William Milne may refer to:

- William Milne (missionary) (1785–1822), British Protestant missionary to China
- Sir William Milne (politician) (1822–1895), South Australian wine merchant and politician
- William Milne (sport shooter) (born 1852), British sport shooter
- William J. Milne (educator) (1843–1914), American educator and administrator
- William Johnstone Milne (1892–1917), Canadian soldier
- William Milne (rugby union), Scottish rugby union player
- Billy Milne (1895–1975), Scottish footballer
- Willie Milne (1951–2023), Scottish golfer
- William Grant Milne (?–1866), Scottish botanist
- William Charles Milne, missionary to China
- Ross Milne (Canadian politician) (William Ross Milne), Canadian politician
- Sandy Milne (William Alexander Milne, born 1920), Scottish nationalist politician
