= Alexander Woodrow =

Scotland international rugby union player

- Born: Alexander Norie Woodrow; 13 November 1867 Glasgow, Scotland
- Died: 26 February 1916 (aged 48) Glasgow, Scotland
- School: Merchiston Castle School
- Notable relative(s): John Millar, brother in law

Rugby union career
- Position: Three Quarters
Amateur team(s)
Years	Team	Apps	(Points)
- Glasgow Academicals
Provincial / State sides
Years	Team	Apps	(Points)
1886	Glasgow District		
1887	West of Scotland District		
International career
Years	Team	Apps	(Points)
1887	Scotland	3	

Alexander Woodrow (13 November 1867 – 26 February 1916) was a Scotland international rugby union player.

== Rugby Union career ==
=== Amateur career ===
He went to Merchiston Castle School in Edinburgh. The Athletic News newspaper called the school 'one the finest - if not the finest - football nurseries in Scotland' and that Woodrow's rugby union ability was 'bred and reared' there.

Woodrow played rugby union for Glasgow Academicals.

=== Provincial career ===
He played for Glasgow District in their inter-city match against Edinburgh District on 4 December 1886.

He played for West of Scotland District in their match against East of Scotland District on 19 January 1887.

=== International career ===
Woodrow was capped 3 times by Scotland, all in 1887.

At the end of the 1887–88 season it became known that Woodrow would retire from rugby union. A rumour started - and reported in the Glasgow Evening Post newspaper - that he would instead play association football with Queens Park the following season.

=== Administrative career ===
He became a non-playing member of the West of Scotland and then served on the club committee. His sister Jane Sarah Parsella Woodrow had married the Scotland international and West of Scotland rugby union player John Millar and this influenced Woodrow's allegiances.

== Outside of rugby union ==
He played cricket for Merchiston Castle School.

After rugby union, Woodrow became a lithographic printer. He owned a business with his father based at 75 Glassford Street in Glasgow. The rugby union player died on 28 February 1916 and was buried in the Glasgow Necropolis. The value of his estate at death was £4814; 0 shillings; and 4 pence. His son Alexander Woodrow Junior was granted confirmation for the estate.

The rugby union player predeceased his father. Woodrow's father, also Alexander Woodrow, died later that year on 7 October 1916 in Ayr. As the head of the Alexander Woodrow & Son lithographic printing and engraving business he left a larger estate of £76,271; 8 shillings; and 3 pence. Again, his grandson and the international rugby union player's son, Alexander Woodrow Junior (also a lithographic printer), was sadly granted confirmation of the estate.

The only son of Alexander Woodrow, the aforementioned Alexander Woodrow Junior, was also a promising rugby union player. However while playing for Loretto School against Edinburgh Academy he received a 'severe blow on the head' in 1910. He was taken to Edinburgh's Royal Infimary where he was treated for concussion; and then had to recover further in Dr. Stile's nursing home.
