= Bill Burnet =

- Full name: William Alexander Burnet
- Born: 8 July 1912 Pollokshields, Glasgow, Scotland
- Died: 19 August 2001 (aged 89) Helensburgh, Dumbartonshire, Scotland

Rugby union career
- Position: Second-row
International career
Years	Team	Apps	(Points)
1934–36	Scotland	8	(0)

William Alexander Burnet (8 July 1912 — 19 August 2001) was a Scottish international rugby union player.

Burnet was born in Pollokshields and educated at Loretto School.

A forward, Burnet played for West of Scotland and was captain of Fettesian-Lorettonian.

Burnet gained eight Scotland caps, debuting against Wales at Murrayfield for his only appearance in 1934, before being a team regular over the next two years. One of his caps was against the 1935–36 All Blacks.

== See also ==
- List of Scotland national rugby union players
