= E. T. Burke =

British doctor

Edmund Tytler Burke
- Born: 18 April 1888; Elgin, Scotland
- Died: 14 June 1941 (aged 53); Paignton, England
- Occupation: Medical doctor
- Known for: Work with Venereal Disease

Lieutenant Colonel Edmund Tytler Burke, DSO, MB, ChB (18 April 1888 – 14 June 1941) was a British doctor of medicine who fought in World War I and "was one of England's outstanding authorities on venereal diseases".

Burke was born in Elgin, Scotland on 18 April 1888 and was educated at Perth Academy and the University of Glasgow and University of St. Andrews.

Burke graduated from the University of Glasgow and was a member of the Special Reserve of the Royal Army Medical Corps from 1913. During his wartime service, he was decorated with the Distinguished Service Order and the Serbian Order of the White Eagle with Swords and was also mentioned in despatches. When he finished his military service, he had attained the rank of lieutenant colonel.

By the late 1930s, Burke was an assistant editor of the British Journal of Venereal Diseases, Director of the Whitechapel Clinic (now the Ambrose King Centre), consultant venereologist and he had published papers in the British Medical Journal and elsewhere. By the time of his death in 1941 (or shortly before), Burke had been Consultant Venereologist in the Public Health Department of the London County Council and Lecturer in Venereal Diseases in the London Hospital Medical College, University of London.

Burke died on 14 June 1941 at Paignton, Devon, England where he was a volunteer with the 10th Devon (Torbay) Battalion of the Home Guard.
