= George Turnbull (rugby union) =

Scotland international rugby union player

- Born: George Oliver Turnbull; 21 July 1877 Colinton Mains, Edinburgh, Scotland
- Died: 14 January 1970 (aged 92) Brighton, England

Rugby union career
- Position: Forward
Amateur team(s)
Years	Team	Apps	(Points)
- West of Scotland
–	Edinburgh Wanderers		
Provincial / State sides
Years	Team	Apps	(Points)
1895	Glasgow District		
1895	Cities District		
1896	Schoolboy		
1903	Anglo-Scots		
International career
Years	Team	Apps	(Points)
1896-1904	Scotland	5	(3)

George Turnbull (21 July 1877 – 14 January 1970) was a Scotland international rugby union player.

== Rugby Union career ==
=== Amateur career ===
Turnbull played for West of Scotland.

He later played for Edinburgh Wanderers.

=== Provincial career ===
He played for Glasgow District in their inter-city match against Edinburgh District on 7 December 1895.

Turnbull played for Cities District in their match against Provinces District on 28 December 1895.

He played for a Schoolboy side against the Scotland Probables on Wednesday 23 January 1896.

He played for the Anglo-Scots against the South of Scotland District on 26 December 1903.

=== International career ===
Turnbull played for Scotland 5 times, from 1896 to 1904.

== Military career ==
He joined the British Army in India and was a captain of the 26th Punjabis.
