= Andrew Stevenson (rugby union) =

Scotland international rugby union player

- Born: Andrew Kirkwood Stevenson; 14 March 1897 Glasgow, Scotland
- Died: 18 June 1968 (aged 71) Milngavie, Scotland

Rugby union career
- Position: Prop
Amateur team(s)
Years	Team	Apps	(Points)
- Glasgow Academicals
Provincial / State sides
Years	Team	Apps	(Points)
- Glasgow District
International career
Years	Team	Apps	(Points)
1922-23	Scotland	4	(0)

Andrew Stevenson (14 March 1897 – 18 June 1968) was a Scotland international rugby union player. He played at the Prop position.

== Rugby Union career ==
=== Amateur career ===
He played for Glasgow Academicals

=== Provincial career ===
He played for Glasgow District in the inter-city match against Edinburgh District on 2 December 1922.

=== International career ===
Stevenson was capped for Scotland 4 times.

He made his international debut against France in the Five Nations match on 2 January 1922 at Colombes.

He played in 3 Five Nation matches the following season:- against France, Wales and England.
