= John Sturrock (rugby union) =

Scottish rugby union player & referee

- Born: John Chesser Sturrock; 1 November 1880 Dalkeith, Scotland
- Died: 6 May 1940 (aged 59) Edinburgh, Scotland

Rugby union career
- Position: Forward
Amateur team(s)
Years	Team	Apps	(Points)
-	Royal HSFP		
Refereeing career
Years	Competition		Apps
1906	Border League		
1914-29	Scottish Unofficial Championship		
1921-22	Five Nations Championship		

52nd President of the Scottish Rugby Union
- In office 1931–1932
- Preceded by: Andrew Balfour
- Succeeded by: Crawford Findlay

John Sturrock (1 November 1880 - 6 May 1940) was a Scottish rugby union player. He became an international rugby union referee. He later became the 52nd President of the Scottish Rugby Union.

== Rugby Union career ==
=== Amateur career ===
Sturrock played for Royal HSFP. In a Royal High Sports Day in 1898, he won the 300 yards dash with a time of 33 and 1/5 seconds.

=== Referee career ===
Sturrock referred in the Border League in 1906.

He refereed in the Scottish Unofficial Championship in 1914 and in 1929.

Sturrock refereed the 1921 England versus Wales match; and the France versus England match that same year. In 1922, he refereed the Wales versus Ireland match.

=== Administrative career ===
He was a committee member of Royal HSFP in 1909.

He gave a speech in 1927 on behalf of the Scottish Rugby Union at the Edinburgh Borderers rugby club dinner on the scarcity of referees in Scotland. He stated it was nearly 25 years since he had become a referee and he would likely continue this until he dropped dead on the field. He was nearer 50 than 40. He urged players on the edge of retiring from the game to take up refereeing. In his experience those retiring players tried refereeing for a few weeks and then dropped it. He stated that clubs would try to take advantage of a young referee. He advised those inexperienced referees to take charge of the game in the first 5 minutes and this should prevent trouble for the rest of the match.

He was appointed Vice-President of the Scottish Rugby Union in 1930.

He was President of the Scottish Rugby Union for the period 1931 to 1932.

He was elected a Special Representative of the SRU in 1933.

== Outside of rugby ==
Sturrock was a solicitor. His father, Thomas Sturrock was also a solicitor and also on the Dalkeith Town Council. His father died and Sturrock took over his father's business alongside his brother with the name T. & J. C. Sturrock.

He was appointed his father's successor on the Dalkeith Town Council.

He was made Justice of the Peace on 22 March 1939.

== Death ==
Sturrock died in an Edinburgh Nursing Home. In the month prior he was advised to take a rest from his duties by his doctor; and was admitted to the nursing home only a week before his death.
