= 1894–95 Scottish Districts season =

Rugby union competition

- Countries: Scotland
- Date: 1894–95
- Matches played: 1

The 1894–95 Scottish Districts season is a record of all the rugby union matches for Scotland's district teams.

== History ==
The scoring was tweaked again this season, to give greater emphasis on try-scoring. A 'goal' - a try and conversion - remained 5 points; but the try was now greater value than the conversion (3pts to 2pts).

Glasgow District beat Edinburgh District in the Inter-City match. The gate money was estimated at £150. The Scottish Referee noted that it was unfortunate that Glasgow District's and West of Scotland FC's player Charles Nicholl was not eligible for Scotland.

The North of Scotland v South of Scotland match was called off due to the frost.

== Results ==
Date	Try	Conversion	Penalty	Dropped goal	Goal from mark	Notes
1894–1904	3 points	2 points	3 points	4 points	4 points	

=== Inter-City ===
1 December 1894

Glasgow District	10 - 6	Edinburgh District
Try: W. R. Gibson; Thomson; Con: George Neilson x 2	Report	Try: Welsh; Gibson

Hamilton Crescent, Glasgow
Referee: Graham Findlay

Glasgow District:
Edinburgh District:

8 December 1894

Glasgow District	-	South of Scotland District
	Preview

Glasgow District:
South of Scotland District:

8 December 1894

Edinburgh District	-	North of Scotland District
	Preview; Preview

Holborn Cricket Grounds

Edinburgh District:
North of Scotland District:

=== Other Scottish matches ===
28 December 1894

Provinces District	5-3	Cities District
	Report; Report

Merchiston Castle grounds

Provinces:
Cities:

=== English matches ===
No other District matches played.

=== International matches ===
No touring matches this season.
