= Hugh Ker =

Scotland international rugby union player

- Born: Hugh Torrance Ker; 23 June 1865 Partick, Scotland
- Died: 19 March 1938 (aged 72) Rye, England

Rugby union career
- Position: Forward
Amateur team(s)
Years	Team	Apps	(Points)
- Glasgow Academicals
Provincial / State sides
Years	Team	Apps	(Points)
1886-89	West of Scotland District		
1886-88	Glasgow District		
International career
Years	Team	Apps	(Points)
1887-90	Scotland	7	

Hugh Torrance Ker (23 June 1865 – 19 March 1938) was a Scotland international rugby union player.

== Rugby Union career ==
=== Amateur career ===
Ker played for Glasgow Academicals.

=== Provincial career ===
Ker played for West of Scotland District against East of Scotland District on 30 January 1886. He also played in the corresponding 29 January 1887 fixture. He missed the 1888 fixture but was back in the West District side for the 26 January 1889 fixture.

Ker played for Glasgow District in the inter-city match against Edinburgh District on 4 December 1886, scoring the only try in Glasgow's win over Edinburgh. He played in the 3 December 1887 inter-city match, and in the 1 December 1888 inter-city.

=== International career ===
Ker was capped 7 times for Scotland in the period 1887 to 1890.

== Engineering career ==
Ker became a civil engineer and was proposed to join the Institute of Civil Engineers on 26 October 1890 by a Mr. Strain. His Form E acceptance of the rules of the Institution was signed by Ker on 19 December 1902.

In the First World War he joined the Royal Engineers and was made a captain.

Ker was made a Temporary Honorary Lieutenant Colonel on 1 May 1919.

== Family ==
Ker's father was William Ker and his mother was Caroline Agnes (Paton) Ker.

Ker married Lillias Margaret Marten in Petersham, Surrey, in 1891. They had 2 children.

== Death ==
Ker died in Durrant House in Rye. His personal estate was valued at £14, 594.
