= Jimmy Nelson (rugby union, born 1903) =

Scotland rugby union player (1903–1981)

- Born: James Benzie Nelson; 9 February 1903 Glasgow, Scotland
- Died: 16 October 1981 (aged 78) Inverness, Scotland

Rugby union career
- Position: Scrum-half
Amateur team(s)
Years	Team	Apps	(Points)
- Glasgow Academicals
Provincial / State sides
Years	Team	Apps	(Points)
- Glasgow District
International career
Years	Team	Apps	(Points)
1925-31	Scotland	25	(6)

Jimmy Nelson (9 February 1903 – 16 October 1981) was a Scotland international rugby union player.

== Rugby Union career ==
=== Amateur career ===
He played for Glasgow Academicals.

=== Provincial career ===
He was capped for Glasgow District.

=== International career ===
He was capped 25 times for Scotland.
