= Order of the White Eagle (Serbia) =

Royal Order of the Kingdom of Serbia and the Kingdom of Yugoslavia

Order of the White Eagle Орден Белог орла
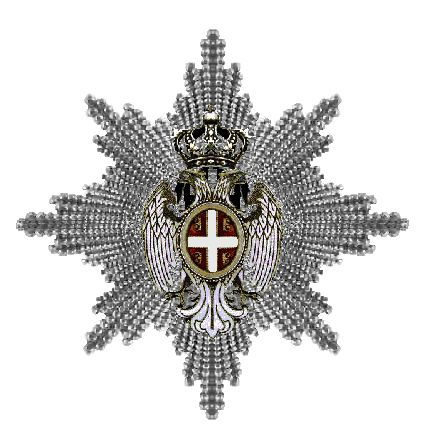
- Star of the order
- Type: State order (1883–1945); Dynastic order (since 1945)
- Awarded for: Peace or wartime merit or significant services rendered to the Crown, State and Nation.
- Presented by: Kingdom of Serbia; Kingdom of Yugoslavia; House of Karađorđević
- Eligibility: Serbian/Yugoslav citizens and foreign nationals.
- Established: 23 January 1883
- First award: 1883
- Grand Cross with swords Great officer with swords Commander with swords Officer with swords Cavalier with swords

Precedence
- Next (higher): Order of St. Prince Lazar (1883–98); Order of Miloš the Great (1898–1903); Order of Karađorđe's Star (after 1903)
- Next (lower): Order of the Cross of Takovo (before 1903); Order of St. Sava (1903–1945); Order of the Yugoslav Crown (Kingdom of Yugoslavia, 1930–1945)

The Order of the White Eagle (Serbian: Орден Белог орла, romanized: Orden Belog orla) was a state order in the Kingdom of Serbia (1883–1918) and the Kingdom of Yugoslavia (1918–1945).

It continues as a dynastic order, with appointments currently made by Alexander, Crown Prince of Yugoslavia.

== History ==
King Milan I of Serbia instituted the Order of the White Eagle on 23 January 1883, concurrently with the Order of St. Sava. The Order had five classes and was conferred on Serbian and Yugoslav citizens for achievements in peace or war, or for special merits to the Crown, the state and nation. In the period between 1883 and 1898 Order of the White Eagle was the highest award in the Kingdom of Serbia. In 1898 the Royal Order of Miloš the Great took precedence over the White Eagle and in 1904 the former was replaced by the Order of Karađorđe's Star.

After his accession to the throne in 1903, King Peter I of Serbia continued awarding the Order of the White Eagle, but the reverse of the medallion had the year of the proclamation of the Kingdom (1883) instead of the cipher of Milan I.

The white eagle with wings displayed was re-established as the State Arms of Serbia, symbol descended from the Emperors of Byzantium. The order had a War Merit Division, with crossed swords between the Royal Crown and eagle's heads, that was introduced in 1915, and conferred for conspicuous bravery of the officers in the field.

In 1945, with the end of the monarchy, the order was in effect exiled. Since the end of Yugoslavia, the Royal Order continues to be awarded by Alexander, Crown Prince of Yugoslavia, as the senior representative of the Crown. His awards include Angelo de Mojana di Cologna, Grand Master of the Sovereign Military Order of Malta, and posthumous conferment upon three Crown Council Members. On 22 August 2016, Prince Alexander awarded the Grand Cross of the Order to husbands of three princesses of the royal family, Sir George Desmond Lorenz de Silva, a former United Nations War Crimes Prosecutor, Mr Gregory Thune-Larsen, and Mr Austin Prichard-Levy.

== Description ==
The Order of the White Eagle has five degrees, and can be awarded with swords for the military services, with or without swords for civil merit. The Order is organized into five classes:

- 1st Class – Grand Cross
- 2nd Class – Grand Officer's Cross
- 3rd Class – Commander's Cross
- 4th Class – Officer's Cross
- 5th Class – Knight's Cross

The sash of the Order is worn from the left shoulder to the right hip.

== Recipients ==
List of recipients by class

Grand Masters

- Milan I of Serbia
- Alexander I of Serbia
- Peter I of Serbia
- Alexander I of Yugoslavia
- Peter II of Yugoslavia

Grand Crosses

- Alois Lexa von Aehrenthal
- Archduke Albrecht, Duke of Teschen
- Alexander I of Serbia
- Alexander of Battenberg
- Count Kasimir Felix Badeni
- Andrew Bertie
- Otto von Bismarck
- Julian Byng, 1st Viscount Byng of Vimy
- Armand De Ceuninck
- Desmond de Silva (barrister)
- Botho zu Eulenburg
- Charles Granville Fortescue
- Archduke Franz Ferdinand of Austria
- Frederick Francis III, Grand Duke of Mecklenburg-Schwerin
- Frederick III, German Emperor
- George VI
- Agenor Maria Gołuchowski
- Prince Henry of Prussia (1862–1929)
- Higashifushimi Yorihito
- Konstantin of Hohenlohe-Schillingsfürst
- Prince Kuni Kuniyoshi
- Aleksey Kuropatkin
- Prince Leopold of Bavaria
- Archduke Leopold Salvator of Austria
- Louis IV, Grand Duke of Hesse
- Archduke Ludwig Viktor of Austria
- Milan I of Serbia
- George Milne, 1st Baron Milne
- Prince Nicholas of Romania
- Nicholas I of Montenegro
- Danail Nikolaev
- Đurđe Ninković
- Archduke Otto of Austria (1865–1906)
- Radomir Putnik
- Sir William Robertson, 1st Baronet
- Prince Rudolf of Liechtenstein
- Andrew Hamilton Russell
- Edward Rydz-Śmigły
- Charles Spencer, 6th Earl Spencer
- Vladimir Sukhomlinov
- Jan Syrový
- Nikola Tesla
- Ernest Troubridge
- Queen Victoria
- Illarion Vorontsov-Dashkov
- Wilhelmina of the Netherlands
- Sergei Witte
- August zu Eulenburg

Grand Officers

- Charles James Briggs
- Sholto Douglas, 1st Baron Douglas of Kirtleside
- Alexander Godley
- Jevrem Grujić
- Dimitrios Ioannou
- Lyman Lemnitzer
- Joseph T. McNarney
- Živojin Bumbaširević

Commanders

- William Wallace Atterbury
- Herbert Henry Austin
- Edward Chaytor
- Cyril Clowes
- Webb Gillman
- Talbot Hobbs
- Ivan Kolev (general)
- Arthur Laumann
- Charles Maynard
- Svetozar T. Nešić
- Tadeusz Piskor
- Roman Sondermajer
- Stepa Stepanović
- Prince Tomislav of Yugoslavia
- Bolesław Wieniawa-Długoszowski

Officers

- John Boswell (rugby union)
- Willy Coppens
- James Durrant
- Cecil Foott
- Gilbert W. M. Green
- Sir James Horlick, 4th Baronet
- Sergěj Ingr
- Carl Jess
- John Meredith (general)
- Curt von Morgen
- Karl von Plettenberg
- Edward Murray Colston, 2nd Baron Roundway
- Claude Taylor (rower)
- Claud Tudor

Knights

- Lionel Gough Arbuthnot
- Ernest Lucas Guest
- Aubrey Herbert
- Richard W. O'Neill
- Hiraji Cursetji

Other or Unknown Classes

- Paul Émile Appell
- Léon Bérard
- Afrikan P. Bogaewsky
- John Boswell (rugby union)
- E. T. Burke
- Charles Edward Callwell
- Stanislav Čeček
- Dimitrije Cincar-Marković
- Travers Clarke
- Henry Day
- Anton Denikin
- Viktor Dousmanis
- Dragutin Matić
- Nićifor Dučić
- John Duncan (British Army officer, born 1872)
- Alexander Fisher (sound engineer)
- Archduke Franz Salvator of Austria
- Helen Losanitch Frothingham
- Grigore Gafencu
- Wladimir Giesl von Gieslingen
- Vivian Green-Armytage
- Émile Guépratte
- George Harper
- Herbert Hoover
- Isabel Emslie Hutton
- Elsie Inglis
- Božidar Janković
- Antonija Javornik
- Germanos Karavangelis
- Henry Keary
- Vladimir Kokovtsov
- Alexander Kolchak
- Georgios Kondylis
- Francis Lloyd (British Army officer)
- Herbert Lloyd
- Douglas MacArthur
- Compton Mackenzie
- Rudolf Maister
- Aleksandar Mašin
- William Meldrum (general)
- Draža Mihailović
- Čedomilj Mijatović
- Mikhail Nikolayevich Muravyov
- Milutin Nedić
- Ralph Paget
- Leonidas Paraskevopoulos
- Peter Patton
- Mārtiņš Peniķis
- Milorad Petrović
- Frederick Alfred Pile
- Duncan Pirie
- Alessandro Pirzio Biroli
- Jovan Ristić
- Varnava, Serbian Patriarch
- Ralph Royce
- Nicolae Samsonovici
- Humphry Sandwith
- Maurice Sarrail
- Ivan Smirnov (aviator)
- Leonid Solarević
- Stefan I of Bulgaria
- Nicolae Titulescu
- Essad Pasha Toptani
- Charles Treat
- Đorđe Vajfert
- Charles J. Vopicka
- Maxime Weygand
- Henry Fuller Maitland Wilson
- Wilfrid Woods
- Charles Woollcombe
- František Zach
