= Eric MacKay =

Scotland international rugby union player

- Born: Eric Bryce MacKay; 5 August 1899 Kinning Park, Scotland
- Died: 23 July 1966 (aged 66) East Kilbride, Scotland

Rugby union career
- Position: Wing
Amateur team(s)
Years	Team	Apps	(Points)
- Glasgow Academicals
Provincial / State sides
Years	Team	Apps	(Points)
- Glasgow District
International career
Years	Team	Apps	(Points)
1920-22	Scotland	2	((0))

Eric MacKay (5 August 1899 – 23 July 1966) was a Scottish former international rugby union player who played for Glasgow Academicals. He was a Wing.

== Rugby Union career ==
=== Amateur career ===
MacKay played for Glasgow Academicals.

=== Provincial career ===
MacKay was capped by Glasgow District. He was part of the team that won the 1921-22 Inter-City against Edinburgh District.

MacKay played in an era where both Glasgow District and Edinburgh District were noted for having clever players in their back lines; and Glasgow backs were noted as 'a high a standard as Glasgow has attained at almost any stage in the [Inter-City] series'.

=== International career ===
MacKay was capped 2 times for Scotland. His debut came in the Scotland v Wales match of 7 February 1920 at Inverleith.
