= Robert Rainie =

Scottish rugby union player & referee

- Born: Robert Dick Rainie; 25 September 1860 Edinburgh, Scotland
- Died: c. 6 October 1945 (aged 85) Edinburgh, Scotland
- School: Merchiston Castle School

Rugby union career
- Position: Forward
Amateur team(s)
Years	Team	Apps	(Points)
1882-84	Edinburgh Wanderers		
Refereeing career
Years	Competition		Apps
1890-94	Home Nations		

24th President of the Scottish Rugby Union
- In office 1897–1898
- Preceded by: Graham Findlay
- Succeeded by: John Boswell

Robert Rainie (25 September 1860 – c. October 1945) was a Scottish rugby union player. He later became an international referee and was the 24th President of the Scottish Rugby Union.

== Rugby Union career ==
=== Amateur career ===
Rainie played for Edinburgh Wanderers.

=== Referee career ===
He refereed the England versus Wales match in the 1890 Home Nations Championship and the Wales versus England match in the 1891 Home Nations Championship. and the Ireland versus Wales match in the 1894 Home Nations Championship.

=== Administrative career ===
Rainie became the 24th President of the Scottish Rugby Union. He served the 1897–98 term in office.

== Outside of rugby ==
Rainie was a Chartered Accountant. He was a partner in the firm Brewis, Rainie and Boyd.

He was an auditor of Mortonhall Golf Club.

His brother was the Rev. William Rainie, a minister of Newton-on-Ayr parish for 47 years.

Robert Rainie died circa October 1945. The Executory Notice of his estate was advertised in The Scotsman on 6 October 1945.
