= Daniel Drew (rugby union) =

Scotland international rugby union player

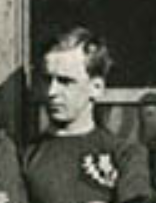
- Born: Daniel Drew c. 1850 Dunoon, Argyll and Bute, Scotland
- Died: 2 February 1914 Burnley, England
- Notable relative(s): Thomas Auchterlonie Drew, brother

Rugby union career
- Position: Forward
Amateur team(s)
Years	Team	Apps	(Points)
- Glasgow Academicals
International career
Years	Team	Apps	(Points)
1871-6	Scotland	2	(0)

Daniel Drew (c. 1850 - 2 February 1914) was a Scottish international rugby union player who played for Glasgow Academicals in Glasgow.

Born in Dunoon in about 1850, Drew played as a Forward.

Drew played in the first ever rugby union international match for Scotland against England in 27 March 1871 at Raeburn Place, Edinburgh.

Almost five years later Daniel received another Scotland call up to play against England. He played in the 6 March 1876 match at The Oval in London.

Drew's brother Thomas Auchterlonie Drew also played for Glasgow Academicals. Although Thomas never made the Scotland national team, he did play for Glasgow District. Thomas was involved in his own first, when he played for Glasgow District against Edinburgh District on 23 November 1872, the world's very first inter-provincial and inter-city rugby union match.
