= 1880–81 Scottish Districts season =

Rugby union competition

- Countries: Scotland
- Date: 1880-81
- Matches played: 2

The 1880–81 Scottish Districts season is a record of all the rugby union matches for Scotland's district teams.

It includes the East of Scotland District versus West of Scotland District trial match.

== History ==
It was planned that a new district fixture be played this season. A North versus South fixture, but owing to weather it had to wait another season.

From the Aberdeen Press and Journal of 19 December 1881, recalling events of this season:

For half a dozen years or so, the Aberdeenshire have been members of the Union [SRU], and up to the present time neither they nor the numerous provincial clubs throughout Scotland have procured any practical benefit from their connection with that body unless (if we may say so) the pleasure of contributing annually a guinea annually towards its funds. About a year ago [Season 1880-81] the captain of Aberdeenshire, at the annual meeting of the union, urged the claims of the provincial clubs and pointed out that in return for their annual subscriptions they were entitled to some greater benefit than a yearly invitation to two of their members to attend the annual meeting of the Union. On the suggestion of Mr. Brewis, the then secretary of the union, the North v South match was instituted.

On 18 October 1880 the Honorary Secretary of the Scottish Rugby Union, Nat Brewis, announced a new District fixture: the North of Scotland District versus the South of Scotland District. The new fixture was scheduled for 1 January 1881. The teams were announced on 31 December 1880. However there are no reports of the match coming to fruition.

The Aberdeen Press and Journal of 19 December 1881, stated that the match was not played:

The severe snowstorms of last winter, however, prevented this fixture was coming off.

Nil-Nil at half time, the Inter-City match changed when Glasgow's Malcom Cross left the field injured. At the time there were no substitutes and Glasgow had to play with 14 men.

The East v West was postponed due to frost, but rescheduled for 5 February 1881.

Writing in October 1942 in The Scotsman, E. D. H. Sewell states that referees came into the game in 1885-86 season; before that the captains ran the match; after that two umpires one chosen from each team. But it can be seen from the refereeing appointment of Nat Brewis in the East v West district match that referees were chosen well before that season.

== Results ==
Date	Try	Conversion	Penalty	Dropped goal	Goal from mark	Notes
1876–1885	1 try	1 goal	1 goal	1 goal	—N/a	
1876–1885	Match decided by a majority of goals, or if the number of goals is equal by a majority of tries					

=== Inter-City ===
4 December 1880
3.10pm

Glasgow District	0 - 1 goal, 2 tries	Edinburgh District
	Report; Report	Try: Thomas Begbie; William Peterkin x 2 Con: W. H. Masters; Thomas Begbie

Hamilton Crescent, Glasgow
Referee: D. H. Watson

Glasgow District: A. J. W. Reid (West of Scotland), M. Cross (Glasgow Academicals) [captain], R. C. Mackenzie (Glasgow Academicals), D. W. Kidston (Glasgow Academicals), J. A. Campbell (Glasgow Academicals), H. Moncrieff (West of Scotland), B. Allan (Glasgow Academicals), J. B. Brown (Glasgow Academicals), J. E. Junor (Glasgow Academicals), R. Menzies (Southern), D. Y. Cassells (West of Scotland), D. McCowan (West of Scotland), J. Adam (West of Scotland), G. H. Robb (Glasgow University), R. Young (Glasgow University)
Edinburgh District: B. Cunningham (Institution F. P.), Thomas Begbie (Edinburgh Wanderers), N. J. Finlay (Edinburgh Academicals), W. H. Masters (Institution F.P.), P. W. Smeaton (Edinburgh Academicals), A. G. Petrie (Royal HSFP) [captain], G. C. Alexander (Edinburgh Wanderers), H. M. Davidson (Royal HSFP), W. Somerville (Institution F.P.), J. H. S. Graham (Edinburgh Academicals), T. Ainslie (Institution F. P.), C. Reid (Edinburgh Academicals), R. S. F. Henderson (Edinburgh University), H. E. Jones (Edinburgh Wanderers), William Peterkin (Edinburgh University)

=== Other Scottish matches ===
5 February 1881

East of Scotland District	2 goals - 0	West of Scotland District
Try: C. Reid; R. Ainslie; Con: Masters x 2	Report; Report

Raeburn Place, Edinburgh
Referee: Nat Brewis (Hon. sec. Scottish Rugby Union)

East: B. A. Cunningham (Edinburgh Institution F.P.) (back); Thomas Begbie (Edinburgh Wanderers), N. J. Finlay (Edinburgh Academicals), (half backs); W. H. Masters (Edinburgh Institution F.P.), P. W. Smeaton (Edinburgh Academicals) (quarter backs); A. G. Petrie (captain), H. M. Davidson (Royal HSFF.P.), J. H. S. Duncan, C. Reid (Edinburgh Academicals), G. Alexander. (Wanderers). R. Ainslie, D. Somerville, Robert Maitland (Edinburgh Institution, F.P.), R. S. F. Henderson (Edinburgh University), William Peterkin (Edinburgh University) (forwards).
West: J. S. Carrick (Glasgow Academicals) (back), R. C. Mackenzie (captain), D. W. Kidston (Glasgow Academicals), R. Steele (Greenock Wanderers) (half backs); J. A. Campbell, A. B Graham (Glasgow Academicals) (quarter backs); B. Allan, R. G. Allan, J. B. Brown (Glasgow Academicals), David Cassels (West of Scotland), David McCowan (West of Scotland). J. B. Gemmell, R. E. Menzies (Southern). A. L. M'Clure (Greenock Wanderers), George Robb (Glasgow University)

=== English matches ===
No other District matches played.

=== International matches ===
No touring matches this season.
