= Bryce Allan =

Scotland international rugby union player (1859–1922)

- Born: Bryce Allan; 1 March 1859 Glasgow, Scotland
- Died: 22 August 1922 (aged 63) Wemyss Bay, Scotland
- Notable relative(s): Alexander Allan, grandfather

Rugby union career
- Position: Forward
Amateur team(s)
Years	Team	Apps	(Points)
-	Glasgow Academicals		
Provincial / State sides
Years	Team	Apps	(Points)
1880	Glasgow District		
1881	West of Scotland District		
International career
Years	Team	Apps	(Points)
1881	Scotland	1	(0)

Bryce Allan (1 March 1859 – 22 August 1922) was a Scotland international rugby union player.

== Rugby Union career ==
=== Amateur career ===
He played for Glasgow Academicals.

=== Provincial career ===
He played for Glasgow District in their inter-city match against Edinburgh District on 4 December 1880.

He played for West of Scotland District in their match against East of Scotland District on 5 February 1881.

=== International career ===
He was capped for Scotland just the once, in 1881, against Ireland.

== Business career ==
He became a merchant and shipowner, along with his brothers Henry Allan and Richard Gilkinson Allan. They ran the Clyde firm, the Allan Line Steamship Company; founded by their grandfather Alexander Allan.

In 1905, he took a lease of the North Bute shootings.

The value of Allan's estate when he died was £224,358, 3 shillings and 10 pence.

== Family ==
He was born to James Allan (1808-1880) and Eleanor Blair Gilkinson (1822-1868), one of 8 children. He married Anne Smiley Clark in 1886. They had 2 children; Annie Clark (Nita) Allan and James Bryce Allan.
