= John Boswell (rugby union) =

Scotland international rugby union player & referee

- Born: John Douglas Boswell; 16 February 1867 Garallan House, East Ayrshire, Scotland
- Died: 5 January 1948 (aged 80) Edinburgh, Scotland
- School: Rugby School; Loretto School
- University: Brasenose College, Oxford; University of Glasgow

Rugby union career
- Position: Forward
Amateur team(s)
Years	Team	Apps	(Points)
1885-87	Oxford University		
–	West of Scotland		
Provincial / State sides
Years	Team	Apps	(Points)
1889	Glasgow District		
International career
Years	Team	Apps	(Points)
1889–94	Scotland	15	(27)
Refereeing career
Years	Competition		Apps
1899	Scottish Districts		

25th President of the Scottish Rugby Union
- In office 1898–1899
- Preceded by: Robert Rainie
- Succeeded by: Ian MacIntyre

John Boswell (16 February 1867 – 5 January 1948) was a Scotland international rugby union player. He was the 25th President of the Scottish Rugby Union. He served in the military in the Boer War and the First World War and won the Serbian medal Order of the White Eagle in 1917. He was a Writer to the Signet and owned Garallan House near Cumnock.

== Rugby union career ==
=== Amateur career ===
Boswell was introduced to rugby union at Rugby School and then Loretto School in Musselburgh. At Brasenose College he played for Oxford University.

In Scotland he played for West of Scotland.

=== Provincial career ===
He was capped by Glasgow District in the inter-city match of 1889.

=== International career ===
Boswell played 15 times for Scotland.

He captained Scotland in 1890 and in 1893. He was described as 'florid and stout almost to rotundity'.

Boswell is the only Scotland forward to score a drop goal in two international matches (versus Ireland 1890 & versus England 1893).

=== Referee career ===
He refereed in the Scottish Districts match between Cities District and Provinces District on 14 January 1899.

=== Administrative career ===
Boswell became the 25th President of the Scottish Rugby Union. He served the 1898–99 term in office.

== Military career ==
In the 2nd Boer War of 1900–01, Boswell served in the 6th Scottish Battalion Imperial Yeomanry.

In the First World War, Boswell served in the military as a Lieutenant Colonel of the Royal Scots Fusiliers, 12th battalion, which were the Ayrshire Yeomanry; working on coast defences. Boswell saw action in Gallipoli; Egypt, at the Battles of Katta and Romani; Palestine, at the Battles of Gaza; and France.

He was awarded the Order of the White Eagle (Serbia), 4th class with swords.

== Law career ==
He received a Bachelor of Law from the University of Glasgow in 1906 and an LL.B. in 1907.

He was a Writer to the Signet.

== Family ==
Boswell owned the Garallan House estate near Cumnock in Ayrshire. Garallan House was first owned by the Campbells and then the Douglases. One of Boswell's ancestors, his great uncle, Hamilton Boswell married Jane Douglas and acquired Garallan. Boswell was born at Garallan.

In 1920, Boswell bought Auchinleck House in Ayrshire from Talbot de Malahide, a descendant of James Boswell. Boswell stayed in 8 Heriot Row in Edinburgh in the 1930s, just before it was converted into flats.
