= McCowan baronets =

Baronetcy in the Baronetage of the United Kingdom

The McCowan Baronetcy, of Dalwhat in the County of Dumfries, is a title in the Baronetage of the United Kingdom. It was created on 26 June 1934 for Sir David McCowan. He was a senior partner in William Euing & Co, marine insurance brokers, and Honorary President of the Scottish Unionist Association.

The third and fourth Baronets did not successfully prove their succession to the title and the fifth and present Baronet has also yet to prove his succession and is not on the Official Roll of the Baronetage, with the baronetcy officially considered dormant.

== McCowan baronets, of Dalwhat (1934) ==
- Sir David McCowan, Kt., 1st Baronet (1860–1937)
- Sir David James Cargill McCowan, 2nd Baronet (1897–1965)
- Sir Hew Cargill McCowan, presumed 3rd Baronet (1930–1998)
- Sir David William Cargill McCowan, 4th Baronet (1934–2020)
- Sir David James Cargill McCowan, 5th Baronet (born 1975)

There is no heir to the baronetcy.
