= William Russell (rugby union) =

- Full name: William Laing Russell
- Born: 31 May 1880 Glasgow, Scotland
- Died: 31 October 1933 (aged 53) Ayr, Scotland

Rugby union career
- Position: Wing-forward
International career
Years	Team	Apps	(Points)
1905–06	Scotland	4	(0)

William Laing Russell (31 May 1880 — 31 October 1933) was a Scottish international rugby union player.

Born in Glasgow, Russell was the son of Magistrate Sir William Russell and an elder brother of Albert Russell, who was an MP and Solicitor General for Scotland during the 1930s.

Russell became one of Scotland's best swimmers as a teenager and was a member of the Western Swimming Club. He won Scottish swimming championships in the 50 yards, 100 yards, 220 yards, 440 yards and half-mile. As a water polo player, Russell represented Scotland in matches against England, Ireland and Wales.

A wing-forward, Russell played his rugby for Glasgow Academicals and debuted for Scotland against the first ever New Zealand touring team in 1905, known as the Original All Blacks, before gaining a further three caps the following year.

Russell was senior partner of a Glasgow coal exporting firm.

== See also ==
- List of Scotland national rugby union players
