= 1921 Five Nations Championship =

Rugby union competition

- Date: 15 January – 9 April 1921
- Countries: England; France; Ireland; Scotland; Wales

Tournament statistics
- Champions: England (7th title)
- Grand Slam: England (3rd title)
- Triple Crown: England (6th title)
- Matches played: 10

The 1921 Five Nations Championship was the seventh series of the rugby union Five Nations Championship following the inclusion of France into the Home Nations Championship. Including the previous Home Nations Championships, this was the thirty-fourth series of the annual northern hemisphere rugby union championship. Ten matches were played between 15 January and 9 April. It was contested by England, France, Ireland, Scotland and Wales.

== Table ==
Pos	Team	Pld	W	D	L	PF	PA	PD	Pts
1	England	4	4	0	0	61	9	+52	8
2	France	4	2	0	2	33	32	+1	4
2	Wales	4	2	0	2	29	36	−7	4
4	Scotland	4	1	0	3	22	38	−16	2
4	Ireland	4	1	0	3	19	49	−30	2

== Results ==
1921-01-15

England	18–3	Wales

London
Referee: John Sturrock

1921-01-22

Scotland	0–3	France

Edinburgh

1921-02-05

Wales	8–14	Scotland

Swansea

1921-02-12

England	15–0	Ireland

London

1921-02-26

Wales	12–4	France

Cardiff

1921-02-26

Ireland	9–8	Scotland

Dublin

1921-03-12

Ireland	0–6	Wales

Belfast

1921-03-19

Scotland	0–18	England

Edinburgh

1921-03-28

France	6–10	England

Paris
Referee: John Sturrock

1921-04-09

France	20–10	Ireland

Paris
