= Lionel Weston =

England international rugby union player

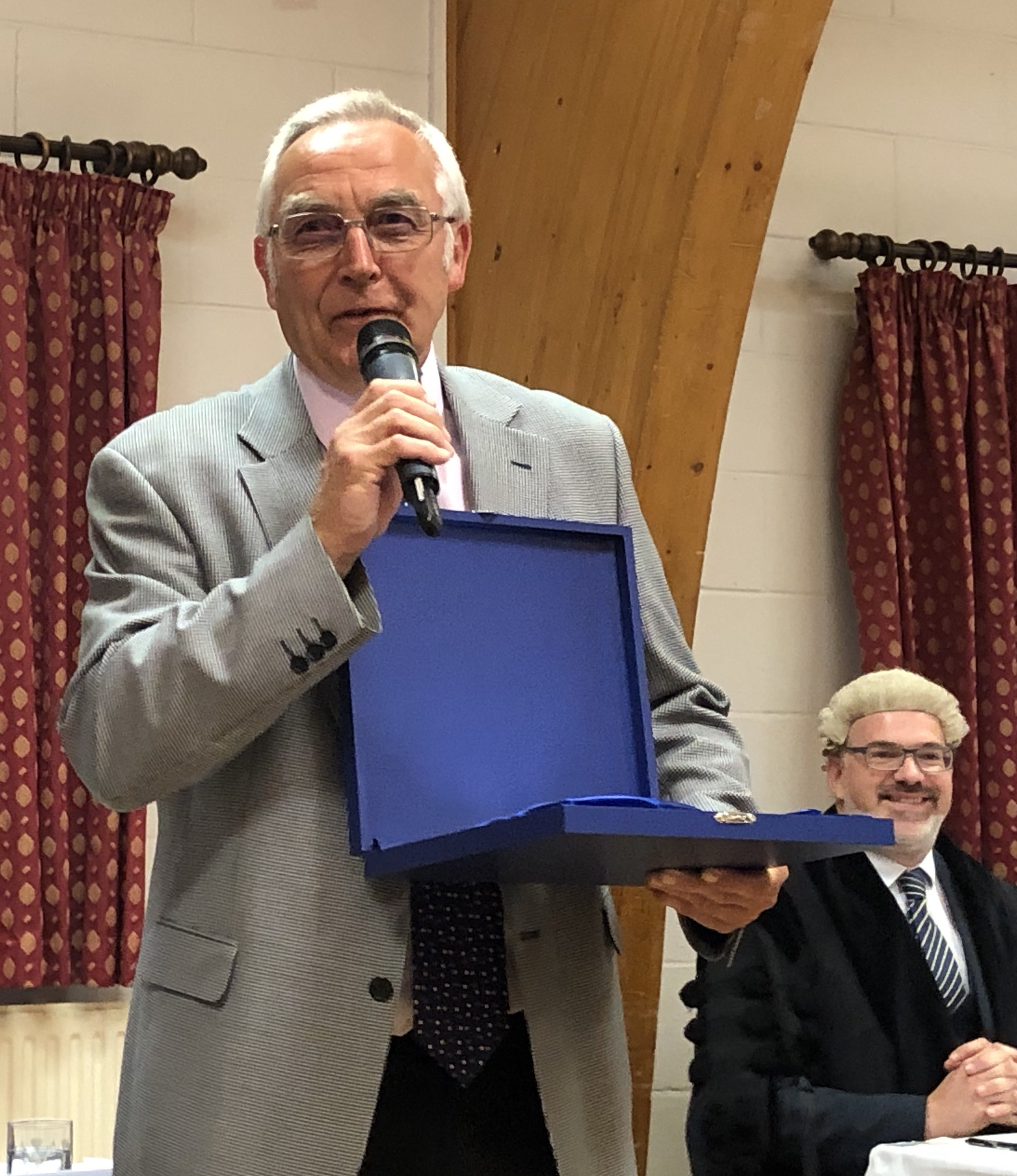
- Born: Lionel Edward Weston; 22 February 1947 (age 79) Wenlock, Shropshire
- School: Bedford Modern School

Rugby union career
- Position: Scrum half
Senior career
| Years | Team | Apps | (Points) |
- West of Scotland F.C.
International career
| Years | Team | Apps | (Points) |
| 1972 | England | 2 | |

Lionel Edward Weston (born 22 February 1947) played for the England rugby team.

== Life ==
Weston was born on 22 February 1947 at Wenlock in Shropshire. He was educated at Bedford Modern School.

Weston's test debut was against France at Colombes on 26 February 1972. He played one further game for England against Scotland at Murrayfield on 18 March 1972. In terms of club rugby, Weston played for Bedford, West of Scotland F.C. and Rosslyn Park. He is often quoted for his remark, ‘I don’t know why prop forwards play rugby’.

On 17 May 2019, Weston was awarded the title of Friend of Buckingham.
