= George Murray (rugby union) =

Scotland international rugby union player

George Murray was a Scottish international rugby union player.

He was capped twice for Scotland in 1921 and 1926. He also played for Glasgow Academicals RFC.

His brother Ronald was also capped for Scotland.
