= Jack Warren =

Scotland international rugby union player

- Born: John Russell Warren; 13 August 1889 Glasgow, Scotland
- Died: 28 April 1941 (aged 51) Glasgow, Scotland

Rugby union career
- Position: Centre
Amateur team(s)
Years	Team	Apps	(Points)
- Glasgow Academicals
Provincial / State sides
Years	Team	Apps	(Points)
- Glasgow District
International career
Years	Team	Apps	(Points)
1914	Scotland	1	(0)

John Russell Warren (13 August 1889 – 28 April 1941) was a Scotland international rugby union footballer. He played as a Centre.

== Rugby Union career ==
=== Amateur career ===
Warren played for Glasgow Academicals.

=== Provincial career ===
Warren played in the Inter-City match between Glasgow District and Edinburgh District on 7 December 1912. Edinburgh ran out victors with a 13 - 6 scoreline. 3000 spectators braved the rain soaked conditions. Edinburgh led 10 - 3 at half-time and comfortably saw out the second half. Warren had one break for the try-line near the end but was tackled by Edinburgh's Badger just before the line.

Warren also played in the Inter-City match on 6 December 1913. This match ended as a draw; with both teams scoring one drop goal a-piece. Warren made a crucial tackle at the end of the match stopping Edinburgh's Pearson from running through at Glasgow's 22.

=== International career ===
Warren was capped for Scotland only the once.

This was the Five Nations match of 28 February 1914 when Scotland played Ireland at Lansdowne Road.

The match turned for Ireland when Scotland failed to capitalise on two chances in quick succession:- the first when John Sweet was tackled into touch when going for the try-line; and the second when Warren knocked on. The Glasgow Herald noted that had Warren passed to John George Will instead, Will would have had a clear run to the line.

Ireland won the match 6 - 0.

== Civil Engineering career ==
Outside of rugby union, Warren became a Civil Engineer.
