= David Fisher (rugby union) =

Scotland international rugby union player

- Born: David Fisher; 4 July 1871 Glasgow, Scotland
- Died: 1 October 1932 (aged 61) Glasgow, Scotland

Rugby union career
- Position: Forward
Amateur team(s)
| Years | Team | Apps | (Points) |
- West of Scotland
Provincial / State sides
| Years | Team | Apps | (Points) |
| 1892 | Glasgow District | | |
International career
| Years | Team | Apps | (Points) |
| 1893 | Scotland | 1 | (0) |

David Fisher (4 July 1871 – 1 October 1932) was a Scotland international rugby union player. His regular playing position was Forward.

== Rugby Union career ==
=== Amateur career ===
Fisher played rugby union for West of Scotland.

=== Provincial career ===
Fisher was named as a reserve for Glasgow District for their match against North of Scotland District on 15 December 1888.

Fisher was picked for Glasgow District for their match against North of Scotland District on 13 December 1890.

Fisher played for Glasgow District in their inter-city match against Edinburgh District in 1892, the Glasgow Herald noting him as 'D. Fisher junior'.

=== International career ===
Fisher was capped once by Scotland, in 1893.

Fisher's ability split opinion on those who thought he was a notable forward and those who didn't. One Scottish Referee newspaper commentator rated all of the Glasgow District forwards and out of the 9 forwards tipped for selection for the time Fisher was among the best and good with his feet. Another Scottish Referee commentator said of Fisher's selection to the international team that he 'was a good way outside of the ability which should be in a Scotland team.'

== Other sports ==
Fisher was also in the West of Scotland Harriers.
