= William Gibson Biggart =

Scotland international rugby union player

- Born: 27 August 1918 Glasgow, Scotland
- Died: 13 February 1999 (aged 80) Stirling, Scotland

Rugby union career
- Position: Centre
Amateur team(s)
Years	Team	Apps	(Points)
-	Glasgow Academicals		
Provincial / State sides
Years	Team	Apps	(Points)
1938-	Glasgow District		
International career
Years	Team	Apps	(Points)
1943-	Scotland	1	(0)

William Gibson Biggart (27 August 1918 – 13 February 1999) was a Scottish international rugby union player. He played as a Centre.

== Rugby Union career ==
=== Amateur career ===
Biggart played for Glasgow Academicals.

=== Provincial career ===
Biggart played for Glasgow District. He played in the 1938-39 Inter-city match against Edinburgh District.

=== International career ===
He was capped for Scotland during the Second World War in the Services international. Scotland made the decision to cap those games and Biggart was retrospectively given a cap. He made his debut for Scotland on 10 April 1943 playing against England at Leicester.

== Business career ==
He was the former and founder chairman of Clyde Petroleum in 1973; and then was chairman of Wheway Watson.
