= Alexander Robertson (rugby union) =

Scotland international rugby union player

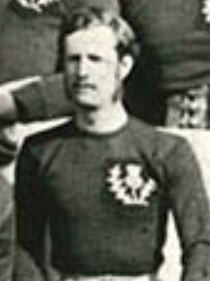
- Born: Alexander Hamilton Robertson; 1 October 1848 Ayr, Scotland
- Died: 12 May 1913 (aged 64) London, England

Rugby union career
- Position: Forward
Amateur team(s)
Years	Team	Apps	(Points)
- West of Scotland
International career
Years	Team	Apps	(Points)
1871	Scotland	1	(0)

Alexander Robertson (1 October 1848 – 13 May 1913) was a Scottish former international rugby union player who played for West of Scotland. He was a Forward.

== Rugby Union career ==
=== Amateur career ===
Robertson played for West of Scotland. He was playing for the club in 1868. He captained the West of Scotland side in 1870.

=== International career ===
He was capped only the once for Scotland. His debut came in the very first international match in 1871 playing against England at Raeburn Place, Edinburgh.

== Military career ==
He joined the Royal Ayrshire and Wigton Militia.
