= William Milne (rugby union) =

Scotland international rugby union player

- Born: William Murray Milne; 27 August 1883 Glasgow, Scotland
- Died: 16 December 1982 (aged 99) Crail, Scotland

Rugby union career
- Position: Forward
Amateur team(s)
| Years | Team | Apps | (Points) |
- Glasgow Academicals
Provincial / State sides
| Years | Team | Apps | (Points) |
| 1904 | Glasgow District | | |
| 1905 | Cities District | | |
International career
| Years | Team | Apps | (Points) |
| 1904-05 | Scotland | 4 | (0) |

Rev. William Milne (27 July 1883 – 16 December 1982) was a Scotland international rugby union player. After playing rugby, he became a minister in the Church of Scotland.

== Rugby Union career ==
=== Amateur career ===
He played for Glasgow Academicals.

He was part of the Academicals side that won the Scottish Unofficial Championship in 1904-05 and 1905–06 seasons.

=== Provincial career ===
He played for Glasgow District in the 1904 inter-city match against Edinburgh District.

He played for Cities District in the January 1905 match against Provinces District.

=== International career ===
He was capped for Scotland 4 times in the period 1904 to 1905.

== Ecclesiastical career ==
Milne became a Reverend in the Church of Scotland. He was a Minister of the parish of Crail in the presbytery of St. Andrews in Fife.

During the First World War, Milne became a driver for the Red Cross in France. His parish was temporarily administered by Rev. D. W. Kennedy of Perth. Milne wrote letters back to his congregation, one of which was reported in the East Fife Record newspaper of 26 October 1916, the letter from Milne dated before that.

Rouen, 15th Oct., 1916. MY DEAR FRIENDS, By the time this reaches you three months will have passed since I left Crail. In the usual reckoning it is not a long time, but looking back there seems quite a gap between my wonted life and the life I am living at the present and the work on which lam engaged. Yet though the days are full of new interest and new duties, no day is so full but thoughts of the old duties and interests and friends can find a place in it. I look forward eagerly for news of Crail and from Crail, and a letter or a newspaper from the East Neuk sends my thoughts across the sundering miles to you and the place where you dwell. There is no need at this time — nor indeed would it be possible — that I should tell you fully of the work here. In a general way I may say that it is driving the wounded in motor ambulances to one or other of the hospitals in or around Rouen. The unloading of the trains of wounded is a sad enough sight, and one that does not lose its pathos even with repetition. It is a sight that all should see who speak lightly of war or emphasise the glamour and glitter of it, for the romantic side of things is conspicuous by its absence. Yet there are fine things even in these processions of bruised and battered humanity wounded men badly in need of help themselves, yet helping some lame comrade; men enduring in grim silence an agony of suffering; cheerful souls speaking hopefully of the future though they have lost a limb or an eye, and "must enter into life maimed" after the war. One is impressed with the fact that a short time here brings about a readjustment of moral values, that some things which at home seem of great importance shrink to insignificance, and other virtues which had slipped into the background loom large and vital here. I have seen nothing to justify the talk of those who speak of our soldier saints. There is much that is sinful and revolting, but much, too, that is unselfish and great. A pleasanter bit of work is driving the wounded to the hospital ship or the train conveying them to the port of embarkation for home, or "Blighty' as they always call it. The men are very happy to go home, and I have never met one who wanted to come back to France. Homesickness is a disease that is very prevalent, and naturally since no man wishes to be away from those he loves best. We miss our quiet Scottish Sabbath and the House of God. War knows nothing of Sabbaths or Churches, and the most we can have to distinguish Sundays from week days is a short service conducted by a neighbouring chaplain. It is on the Sabbath especially that my thoughts turn to the ancient Kirk of Crail and its pleasant surroundings. I am glad to hear that all is going well, and that the faithful services of Mr Kennedy are so much appreciated. I hope that every member and adherent will remember the responsibilities as well as the privileges of church membership, and will endeavour to make his or her contribution to the life and worship of the Church. It is the beginning of the winter's work, and my sincere prayer is that the work may be rich in the spirit of kindness and gentleness and sincerity, that it may be a blessing to all who take part in it, and fruitful of good things. You will have disadvantages and hindrances owing to the lighting restrictions and the unavoidable reduction of numbers because of the demands of war, but I trust that enthusiasm will more than counterbalance these. Assuring you of my continued interest in your welfare, I remain, Your minister and friend, Ww. M. MILNE.

== Family ==
He was born to George Milne and Barbara Murray.

He married Kathleen Florence May Lumsden in 1919.

William Milne and Kathleen Lumsden had a son, also William Murray Milne (1920–1977).
