= Ronald Murray (rugby union) =

Scotland international rugby union player

Ronald Murray (November 14, 1912 – March 5, 1995) was a Scottish international rugby union player.

He was capped twice for Scotland in 1935. He also played for Cambridge University RFC.

His brother George was also capped for Scotland.
