= George Robb (rugby union) =

Scotland international rugby union player

- Born: George Henry Robb; 24 September 1858 Glasgow, Scotland
- Died: 15 April 1927 (aged 68) Glasgow, Scotland

Rugby union career
- Position: Forward
Amateur team(s)
Years	Team	Apps	(Points)
1880	Glasgow University		
1881	Glasgow Academicals		
Provincial / State sides
Years	Team	Apps	(Points)
1880	Glasgow District		
1881	West of Scotland District		
International career
Years	Team	Apps	(Points)
1881-85	Scotland	2	(0)

George Robb (24 September 1858 – 15 April 1927) was a Scotland international rugby union player.

== Rugby Union career ==
=== Amateur career ===
Robb played rugby union for Glasgow University.

He moved in season 1881–82 to play for Glasgow Academicals.

=== Provincial career ===
He was capped by Glasgow District in the inter-city match against Edinburgh District in 1880. He also played the following year in December 1881.

He was also capped by West of Scotland District in 1881.

=== International career ===
Robb was capped twice by Scotland from 1881 to 1885.
