= Hawick and Wilton RFC =

Scottish rugby union club, based in Hawick

(Scotland) Hawick and Wilton RFC
- Full name: Hawick and Wilton Rugby Football Club
- Union: Scottish Rugby Union
- Founded: 1873; 153 years ago
- Disbanded: 1890; 136 years ago
- Location: Hawick
- Ground: Buccleuch Park

Hawick and Wilton RFC was a nineteenth-century Hawick-based rugby union club. It is historically important both as the progenitor of Hawick RFC; and as the instator of the Hawick and Wilton Sevens tournament - which was the fourth oldest rugby union Sevens tournament in the world. Hawick and Wilton RFC and Hawick RFC were two distinct teams and were rivals for a period.

== History ==
The Hawick and Wilton rugby club grew out of the associated Hawick and Wilton Cricket Club.

In October 1872, members of the cricket club decided that in order to keep fit over the winter they should begin playing football. Both association and rugby union football were experimented with but the rugby format triumphed as it was considered "manlier and more congenial to the Border nature than the tamer association game". The club was formed on 8 December 1873.

=== First match ===
Hawick and Wilton played its first official match on 7 February 1874. This was against Langholm RFC; a club heavily influenced by the sons of Tweed manufacturers who were educated across the Scottish border in England.

Scottish rugby clubs standardised most of today's rules of rugby union around the 1860s:- by formulating The Green Book in 1858; the Blairgowrie and Rattray Laws of 1865 and the Kilmarnock Rules of 1869. and these were adopted by almost all of Scotland's early rugby union clubs, including Hawick and Wilton. The club's captain at the time, Robert Michie, got copies of the Scottish rules and had several club meetings to make sure that these were being followed.

Langholm RFC however then played the English variant of rugby union which had crossed the border from Carlisle. In the match between Hawick & Wilton and Langholm a dispute broke out regarding what would constitute a goal:- Langholm contending that a goal was scored by the ball going under the bar; Hawick & Wilton insisting that a goal was only scored by the ball going over the bar.

Nevertheless, the match was played in good spirit.

== Splinter club ==
Hawick RFC began as a splinter club from Hawick and Wilton RFC in 1885. Rugby was gaining prominence and instead of being essentially a cricket club with a rugby club arm; the offshoot club focused purely on rugby union. Hawick RFC moved to the nearby Volunteer Park and played in green colours.

Both Hawick clubs co-existed for a few years; initially, Hawick and Wilton RFC was the strongest of the two clubs.

== Disbanding of the club ==
The sole focus of rugby union meant that Hawick RFC gradually attracted the better rugby players. Although Hawick and Wilton RFC remained a strong club and won both the Hawick and Wilton Sevens and the Hawick Sevens in 1889, the members of the Hawick and Wilton club decided to disband the club in 1890 to solely focus on cricket. Hawick and Wilton Cricket Club remains today.

== Hawick and Wilton Sevens ==
The rugby club began its own Sevens tournament in 1885. It ran to 1889; the club itself folded in Spring 1890 after that season's fixtures and no Sevens tournament was run in 1890. The Hawick Sevens and the Hawick and Wilton Sevens were two distinct tournaments; the Hawick and Wilton Sevens founded first in 1885, the Hawick Sevens founded in 1886. By a quirk of fate in the period that both tournaments co-existed they shared similar winners.

The Hawick and Wilton Sevens was the fourth rugby sevens tournament in the world:- behind the Melrose Sevens (1883); the Gala Sevens (April 1884) and the Selkirk Cricket Club Sevens (May 1884).

== Honours ==
- Hawick and Wilton Sevens
  - Champions (1) : 1889
- Hawick Sevens
  - Champions (1): 1889
