= James McKendrick (rugby union, born 1864) =

Scotland international rugby union player

- Born: James Grierson McKendrick; 8 August 1864 Carluke, Scotland
- Died: 16 August 1938 (aged 74) Edinburgh, Scotland

Rugby union career
- Position: Forward
Amateur team(s)
Years	Team	Apps	(Points)
- West of Scotland
International career
Years	Team	Apps	(Points)
1889	Scotland	1	(0)

James McKendrick (8 August 1864 – 16 October 1938) was a Scotland international rugby union player.

== Rugby Union career ==
=== Amateur career ===
He played for West of Scotland.

=== International career ===
McKendrick was capped just the once for Scotland, in 1889 against Ireland at Belfast.

== Family ==
His father was James Grierson McKendrick (1826-1896), his mother was Margaret Gibson (1826-1906).

He married Caroline Laidlaw (1871-1937) in Edinburgh in 1864. They had 6 children, but not all survived infancy.
