= Walter Irvine =

Scotland international rugby union player

- Born: Thomas Walter Irvine; 21 October 1865 Chapel of Garioch, Aberdeenshire, Scotland
- Died: 26 January 1919 (aged 53) Peshawar, British India
- University: Edinburgh University

Rugby union career
- Position: Forward
Amateur team(s)
Years	Team	Apps	(Points)
1882-89	Edinburgh Academicals		
Provincial / State sides
Years	Team	Apps	(Points)
1883-90	Edinburgh District		
1885-89	East of Scotland District		
International career
Years	Team	Apps	(Points)
1885-89	Scotland	11	(0)

Walter Irvine (21 October 1865 – 26 January 1919) was a Scotland international rugby union player. He became a surgeon and was a Lieutenant Colonel in the Indian Medical Service.

== Rugby Union career ==
=== Amateur career ===
Irvine played rugby union for Edinburgh Academicals.

=== Provincial career ===
He was capped by Edinburgh District to play in the inter-city match of 1883 and 1884 and captained the side in 1890. However, the Glasgow Herald report of the match fuzzily quotes him as 'T.W. Walter' of Edinburgh Academicals.

He played for the East of Scotland District in January 1885, February 1886, and 1889.

=== International career ===
He played 11 matches for Scotland from 1885 to 1889.

It was said that only two other players could rank with him as a tackling forward: Mark Coxon Morrison and Bob Ainslie.

The 1886 Scotland match with England offered Irvine a try-scoring opportunity to win the game, when he attempted to catch a low off-load from a Charles Reid break; however, Irvine failed to collect the ball. The match then ended in a draw.

Fittingly it was another of Scotland's prodigies that endeavoured to win the match for his side. Only a man of Charles Reid's physique and power could have broken through the English defence as Reid did in the second half. From midfield it was a single-handed break clear of the forwards and straight through the English three-quarter line. You saw only two men on the field, the gigantic figure bearing down on his old schoolmate, Charles Sample, the English back. Then another flashed into view, and you saw Reid throw the ball down from his great height, hard and low, and Walter Irvine failing to pick it up on the run. So little often lies between the winning and losing of a match.

== Medical and military career ==
Irvine studied medicine at the University of Edinburgh. He graduated with a Bachelor of Medicine (B.M.) and Master of Surgery. (C.M.) in 1887.

Irvine joined the Indian Medical Service in 1891. He became a Major in 1903 and a Lieutenant Colonel in 1911. He became Chief Medical Officer for the North-West Frontier Province, then in India but now in Pakistan.

In 1902, he became a civil servant. He joined the Foreign Department of Indian Government and worked on the Seistan Arbitration Commission, which formalised the boundaries between Persia and Afghanistan.

In 1907, he became the resident surgeon of Udaipur district in Mewar, Rajputana. He also acted as senior surgeon to the Government of Maisur, now known as Mysuru.

He served in the Third China War, the Boxer Rebellion, and received the China War Medal of 1900. In January 1911, he received the Kaisar-i-Hind Medal medal, (gold) 1st class.

== Death ==
He died on 26 January 1919. He was accidentally drowned in the Naguman River branch of Kabul River while hunting with the Peshawar Vale Hunt at Peshawar of which he was Master. His grave is in the Peshawar Tehkal Cemetery or Gora Qabristan. He is commemorated at the Delhi memorial India Gate.
