= James Fraser (rugby union) =

Scotland international rugby union player

- Born: James William Fraser; 30 May 1859 Kingston upon Hull, England
- Died: 21 January 1943 (aged 83) Kingston upon Hull, England

Rugby union career
- Position: Forward
Amateur team(s)
Years	Team	Apps	(Points)
- Edinburgh Institution F.P.
International career
Years	Team	Apps	(Points)
1881	Scotland	1	(0)

James Fraser was a Scotland international rugby union player.

== Rugby Union career ==
=== Amateur career ===
He played for Edinburgh Institution F.P.

=== International career ===
He was capped just the once for Scotland, in 1881.

== Medical career ==
Fraser became a doctor. He became the first full time medical officer to the Hull Education Authority. He maintained that post till he retired in 1926.

== Other interests ==
He was greatly interested in the Hull Subscription Library. He was also very involved with the youth of the city, and was a chairman of the local Young People's Institute.

== Family ==
He was the eldest son of Evan Fraser (1826–1906), a Scottish doctor from Duddingston; and Sarah Hewat (born 1829) from Portobello. Evan Fraser and Sarah Hewat moved to Hull shortly after their marriage in 1858 – and he became chairman of the Hull Health committee. The Evan Fraser hospital in Hull bore his name. The hospital specialised in infectious diseases; notably smallpox. James was one of five children the couple had.

James Fraser married Rose Thorney in 1883. Miss Thorney was the daughter of the Hull city coroner. They had a daughter, Dorothy, in 1885. James outlived his wife, who died in 1927, and his daughter, who died in 1941. He died in the Victoria Nursing Home in 1943, leaving £7,511 and 2 shillings in his estate.
