= John Alexander Neilson =

Scotland international rugby union player

John Neilson
- Born: John Alexander Neilson; 14 June 1858 Glasgow, Scotland
- Died: 16 July 1915 (aged 57) Greenock, Scotland
- Notable relative(s): Tom Neilson, brother

Rugby union career
- Position: Forwards
Amateur team(s)
Years	Team	Apps	(Points)
- West of Scotland
–	Glasgow Academicals		
Provincial / State sides
Years	Team	Apps	(Points)
- Glasgow District
International career
Years	Team	Apps	(Points)
1878-79	Scotland	2	(0)

John Neilson (14 June 1858 – 16 July 1915) was a Scottish international rugby union player. He played as a forward.

He played for West of Scotland before moving on to Glasgow Academicals.

He was called up for the Glasgow District side for the 1874 provincial match against Edinburgh District on 5 December 1874 while still with West of Scotland. He also played in Glasgow's first winning side against Edinburgh in 1881.

He was called up to the Scotland squad in March 1878 and played England at The Oval on 4 March 1878. He was also called up the following year for the England match at Raeburn Place, Edinburgh on 10 March 1879. At the time of his international caps he was playing for Glasgow Academicals.

His brother Tom Paterson Neilson also played rugby union for Glasgow District and Scotland.
