= Bryan Gossman =

Scotland rugby union player (1951–2022)

- Born: Bryan Murray Gossman; 5 May 1951 Ardrossan
- Died: 28 October 2022 (aged 71)
- School: Ardrossan Academy
- University: Strathclyde University
- Notable relative: Jimmy Gossman (brother)
- Occupation: Wealth management

Rugby union career
- Position: Fly-half
Amateur team(s)
Years	Team	Apps	(Points)
1970-72	Ardrossan Academicals		
1972-84	West of Scotland		
Provincial / State sides
Years	Team	Apps	(Points)
- Glasgow District
International career
Years	Team	Apps	(Points)
1979-80	Scotland 'B'	2	(0)
1980–83	Scotland	3	(6)

Bryan Murray Gossman (5 May 1951 – 28 October 2022) was a Scotland international rugby union player. He played as a fly-half.

== Rugby Union career ==
=== Amateur career ===
He studied at Ardrossan Academy when leaving initially played for their former pupils side Ardrossan Academicals.

He joined West of Scotland in 1972, where he played for the remainder of his career.

=== Provincial career ===
He played for Glasgow District.

=== International career ===
He was capped for Scotland 'B' on 1 December 1979 against Ireland, playing alongside his brother Jimmy Gossman.

Bryan Gossman gained 3 caps for Scotland, from 1980 to 1983, scoring 2 drop goals, 6 points on aggregate. He played all these games at the Five Nations Championship, one in 1980 and two in 1983, when he scored his two drop goals.

== Business career ==
Gossman graduated in economics and economic history from the University of Strathclyde.

He became a trainee bank manager at the Saltcoats Bank of Scotland, before moving on to Bristol and West and then the Dunfermline Building Society.

He later became a senior partner at St James's Place Wealth Management.

He became the treasurer of the North Ayrshire Conservatives. A short-lived related group called the Irvine Unionist Club were fined £400 for not declaring £100,000 gifted to the Scottish Conservative campaign in 2016 via the North Ayrshire Conservative and Unionist Association, after a 'dark money' investigation. Gossman had stated the money went to 'the central party in Edinburgh'. A motion was raised in the Scottish Parliament for the Conservatives to explain the cash donation by the Green MSP Ross Greer.

== Family ==
His brother Jimmy Gossman was also capped for Scotland.

== Death ==
Gossman died on 28 October 2022, aged 71.
