= Jimmy Gossman =

Scotland international rugby union player

- Born: James Stockbridge Gossman; 25 September 1955 (age 71) Irvine, Scotland
- Notable relative(s): Bryan Gossman, brother

Rugby union career
- Position: Centre
Amateur team(s)
Years	Team	Apps	(Points)
- West of Scotland
Provincial / State sides
Years	Team	Apps	(Points)
- Glasgow District
International career
Years	Team	Apps	(Points)
1979-80	Scotland 'B'	2	(0)
1980	Scotland	1	(0)

Jim Gossman (born 25 September 1955) is a former Scotland international rugby union player.

== Rugby Union career ==
=== Amateur career ===
He played for West of Scotland FC.

He played for a Saltires side in the Melrose Sevens in 1980; they beat Clarkston in the First Round 22–14, and beat Cambuslang 24–0 in the Second Round, but were beaten in the semi-finals by Melrose 20–10.

=== Provincial career ===
He played for Glasgow District.

=== International career ===
He was capped for Scotland 'B' twice, his first cap against Ireland 'B' on 1 December 1979.

He was capped for Scotland once in 1980, against England.

== Family ==
His brother Bryan Gossman was also capped for Scotland.
