= 1891–92 Scottish Districts season =

Rugby union competition

- Countries: Scotland
- Date: 1891–92
- Matches played: 1

The 1891–92 Scottish Districts season is a record of all the rugby union matches for Scotland's district teams.

== History ==
In September, new scoring was introduced throughout Scotland, England, Ireland and Wales. The Scottish Referee newspaper was disdainful of the changes; stating that although they were a step in the right direction, the changes did not go far enough. It concluded:

Indeed, the whole system of scoring as adopted is a survival of the time - the stupid time - when one goal was considered of greater value than any number of tries.

This is the first season that Glasgow District was scheduled to play South of Scotland District; and that Edinburgh District was again scheduled to play North of Scotland. Prior to this year, Glasgow always played North of Scotland District; and Edinburgh always played South of Scotland District.

However both matches, due to be played on 14 December, were called off on account of frost.

The North v Midlands match of 28 November 1891 at North Inch, Perth was called off due to heavy rainfall.

The North v Midlands match of 2 January 1892 at North Inch, Perth was postponed.

North and South were due to play on Monday 18 January 1892 at Raeburn Place in Edinburgh.

East and West played their Trial match on 23 January 1892. Admission was noted as 1 shilling.

== Results ==
Date	Try	Conversion	Penalty	Dropped goal	Goal from mark	Notes
1891–1894	2 points	3 points	3 points	4 points	4 points	

=== Inter-City ===
5 December 1891

Glasgow District	6 - 2	Edinburgh District
Try: Woodburn; Drop: Cameron	Report	Try: Easterbrook

Hamilton Crescent, Glasgow
Referee: David Morton

Glasgow District:
Edinburgh District:

=== Other Scottish matches ===
28 November 1891

Midlands District	cancelled	North of Scotland District
	Preview

North Inch, Perth

Midlands District:
North of Scotland District:

12 December 1891

South of Scotland District	Cancelled	Glasgow District
	Preview

Forthill, Dundee

South of Scotland District:
Glasgow District:

12 December 1891

North of Scotland District	Cancelled	Edinburgh District
	Preview

Forthill, Dundee

North of Scotland District:
Edinburgh District:

18 January 1892

North of Scotland District	cancelled	South of Scotland District
	Preview

Raeburn Place, Edinburgh

North of Scotland District:
South of Scotland District:

23 January 1892

East of Scotland District	0 - 9	West of Scotland District
	Report; Report	Try: 3 tries Con: 1 conversion

Raeburn Place, Edinburgh

East of Scotland District:
West of Scotland District:

=== English matches ===
No other District matches played.

=== International matches ===
No touring matches this season.
