= William Peterkin =

Scotland international rugby union player

- Born: William Arthur Peterkin; 31 December 1857 Edinburgh, Scotland
- Died: 22 March 1945 (aged 87) High Wycombe, England

Rugby union career
- Position: Forward
Amateur team(s)
Years	Team	Apps	(Points)
- Edinburgh University
Provincial / State sides
Years	Team	Apps	(Points)
1880	Edinburgh District		
1881	East of Scotland District		
International career
Years	Team	Apps	(Points)
1881-85	Scotland	8	

William Peterkin (1857–1945) was a Scotland international rugby union player and athlete.

== Rugby Union career ==
=== Amateur career ===
He played for Edinburgh University RFC. He captained the side.

=== Provincial career ===
He played for Edinburgh District in the 1880 inter-city match, scoring two tries in the match.

He played for East of Scotland District in the 5 February 1881 match against West of Scotland District.

=== International career ===
He was capped eight times for Scotland between 1881 and 1885.

== Other sports ==
He was named in The Athletic News of 6 July 1881. The newspaper decried his slump in the shot put remarking that last year [1880] he putted the 'cannonball' a distance of 39 feet 6 inches (12.04 m) while this year he only managed a distance of 37 feet 2 inches (11.33 m). Likewise his throwing the hammer attracted 87 feet 7 inches (26.70 m); coming in first was H.H. Johnstone in that event with 89 feet 6 inches (27.28 m).

He was a Scottish champion in the 100 yards sprint, and in the quarter mile sprint. He won the 1883 S.A.A.A. Championships in Powderhall in those events; and also came second in the weight putt or shot put. John Smith, the Scotland football internationalist and Edinburgh District full back came in second to Peterkin in the 100 yards sprint.

He was named in the East Committee of the Scottish Amateur Athletics Association in 1888, alongside A. G. G. Asher and Alec Cameron.

== Family ==
Peterkin was one of the ten children of Elizabeth Mitchell Barclay (1823–1901) and William Arthur Peterkin (1823–1906). He had seven sisters and two brothers.

His father was a clerk of the Board of Supervision when that was established after the Poor Law commission; and was a visiting officer of the Poor Houses in Scotland. His father was also connected with the Monks of St Giles, a literary and social body in Edinburgh.

His grandfather was Alexander Peterkin S.S.C., who was the legal agent of the Church of Scotland at the time of disruption; and was acquainted with Sir Walter Scott.

In 1902, he married Anna Maria Baker in Brighton, England.
