= David McCowan =

Scotland international rugby union player

- Born: David McCowan; 8 December 1860 Ayr, Scotland
- Died: 15 May 1937 (aged 76) Glasgow, Scotland

Rugby union career
- Position: Forward
Amateur team(s)
Years	Team	Apps	(Points)
- West of Scotland
Provincial / State sides
Years	Team	Apps	(Points)
1880	Glasgow District		
1881	West of Scotland District		
International career
Years	Team	Apps	(Points)
1880-84	Scotland	10	

49th President of the Scottish Rugby Union
- In office 1928–1929
- Preceded by: Macbeth Duncan
- Succeeded by: Augustus Grant-Asher

Sir David McCowan, 1st Baronet, JP, DL (8 December 1860 – 15 May 1937) was a Scottish insurance broker and Scotland international rugby union player. He later became the 49th President of the Scottish Rugby Union.

== Rugby union career ==
=== Amateur career ===
He played for West of Scotland.

=== Provincial career ===
He played in the inter-city match for Glasgow District in December 1880. He played for West of Scotland District in February 1881.

=== International career ===
He was capped 10 times for Scotland between 1880 and 1884.

=== Administrative career ===
He was President of the Scottish Rugby Union for the period 1928 to 1929.

== Outside of rugby ==
He was President of the Glasgow Unionist Association. He was knighted in 1927, and created a baronet in 1934.

Baronetage of the United Kingdom
New creation	Baronet (of Dalwhat); 1934–1937	Succeeded by David McCowan
