= 1892–93 Scottish Districts season =

Rugby union competition

- Countries: Scotland
- Date: 1892–93
- Matches played: 1

The 1892–93 Scottish Districts season is a record of all the rugby union matches for Scotland's district teams.

== History ==
North of Scotland District listed this season's district matches in September 1892.

Northern Counties Football Union. A meeting of captains and secretaries of clubs this Union was held on Friday in the office of the hon. secretary, and fixed the principal Union matches under, as also those the various club fixtures. The first two matches will be under the auspices of the Union, to enable the committee to select the best team against Galashiels on 8 October. The annual match Ancients v. Moderns on the 24th Inst., probably at Holburn Grounds, is already being looked forward to among the followers of the game, and judgement as to the result of the contest is in favour of the Ancients.

List matches—Ancients v. Moderns, 24 September; Probables v. Improbables, October Ist; Galashiels v. Northern Counties. 8 October; City v. Varsity, 19 November; Midlands v. Northern Counties, 26 November; Glasgow v. Edinburgh, 3 December; North v. Edinburgh, 10 December; South of Scotland v. Glasgow, 10 December; Anglo-Scots v. Scotland. 25 December; Northern Counties v. Perthshire, 2 January; North v. South of Scotland, 14 January; Scotland v. Wales, 4 February; Scotland v. Ireland, 18 February; City v Varsity, 25 February; Merchistonians v. Northern Counties, 4 March; Scotland v. England, 4 March. A general meeting of the Northern Counties’ Union will be hold Friday, 30 September. Secretaries local clubs will please send their card of fixtures for publication.

The 10 December 1892 Match listed above against Edinburgh was later listed as North and Midlands against Edinburgh District. Unfortunately this match was called off due to snow.

Glasgow District beat Edinburgh District in this season's Inter-City match.

West of Scotland District beat East of Scotland District in this season's international trial match. Players from London Scottish, Manchester, Oxford University and Cambridge University made their way into the East and West selections.

A North of Scotland District versus South of Scotland District match was scheduled for 14 January 1893 but called off due to the weather.

The North of Scotland District and the South of Scotland District were reported in The Scottish Referee as feeling that the Scottish Rugby Union was not giving their players a proper estimate in regard to international selection.

== Results ==
Date	Try	Conversion	Penalty	Dropped goal	Goal from mark	Notes
1891–1894	2 points	3 points	3 points	4 points	4 points	

=== Inter-City ===
17 December 1892

Glasgow District	7 - 6	Edinburgh District
Try: Woodburn; Cargill; Con: Wotherspoon	Report	Try: Reddick; Methven; McTier

Hamilton Crescent, Glasgow
Referee: David Morton

Glasgow District:
Edinburgh District:

=== Other Scottish matches ===
26 November 1892

North of Scotland District	1 gl - 0	Midlands District
	Report; Report

North of Scotland District:
Midlands District:

10 December 1892

South of Scotland District	-	Glasgow District
	Preview

Newtown St. Boswells

South of Scotland District:
Glasgow District:

24 December 1892

Cities District	v	Anglos-Scots
	Preview; Report

Hamilton Crescent

Cities:
Anglo-Scots:

21 January 1893

East of Scotland District	4 - 11	West of Scotland District
Try: Leggat; 1 try	Report; Report	Try: Hendry; Robertson; Con: Menzies; Drop: Wilson

Raeburn Place, Edinburgh
Attendance: 3,000
Referee: J. A. Smith

East of Scotland District:
West of Scotland District:

=== English matches ===
12 November 1892

Northumberland	v	South of Scotland District
	Preview; Report

Jesmond Ground

Northumberland:
South of Scotland District:

4 February 1893

Cumberland	v	South of Scotland District
	Preview; Preview

Carlisle

Cumberland:
South of Scotland District:

=== International matches ===
No touring matches this season.
