= West of Scotland F.C. =

Scottish rugby union club, based in Milngavie

Coordinates: 55.934875°N 4.313536°W

West of Scotland
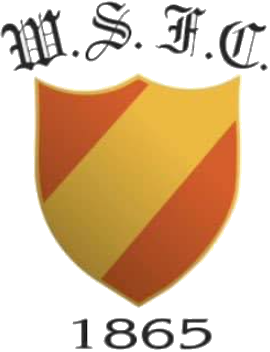
- Full name: West of Scotland Football Club
- Founded: 1865; 161 years ago
- Location: Milngavie, Scotland
- Ground: Burnbrae (Capacity: 2,500)
- President: Ian McDiarmid
- Coach: Trevor Carmichael
- Captain: Hamish Clark
- League(s): Men: Scottish National League Division Three; Women: Scottish Women's West One
- 2025–26: Men: Scottish National League Division Three, 3rd of 10; Women: Scottish Women's National One, 3rd of 7
Team kit

Official website
- www.westofscotlandfc.co.uk

West of Scotland Football Club is a rugby union club based in Milngavie, Scotland. Founded in 1865, West of Scotland are one of the oldest rugby clubs in the world, and one of the founding members of the Scottish Rugby Union. West have enjoyed a long and successful history, winning numerous Scottish Championships and producing an incredible number of international players, and a strong contingent of British and Irish Lions.

During the 1960s and 1970s, West fielded up to ten internationals.West famously developed a pack featuring Gordon Brown, Peter Brown, Sandy Carmichael (2 Lions and the Scotland Captain), all of whom are considered amongst the best rugby players ever produced by Scotland.

In the 'Open Era' of professionalism, West has produced a significant number of players who have progressed to the professional and international levels. The most notable of these is Gordon Bulloch, who enjoyed a professional career playing Glasgow and Leeds, captaining Scotland, and playing for the British and Irish Lions. Later on, Bulloch reportedly rejected a contract offer from the famous French Champions Stade Toulousain to make a return to the 'Red and Yellow'.

A number of other professional players – such as Rob Harley – have emanated from West before going on to higher honours; and a number of current international players pulled on the red and yellow jersey having played for the club through the SRU's pro-player draft.

== Early history (1865–1960) ==
=== Formation ===
Formed in 1865, West of Scotland played a founding role in establishing international rugby in Scotland, and have provided a number of SRU presidents and players. The club originated at Hamilton Crescent in Partick, Glasgow as an offshoot of the Cricket Club. The bye laws of West of Scotland Football Club were agreed on 15 October 1865.

=== First match ===
Initially, West games were 20-a-side intra-club affairs. However, In November 1867, West took to the field against live opposition for the first time – beating Edinburgh Academicals, in one of the first ever rugby matches ever played. West lost the return game at Raeburn Place in December 1867. This remains one of the oldest fixtures in world rugby, and the sides have clashed regularly over the years.

=== Club colours ===
West have played in red and yellow coloured strips since 1871, having elected to discard their old navy strips. The local football club Partick Thistle decided to copy in the 1930s when they also switched from dark blue strips.

=== Founding of the Scottish Rugby Union ===
In 1872 the formation of the Scottish Rugby Union took place at a meeting at Glasgow Academy on Elmbank Street, and the first members were Edinburgh Academicals, West of Scotland, Royal High School FP, Glasgow Academicals, Merchistonians, Glasgow University, St Andrews University and Edinburgh University.

=== Experiment with association football ===
In April 1873, eleven members of the club - using the name Glasgow Wanderers - played Queen's Park F.C. under association football laws, at the original Hampden Park. Although the Wanderers only lost 1–0, their defensive play being particularly praised, and over 1,000 spectators attended, the experiment was not repeated.

=== Early success ===
West twice won the Scottish Unofficial Championship in 1883 and 1885, and provided several players – including captains – to the National side. The club also won four consecutive Scottish Unofficial Championship titles in 1899, 1890, 1891, 1892 (joint), before once more taking the trophy in 1895.

However, despite this outstanding on-field success, the club experienced some off-field strife at this time; largely pertaining the West of Scotland cricket club's incessant demands for more money.

The first world war (1914–18) not only curtailed the club's playing activities – they also decimated many of the local club sides, many of whom never recovered. Nonetheless, despite further issues with the cricket club over the lease, West thrived during this era, fielding up to 4XV's, and featuring many players who play at district and international level.

In 1929 one of rugby's great personalities, W. H. Kidston died. He was responsible, with others for introducing the kicking code to Scotland, in his early days had played for West and, was Honorary Secretary for 18 years, and the first President of West of Scotland FC. Kidston went on to become the President of the SRU. These years also saw people like Bill Nicholson, W. A. Burnet, H. Stewart Mackintosh (later Director of Education for Glasgow ) and Arthur Ferns becoming involved both in playing terms and later in the transfer of West to Burnbrae. Although the club had limited success on the playing field at this time it had a large membership.

=== West's odyssey ===
At the outset of the World War Two (1939–1945), after years of simmering tension, the cricket club cancelled West's lease in Partick – stating that they saw no avenue for the rugby club's return post WWII. It would be 15 years before West found a new permanent home, and this period therefore represented somewhat of an odyssey for the club.

West's first attempted solution was a ground and team-share with Kelvinside Academy FP at Balgray. This was successful for a number of years, but the sheer volume of players rendered it untenable. Therefore, in 1951, West once more began looking for a new home – with club officials A.D. Ferns, M.D. Ballantyne, H.S Mackintosh, W Nicholson, J.A.D. Thom, W.A. Burnet and President Hugh Harper all playing critical roles. The committee considered grounds in Bishopbriggs, Kirkintilloch, Pollok Estate, Stepps, and Whitecraigs, none of which were deemed desirable.

In this period West played their games at a variety of grounds over this period; namely at Old and New Anniesland, Balgray, Glasgow University, and St Aloysius College. Nonetheless, the club continue to thrive – often putting out 6 XV's,

== Later history (1960–present) ==
In 1952 after some 15 years in the wilderness, West purchased the now hallowed ground at Burnbrae in Milngavie – though it would take a further 8 years, and significant effort and expenditure before the first game was played at Burnbrae. The first game was played against local rivals Glasgow High School FP.

=== Golden era (1960s and 1970s) ===
West were an 'open club', meaning that in contrast to the restricted approach of the School's FP clubs, they were open to all players, regardless of background.

This approach means that during the 1960s and 1970s some of the best players in the world graced the Burnbrae turf. West teams in this era featured many Scottish internationals, some of whom went on to star for the British and Irish Lions. Notable players from this era include Sandy Carmichael, Gordon Brown, Peter Brown, and Alastair McHarg, all of whom are considered to be amongst Scotland's best ever players; while Lionel Weston was capped for England. West teams were littered with international players in all positions at this time, and not withstanding the outstanding pack noted above, Burnbrae crowds were dazzled by outstanding international backs such as David Sheddon, Chris Rea, and Quintin Dunlop, as well as England's scrum-half Lionel Weston.

During this golden era the club enjoyed much on-field success, jointly-shared Championship honours with Hawick in 1965, before once more lifting the trophy in 1971.

=== Decline ===
However, this wasn't to last, and West's fortunes somewhat decline when the FP teams opened their clubhouses to non FP's. Indeed. when the official SRU leagues were established however West were in Division 1, fell back to Division 2, before collapsing eventually to Division 3.

=== Rejection of Hawks amalgamation ===
In the 1990s, faced with the Border and Edinburgh teams' domination of Scottish rugby, the great old clubs of Glasgow met to discuss amalgamating so as to compete at a higher level. This led to the origination of Glasgow Hawks, an amalgamation of the Glasgow Academy, High School of Glasgow, and Kelvinside FP clubs (the latter two already having merged into GHK) – each of whom 'donated' letters to the Hawks acronym. The 'W' in Hawks is therefore a vestige of West's potential involvement – although the club decided to reject the move, thus maintaining its independence and history.

=== Resurgence and return to Premiership ===
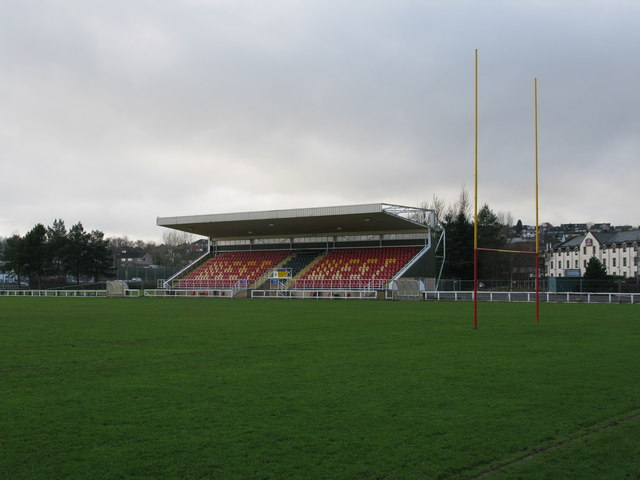
West of Scotland ground pictured in 2013

West's fortunes showed signs of revival when they won the Scottish Shield in 2006. This led to an old-field resurgence for the club, who enjoyed successive promotions from Premiership Division Three, and then Premiership Division Two.

Indeed, it was on Saturday 29 March 2008 that West won Premiership Division Two, thus securing their promotion to Premiership Division One as champions. The 2nd XV and 3rd XV teams also won their leagues, making 2007–08 a historic season for the club.

West of Scotland played in Premiership Division One in 2008–2009, 2009–2010, and 2010–2011. This marked a strong era for the club, with former players such as British and Irish Lion Gordon Bulloch electing to return to club, alongside brother Alan Bulloch, Rory Kerr, and former Glasgow professional Guy Perrett These 'stars' were augmented by a strong crop of West players including Robert Harley, Robert McAlpine, Murray McConell, all of whom progressed to professional rugby, as well as a selection of young Glasgow professional players, selected in the SRU draft (including Peter Horne, Jon Welsh, Richie Vernon and Richie Gray).

West played in Premiership Division Two in season 2011–12 following relegation at the end of the 2010–11 season.

=== Facility upgrade ===
In August 2014, work started on a new Waitrose supermarket, on land purchased from the club. West of Scotland received a new state of the art artificial all-weather pitch from this deal. The supermarket was opened in June 2015, with the new pitch being completed and opened soon after.

== 150th anniversary season (2015) ==
In 2015, West celebrated the 150th year of their existence with a stellar season, which saw all three senior men's teams gain promotion. The First XV, captained by flanker Jamie McAuley, gained promotion to National 2, the third highest league in Scotland.

A West team – augmented by players from the SRU's other founding clubs – also played in an invitational game against fierce local rivals Glasgow Academicals, to commemorate the 150th anniversary of both clubs. The match ended in victory for West in the First XV match, which was precursed by a 'golden oldies' game between FP's of both teams – including British and Irish Lion John Beattie – in which Accies were triumphant.

== Current teams and leagues ==
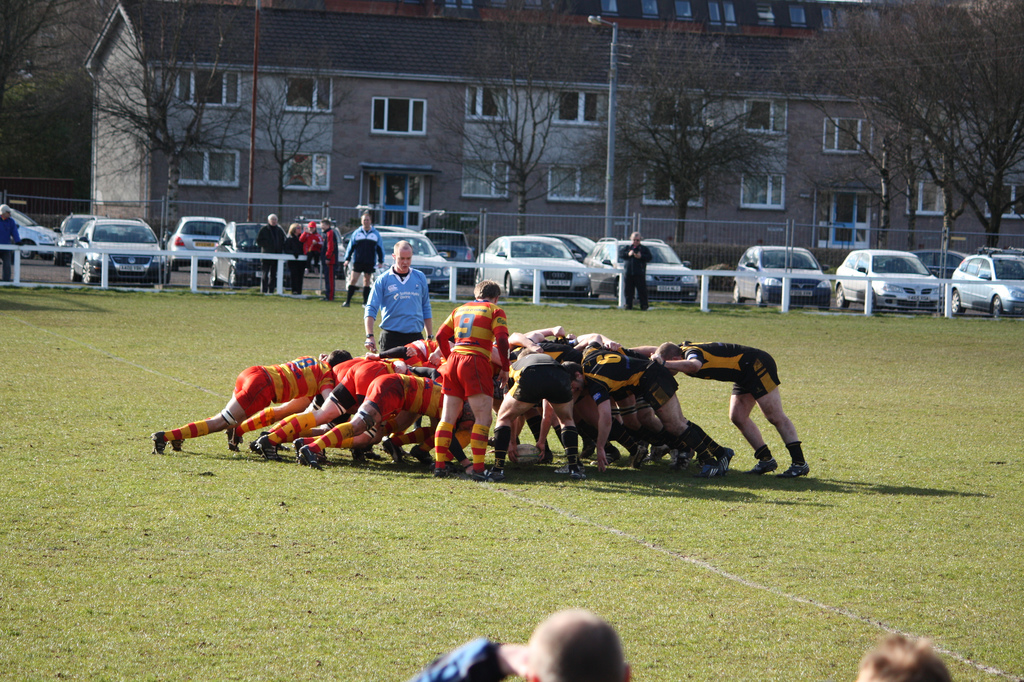
West of Scotland FC (in red and yellow) scrum

West of Scotland's Men's First XV currently play in Scottish National League Division Three; the Women's XV play in the Scottish Women's West One.

The Second XV play in the BT National Reserve League Division 2 – and the 2A XV play in BT West Reserve League Division 1.

The club also have an occasional 'golden oldies' team, known as the Burnbrae Bulls.

=== Youth section ===
West's youth section, founded in the 1980s, is now a development centre with over 200 players. The program makes an effort to 'look at the individuals and develop the person, not just the player'. Notable recent graduates of West's youth programme include: Rob Harley (Glasgow Warriors and Scotland), Robert McAlpine (Glasgow Warriors and Edinburgh Rugby), and Murray McConnell (Glasgow Warriors and Nottingham Rugby).

West's midi sides (S1 – Under 18) play in the 'Presidents Conference', the top division in Scottish Youth Rugby. West's youth set up is therefore extremely well regarded, and West's youth team's have regularly competed for (and won) silverware, including the Scottish Cup on several occasions.

== West of Scotland Sevens ==
The club run the West of Scotland Sevens tournament. The West of Scotland side hold the trophy, after their 'A' side won the trophy in 2022.

== Distinguished players ==
Alexander Robertson, who played in the first ever international, 1871 was the first West of Scotland international cap. Between 1871 and 1914, the club provided over 42 players to the national side. Since then, many other players who have pulled on the famous red and yellow jersey have gone on to represent Scotland, with a number reaching the pinnacle as British and Irish Lions. A selection are listed below:

=== British and Irish Lions ===
- Gordon Brown 30 caps 1969–1976
- Gordon Bulloch 75 caps; Scottish captain and Lion.
- William Patrick Scott, British and Irish Lions and Barbarian F.C.
- Sandy Carmichael (50 caps – and Lion)
- Richie Gray (58 Caps, and 1 Lions Cap) Present

=== Scotland internationals ===
- Quintin Dunlop 1971
- David Sheddon (18 Caps) 1972–1978
- Alastair McHarg (44 Caps) 1968–1979
- Matt Duncan (18 Caps) 1986–89
- James Craig (4 Caps) 1997–2001
- Alan Bulloch (5 Caps) 2000–2001
- Fergus Thomson (6 Caps)
- Andrew Henderson (53 Caps – 8 Tries) 2001–2008
- Robert Harley (18 Caps) 2012–
- Peter Horne (20 Caps) 2013–
- Richie Vernon (25 Caps) 2009–
- Hugh Hamilton
- Jon Welsh (11 Caps)
- Rory Kerr
- Pat McArthur (6 Caps) 2013–
- Peter Brown (27 caps −10 as Captain) – 1964–73
- David Leslie (32 caps) 1975–85
- David Gray (9 caps) 1978–81
- William Wotherspoon. (1891)
- Bill Burnet (8 caps) 1934–36
- Robert Wilson
- James Couper
- David Fisher
- Henry Menzies
- William Hamilton Kidston (1 cap – against England) 1874. President of the SRU 1876–77 and the first President of West of Scotland football club.
- David Cassels (7 caps) 1880–83
- Chris Rea (13 caps) 1968–71 – now a BBC rugby commentator.
- Bryan Gossman (3 caps) 1980–83
- Jimmy Gossman (1 cap) 1980
- Steve Munro (10 caps) 1980–84
- Gerry McGuinness (7 caps) 1982–85
- John Boswell. (1889)
- Tom Paterson Neilson (1874)
- John Alexander Neilson (1878)
- George Neilson (1891)
- Robert Neilson (1891)
- William Thomson
- William Cowie
- John Anderson
- James Dunlop
- William Bolton
- David McCowan
- Alexander Stephen
- George Turnbull
- John Millar
- Norman Kennedy
- James McKendrick
- Jack Shirley(1 cap 30 March 1974)

=== England internationals ===
- Lionel Weston

=== Professional players ===
- Guy Perrett – Edinburgh Rugby
- Murray McConnell – Glasgow Warriors and Nottingham Rugby
- Robert McAlpine – Glasgow Warriors and Edinburgh Rugby

Presidents of the Scottish Rugby Union

- William Hamilton Kidston 1876–77 – and first President of West of Scotland football club.
- Ian McLauchlan
- Bill Nicholson.

== Honours ==
- Scottish National League Division One
  - Champions (2): 1991–92, 2007–08
- Scottish National League Division Two
  - Champions (1): 2006–07
- Scottish National League Division Three
  - Runners-up (1): 2015–16
- Scottish Rugby Shield
  - Winners (1): 2005–06
- Scottish Unofficial Championship
  - Winners (8): 1883, 1885, 1899, 1890, 1891, 1892, 1895, 1965, 1971
- West of Scotland Sevens
  - Champions: 2022
- Glasgow City Sevens
  - Champions (1): 2000
- Earlston Sevens
  - Champions (1): 1999
- Kelso Sevens
  - Champions (1): 2000
- Hyndland Sevens
  - Champions: 1967
- Ardrossan Sevens
  - Champions: 1973, 1974
- Highland Sevens
  - Champions: 1966
- Hillhead HSFP Sevens
  - Champions: 1978, 1979, 1980
- Kilmarnock Sevens
  - Champions: 1982
- Ayr Sevens
  - Champions: 1959, 1962, 1965, 1971, 1973, 1977, 1978
- Glasgow University Sevens
  - Champions: 1959, 1961, 1968, 1976
- Clarkston Sevens
  - Champions: 1965, 1966, 1991
- Strathendrick Sevens
  - Champions: 1989, 1991
- Glasgow Academicals Sevens
  - Champions: 1997

== Bibliography ==
- Bath, Richard (ed.) The Scotland Rugby Miscellany (Vision Sports Publishing, 2007 ISBN 1-905326-24-6)
- Godwin, Terry Complete Who's Who of International Rugby (Cassell, 1987, ISBN 0-7137-1838-2)
- Jones, J.R. Encyclopedia of Rugby Union Football (Robert Hale, London, 1976 ISBN 0-7091-5394-5)
- Massie, Allan A Portrait of Scottish Rugby (Polygon, Edinburgh; ISBN 0-904919-84-6)
