= Scottish Unofficial Championship =

Scottish amateur rugby union league

- Sport: Rugby union
- Founded: 1865
- Folded: 1973
- Replaced by: Scottish League Championship
- No. of teams: 32
- Country: Scotland
- Most titles: Edinburgh Academicals (16 + 4 shared)
- Level on pyramid: 1

The Scottish Unofficial Championship was the top league of Scotland's best amateur rugby union clubs. The Championship was 'unofficial' as the Scottish Rugby Union held that the sport should remain amateur and at the time did not sanction competitive games between the clubs.

== History ==
Numerous forms of football were played in Scotland in the years prior to the introduction of the Rugby rules which were adopted for the boys of Edinburgh Academy in the early 1850s. The game spread to Merchiston and the Royal High School with inter school games beginning in 1858. In 1857 the former pupils of Edinburgh Academy formed the first club in Scotland. The game spread and by the end of the 1860s the Academicals opponents included Edinburgh University, St Andrews University, the Merchistonians, Royal HSFP, West of Scotland FC, Glasgow Academicals, Edinburgh Wanderers and Glasgow University.

=== The basis of the championship ===
As inter club games became more commonplace in the mid-1860s the club with the most successful record in club matches was recognised as the Scottish club champion on an unofficial basis. By the 1870s the Scotsman newspaper would declare the champion Scottish club in its annual review of the football season. The championship was always awarded on the basis of the results between the teams in the championship table only which meant that games against clubs from England or further afield were not counted. Up until 1939 the honour was awarded to the club with the fewest defeats, which led to several seasons where the championship was shared. After 1945 it became more commonplace to determine the champion club based on the percentage of games won.

=== Early years ===
The Edinburgh Academicals won the first five championships by virtue of being undefeated in club games between 1865–66 and 1869–70. The Academicals retained the championship in 1870–71 as a result of having the best record amongst the Scottish clubs despite the loss of two matches. Glasgow Academicals won the inaugural fixture with the Edinburgh Academicals in 1871–72, and, by remaining undefeated in their other fixtures wrested the championship from Edinburgh for the first time.

=== Twentieth century ===
The championship grew over the course of its history as more clubs attained ‘first class status’. In 1909 the championship was contested by eight Edinburgh clubs, seven Glasgow clubs and seven in the Borders. Edinburgh District was represented by Edinburgh Academicals, Royal HSFP, Edinburgh Institution FP, Watsonians, Edinburgh University, Edinburgh Wanderers, Stewarts FP & Heriots FP. The Glasgow District clubs were Glasgow Academicals, Clydesdale, Greenock Wanderers, West of Scotland, Kelvinside Academicals, Glasgow HSFP and Glasgow University whilst the Border representatives were Hawick, Gala, Jed-Forest Melrose, Selkirk, Kelso and Langholm.

Hillhead HSFP joined the championship in 1913–14 which was to be the last championship season for Clydesdale who were unable to continue after the first world war. The championship was unchanged until 1929 when Dunfermline became the first club from the North & Midlands to be included. The 1930s saw St Andrew's University added to the championship in 1936–37, Edinburgh Institution FP renamed as Melville College FP, following the school's relocation in 1937–38, and in 1938–39 Hutcheson's GSFP and Allan Glen's FP ascended to the championship with Allan Glen's heading the table in their first season.

The post war years saw Kelvinside and West of Scotland combine until 1950–51 whilst Musselburgh and Aberdeen GSFP were newcomers to the championship. By the middle of the decade Boroughmuir FP had joined the table with Trinity Academicals, Jordanhill and Ayr following in the 1960s. By 1972–73, the final season prior to the introduction of league rugby, Leith Academicals, Broughton FP and Perthshire were recognised as championship clubs.

== Scottish Unofficial Champions 1865–66 to 1972–73 ==
- 1865–66 Edinburgh Academicals
- 1866–67 Edinburgh Academicals
- 1867–68 Edinburgh Academicals
- 1868–69 Edinburgh Academicals
- 1869–70 Edinburgh Academicals
- 1870–71 Edinburgh Academicals
- 1871–72 Glasgow Academicals
- 1872–73 Glasgow Academicals
- 1873–74 Glasgow Academicals
- 1874–75 Edinburgh Academicals
- 1875–76 Glasgow Academicals
- 1876–77 Edinburgh Academicals & Glasgow Academicals
- 1877–78 Edinburgh Academicals
- 1878–79 Edinburgh Academicals & Glasgow Academicals
- 1879–80 Edinburgh Academicals & Glasgow Academicals
- 1880–81 Edinburgh Institution
- 1881–82 Edinburgh Institution
- 1882–83 West of Scotland
- 1883–84 Royal HSFP
- 1884–85 West of Scotland
- 1885–86 Edinburgh Academicals
- 1886–87 Edinburgh Academicals
- 1887–88 Edinburgh Academicals
- 1888–89 West of Scotland
- 1889–90 West of Scotland
- 1890–91 West of Scotland
- 1891–92 Watsonians & West of Scotland
- 1892–93 Watsonians
- 1893–94 Watsonians
- 1894–95 Watsonians & West of Scotland
- 1895–96 Hawick
- 1896–97 Clydesdale, Jedforest & Watsonians
- 1897–98 Edinburgh Academicals
- 1898–99 Edinburgh Academicals
- 1899–1900 Edinburgh Academicals, Edinburgh University & Hawick
- 1900–01 Edinburgh University
- 1901–02 Edinburgh University & Watsonians
- 1902–03 Edinburgh University & Glasgow Academicals
- 1903–04 Glasgow Academicals
- 1904–05 Glasgow Academicals
- 1905–06 Edinburgh Academicals
- 1906–07 Jedforest
- 1907–08 Edinburgh University
- 1908–09 Hawick & Watsonians
- 1909–10 Watsonians
- 1910–11 Watsonians
- 1911–12 Edinburgh University & Watsonians
- 1912–13 Glasgow Academicals
- 1913–14 Watsonians
- 1919–20 Heriots
- 1920–21 Watsonians
- 1921–22 Glasgow Academicals
- 1922–23 Heriots
- 1923–24 Glasgow Academicals & Glasgow HSFP
- 1924–25 Glasgow Academicals
- 1925–26 Glasgow Academicals
- 1926–27 Hawick
- 1927–28 Heriots
- 1928–29 Heriots
- 1929–30 Edinburgh Academicals
- 1930–31 Dunfermline
- 1931–32 Gala
- 1932–33 Dunfermline & Hawick
- 1933–34 Hillhead HSFP & Royal HSFP
- 1934–35 Watsonians
- 1935–36 Glasgow HSFP
- 1936–37 Hillhead HSFP & Watsonians
- 1937–38 Stewart's College FP
- 1938–39 Allan Glen's
- 1946–47 Stewart's College FP
- 1947–48 Aberdeen GSFP
- 1948–49 Hawick
- 1949–50 Heriots
- 1950–51 Glasgow HSFP
- 1951–52 Melrose
- 1952–53 Selkirk
- 1953–54 Glasgow HSFP
- 1954–55 Hawick
- 1955–56 Edinburgh Academicals
- 1956–57 Gala
- 1957–58 Stewart's College FP
- 1958–59 Langholm
- 1959–60 Hawick
- 1960–61 Hawick
- 1961–62 Glasgow HSFP
- 1962–63 Melrose
- 1963–64 Hawick
- 1964–65 Hawick & West of Scotland
- 1965–66 Hawick
- 1966–67 Melrose
- 1967–68 Hawick
- 1968–69 Jordanhill
- 1969–70 Watsonians
- 1970–71 West of Scotland
- 1971–72 Hawick
- 1972–73 Boroughmuir

== Scottish Unofficial Championship wins by club ==
- Edinburgh Academicals 16 & 4 shared
- Glasgow Academicals 10 & 5 shared
- Hawick 10 & 4 shared
- Watsonians 8 & 7 shared
- West of Scotland 6 & 3 shared
- Heriots 5
- Glasgow HSFP 4 & 1 shared
- Edinburgh University 2 & 4 shared
- Melrose 3
- Stewart's College FP 3
- Edinburgh Institution 2
- Gala 2
- Dunfermline 1 & 1 shared
- Jedforest 1 & 1 shared
- Royal HSFP 1 & 1 shared
- Aberdeen GSFP 1
- Allan Glen's 1
- Boroughmuir 1
- Jordanhill 1
- Langholm 1
- Selkirk 1
- Hillhead HSFP 2 shared
- Clydesdale 1 shared

== The end of the Scottish Unofficial Championship ==
The SRU committee in 1973 decided that the structure of the club game needed changing; and introduced a competitive six league structure for its clubs. This became the first officially sanctioned league structure in the world.

In season 1973-74 the new Scottish League Championship began; the top league of this championship is the Scottish Premiership.
