= Garnock RFC =

Scottish rugby union club, based in Glengarnock

Coordinates: 55.747449°N 4.66887°W

(Scotland) Garnock
- Full name: Garnock Rugby Club
- Union: Scottish Rugby Union
- Founded: 1972; 54 years ago
- Location: Glengarnock, Scotland
- Ground: Lochshore
- President: Gareth McCrorie
- Captain: Jared Reekie
- League: Scottish National League Division Four
- 2025–26: Scottish National League Division Three, 10th of 10 (relegated)
1st kit	2nd kit

Official website
- www.garnockrugbyclub.com

Garnock Rugby Club is an amateur rugby union club based in Glengarnock in Scotland. They currently play in Scottish National League Division Four.

== History ==
The club was formed in 1972 as the result of a merger of the Old Spierians and Dalry High School FP clubs. This was a response to the amalgamation of feeder schools Spier's and Dalry High (along with Kilbirnie Central and Beith Academy) to form Garnock Academy, which happened around the same time. The Old Spierians club had been founded in the early years of the 20th century and joined the Scottish Rugby Union in 1911.

National league competitions were introduced in Scotland in season 1973–74 and Garnock had some initial success, being promoted to Division 3. However, this was followed by a period of decline and in 1986 they were relegated to the Glasgow District League.

During most of this early period, the club did not have a permanent home and played matches in Beith, Dalry and Kilbirnie. In 1985, a new clubhouse and playing fields were built on the site of the former Glengarnock steelworks next to Kilbirnie Loch. After only eight years, the clubhouse was condemned by the local council as being fundamentally unsound and the club had to resort to using Portakabins for changing facilities.

Despite this setback, the 1990s were a period of success for the club, going from National League Division 7 to National League Division 3 in consecutive seasons. In 1999, Garnock were runners-up in the national Bowl competition. Success continued into the next decade, with the team gaining promotion to Premiership Division 3, being runners-up in the Shield in 2007 and winning the same competition in 2008.

In August 2009, the club announced plans to build a new clubhouse at Lochshore.

In June 2021, work began at Lochshore to build a new community hub featuring a café area as well as changing facilities to be used by the rugby clubs and other groups. This opened in September 2022.

== Notable players ==
Centre Ian McInroy played for the club in the 1990s before going on to captain Scotland under-21s and win several caps for the Scotland 7s team.

Winger David Shedden, who played for Old Spierians in the 1960s, won 15 caps for Scotland while playing for West of Scotland.

== Honours ==
- Scottish National League Division Four
  - Champions: 2023–24
- Scottish Rugby Shield
  - Winners: 2007–08
  - Runners-up: 2006–07
- Arran Sevens: 2023
- Greenock Sevens: 2024
