= 1977–78 Scottish Inter-District Championship =

Rugby union competition

- Countries: Scotland
- Date: 1977–78
- Champions: Glasgow / South / Edinburgh
- Runners-up: North and Midlands
- Matches played: 6

The 1977–78 Scottish Inter-District Championship was a rugby union competition for Scotland's district teams.

This season saw the 25th Scottish Inter-District Championship.

South, Glasgow District and Edinburgh District shared the competition with 2 wins and 1 loss each.

== 1977-78 League Table ==
| Team | P | W | D | L | PF | PA | +/- | Pts |
|---|---|---|---|---|---|---|---|---|
| Glasgow District | 3 | 2 | 0 | 1 | 56 | 15 | +41 | 4 |
| South | 3 | 2 | 0 | 1 | 57 | 34 | +23 | 4 |
| Edinburgh District | 3 | 2 | 0 | 1 | 49 | 34 | +15 | 4 |
| North and Midlands | 3 | 0 | 0 | 3 | 7 | 86 | -79 | 0 |

== Results ==
| Date | Try | Conversion | Penalty | Dropped goal | Goal from mark | Notes |
|---|---|---|---|---|---|---|
| 1977–1991 | 4 points | 2 points | 3 points | 3 points | — | |

=== Round 1 ===
25 October 1977

| Glasgow District | 4 – 6 | Edinburgh District |
| | Preview; Report |

Hughenden Stadium
Referee: W. K. Burrell (Gala)

Glasgow District: C. D. R. Mair (West of Scotland), T. Dunlop (West of Scotland), W. V. Dobbs (Kilmarnock), R. B. Campbell (Kilmarnock),
David Shedden (West of Scotland), B. M. Gossman (West of Scotland), H. R. McHardy (Kilmarnock), J. MacLauchlan (Jordanhill) [captain],
R. H. Allan (Kilmarnock), Hugh Campbell (Jordanhill), J. A. Martin (Jordanhill), D. J. M. Smith (Glasgow HSFP),
J. G. Carswell (Jordanhill), D. S. M. Macdonald (West of Scotland), D. G. Leslie (West of Scotland)
Edinburgh District:

=== Round 2 ===
29 October 1977

| South | 25 – 0 | North and Midlands |
| | Preview; Report |

Riverside Park, Jedburgh
Referee: N. R. Sanson (London Scottish)

South:
North and Midlands:

=== Round 3 ===
10 December 1977

| North and Midlands | 3 – 33 | Glasgow District |
| | Preview; Report |

University Park, St. Andrews
Referee: W. A. Bryce (Edinburgh Northern)

North and Midlands:
Glasgow District:

10 December 1977

| Edinburgh District | 15 – 26 | South |
| | Preview; Report |

Jock's Lodge, Edinburgh
Referee: I. M. L. Thomas (Manchester)

Edinburgh District:
South:

=== Round 4 ===
17 December 1977

| Glasgow District | 19 – 6 | South |
| | Preview; Report |

Hughenden Stadium
Referee: D. I. H. Burnett (Ireland)

Glasgow District:
South:

17 December 1977

| Edinburgh District | 28 – 4 | North and Midlands |
| | Preview; Report |

Myreside
Referee: J. Short (Hawick)

Edinburgh District:
North and Midlands:

== Matches outwith the Championship ==
=== Other Scottish matches ===
11 October 1977

| Glasgow District | – | Anglo-Scots |
| | Preview |

Hughenden Stadium

Glasgow District:
Anglo-Scots:

=== Trial matches ===
7 January 1978

| Blues Trial | - | Whites Trial |
| | Preview |

Murrayfield Stadium

Blues:
Whites:
