= Old Spierians =

Former Scottish amateur rugby union club, based in Beith, North Ayrshire

(Scotland) Old Spierians
- Full name: Old Spierians RFC
- Union: Scottish Rugby Union
- Founded: 1890; 136 years ago
- Disbanded: 1972; 54 years ago
- Location: Beith, Scotland
- Region: North Ayrshire
- Ground(s): Marshalland, Beith
Team kit

Old Spierians RFC was an amateur rugby union club in Beith, North Ayrshire, Scotland. The club no longer exists. In 1972 they merged with Dalry HSFP to form Garnock RFC.

== History ==
=== Speir's School ===
Spier's School in Beith, North Ayrshire, had a school rugby union team. Old Spierians RFC was formed when former pupils of the school team wished to continue playing the sport after their graduation.

The Old Spierians side came into existence in 1890.

There was similarly an Old Spierians cricket club, noted as playing in 1895 against the then current Speir's School cricket side. The women graduates also formed a hockey team of this name.

=== Formation and early history ===
The Old Spierians rugby union side of the former pupils of Spier's School came into existence in 1890.

The team is noted in the Glasgow Herald newspaper of Monday 26 February 1894 as playing Dalry at Beith. Old Speirians won the match with Dalry failing to score. Scorers for the Old Speirians were: 1 goal (dropped by J. Scott) and 4 tries (J. Scott (2), J. A. Macgregor and McDonald (1 each)).

The team is also noted in the Edinburgh Evening News newspaper of Tuesday 25 September 1894 as playing the then current Spier's School at rugby. It notes that the Old Spierians won the match by 1 goal (try and conversion) and 4 tries to Spier's School's tally of 1 goal (try and conversion). Scorers for the former pupil side were Scott (3), Stewart and Gray. For the school Cunningham scored the try and conversion.

In 1900, the Kirkintilloch Herald of Saturday 17 November 1900 noted that the prior Saturday the Old Speirians and Lenzie RFC played out a nil-nil draw at Lenzie.

By 1904, one of the Old Speirians players was selected for the South-West district in an International Trial match at Aberdeen. W. L. Kirkwood is listed in the 10 December match against North, but unfortunately he was not later selected for Scotland. The North side selected was a bit of a misnomer as all the players either came from Glasgow District or Edinburgh District, though admittedly they were slightly based north of the South-West District!

Two of Spier's School notable early pupils left the school before getting to play for Old Spierians. Alex Frew and John Bruce Lockhart both became Scotland international rugby union players; Frew even also managing to play for South Africa.

=== Entry into the Scottish Rugby Union ===
The main founder of the team was noted as the school's maths teacher G. G. H. Johnstone. However – given that he lived until he was 93 and died in 1973 – the act of founding a rugby club in 1890 for former school pupils, when he would have been aged only 10 years old, does seem unlikely.

More likely is that he revived the club around 1905 when he was a maths teacher and was a key driver in the club being accepted into the Scottish Rugby Union in 1911.

Maintaining his connections with the club throughout his life, Johnstone died in 1973, shortly after the club had merged with Dalry HSFP to form Garnock RFC in 1972.

=== First World War ===
By October 1913 they were playing a Glasgow Academicals 'A' side and Uddingston RFC.

The First World War curtailed rugby, but the Old Speirans were back into action quickly after the war ended, playing Glasgow University Officers Training Corps on 4 December 1918.

=== 1920s ===
Old Speirians were now regular features of the newspaper sports pages. On 1 April 1922 they entered a Sevens tournament hosted by Kelvinside Academicals at Balgray, Glasgow. They were placed in the Junior section but managed to get through to the semi-finals where they were beaten by Glasgow Academicals.

In 1927. M. Whiteford was selected for West Counties against South District on 5 November 1927. Counties won the match and Whiteford grabbed the last try.

In 1928 another player was selected for an International trial match. G. Bray was selected for West Counties against North of Scotland in the Dunfermline-based match of 10 November 1928.

=== 1930s and 1940s ===
The side was invited onto another Sevens tournament on 6 April 1935 in the Kilmarnock Sevens. The team was beaten in the first round.

The Second World War once again interrupted rugby. Again in 1946, after the war, Old Speirians were back playing Lenzie and other local teams.

=== 1950s ===
Ian Scott and Linwood Paterson were the two stars of the club at this time. Nevertheless, the club was struggling on the park. In 1953–54 season, the club won 8 matches from 21.

By the 1956–57 season this had improved slightly to 11 wins from 25 matches.

=== Open club ===
In 1960 the club made a decision to become an 'open' side; in other words they no longer restricted their catchment to the former pupils of Spier's School.

From this decision the club grew and they then managed to field 4 rugby teams.

In the 1960s, David Shedden and Alec Wilson were now the stars of the club. Both moved on to West of Scotland. Shedden was later capped by Scotland; Wilson, although named as a substitute for the Scotland team, never made it onto the pitch. However Wilson did make a Scotland 'B' cap.

== Merger ==
The reason for the merger was the closure of Spiers School and Dalry High School and the opening of the new Garnock Academy in Kilbirnie in 1972.

With the closure of the schools providing much of their rugby base, the former pupil sides Old Spierians and Dalry HSFP merged to form Garnock RFC; to emphasis that the new side would provide a gateway to later rugby union for the new Garnock Academy graduates.

== Notable former players ==
=== Scotland internationalist ===
The following former Old Spierians players have represented Scotland at full international level.

- (Scotland) David Shedden

=== Notable non-Scottish players ===
The following is a list of notable non-Scottish international representative former Old Spierians players:

Canada

- (Canada) Linwood Paterson

=== Glasgow District ===
The following former Old Spierians players have represented Glasgow District at provincial level.

- (Scotland) David Shedden

=== South-West District ===
The following former Old Spierians players have represented South West District at provincial level.

- (Scotland) W. L. Kirkwood

=== West Counties ===
The following former Old Spierians players have represented West Counties at provincial level.

- (Scotland) G. Bray
- (Scotland) M. Whiteford
