= David Shedden =

Scotland international rugby union player

- Born: David Shedden; 24 May 1944 Kilwinning, Scotland
- Died: 27 October 2017 (aged 73) Linwood, Scotland
- School: Spier's School

Rugby union career
- Position: Wing
Amateur team(s)
| Years | Team | Apps | (Points) |
- Old Spierians
| – | West of Scotland | | |
Provincial / State sides
| Years | Team | Apps | (Points) |
- Glasgow District
International career
| Years | Team | Apps | (Points) |
| 1972-78 | Scotland | 15 | (8) |

David Shedden (24 May 1944 in Kilwinning – 27 October 2017 in Linwood) was a Scotland international rugby union footballer, who played on the wing. He died in October 2017 aged 73.

== Rugby Union career ==
=== Amateur career ===
Shedden went to Spier's School in Beith. His PE teacher was Campbell Bone, an enlightened and passionate rugby coach in Ayrshire.

Leaving school Shedden then played for Old Spierians before moving on to West of Scotland.

He was part of the West of Scotland team that won the 'unofficial' Scottish championship title in season 1970–71.

His nickname was 'The Spear' due to his distinctive tackling style.

=== Provincial career ===
Shedden was capped for Glasgow District and played in the Scottish Inter-District Championship.

He played for Glasgow District in the 1974-75 Scottish Inter-District Championship in Glasgow's first Inter-District match of the season against South of Scotland; playing his part to ensure a Glasgow 16–15 win that ultimately helped Glasgow share the 1974–75 season's championship title with North and Midlands.

He also played for Glasgow in the 1977–78 Scottish Inter-District Championship. He was part of the side that beat South 19–6 in the final match, again ensuring that Glasgow shared the championship title, this time with South and Edinburgh District.

=== International career ===
He played for Scotland 15 times between 1972 and 1978.

Richard Bath writes of him that:

"As with most great players, their greatness comes in part from their ability to combine with other great players of the era. David Shedden, a flier from the Glasgow's West of Scotland club, was lucky to be playing at the same time as Andy Irvine, one of the great attacking full-backs of all time. A classic speed merchant, Sheddden profited from Irvine's ability to slice through opposing defences, and would regular pop up on the full-back's shoulder to take a final scoring pass. Shedden, who was limited to only 15 caps because his career overlapped with another of Scotland's great wingers Billy Steele, was also defensively astute and went on providing cover when Irvine went on his charging runs upfield... It was not until Tony Stanger won his first cap eleven years later that Scotland had another out-and-out flier to rely on."

He won the Calcutta Cup with Scotland against England at Murrayfield in 1976. Unfortunately he suffered concussion after bravely tackling Andy Ripley of England during the match. While he was on the park however he provided rugby commentator Bill McLaren with one of his top five sporting memories with his counterattack setting up of Alan Lawson's first try that day.

== After rugby ==
Shedden developed dementia in his early 50s. This was thought to be linked to his rugby career as he suffered 13 concussions throughout his rugby career. Shedden's form of dementia was thought to be Chronic Traumatic Encephalopathy (CTE), brought on by the cumulative effect of head trauma. He took part in the Rugby Memories programme for its therapeutic effects.

On his death his former West of Scotland and Scotland international team-mate Sandy Carmichael gave this tribute:

"I used to pull his leg about his thin-ness but he was a brave, brave player."

"In those days, the Scottish selectors had a policy that you had to weigh more than 11 stones to be picked. We knew we'd be weighed at the first District game and we piled keys, coins, anything we could find, into Dave's tracksuit pockets to get the scales over 11 stones. He was a great man."
