= List of international rugby union families =

List of players of rugby union

The following is a list of related people who have played international rugby union.

== Argentina ==
- Felipe Contepomi and Manuel Contepomi; twin brothers
- Ignacio Fernández Lobbe and Juan Martín Fernández Lobbe; brothers
- Juan Fernández Miranda and Nicolás Fernández Miranda; brothers

== Australia ==
- Harald Baker and Snowy Baker; brothers
- Stewart Boyce and Jim Boyce; twins, on left and right wings
- Albert Burge and Peter Burge; brothers - also brothers of rugby league internationals Albert Burge and Laidley Burge
- Brad Burke and Matthew Burke; brothers
- Ernie Carr and Slip Carr; brothers
- Alfred "Ginger" Colton and Tom "Puddin" Colton; brothers
- Clarrie Davis and Gordon Davis; brothers
- Eric Dore and Micky Dore; brothers
- Gary Ella, Glen Ella, and Mark Ella; brothers – Glen and Mark are twins
- Lew Evans and Poley Evans; brothers
- Saia Fainga'a, Anthony Fainga'a and Colby Fainga'a; brother (Saia and Anthony are twins)
- Eric Ford and Jack Ford; brothers
- Kristy Giteau and Matt Giteau; sister and brother
- Anthony Herbert and Daniel Herbert; brothers
- Jake Howard, Pat Howard, and Cyril Towers; Jake is Pat's father; Cyril is Pat's grandfather and Jake's father-in-law
- Bryan Hughes and James Hughes; brothers
- Tom Lawton, Snr, Tom Lawton, Jnr and Rob Lawton; Tom, Snr is Tom, Jnr and Rob's grandfather
- Bob Loudon and Darby Loudon; brothers. The Loudons were the first brothers to both captain their national side at rugby union
- Michael Lynagh and Tom Lynagh; father and son
- Graeme Macdougall and Stuart Macdougall; brothers
- Bill Marrott and Robert Marrott; brothers
- The McLean family: Doug McLean, Sr. was the father of Doug McLean, Jr., Bill McLean, and Jack McLean. These three were all uncles of Jeff McLean and Paul McLean. Bill's son Peter McLean has also represented Australia.
- Jack Meibusch and Lou Meibusch; brothers
- Pat Murphy and William Murphy; brothers
- Brendan Nasser and Josh Nasser; father and son
- Frank Nicholson and Fred Nicholson; brothers
- Iggy O'Donnell and Jack O'Donnell; brothers
- Clarrie Prentice and Ward Prentice; brothers
- Myer Rosenblum and Rupert Rosenblum; father and son
- Frank Row and Norm Row; brothers
- Arnold Tancred, Harry Tancred, and Jim Tancred; brothers
- Brian Cox was the father of Phillip Cox and Mitchell Cox
- Dick Thornett and John Thornett; brothers. A further brother, Ken Thornett, represented Australia at rugby league and water polo
- Colin Windon and Keith Windon; brothers

== Canada ==
- Jamie Mackenzie and Phil Mackenzie; brothers
- Kelly Russell and Laura Russell; sisters
- John Tait and Luke Tait; brothers
- Mike and Dan Pletch; twin brothers

== Chile ==
- Ramón Ayarza was the father of José Ramón Ayarza, Vicente Ayarza and Iñaki Ayarza; brothers
- Emilio Saavedra was the father of Domingo Saavedra and Clemente Saavedra; twins brothers
- Cristián Huerta and Marcelo Huerta; brothers
- José Ignacio Larenas and Juan Pablo Larenas; brothers

== England ==
- Delon Armitage and Steffon Armitage; brothers
- John Birkett and Reg Birkett; John was Reg's son
- Ben Curry and Tom Curry; identical twin brothers
- James Davidson and Joseph Davidson; brothers
- Andy Farrell and Owen Farrell; Andy is Owen's father
- Charles Gibson, George Ralph Gibson, and Thomas Gibson; brothers
- Dick Greenwood and Will Greenwood; Dick is Will's father
- Jonathan Joseph and Will Joseph; brothers
- Alex Lozowski, and Rob Lozowski; Rob is Alex's father
- Francis Luscombe and John Luscombe; brothers
- Cecil Milton, Jumbo Milton, and William Henry Milton; brothers Cecil and Jumbo were sons of William Henry
- Charles Pillman and Robert Pillman; brothers
- Ivor Preece and Peter Preece; Ivor was Peter's father
- Alan Rotherham and Arthur Rotherham; cousins
- Alex Sanderson and Pat Sanderson; brothers
- Edward Scott and Frank Sholl Scott; Edward was Frank's son
- Mason Scott and William Martin Scott; brothers
- Frederick Stokes and Lennard Stokes; brothers
- Frank Stout and Percy Stout; brothers
- Bill Tucker and William Eldon Tucker; Bill was William's son
- Edward Beadon Turner and George Robertson Turner; brothers
- Rory Underwood and Tony Underwood; brothers
- Harry Vassall and Henry Vassall; Harry was Henry's uncle
- Marcus Watson and Anthony Watson; brothers
- Ben Youngs, Nick Youngs, and Tom Youngs; Nick is Ben and Tom's father
- Billy Vunipola and Mako Vunipola; brothers
- Rob Fidler and John Fidler; John is Rob’s father

== Fiji ==
- Bill Cavubati and Tevita Cavubati; brothers
- Jimi Damu and Ilaitia Damu; brothers
- Joeli Lesavua, Apenisa Naevo, Manoa Naevo, and Semisi Naevo; Joeli is the father of the three Naevo brothers
- Tomasi Rabaka, Samisoni Rabaka; brothers
- Taito Rauluni, Jacob Rauluni, Mosese Rauluni and Waisale Serevi; Taito is father of the brothers Jacob and Mosese, who are Waisale's first cousin.
- Aca Ratuva and Vula Maimuri; brothers
- Salesi Ma'afu (Australia), Campese Ma'afu (Fiji), Apakuki Ma'afu (Tonga);brothers
- Ifereimi Rawaqa and Taniela Rawaqa; brothers
- Seremaia Bai and Setareki Koroilagilagi; brothers
- Michael Tagicakibau (Fiji) and Sailosi Tagicakibau (Samoa); brothers
- Tomasi Soqeta and Nemia Soqeta; brothers
- Josh Matavesi and Sam Matavesi; brothers
- Sekonaia Kalou and Apisalome Ratuniyarawa; brothers
- Pio Tuwai Josua Tuisova and Filipo Nakosi half brothers (same father)
- Radike Samo and Ravuamo Samo; brothers
- Kameli Ratuvou and Iliesa Keresoni; brothers
- Waisale Serevi and his daughter, Asinate Serevi.

== France ==
- Laurent Bidart, Jean-Baptiste Élissalde and Jean-Pierre Élissalde; Laurent was Jean-Pierre's father-in-law, Jean-Pierre is Jean-Baptiste's father
- André Boniface and Guy Boniface; brothers
- Didier Camberabero, Guy Camberabero, and Lilian Camberabero; Didier is Guy's son and Lilian's nephew
- Stéphane Castaignède and Thomas Castaignède; brothers
- Arnaud Costes and Paul Costes; Arnaud is Paul's father
- Claude Dourthe, Richard Dourthe, Raphaël Ibañez, and Olivier Magne; Claude is Richard's father and Raphaël and Olivier's father-in-law. NB: Mathieu Dourthe is unrelated
- Julien Laharrague and Nicolas Laharrague; brothers
- Marc Lièvremont, Matthieu Lièvremont, and Thomas Lièvremont; brothers
- Émile Ntamack, Francis Ntamack, Romain Ntamack, and Théo Ntamack; Émile and Francis are brothers, Romain and Théo are Émile's sons and Francis' nephews.
- Alain Penaud and Damian Penaud; Alain is Damian's father
- Aurélien Rougerie and Jacques Rougerie; Aurélien is Jacques' son
- David Skrela and Jean-Claude Skrela; David is Jean-Claude's son
- Claude Spanghero and Walter Spanghero; brothers
- Dimitri Yachvili and Michel Yachvili; Dimitri is Michel's son

== Germany ==
- Domenick Davies and Kieron Davies; brothers
- Guillaume Franke and Matthieu Franke; brothers
- Christopher Liebig and Steffen Liebig; brothers
- Armon Trick and Marcus Trick; brothers
- Dennis Walger and Markus Walger; brothers

== Ireland ==
- Charles Beamish and George Beamish; brothers
- Rory Best and Simon Best; brothers
- Lawrence Bulger and Michael Joseph Bulger; brothers
- Andrew Clinch and Jammie Clinch; father and son
- Des Fitzgerald and Luke Fitzgerald; Des is Luke's father
- Anthony Foley and Brendan Foley; Brendan is Anthony's father
- Arthur Gwynn and Lucius Gwynn; brothers. Two other brothers, John Tudor Gwynn and Robert Gwynn, represented Ireland at cricket
- Arnold Harvey, Duncan Harvey and Frederick Harvey; brothers
- Samuel Irwin and Sinclair Irwin; Samuel was Sinclair's father
- Dave Kearney and Rob Kearney; brothers
- Mike Kiernan, Tom Kiernan and Mick Lane; Mike is the nephew of Tom, and also of Mick Lane.
- James Magee, Joseph Magee, and Louis Magee; brothers. James did not represent Ireland internationally, but did represent the British and Irish Lions
- Kenny Murphy, Noel Murphy jr., and Noel Murphy sr.; Kenny is Noel jr's son and Noel sr's grandson
- Barry O'Driscoll and John O'Driscoll; brothers. Frank O'Driscoll is theis cousin and father of Brian O'Driscoll
- Kevin O'Flanagan and Mick O'Flanagan; brothers
- Cian Prendergast and Sam Prendergast; brothers
- Richard Wallace, Paul Wallace, and David Wallace; brothers
- Arthur Knight Wallis, William Armstrong Wallis, Clive O'Neill Wallis, and Thomas Gill Wallis; Arthur and William were brothers, and were uncles of Clive and Thomas
- Andy Ward and Bryn Ward, father and son
- Gordon Wood and Keith Wood; Gordon was Keith's father
- Joe McCarthy and his brother Paddy McCarthy

== Italy ==
- Arturo Bergamasco, Mauro Bergamasco, and Mirco Bergamasco; Arturo is the father of brothers Mauro and Mirco
- Pier Luigi Bernabò, Valerio Bernabò; father and son
- Ottorino Bettarello, Romano Bettarello, and Stefano Bettarello; Ottorino and Romano were brothers, Romano was the father of Stefano
- Lorenzo Cannone and Niccolò Cannone; brothers
- Marcello Cuttitta and Massimo Cuttitta; twin brothers
- Denis Dallan and Manuel Dallan; brothers
- Bruno Francescato, Ivan Francescato, Nello Francescato and Rino Francescato; brothers
- Elio Fusco, Alessandro Fusco and Alessandro Fusco; Elio and the older Alessandro are father and son, the youger Alessandro is the cousin of Alessandro
- Fabio Gaetaniello and Fabrizio Gaetaniello; brothers
- Alessandro Garbisi and Paolo Garbisi; brothers
- Luigi Luise and Roberto Luise; brothers
- Franco Mazzantini and Matteo Mazzantini; father and son
- Carlo Pratichetti, Andrea Pratichetti and Matteo Pratichetti; Carlo is the uncle of Andrea and Matteo, brothers
- Isidoro Quaglio and Nicola Quaglio; uncle and nephew
- Jacopo Sarto and Leonardo Sarto; brothers
- Daniele Tebaldi and Tito Tebaldi; uncle and nephew
- Eugenio Vinci, Francesco Vinci, Paolo Vinci, Piero Vinci; brothers

== Japan ==
- Lopeti Oto and Nataniela Oto; brothers
- Nofomuli Taumoefolau, Koliniasi Holani and Sioape Latu Holani; Nofomuli is the uncle of brothers Koliniasi and Sioape

== Luxembourg ==
- Martin Abel and Nick Abel; Nick is Martin's son
- Philip Barnard and Tertius Barnard; brothers
- Greg Brittin and Jason Brittin; brothers
- Andrew Browne and Scott Browne; Scott is Andy's son
- Steve Clarke and James Clarke; brothers
- Jean-Claude Da Col and Julian Da Col; Julian is Claude's son
- Ray Fitzpatrick and John Fitzpatrick; John is Ray's son
- Richard Geoffreys, Nick Geoffreys, and Gareth Geoffreys; Gareth and Nick are Richard's sons
- Loic Herve, Fred Herve and Cedric Herve; brothers (XV and VII)
- Romain Kimmel and Guillaume Kimmel; brothers (XV and VII)
- Mike Lowe, Christian Lowe, and Mark Lowe (7s); Christian and Mark are Mick's sons
- Johan Lux and Thibault Lux; brothers
- Marcello Ridolfi and Steve Ridolfi; Steve is Marcello's son
- Rob Rogers and Euan Rodgers; Euan is Rob's son
- Andrew Thompson and Martin Thompson; brothers (XV and VII)
- Alex Van Zeeland and Josh Van Zeeland; Josh is Alex's son (XV and VII)
- Tony Whiteman and Bruce Whiteman; brothers (XV and VII)
- Phill Williams and Rhys Williams; Rhys is Phill's son

== New Zealand ==
- James Archer and Robin Archer; James is Robin's uncle
- John Ashworth and Brodie Retallick; John is Brodie's uncle
- The Bachop-Mauger family: Graeme Bachop and Stephen Bachop (brothers) are both uncles of Aaron Mauger and Nathan Mauger. Stephen's wife was Sue Garden-Bachop. Another uncle of Aaron and Nathan is former world speedway champion Ivan Mauger. Stephen and Sue's son Jackson Garden-Bachop has represented New Zealand at age group level, and their daughter Georgia Garden-Bachop has done the same at hockey. Graeme also represented Japan internationally and Stephen also represented Samoa.
- Beauden Barrett, Kane Barrett, Scott Barrett, Jordie Barrett and Kevin Barrett; Kevin is the father of the brothers Beauden, Kane, Blake, Scott, and Jordie. In June 2018, Beauden, Jordie, and Scott became the first group of three brothers to start in the same test for the All Blacks.
- Kevin Barry, Liam Barry, and Ned Barry; Liam is Kevin's son and Ned's grandson
- Bill Birtwistle, Mark Birtwistle and Beaudene Birtwistle; Mark is Bill's nephew and Beaudene's father. Mark represented Samoa internationally.
- Todd Blackadder and Ethan Blackadder; Todd is Ethan's father
- Daniel Braid and Gary Braid; Gary is Daniel's father. Daniel's brother Luke Braid has represented New Zealand at age-group level
- Robin Brooke and Zinzan Brooke; brothers
- Handley Brown, Henry Brown, and Ross Brown; Handley and Henry were brothers, Ross was Handley's son
- Dan Carter and Bill Dalley; Dan is Bill's great-nephew
- Eric Cockroft and Sam Cockroft; Eric is Sam's nephew
- Alfred Cooke and Reuben Cooke; brothers
- Greg Cooper and Matthew Cooper; brothers
- Andy Dalton and Ray Dalton; Andy is Ray's son
- Bob Deans, Bruce Deans, Robbie Deans, and Jock Hobbs; brothers Bruce and Robbie are grandnephews of Bob. Jock was Bruce and Robbie's brother-in-law
- John Dick and Malcolm Dick; Malcolm is John's son
- Eddie Dunn and Ian Dunn; brothers
- Brian Fitzpatrick and Sean Fitzpatrick; Sean is Brian's son
- Ben Franks and Owen Franks; brothers
- Hosea Gear and Rico Gear; brothers
- Ken Going, Sid Going, and Todd Miller; brothers Ken and Sid are uncles of Todd. Sid's son Jared Going has represented New Zealand at rugby sevens
- Alan Good and Hugh Good; brothers
- Rob Gordon and Steve Gordon; brothers
- Jimmy Haig and Laurie Haig; brothers
- Nathan Harris and Perry Harris; Nathan is Perry's grandson
- Bill Hazlett and Jack Hazlett; Bill is Jack's uncle
- Dave Hewett and Jason Hewett; cousins
- Arthur Hughes and Kevin Skinner; cousins
- Lyn Jaffray and Merv Jaffray; brothers
- Jamie Joseph and Leon MacDonald; second-cousins
- Arthur Knight, Laurie Knight, and Lawrie Knight; Arthur and Laurie are brothers, Lawrie is Laurie's son
- Richard Loe, and Alex Wyllie; Richard is Alex's nephew
- Angus Macdonald and Hamish Macdonald; Angus is Hamish's son
- Hoani MacDonald, Dan Udy, and Hart Udy; Dan and Hart were cousins. Hoani is Dan's great-grandnephew
- Archie McMinn and Paddy McMinn; brothers
- Colin Meads and Stanley Meads; brothers
- Bill Meates and Kevin Meates; brothers
- Andrew Mehrtens and George Mehrtens; Andrew is George's grandson
- Graham Mexted and Murray Mexted; Murray is Graham's son
- Anton Oliver and Frank Oliver; Anton is Frank's son
- Bill Osborne and Glen Osborne; Glen is Bill's nephew
- Walter Pringle and Codie Taylor; Codie is Walter's 2nd great grandson
- Charles Purdue, George Purdue, and Pat Purdue; Charles and Pat were brothers, George was Pat's son
- Henry Roberts and Teddy Roberts; first father and son All Blacks
- Alan Robilliard and Ross Smith; Ross was Alan's nephew
- Isaac Ross and Jock Ross; Isaac is Jock's son
- Annaleah Rush and Xavier Rush; sister and brother
- Julian Savea and Ardie Savea; brothers
- Jack Shearer and Sydney Shearer; brothers
- Exia Shelford, Frank Shelford, and Buck Shelford; Frank is the uncle of cousins Exia and Buck. Further cousins, Adrian Shelford and Darrall Shelford, represented New Zealand and Scotland respectively at rugby league
- Johnny Smith and Peter Smith; brothers
- Dave Solomon, Frank Solomon, and Josh Kronfeld; Dave and Frank were step-brothers, Josh is their grandnephew
- Charles Speight and Michael Speight; Michael is Charles's great-grandson
- George Spencer and John Spencer; brothers
- Bob Stuart, Kevin Stuart and Jim Kearney; Bob and Kevin were brothers and Jim was their cousin
- Murray Taylor, Tom Taylor, and Warwick Taylor; Murray and Warwick are brothers. Tom is Warwick's son
- Alan Whetton and Gary Whetton; twin brothers
- George Whitelock, Luke Whitelock, and Sam Whitelock; brothers. A fourth brother, Adam Whitelock, has represented New Zealand at rugby sevens
- Sonny Bill Williams, and Niall Williams (rugby union), brother and sister
- Fred Woodman, and Kawhena Woodman; brothers
- Daniel Ripata and Seta Tamnivalu and Sione Lauaki; relations

== Portugal ==
- David Mateus and Diogo Mateus; twin brothers
- Vasco Uva and Gonçalo Uva; brothers
- João Uva cousin of Vasco Uva and Gonçalo Uva; cousins

== Romania ==
- Romeo Gontineac and Taylor Gontineac; father and son
- Haralambie Dumitraș and Iulian Dumitraș; father and son
- Viorel Morariu and Octavian Morariu; father and son
- Gheorghe Ion and Adrian Ion; father and son
- Andrei Ursache and Valentin Ursache; brothers

== Samoa ==
- Census Johnston and James Johnston; brothers
- Lolani Koko, Kofe Koko and Ali Koko; Lolani is Kofe's brother and Ali's uncle
- Jack Lam and Pat Lam; cousins
- Trevor Leota and Va'aiga Tuigamala; second cousins. Tuigamala played internationally for both Samoa and New Zealand

== Scotland ==
- Robert Ainslie and Thomas Ainslie; brothers
- Allen Arthur and John Arthur; brothers
- John Beattie and Johnnie Beattie; John is Johnnie's father. Johnnie's sister Jen Beattie plays football for Scotland
- David Bedell-Sivright and John Bedell-Sivright; brothers
- Alastair Biggar and Mike Biggar; cousins
- Alasdair Boyle and Cameron Boyle; brothers
- Gordon Brown and Peter Brown; brothers. Gordon and Peter's father John Brown played football for Scotland, and their uncle Jim Brown played football for the United States
- John Bruce-Lockhart, Logie Bruce Lockhart, and Rab Bruce Lockhart; John was Rab and Logie's father
- Alan Bulloch and Gordon Bulloch; brothers
- Jim Calder, Finlay Calder, and Lewis Calder; Jim and Finlay are brothers, Lewis is Jim's son
- Angus Cameron and Donald Cameron; brothers
- Jeremy Campbell-Lamerton and Mike Campbell-Lamerton; Jeremy is Mike's son
- James Stewart Carrick and Thomas Chalmers; brothers-in-law
- Craig Chalmers and Paula Chalmers; brother and sister
- David Chisholm and Robin Chisholm; brothers
- George Crabbie and John Crabbie; brothers
- Gerard Crole and Phipps Turnbull; half-brothers
- Malcolm Cross and William Cross; brothers
- Francis Dods and John Dods; brothers
- Michael Dods and Peter Dods; brothers. NOTE: Michael and Peter are not related to Francis and John Dods
- Andrew Dykes and Jimmy Dykes; brothers
- Arthur Dorward and Tom Dorward; brothers. Arthur and Tom are distantly related to New Zealand international Ali Williams
- Christy Elliot and Tom Elliot; brothers
- Max Evans and Thom Evans; brothers
- Zander Fagerson and Matt Fagerson; brothers
- Arthur Finlay, James Finlay, and Ninian Finlay; brothers
- Alastair Fisher and Colin Fisher; Alastair was Colin's father
- Irvine Geddes and Keith Geddes; Irvine was Keith's father
- Henry Gedge and Peter Gedge; Henry was Peter's father
- Cameron Glasgow and Ron Glasgow; Cameron is Ron's son
- Brian Gossman and Jimmy Gossman; brothers
- Derrick Grant and Oliver Grant; brothers
- Jonny Gray and Richie Gray; brothers
- Gavin Hastings, Adam Hastings and Scott Hastings; Gavin and Scott are brothers. Adam is Gavin's son.
- Brian Hegarty and John Hegarty; Brian is John's son
- Ian Henderson and Mac Henderson; brothers
- Ben Hinshelwood and Sandy Hinshelwood; Ben is Sandy's son
- Graham Hogg and Stuart Hogg; brothers. Graham and Stuart are distantly related to Northern Ireland footballer George Best.
- Peter Horne and George Horne; brothers
- Bob Howie and Dave Howie; brothers
- Bulldog Irvine and Duncan Irvine; brothers
- Roy Laidlaw, Clark Laidlaw, and Greig Laidlaw; Roy is Greig's uncle and Clark is Roy's son.
- Rory Lamont and Sean Lamont; brothers
- Alan Lawson, Gregor Lawson, Rory Lawson, and Jim Thompson; Alan is Rory and Gregor's father, and Jim Thompson's uncle. He is also the son-in-law of Scottish rugby commentator Bill McLaren
- John Leslie and Martin Leslie; brothers
- George Buchanan McClure and James Howe McClure; twin brothers. They were the first twins to both gain international caps at rugby union
- Duncan MacGregor and John MacGregor; brothers
- K. G. MacLeod and Lewis MacLeod; brothers
- Gardyne Maitland and Robert Maitland; brothers
- Thomas Roger Marshall and William Marshall; brothers
- Bill McEwan and Saxon McEwan; brothers
- David Milne, Iain Milne, and Kenny Milne; brothers
- George Murray and Ronald Murray; brothers
- George Neilson, Gordon Neilson, Robert Neilson, and Willie Neilson; brothers
- Andy Nicol and George Ritchie; Andy is George's grandson
- Charles Orr and John Orr; brothers
- Alex Purves and William Purves; brothers
- Bryan Redpath and Cameron Redpath; Bryan is Cameron's father
- Charles Reid and James Reid; brothers
- Keith Robertson and Mark Robertson; Keith is Mark's father
- Edward Ross and James Ross; brothers
- Ian Shaw and Robert Wilson Shaw; brothers
- Brian Simmers and Max Simmers; Brian is Max's son
- Allen Sloan and Donald Sloan; Allen was Donald's father
- Charles Stuart and Ludovic Stuart; brothers
- Alec Valentine and Dave Valentine; brothers
- Gordon Waddell and Herbert Waddell; Gordon was Herbert's son
- Archibald Walker and James Walker; brothers
- Frank Waters and Joseph Waters; Frank was Joseph's son

== South Africa ==
- Geo Cronjé and Jacques Cronjé; brothers
- Bismarck du Plessis and Jannie du Plessis; brothers
- Carel du Plessis, Willie du Plessis and Michael du Plessis; brothers
- Felix du Plessis and Morné du Plessis; Felix is Morné's father. They are the only father and son to have captained the South African national team (NOTE: Felix and Morné are not related to any of the du Plessis above)
- Robert du Preez, Jean-Luc du Preez, Dan du Preez, and Robert du Preez jr; Robert is Jean-Luc, Dan, and Robert jr's father. Jean-Luc and Dan are twins
- Schalk Burger and Schalk Burger; Father and Son
- Francois Louw and Jan Pickard; Francois is Jan's grandson
- Gerhard Morkel and Jacky Morkel; brothers
- Akona Ndungane and Odwa Ndungane; twin brothers
- Gysie Pienaar and Ruan Pienaar; Gysie is Ruan's father
- Jaco Reinach and Cobus Reinach; Jaco is Cobus' father
- Chris Rossouw and Pieter Rossouw; brothers
- Jan Serfontein and Jack Slater; Jack is Jan's grandfather. Boela Serfontein (Jan's older brother) is also a provincial rugby player, as was their father, Boelie Sefontein
- Flip van der Merwe and Flippie van der Merwe; Flip is Flippie's son
- Moaner van Heerden and Wikus van Heerden; Moaner is Wikus's father
- Hasie Versfeld and Oupa Versfeld; brothers
- Avril Williams and Chester Williams; Avril is Chester's uncle
- Roy McCallum 1970 to 1974, played 11 matches as fullback for the Springboks and Ian McCallum, one test for the Springboks, the first test against the 1974 British Lions at Newlands in Cape Town and in his debut test at scrum half, his brother was playing fullback: brothers, both born in Kitwe Northern Rhodesia.

== Spain ==
- Daniel Ripol, Oriol Ripol and Roger Ripol; brothers
- Alberto Socías and Antonio Socías; brothers
- Carlos Souto and Sergio Souto; twin brothers

== Tonga ==
- Inoke Afeaki and Stanley Afeaki; brothers. They are second cousins of New Zealand representative Ben Afeaki
- Penieli Latu and Sinali Latu; brothers. Sinali also represented Japan internationally
- Johnny Ngauamo and Milton Ngauamo; brothers
- David Palu and Tomasi Palu; brothers
- Hudson Tongaʻuiha and Soane Tongaʻuiha; brothers

== United States ==
- Nic Johnson and Fred Paoli; Johnson is Paoli's nephew
- Andrew Suniula, Roland Suniula, and Shalom Suniula; brothers
- Alipate Tuilevuka and Seta Tuilevuka; brothers

== Wales ==
- Billy Bancroft and Jack Bancroft; brothers
- Arthur Bassett and Jack Bassett; brothers
- Norman Biggs and Selwyn Biggs; brothers
- Aled Brew and Nathan Brew; brothers
- Arthur Cornish and Fred Cornish; Arthur was Fred's nephew
- Harry Day and Harry Phillips; Day was Phillips' uncle
- Tom Day and Billy Trew; Tom was Billy's son-in-law
- Jonathan "Fox" Davies and James Davies; brothers
- Sam Davies and Nigel Davies; Nigel is Sam's father
- Willie Davies and Haydn Tanner; cousins
- George Dobson and Tom Dobson; brothers
- John Dyke and Louis Dyke; brothers
- Billy Gore and Jack Gore; Billy was Jack's son
- Arthur Gould, Bert Gould, and Bob Gould; brothers. A further brother, Wyatt Gould, represented the United Kingdom at athletics
- David Gwynn and William Gwynn; brothers
- George Frederick Harding and Theo Harding; brothers
- Bert Hollingdale and Thomas Hollingdale; brothers
- David James and Evan James; brothers
- Barry John, Craig Quinnell, Derek Quinnell, and Scott Quinnell; Derek is Barry's brother-in-law and Craig and Scott's father
- Gwyn Jones and Ivor Jones; Gwyn is Ivor's great-nephew
- Howell Jones and Howie Jones; Howell was Howie's father
- Jack Jones, Ponty Jones, and Tuan Jones; brothers
- Will Joseph and Dicky Owen; cousins
- Gareth Llewellyn and Glyn Llewellyn; brothers
- Willie Llewellyn and Tom Williams; Willie was Tom's nephew
- Andy Moore and Steve Moore; brothers
- Guy Morgan, Teddy Morgan, and William Llewellyn Morgan; Guy was the nephew of brothers Teddy and William
- Paul Moriarty, Richard Moriarty, and Ross Moriarty; Paul is Richard's brother and Ross's father
- Charles Nicholl and David Nicholl; brothers
- Gwyn Nicholls, Sydney Nicholls, and Bert Winfield; brothers Gwyn and Sydney were brothers-in-law of Bert. Sydney's son Jack Nicholls represented Wales at football
- Dai Parker and Tom Parker; brothers
- Rowland Phillips and Brian Thomas; Rowland is Brian's son-in-law
- Dai Prosser and Glyn Prosser; brothers
- Jamie Ringer and Paul Ringer; Jamie is Paul's son
- Jamie Robinson and Nicky Robinson; brothers
- David Samuel and John Samuel; brothers
- Tom Shanklin and Jim Shanklin; Tom is Jim's son
- Glyn Stephens and Rees Stephens; Glyn was Rees's father
- Anthony Sullivan and Clive Sullivan; Anthony represented Wales at both rugby union and rugby league and Clive represented Wales at rugby league
- Bunner Travers and George Travers; Bunner was George's son
- Bernard Turnbull and Maurice Turnbull; brothers
- Harry Wetter and Jack Wetter; brothers
- Bleddyn Williams and Lloyd Williams; brothers. Note: the two Lloyd Williamses, here and lower in the list, are unrelated
- Brynmor Williams and Lloyd Williams; Brynmor is Lloyd's father. Note: the two Lloyd Williamses, here and higher in the list, are unrelated
- Gareth Powell Williams and Owain Williams; brothers
- Matthew Wintle and Richard Wintle; brothers
- Thomas Young and Dai Young; Dai is Thomas's father. Thomas is also brother-in-law to Ross Moriarty and son-in-law to Paul Moriarty.

== Zimbabwe ==
- Kennedy Tsimba and Richard Tsimba; brothers

== Different countries ==
- Vili Alaalatoa and Michael Alaalatoa (both Samoa), and Allan Alaalatoa (Australia); Vili is Allan and Michael's father
- John Allan (Scotland and South Africa) and Tommaso Allan (Italy); John is Tommaso's uncle. Tommaso has also represented Scotland at under-17, under-18 and under-20.
- Tomasi Cama (Fiji) and Junior Tomasi Cama (New Zealand); Tomasi is Junior's father
- Brent Cockbain (Wales) and Matt Cockbain (Australia); brothers
- Jerry Collins (New Zealand), Mike Umaga (Samoa), and Tana Umaga (New Zealand), and Jacob Umaga (England); Mike and Tana are brothers, Jerry was their cousin and Jacob is Tana’s nephew and was capped by England in 2021.
- Quade Cooper (Australia) and Sean Maitland (Scotland); cousins (see also the Stanley family, below)
- Blair Cowan (Scotland) and Pekahou Cowan (Australia); cousins
- Ross Cronjé (South Africa) and Guy Cronjé (Zimbabwe); twin brothers
- Peter Fatialofa (Samoa) and DJ Forbes (New Zealand); Peter was DJ's uncle.
- The Faletau-Vunipola family: Kuli Faletau (Tonga), Taulupe Faletau (Wales), Elisi Vunipola, Feʻao Vunipola, Manu Vunipola (Tonga), Billy Vunipola and Mako Vunipola (England); Kuli is Taulupe's father, and Feʻao's brother-in-law. Feʻao is Billy and Mako's father, and Elisi and Manu's brother. Mako and Billy are Elisi's and Manu's nephews.
- Guy Easterby, Simon Easterby (both Ireland), and Elgan Rees (Wales); Guy and Simon are brothers. Simon is Elgan's son-in-law
- Emonyi brothers (Kenya). Humphrey Kayange, Collins Injera and Michael Agevi. All three have represented Kenya in HSBC World Rugby Seven Series, Commonwealth Games, Africa Gold Cup.
- Doug Howlett (New Zealand) and Nili Latu (Tonga); cousins. Doug is the brother of New Zealand rugby league representative Phil Howlett
- Eddie Ioane (Samoa), Akira Ioane and Rieko Ioane (New Zealand); Eddie is Akira's father and Rieko is Akira's brother.
- John Kirwan (New Zealand) is John Ah Kuoi's (Samoa) brother-in-law.
- Jack Lam, Pat Lam (both Samoa), and Dylan Mika (New Zealand); cousins
- Lawrence Little, Nicky Little (both Fiji), and Walter Little (New Zealand); Nicky is the nephew of brothers Lawrence and Walter
- Donald MacDonald (Scotland) and Dugald MacDonald (South Africa); brothers
- Daniel Manu (Australia) and Nasi Manu (tonga); Daniel is Nasi's uncle, Nasi is also cousin of Sika Manu, who represented New Zealand and Tonga at rugby league
- James O'Donnell (New Zealand) and John O'Donnell (Australia); John was James's son
- James So'oialo (Samoa), Rodney So'oialo (New Zealand), and Steven So'oialo (Samoa); brothers
- The Stanley family: Joe Stanley (New Zealand) is the father of Jeremy Stanley (New Zealand). Chase Stanley and Kyle Stanley, also sons of Joe, have represented New Zealand and Samoa respectively at rugby league. Joe is the uncle of brothers Benson Stanley (New Zealand) and Winston Stanley (Samoa) and their cousin Michael Stanley (Samoa). Joe Stanley is distantly related to Quade Cooper and Sean Maitland (see above) through Maitland's maternal line, and is a cousin of Australian football international Tim Cahill.
- The Schuster family: Su'a Peter Schuster is the brother John Schuster and David(Samoa) and the father of Peter Schuster (Australia).
- Adriaan Strauss, Andries Strauss (both South Africa), and Richardt Strauss (Ireland); Andries and Richardt are brothers, Adriaan is their cousin
- David Sio (Samoa) and Scott Sio (Australia); David is Scott's father
- Alesana Tuilagi, Anitelea Tuilagi, Freddie Tuilagi, Henry Tuilagi, Sanele Vavae Tuilagi (all Samoa), and Manu Tuilagi (England); brothers. Posolo Tuilagi (France) is Henry's son
- To'o Vaega (Samoa) and Cardiff Vaega (New Zealand); To'o is Cardiff's father
- Akker van der Merwe (South Africa) and Duhan van der Merwe (Scotland); brothers
- Billy Vunipola, Mako Vunipola (both England), Manu Vunipola, Elisi Vunipola and Fe'ao Vunipola (all Tonga); Elisi, and Fe'ao are brothers. Fe'ao is Billy and Mako's Father
- Bryan Williams (New Zealand), Gavin Williams, and Paul Williams (both Samoa); Gavin and Paul are Bryan's sons
- Rean Van der Merwe (Zimbabwe) and Devon Van der Merwe (Cypress); Rean is Devon's father

== See also ==
- List of professional sports families
- List of family relations in American football
  - List of second-generation National Football League players
- List of association football (soccer) families
  - List of African association football families
  - List of European association football families
    - List of English association football families
    - List of former Yugoslavia association football families
    - List of Scottish football families
    - List of Spanish association football families
  - Category:Association football families
- List of Australian rules football families
- List of second-generation Major League Baseball players
- List of second-generation National Basketball Association players
- List of boxing families
- List of chess families
- List of International cricket families
- List of family relations in the National Hockey League
- List of family relations in rugby league
- List of professional wrestling families
