= Saxon McEwan =

Scotland international rugby union player & referee

- Born: Matthew Clark McEwan; 5 October 1865 Ayr, Scotland
- Died: 14 April 1899 (aged 33) Chicago, United States

Rugby union career
- Position: Forward
Amateur team(s)
Years	Team	Apps	(Points)
- Edinburgh Academicals
Provincial / State sides
Years	Team	Apps	(Points)
1885–89	East of Scotland District		
1886–88	Edinburgh District		
International career
Years	Team	Apps	(Points)
1886–92	Scotland	15	(7)
Refereeing career
Years	Competition		Apps
1892	Home Nations Championship		1

Matthew Clark McEwan (5 October 1865 – 14 April 1899), known as Saxon McEwan, was a Scotland international rugby union player.

== Rugby Union career ==
=== Amateur career ===
McEwan played for Edinburgh Academicals. He earned the nickname 'Saxon'.

=== Provincial career ===
McEwan played for East of Scotland District against West of Scotland District on 31 January 1885. He again played for East of Scotland District in the 1886 fixture, the 1887 fixture, and the 1888 fixture. He captained the East side in the 1889 match.

McEwan played for Edinburgh District in the 1886 inter-city fixture against Glasgow District, the 1887 fixture and the 1888 fixture.

=== International career ===
McEwan was capped fifteen times for Scotland between 1886 and 1892.

=== Refereeing career ===
McEwan refereed one international match in the Home Nations Championship; the 1892 match between England and Wales. Remarkably he was a still a Scotland international player at this point, and he later played for Scotland in that season's championship.

== Family ==
He was born to Thomas McEwan (1834-1895) and Agnes Clark (1840-1914). He was the brother of Bill McEwan who was also capped for Scotland.
