= Alfred Duke =

Scotland international rugby union player

- Born: Alfred Duke; 2 December 1866 Brechin, Scotland
- Died: 11 December 1945 (aged 79) Felton, England

Rugby union career
- Position: Forward
Amateur team(s)
Years	Team	Apps	(Points)
-	Royal HSFP		
Provincial / State sides
Years	Team	Apps	(Points)
1885-86	Edinburgh District		
1888	East of Scotland District		
International career
Years	Team	Apps	(Points)
1888-90	Scotland	6	(2)

Alfred Duke (2 December 1866 – 11 December 1945) was a Scotland international rugby union player.

== Rugby Union career ==
=== Amateur career ===
Duke played rugby union for Royal HSFP.

=== Provincial career ===
He played for Edinburgh District in their inter-city match against Glasgow District on 5 December 1885 and in the corresponding fixture of 1886.

He played for East of Scotland District in their match against West of Scotland District on 11 February 1888.

=== International career ===
Duke was capped 6 times by Scotland, from 1888 to 1890. He scored a try against Wales in the match of 1 February 1890.
