= Flowerdew Macindoe =

Scotland international rugby union player

- Born: Flowerdew James Macindoe; 14 February 1865 Hamilton, South Lanarkshire, Scotland
- Died: 11 October 1932 (aged 67) Poole, England

Rugby union career
- Position: Full Back
Amateur team(s)
Years	Team	Apps	(Points)
- Glasgow Academicals
Provincial / State sides
Years	Team	Apps	(Points)
1884-86	Glasgow District		
1885-86	West of Scotland District		
International career
Years	Team	Apps	(Points)
1886	Scotland	2	(0)

Flowerdew Macindoe (14 February 1865 – 11 October 1932) is a former Scotland international rugby union player.

== Rugby Union career ==
=== Amateur career ===
Macindoe played for Glasgow Academicals.

=== Provincial career ===
In 1884 and 1885, he was capped by Glasgow District for their inter-city match against Edinburgh District. He also played for Glasgow District against the North of Scotland District on 2 January 1886.

In 1885 and 1886 he played for West of Scotland District against East of Scotland District.

=== International career ===
He was capped twice for Scotland in 1886.

== Family ==
His father was George Park Macindoe (1822-1897) and his mother was Margaret Gray Flowerdew.
