= Louis Stevenson =

Scotland international rugby union player

- Born: Louis Edgar Stevenson; 31 January 1864 Jedburgh, Scotland
- Died: 19 August 1931 (aged 67) Temple Sowerby, England

Rugby union career
- Position: Forward
Amateur team(s)
| Years | Team | Apps | (Points) |
- Edinburgh University
| – | Cambridge University | | |
Provincial / State sides
| Years | Team | Apps | (Points) |
| 1887 | Edinburgh District | | |
| 1888 | East of Scotland District | | |
International career
| Years | Team | Apps | (Points) |
| 1888 | Scotland | 1 | (0) |

Louis Stevenson (31 January 1864 – 19 August 1931) is a former Scotland international rugby union player.

== Rugby Union career ==
=== Amateur career ===
Stevenson was schooled at St Peter's School in York, and the Nest Academy in Jedburgh where he studied under Dr. Fyfe, before attending Edinburgh University where he studied medicine.

The Nest Academy or the Wrens Nest was a boarding school which, according to legend, sent its pupils to bathe in the River Jed every morning before lessons.

He played rugby union for Edinburgh University.

From Edinburgh University, he moved to Christ's College, Cambridge, where he also played for the Cambridge University rugby union side.

=== Provincial career ===
He played for Edinburgh District against Glasgow District in the inter-city match of 1887.

He played for East of Scotland District in their match against West of Scotland District in February 1888.

=== International career ===
He was capped just the once for Scotland, in 1888.

== Other sports ==
He played cricket at St Peter's School and captained their team. He wrote to the editor of the Yorkshire Gazette in 1883 when they misreported the score of the side.

== Medical career ==
Stevenson became a doctor. He was first the house surgeon of the Cumberland Infirmary in Carlisle. He became the Assistant doctor to a Dr. Watson's G.P. practice in Temple Sowerby; and on the elder doctor's death he inherited the practice.

== Family ==
He was a distant relative of Robert Louis Stevenson.

He was born to James Charles Stevenson and Sarah Hirst Binns. James Charles Stevenson was a barrister at law.

Louis Stevenson married Elizabeth Margaret Falder (1859-1902) in 1892 at St. John's Wood in England. They had 2 daughters Gladys Roddam Stevenson and Mary Roddam Stevenson; and 1 son Arthur James Roddam Stevenson.

On Elizabeth's death, Stevenson married Eleanor Walker Jeffares (1868-1964).

== Death ==
Stevenson was found dead sitting in his chair in 1931.

A popular local doctor, when he died his funeral service was delivered by the Bishop of Carlisle, Dr. Williams, at the local Temple Sowerby church, which was reported to be filled to the rafters. The bishop went to the same school as Stevenson. During his dedication he remarked that Stevenson was very popular at school because he was such an athlete.

His estate was valued at £5793, 4 shillings and 8 pence.
