= Andrew Philp =

Scotland international rugby union player

- Born: Andrew Philp; 5 June 1859 Edinburgh, Scotland
- Died: 20 March 1937 (aged 77) Aberdeen, Scotland

Rugby union career
- Position: Centre
Amateur team(s)
Years	Team	Apps	(Points)
- Edinburgh Institution F.P.
Provincial / State sides
Years	Team	Apps	(Points)
1881	Edinburgh District		
1882	East of Scotland District		
International career
Years	Team	Apps	(Points)
1882	Scotland	1	(0)

Andrew Philp was a Scotland international rugby union player.

== Rugby Union career ==
=== Amateur career ===
He played for Edinburgh Institution F.P.

=== Provincial career ===
He played for Edinburgh District in the 1881 inter-city match.

He played for East of Scotland District in the 18 January 1882 match against West of Scotland District.

=== International career ===
He was capped once for Scotland, in 1882.

== Family ==
He was born to Andrew Philp and Eliza Miller. He had 3 brothers - James, William, and David - and 3 sisters - Margaret, Helen and Eliza Ann. Andrew was the second youngest.
