= 1941–42 Scottish Districts season =

Rugby union competition

- Countries: Scotland
- Date: 1941-42
- Matches played: 1

The 1941–42 Scottish Districts season is a record of all the rugby union matches for Scotland's district teams.

== History ==
There was no Inter-City match this year due to the Second World War.

East of Scotland District played a West of Scotland District side.

== Results ==
Date	Try	Conversion	Penalty	Dropped goal	Goal from mark	Notes
1905–1947	3 points	2 points	3 points	4 points	3 points	

=== Inter-City ===
None.

=== Other Scottish matches ===
6 December 1941

East of Scotland District	22 - 5	West of Scotland District
	Report

Old Anniesland, Glasgow
Attendance: 1,200
Referee: J. W. Allan (Melrose)

East of Scotland District:
West of Scotland District:

=== English matches ===
No other District matches played.

=== International matches ===
No touring matches this season.
