= 1942–43 Scottish Districts season =

Rugby union competition

- Countries: Scotland
- Date: 1942-43
- Matches played: 1

The 1942–43 Scottish Districts season is a record of all the rugby union matches for Scotland's district teams.

== History ==
There was no Inter-City match this year due to the Second World War.

East of Scotland District played a West of Scotland District side.

== Results ==
Date	Try	Conversion	Penalty	Dropped goal	Goal from mark	Notes
1905–1947	3 points	2 points	3 points	4 points	3 points	

=== Inter-City ===
None.

=== Other Scottish matches ===
5 December 1942

East of Scotland District	21 - 8	West of Scotland District
	Report

Myreside, Edinburgh
Attendance: 3,000

East of Scotland District:
West of Scotland District:

=== English matches ===
No other District matches played.

=== International matches ===
No touring matches this season.
