= Nat Brewis =

Scotland international rugby union player

- Born: Nathaniel Thomas Brewis; 16 April 1856 Escott Hall, Morpeth, England
- Died: 21 October 1924 (aged 68) Edinburgh, Scotland

Rugby union career
- Position: Forward
Amateur team(s)
Years	Team	Apps	(Points)
-	Edinburgh Institution F.P.		
Provincial / State sides
Years	Team	Apps	(Points)
1875-	Edinburgh District		
1878	Blues Trial		
International career
Years	Team	Apps	(Points)
1876-80	Scotland	6	(0)
Refereeing career
Years	Competition		Apps
1881	Scottish Districts		

13th President of the Scottish Rugby Union
- In office 1885–1886
- Preceded by: Malcolm Cross
- Succeeded by: James Stewart Carrick

Dr Nathaniel Thomas Brewis FRCPE FRCSE (16 April 1856 – 21 October 1924) was a Scottish doctor and international rugby union player. He became the 13th President of the Scottish Rugby Union.

== Medical career ==
Nathaniel Brewis graduated from the University of Edinburgh with an MB in 1882, and began his career as a House-Surgeon at the Edinburgh Royal Infirmary and Glasgow Maternity Hospital. He proceeded to specialise in Gynaecology, serving as obstetrician and gynaecologist to the Edinburgh New Town Dispensary, Leith Hospital, and Edinburgh Royal Infirmary. A Fellow of both the Royal College of Physicians of Edinburgh and the Royal College of Surgeons of Edinburgh, Brewis was also elected president of the Edinburgh Obstetrical Society. He retired from his medical career in 1922.

== Rugby union career ==
=== Amateur career ===
He played for Edinburgh Institution F.P.

=== Provincial career ===
Cross was capped by Edinburgh District to play against Glasgow District in the inter-city match in 1875.

He was selected and played in the Blues Trial side of 1878.

=== International career ===
He was capped six times for Scotland between 1876–80.

=== Referee career ===
He refereed the East v West district match in early 1881.

=== Administrative career ===
He was Honorary Secretary of the Scottish Rugby Union in 1880–81. He attempted to bring in a North of Scotland District versus South of Scotland District match that season, but the fixture did not take place.

He was made the 13th President of the Scottish Rugby Union in 1885-86.
