= William Sorley Brown =

Scotland international rugby union player

- Born: William Sorley Brown; 2 June 1860 Glasgow, Scotland
- Died: 15 September 1901 (aged 41) Galashiels, Scotland

Rugby union career
- Position: Half back
Amateur team(s)
Years	Team	Apps	(Points)
-	Edinburgh Institution F.P.		
Provincial / State sides
Years	Team	Apps	(Points)
1880	East of Scotland District		
1881	Edinburgh District		
International career
Years	Team	Apps	(Points)
1880-83	Scotland	6	(6)

15th President of the Scottish Rugby Union
- In office 1887–1888
- Preceded by: James Stewart Carrick
- Succeeded by: Robert Bruce Young

William Sorley Brown (1860–1901) was a Scottish international rugby union player. He became the 15th President of the Scottish Rugby Union.

== Rugby union career ==
=== Amateur career ===
He played for Edinburgh Institution F.P.

=== Provincial career ===
Brown was capped by East of Scotland District to play against West of Scotland District at the end of January 1880.

Brown was capped by Edinburgh District to play against Glasgow District in the inter-city match in 1881.

=== International career ===
He was capped six times for Scotland between 1880 and 1883.

=== Administrative career ===
He was made the 15th president of the Scottish Rugby Union for the period 1887-88.
