= Gordon Mitchell (rugby union) =

Scotland international rugby union player

- Born: James Gordon Mitchell; 26 May 1865 Hamilton, Scotland
- Died: 30 July 1896 (aged 31) Inhambane, Mozambique
- School: Craigmount School

Rugby union career
- Position: Forward
Amateur team(s)
Years	Team	Apps	(Points)
- West of Scotland
Provincial / State sides
Years	Team	Apps	(Points)
1883-85	Glasgow District		
1885-87	West of Scotland District		
International career
Years	Team	Apps	(Points)
1885	Scotland	3	(0)

18th President of the Scottish Rugby Union
- In office 1890–1891
- Preceded by: Andrew Ramsay Don-Wauchope
- Succeeded by: Thomas Ainslie

Gordon Mitchell (26 May 1865 – 30 July 1896) was a Scotland international rugby union player.

== Rugby union career ==
=== Amateur career ===
Mitchell played for West of Scotland. He went on to captain the club. His time there was noted by the Dundee Evening Telegraph as 'one of the most brilliant in the history of the club'.

=== Provincial career ===
Mitchell played for Glasgow District in the inter-city matches of 1883 and 1884 and 1885.

He was also capped for West of Scotland District in their match against East of Scotland District in January 1885 and 1886.

He captained the West side in January 1887.

=== International career ===
He was capped three times for Scotland in 1885.

The Dundee Evening Telegraph noted that 'Mitchell was a typical Scottish forward in as much as his play was a combination of physical prowess and brain power'.

=== Administrative career ===
Mitchell became the 18th President of the Scottish Rugby Union. He served the 1890–91 term in office.

== Death ==
Mitchell died on his way back from to Scotland from Inhambane, Mozambique. His obituary notes that he was an all-round sportsman with a talent, not only for rugby union, but for both cricket and running. However it goes on to say that he was not interested in either: he did not practise cricket and rarely 'donned his spikes' to run.
