= James Holt Marsh =

England & Scotland international rugby union player

- Born: James Holt Marsh; 31 October 1865 Rumworth, England
- Died: 1 August 1928 (aged 62) Leigh, England
- School: Edinburgh Institute
- University: Edinburgh University

Rugby union career
- Position: Three-quarter
Amateur team(s)
Years	Team	Apps	(Points)
1886–90	Edinburgh Institution F.P.		
1890	Edinburgh University		
1890–	Swinton		
Provincial / State sides
Years	Team	Apps	(Points)
1886–88	Edinburgh District		
1887–89	East of Scotland District		
1890	Lancashire		
International career
Years	Team	Apps	(Points)
1889	Scotland	2	(0)
1892	England	1	(0)

James Holt Marsh (31 October 1865 – 1 August 1928), was first a Scotland international rugby union player; and then an England international rugby union player. He played club rugby for Edinburgh Institution F.P., Edinburgh University and Swinton; and provincial rugby for Edinburgh District and East of Scotland District. He is the only player to have represented two international teams in the Home Nations Championship. He was a General Practitioner by profession, holding a practice in Manchester for nearly forty years.

== Rugby Union career ==
=== Amateur career ===
Born in Rumworth, near Swinton in England, Marsh was schooled in Scotland. Marsh was educated at Edinburgh Institute before being accepted at Edinburgh University to study medicine.

At the time of his Scotland call-up, Marsh was playing club rugby for Edinburgh Institution F.P., and was brought in at three-quarters.

He moved to play for Edinburgh University in 1890. This did not go down well with his former club and the Athletic News of 27 October 1890 reported:

Some rather bitter things are being said in Edinburgh about James Marsh, the Swintonian, preferring to play for Edinburgh University instead of with his old colleagues in the Edinburgh Institution Club.

This prompted a move to England that same season; and he then played for Swinton.

=== Provincial career ===
He played for Edinburgh District against Glasgow District in the 1886 inter-city match. He also played for Edinburgh in the 1887 and 1888 fixtures.

He played for East of Scotland District in their match against West of Scotland District on 29 January 1887. He also played in the 1888 and 1889 fixtures.

Almost immediately on his move to Swinton, he was playing in the Lancashire versus Yorkshire match on 29 November 1890. He was noted as an Edinburgh University three-quarter and also as playing for Swinton. Lancashire won the match.

After his move to England, it was during the 1890–91 season his strong club play brought him to the attention of the English selectors, and he was brought into England's annual North vs. South match.

=== International career ===
In 1889, Marsh was selected for the Scottish international team when he was chosen to face Wales as part of the 1890 Home Nations Championship. Scotland beat Wales, and Marsh was reselected for the second and final game of the competition, away to Ireland at Belfast. With England having withdrawn from the tournament, a win over the Irish would give Scotland the Home Nations, but not the Grand Slam. Scotland won the match thanks to a single dropped goal from Henry Stevenson.

His move to England and his form for Swinton led to Marsh being selected for the 1892 Home Nations Championship for England in the game against Ireland, playing again at three-quarters alongside Dicky Lockwood and George Hubbard. The English team was victorious, but Marsh was not selected for the team again. It is unknown if this was due to sanctions or actions taken by the rugby unions or if it was a selection choice.

== Medical career ==
After qualifying as a doctor, Marsh moved to Manchester to set up a medical practice.

== Bibliography ==
- Griffiths, John (2000). Rugby's Strangest Matches. Robson Books. ISBN 1-86105-354-1.
- Griffiths, Terry (1987). The Phoenix Book of International Rugby Records. London: Phoenix House. ISBN 0-460-07003-7.
