= Edinburgh Institution =

Edinburgh Institution may refer to:

- Edinburgh Institution F.P., a former Edinburgh rugby union club
- Stewart's Melville College, formerly Edinburgh Institution for Languages and Mathematics
- Royal Scottish Academy, formerly Royal Institution for the Encouragement of the Fine Arts
