= Robert Bruce Young =

Scottish rugby union player

- Born: Robert Bruce Young; 2 August 1858 Anderston, Glasgow, Scotland
- Died: 16 March 1927 (aged 68) Glasgow, Scotland

Rugby union career
- Position: Forward
Amateur team(s)
Years	Team	Apps	(Points)
-	Glasgow University		
Provincial / State sides
Years	Team	Apps	(Points)
1881-	Glasgow District		
Refereeing career
Years	Competition		Apps
1887-	Scottish Unofficial Championship		
1889-	Scottish Districts		

16th President of the Scottish Rugby Union
- In office 1888–1889
- Preceded by: William Sorley Brown
- Succeeded by: Andrew Ramsay Don-Wauchope

Dr. Robert Bruce Young (2 August 1858 – 16 March 1927) was a Scottish rugby union player who played for Glasgow University and Glasgow District. He became the 16th President of the Scottish Rugby Union and a referee.

== Rugby Union career ==
=== Amateur career ===
Young played for Glasgow University.

=== Provincial career ===
He was capped by Glasgow District in 1881. It was the first match won by Glasgow in the Inter-City series.

=== Referee career ===
He refereed in the Scottish Unofficial Championship. He also refereed Scottish District matches.

=== Administrative career ===
He was President of the Royal HSFP.

He was the Vice-President of the Scottish Rugby Union in 1887.

He was made the 16th President of the Scottish Rugby Union in 1888-89. The Glasgow Herald reported his succession:

A gentleman who has long taken an interest in the rugby game, and who, from experience and general ability, is well qualified for the position.

During his tenure as President, the Scottish Rugby Union had a conflict with the English Rugby Union. The Scottish Rugby Union together with the Welsh Rugby Union and the Irish Rugby Football Union founded the International Rugby Board, now World Rugby to oversee the game. The English Union refused to join.

Young was reported in The Sporting Life thus:

The attitude of the latter country [England] was, he considered, most unsportsmanlike. She had taken a stand against the other three countries against which she could not bring the charge of being actuated by any desire to get the better of England or destroy football. The other nations had the welfare of football at heart. He believed that the International Board would win, and that England would be defeated in this battle. The Scottish members of their board always had the greatest satisfaction in feeling that they had the unanimous support of the clubs in their union.

The Glasgow Herald opined that on the dispute Dr Bruce Young had performed admirably, such that his:

wise counsel last year in dealing with the international dispute with England, greatly strengthened the position of Scotland in that matter.

== Outside of rugby ==
Young was a doctor of medicine.
