= James Stewart Carrick =

Scotland international rugby union player, referee & cricketer

J.S. Carrick
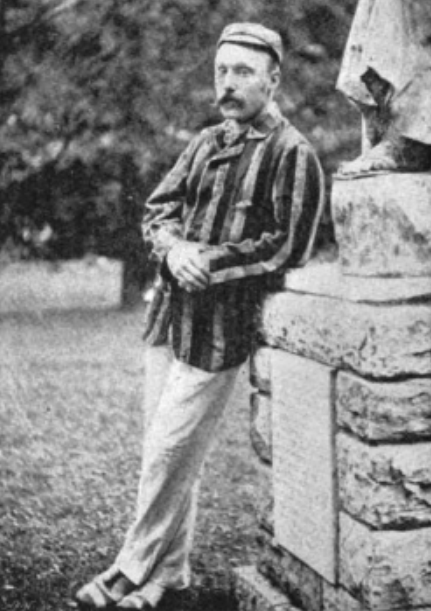
- In The Sketch, 8 May 1895
- Born: James Stewart Carrick; 4 September 1855 Glasgow, Scotland
- Died: 2 January 1923 (aged 67) Seattle, United States

Rugby union career
- Position: Fullback
Amateur team(s)
Years	Team	Apps	(Points)
-	Glasgow Academicals		
Provincial / State sides
Years	Team	Apps	(Points)
-	Glasgow District		
-	West of Scotland District		
-	Whites Trial		
International career
Years	Team	Apps	(Points)
1876-7	Scotland	2	(0)
Refereeing career
Years	Competition		Apps
1886-	Scottish Districts		

14th President of the Scottish Rugby Union
- In office 1886–1887
- Preceded by: Nat Brewis
- Succeeded by: William Sorley Brown

James Stewart Carrick (4 September 1855 – 2 January 1923) was a Scottish rugby union and cricket player. He died in Seattle, Washington in 1923.

Carrick was regarded as an all-round sportsman, playing international rugby as a full-back for Scotland, and appeared in a few important cricket matches. He was the only batsman to take a century off Nottinghamshire CCC between 1887 and 1890 when they dominated county cricket.

== Rugby union career ==
=== Amateur career ===
Carrick played with Glasgow Academicals.

=== Provincial career ===
He also played at provincial level representing Glasgow District.

He also represented the West of Scotland District.

He was selected for the Whites Trial side in 1878.

=== International career ===
Carrick was capped for the Scotland international squad between 1876 and 1877.

=== Referee career ===
Carrick later became a rugby union referee. He refereed the East of Scotland District versus West of Scotland District match in 1886.

He refereed the Glasgow District versus Edinburgh District match in 1887.

=== Administrative career ===
Carrick became the 15th President of the Scottish Rugby Union. He served the 1886–87 term in office.

== Cricket career ==
A notable cricketer who took the record for the world's highest score at the age of 29, Carrick scored 419 not out for the touring West of Scotland team against Priory Park in Chichester in July 1885. A left-handed batsman, he batted for 11 and a half hours and the second day's play was extended by a few minutes to allow him to beat William Roe's 415.

Carrick opened the innings and batted for the entire two-day match, making his score out of 745/4. He scored one eight (a huge hit to square leg), two sixes, two fives and 30 fours. The Priory Park bowling was headed by James Lillywhite, a bowler with over 1,200 first-class wickets, including eight in his two Tests, but who was caned for 170 here. Carrick's innings featured strong off-driving and hefty blows to leg and was blemished by only two chances, to deep-mid-on and the keeper. Priory Park put the chance to become part of history above any resentment over the lack of a declaration and, the record achieved, Carrick was "carried to the dressing room amid immense cheering".

His brother, John Carrick, played cricket at first-class level.

== See also ==
- List of Scottish cricket and rugby union players
