= 1884–85 Scottish Districts season =

Rugby union competition

- Countries: Scotland
- Date: 1884–85
- Matches played: 1

The 1884–85 Scottish Districts season is a record of all the rugby union matches for Scotland's district teams.

It includes the East of Scotland District versus West of Scotland District trial match.

== History ==
Glasgow District won back the Inter-City from Edinburgh District.

== Results ==
Date	Try	Conversion	Penalty	Dropped goal	Goal from mark	Notes
1876–1885	1 try	1 goal	1 goal	1 goal	—	
1876–1885	Match decided by a majority of goals, or if the number of goals is equal by a majority of tries					

=== Inter-City ===
6 December 1884
3pm (2.30pm advertised)

Glasgow District	1 goal - 1 try	Edinburgh District
Try: Stephen; Con: Reid	Preview; Report	Try: Cosens

Hamilton Crescent, Glasgow
Attendance: 2,000
Referee: Gussie Graham (SRU)

Glasgow District: F. Macindoe (Glasgow Academicals), R. G. Eaglesham (West of Scotland), M. F. Reid (West of Scotland), A. E. Stephen (West of Scotland), H. Kennedy (Glasgow Academionls), J. M. Ross (West of Scotland), J. B. Brown (Glasgow Academicals), G. H. Robb (Glasgow Academicals), J. French (Glasgow Academicals), A. Young (Glasgow Academicals), J. Jamieson (West of Scotland) [captain], D. Morton (West of Scotland), J. G. Mitchell (West of Scotland), A. Findlay (West of Scotland), and W. A. McDonald (1st Lanarkshire Rifle Volunteers).
Edinburgh District: Cameron (Watsonians), A. Ronald (Edinburgh Wanderers), Evans (Edinburgh University), G. Maitland (Edinburgh Institution), A. R. Don Wauchope (Edinburgh Wanderers), P. Cosens (Royal HSFP), William Peterkin (Edinburgh University). Reid (Edinburgh Academicals), T. Ainslie (Edinburgh Institution). Robert Maitland (Edinourgh Institution). J. Tod (Watsoniana), J. Brown (St. George), G. Henderson (Edinburgh Institution), J. Greig (Edinburgh Wanderers), Irvine (Edinburgh Academicals)

=== Other Scottish matches ===
31 January 1885

East of Scotland District	1 goal, 2 tries - 0	West of Scotland District
Try: William Peterkin; G. Maitland; Evans; Con: Robert Maitland	Report

Raeburn Place, Edinburgh

East: J. P. Veitch (Royal HSFP), G. Maitland (Edinburgh Institution) L. Evans (Edinburgh University), McKenzie (Institution), A. R Don Wauchope (Fettesian-Lorrettonians) P. H. Cosens (Royal HSFP), C. Reid (Edinburgh Academicals), T. Ainslie (Edinburgh Institution), Dr. Tod (Watsonians), William Peterkin (Edinburgh University), Robert Maitland (Edinburgh Institution), R. Ainslie (Edinburgh Institution), W. Irvine (Edinburgh Academicals), Horsburgh (Royal HSFP), McEwen (Edinburgh Academicals)
Reserves: W. Cameron (Watsonians), Aitken (Edinburgh Wanderers), Rutherford (Royal HSFP), W. J. Laing (Watsonians), Cosens (Royal HSFP), P. H. Don Wauchope (Edinburgh Wanderers), Greig (Edinburgh Wanderers), Douglas (Collegiate), Henderson (Edinburgh Institution)
West: Macindoe (Glasgow Academicals), Holms (Blair Lodge), Stephen (West of Scotland), Eaglesham (West of Scotland), Kennedy (Glasgow Academicals), Graham (Glasgow Academicals), Jamieson (West of Scotland), Morton (West of Scotland), Mitchell (West of Scotland), Robb (Glasgow Academicals), Young (Glasgow Academicals), French (Glasgow Academicals), Macdonald (Glasgow University)
Reserves: Finlay, W. Macdonald, Ker, Macdonald (lst Lanarkshire Volunteers), Holm, Bruce, Orr, W. McKendrick

=== English matches ===
No other District matches played.

=== International matches ===
No touring matches this season.
