= Archibald Walker =

Scotland international rugby union player

- Born: Archibald Walker; 29 June 1858 Glasgow, Scotland
- Died: 10 June 1945 (aged 86) Newark Castle, Ayr, Scotland
- Notable relative(s): James Walker, brother

Rugby union career
- Position: Forward
Amateur team(s)
Years	Team	Apps	(Points)
- West of Scotland
–	Fettesian-Lorettonians		
–	Oxford University		
Provincial / State sides
Years	Team	Apps	(Points)
1881	Glasgow District		
1882	West of Scotland District		
International career
Years	Team	Apps	(Points)
1881-83	Scotland	5	(0)

Archibald Walker was a Scotland international rugby union player.

== Rugby Union career ==
=== Amateur career ===
He played for West of Scotland.

He played for Fettesian-Lorettonians in 1883 while still with West of Scotland, alongside his brother James Walker who was named as an Oxford University player.

He also played rugby for Oxford University.

=== Provincial career ===
He played for Glasgow District against Edinburgh District in the inter-city match of 3 December 1881.

He played for West of Scotland District in their match against East of Scotland District on 28 January 1882.

=== International career ===
He was capped five times for Scotland between 1881 and 1883.

== Other sports ==
He rowed in the college eight at Oxford University.

== Business career ==
He was a director of the Distillers Company Ltd. for 32 years.

He was Deputy Chairman of the Clydesdale Bank between 1923 and 1940.

He was a member of the Royal Company of Archers; and a member of the King's Bodyguard for Scotland.

== Family ==
He was born to Archibald Walker (1815–80) and Mary MacFarlane Smith (1826-1913). He had siblings:- James Walker (1859-1923), who was also capped for Scotland; Mary Smith Walker; and Agnes Walker.

He married Adelaide Orr Thomson (1875-1924). They had a son George Edward Orr Walker and daughter Adelaide Mary Orr Walker. George became a Lieutenant Colonel in the army, but continued to use the Major rank as he was better known with that rank, and ran for the Westminster Parliament in 1945 for the Conservative Party in the Kilmarnock constituency. However it was won by Clarice Shaw, a music teacher and member of Troon town council, for the Labour Party.
