= David Somerville (rugby union) =

Scotland international rugby union & cricket player

- Born: David Somerville; 6 August 1856 Leith, Scotland
- Died: 4 February 1933 (aged 76) Edinburgh, Scotland

Rugby union career
- Position: Forward
Amateur team(s)
Years	Team	Apps	(Points)
- Edinburgh Institution F.P.
Provincial / State sides
Years	Team	Apps	(Points)
1877	Edinburgh District		
1878	Whites Trial		
1879	East of Scotland District		
International career
Years	Team	Apps	(Points)
1879-84	Scotland	6	((2 tries))

David Somerville (6 August 1856 – 4 February 1933) was a Scotland international rugby union player He also played for the Scotland national cricket team.

== Rugby Union career ==
=== Amateur career ===
His club was Edinburgh Institution F.P.

=== Provincial career ===
He played for Edinburgh District in their inter-city match against Glasgow District on 1 December 1877.

He played for Whites Trial in their match against Blues Trial on 16 February 1878. This trial match was to try and impress the Scotland international side selectors.

He played for East of Scotland District in their match against West of Scotland District on 1 March 1879.

=== International career ===
He was capped six times for Scotland between 1879 and 1884 including the 1883 Home Nations Championship.

== Cricket career ==
He played for the Scotland national cricket team.
