= William Masters (rugby union) =

Scottish international rugby union player

- Born: William Hay Masters; 25 June 1858 Edinburgh, Scotland
- Died: 2 October 1897 (aged 39) Buenos Aires, Argentina

Rugby union career
- Position: Half back
Amateur team(s)
Years	Team	Apps	(Points)
- Edinburgh Institution F.P.
Provincial / State sides
Years	Team	Apps	(Points)
1877	Edinburgh District		
1878	East of Scotland District		
1878	Whites Trial		
International career
Years	Team	Apps	(Points)
1879-80	Scotland	3	

William Masters (25 June 1858 – 2 October 1897) was a Scotland international rugby union player.

== Rugby Union career ==
=== Amateur career ===
Masters played rugby union for Edinburgh Institution F.P.

=== Provincial career ===
He played for Edinburgh District in their inter-city match against Glasgow District on 1 December 1877. He was moved to the Quarter back position as Ninian Finlay and Bill Maclagan played at Half back. Masters won the match for Edinburgh by scoring a drop goal.

He played for the East of Scotland District in their match against West of Scotland District on 9 February 1878. Again, Masters played at Quarter back.

He played for the Whites Trial side against the Blues Trial side on 16 February 1878.

=== International career ===
Masters was capped three times by Scotland from 1879 to 1880. He scored a try in the match against Ireland on 14 February 1880.

== Death ==
Masters had trips of South America working as a civil engineer to Buenos Aires and Valparaíso

He died in Argentina. He is noted as a railwayman. He was buried in Edinburgh at the Dean Cemetery 2c.
