= 1881–82 Scottish Districts season =

Rugby union competition

- Countries: Scotland
- Date: 1881-82
- Matches played: 2

The 1881–82 Scottish Districts season is a record of all the rugby union matches for Scotland's district teams.

It includes the East of Scotland District versus West of Scotland District trial match.

== History ==
This season saw the first time that Glasgow won the Inter-City match.

After last season's failed attempt to get a North v South fixture played, it was proposed that now 3 new district fixtures be played.

From the Aberdeen Press and Journal of 19 December 1881:

At the recent annual meeting of the union [SRU] Mr. R. Craigie Bell of Aberdeenshire, renewed this solicitations on their behalf and on behalf on their provincial friends generally, and in addition to the North versus South match, proposed the introduction of two other Union fixtures viz. the Northern versus Midland counties and a South-eastern versus South-western counties match. The union accordingly gave the proposal their best consideration, and chiefly through Mr. Petrie's personal inquiries, and perhaps in consequence of hailing from Banff himself, and thus having a 'weak side' towards the north, the northern counties match was agreed to...

The Midlands District side was formed to play a North of Scotland District side for the first time on 17 December 1881.

The North versus South fixture was played this season for the first time on 31 December 1881.

== Results ==
Date	Try	Conversion	Penalty	Dropped goal	Goal from mark	Notes
1876–1885	1 try	1 goal	1 goal	1 goal	—	
1876–1885	Match decided by a majority of goals, or if the number of goals is equal by a majority of tries					

=== Inter-City ===
3 December 1881

Glasgow District	1 goal, 1 try - 1 goal	Edinburgh District
Try: Robb; Con: Dunlop; Cassels	Report	Try: Brown

Hamilton Crescent, Glasgow
Attendance: 2,000

Glasgow District: David Kidston (Glasgow Academicals), A. J. W. Reid (West of Scotland), C. W. Dunlop (West of Scotland),
John Alexander Neilson (West of Scotland) and C. Ker (Glasgow Academicals),
D. Y. Cassels (West of Scotland) [captain], David McCowan (West of Scotland), Archibald Walker (West of Scotland), R. Adam (West of Scotland),
R. B. Young (Glasgow University), J. Lang (Glasgow University),
John Blair Brown (Glasgow Academicals), R. A. Kerr (Glasgow Academicals), William Andrew Walls (Glasgow Academicals), George Robb (Glasgow Academicals)
Edinburgh District: J. P. Veitch (Royal HSFP), John Clegg (Edinburgh University), G. Lindsay (Loretto), G. T. Chadwick (Edinburgh University), W. S. Brown (Edinburgh Institution F.P.), A. Philp (Edinburgh Institution F.P.), R. Ainslie (Edinburgh Institution F.P.), D. Somerville (Edinburgh Institution F.P.), Robert Maitland (Edinburgh Institution F.P.), G. Macleod (Edinburgh Wanderers), G. Morrison (Edinburgh Wanderers), R. S. F. Henderson (Edinburgh University), F. Bateson (Edinburgh University), T. Jeffrey (Edinburgh Academicals), J. Wilson (Royal HSFP)

=== Other Scottish matches ===
17 December 1881

North of Scotland District	1 goal - 1 goal	Midlands District
	Preview; Report

Holborn Ground, Aberdeen

North:
Midlands:

31 December 1881

North of Scotland District	1 goal, 1 try - 2 tries	South of Scotland District
	Report

Raeburn Place, Edinburgh

North:
South:

28 January 1882

East of Scotland District	3 tries - 1 goal	West of Scotland District
	Report; Report

Raeburn Place, Edinburgh

East: J. P. Veitch (Royal HSFP), J. Glegg (Edinburgh University), A. Philp (Edinburgh Institution F.P.), W. S. Brown (Edinburgh Institution F.P.), W. K. Morton (Edinburgh University), R. Ainslie (Edinburgh Institution F.P.) [captain], T. Ainslie (Edinburgh Institution F.P.), D. Somerville (Edinburgh Institution F.P.), R. S. F. Henderson (Edinburgh University), G. B. Guthrie (Edinburgh University), John Tod (Edinburgh University), G. McLeod (Edinburgh Wanderers), T. Jeffrey (Edinburgh Academicals), N. Watt (Royal HSFP), J. Wilson (Royal HSFP)
West: D. W. Kidston (Glasgow Academicals), R. Campbell (Glasgow Academicals), C. W. Dunlop (West of Scotland), C. Kerr (Glasgow University), J. Adamson (West of Scotland), D. Y. Cassells (West of Scotland) [captain], J. Adam (West of Scotland), A. Walker (West of Scotland), J. B. Brown (Glasgow Academicals), E. A. Kerr (Glasgow Academicals), G. H. Robb (Glasgow Academicals), W. A. Walls (Glasgow Academicals), B. Allan (Glasgow Academicals), J. S. Lang (Glasgow University), R. B. Young (Glasgow University)

=== English matches ===
No other District matches played.

=== International matches ===
No touring matches this season.
