= Gordon Davis (rugby union) =

Australian rugby union international

- Full name: Gordon Walter Grey Davis
- Born: 19 June 1925 Auburn, NSW, Australia
- Died: 22 July 1999 (aged 74)
- Notable relative(s): Clarrie Davis (brother); Tom Davis (uncle)

Rugby union career
- Position: Centre
International career
Years	Team	Apps	(Points)
1955	Australia	2	(0)

Gordon Walter Grey Davis (19 June 1925 – 22 July 1999) was an Australian rugby union international.

Born and raised in Sydney, Davis was the nephew of 1920s Test prop Tom Davis. His younger brother Clarrie was capped four times for the Wallabies as a winger. He attended Chatswood Junior High School.

Davis, a centre three quarter, played his immediate post war rugby with Manly and made his New South Wales representative debut in 1948. He moved to the town of Yeoval in 1952 and two years later toured New Zealand with NSW Country, scoring 10 tries from 10 matches. Further New South Wales representative appearances came in 1955 and he formed a good combination with Wallabies centre Jim Phipps. He was subsequently named in the squad for the 1955 tour of New Zealand, where he was capped in the 2nd and 3rd Tests, the latter in a rare win at Eden Park.

== See also ==
- List of Australia national rugby union players
