= Robert Ainslie (rugby union) =

Scotland international rugby union player

- Born: Robert Ainslie; 30 January 1858 Lasswade, Scotland
- Died: 12 May 1906 (aged 48) Sydney, Australia

Rugby union career
- Position: Forward
Amateur team(s)
Years	Team	Apps	(Points)
- Edinburgh Institution F.P.
Provincial / State sides
Years	Team	Apps	(Points)
1877	Edinburgh District		
1878	East of Scotland District		
1878	Whites Trial		
International career
Years	Team	Apps	(Points)
1879-82	Scotland	7	(3 tries)

Robert Ainslie was a Scotland international rugby union player. His playing position was Forward.

== Rugby Union career ==
=== Amateur career ===
Ainslie played for Edinburgh Institution F.P.

=== Provincial career ===
Ainslie played for Edinburgh District in their inter-city match against Glasgow District on 1 December 1887 and on 4 December 1880.

Ainslie was capped by East of Scotland District in their match against West of Scotland District on 9 February 1878 and on 5 February 1881.

Ainslie played for Whites Trial in their match against Blues Trial on 16 February 1878.

=== International career ===
Ainslie was capped seven times for Scotland between 1879 and 1882.

== Family ==
Ainslie was the brother of Thomas Ainslie who was also capped for Scotland.
