= John Carrick (cricketer) =

Scottish cricketer and stockbroker

Personal information
- Full name: John Carrick
- Born: 29 November 1853; Glasgow, Lanarkshire, Scotland
- Died: 3 November 1916 (aged 62); Eastbourne, Sussex, England
- Batting: Unknown

Domestic team information
- Years: Team
- 1882: Marylebone Cricket Club

Career statistics
Competition	First-class
Matches	1
Runs scored	13
Batting average	6.50
100s/50s	–/–
Top score	10
Catches/stumpings	–/–
- Source: Cricinfo, 6 October 2021

John Carrick (29 November 1853 — 3 November 1916) was a Scottish first-class cricketer and stockbroker.

The son of John Carrick, the city architect for Glasgow, he was born in November 1853 at Glasgow and was educated at The Glasgow Academy. He later made a single appearance in first-class cricket for the Marylebone Cricket Club (MCC) against Nottinghamshire at Lord's in 1882. Batting twice in the match, he was dismissed in the MCC first innings for 10 runs by William Attewell, while in their second innings he was dismissed for 3 runs by Alfred Shaw. In addition to playing first-class cricket, Carrick also played club cricket in Scotland for the West of Scotland Cricket Club from 1884 to 1887. He was by profession a stockbroker. Carrick died suddenly in England at Eastbourne in November 1916. His brother was James Stewart Carrick, a rugby international who was also noted as a cricketer.
