= Pat Smeaton =

Scotland international rugby union player

- Born: Patrick Walker Smeaton; 12 November 1857 Kincardine, Fife, Scotland
- Died: 11 August 1928 (aged 70) Edinburgh, Scotland

Rugby union career
- Position: Half back
Amateur team(s)
| Years | Team | Apps | (Points) |
- Edinburgh Academicals
Provincial / State sides
| Years | Team | Apps | (Points) |
| 1880 | Edinburgh District | | |
| 1881 | East of Scotland District | | |
International career
| Years | Team | Apps | (Points) |
| 1881-83 | Scotland | 3 | (0) |

Pat Smeaton (12 November 1857 - 11 August 1928) was a Scotland international rugby union player.

== Rugby Union career ==
=== Amateur career ===
Smeaton played for Edinburgh Academicals. He was club captain for the 1881-82 season.

Although favouring playing in the back line, Smeaton was noted for his versality. In noting a match between the Academicals and Royal HSFP it was observed:

P. W. Smeaton, who was a sort of handy man, sometimes in, sometimes out of the forward division, stole away from a throw-out and 'galloped' over the line for the Edinburgh Academical winning score in the 'School' match. Smeaton had a style of progression peculiarly his own. It was more a gallop than a run.

=== Provincial career ===
He played for Edinburgh District in their inter-city match against Glasgow District on 4 December 1880. He started the match playing at Three quarters.

Smeaton played for East of Scotland District in their match against West of Scotland District on 5 February 1881.

=== International career ===
Smeaton played for Scotland 3 times, from 1881 to 1883.
