= Clarrie Davis =

Australian rugby union player

- Full name: Clarence Clive Davis
- Born: 4 March 1928 Auburn, NSW, Australia
- Died: 25 August 2006 (aged 78)
- Notable relative(s): Gordon Davis (brother); Tom Davis (uncle)

Rugby union career
- Position: Centre / Wing
International career
Years	Team	Apps	(Points)
1949–51	Australia	4	(0)

Clarence Clive Davis (4 March 1928 – 25 August 2006) was an Australian rugby union international.

Davis, born in Auburn, Sydney, was the nephew of 1920s Test prop Tom Davis and younger brother of Wallabies centre Gordon Davis. He was educated at North Sydney Boys' High School.

A speedy three quarter, Davis played first-grade for Manly and earned his first Wallabies call up in 1949 to play the touring New Zealand Māori team. Due to a thigh injury, he had to withdraw a day before the 1st Test and missed the entire series, but got another opportunity three months later on the 1949 tour of New Zealand, gaining his first cap in a win over the All Blacks in Wellington. He was capped a further three times in the home series against the All Blacks in 1951. Although best suited to playing centre, he was utilised as a winger by the Wallabies. He retired from rugby in 1954 because of injury.

== See also ==
- List of Australia national rugby union players
