= Thomas Ainslie (rugby union) =

Scotland international rugby union player (1860–1926)

- Born: Thomas Ainslie; 18 December 1860 Lasswade, Scotland
- Died: 16 March 1926 (aged 65) Edinburgh, Scotland

Rugby union career
- Position: Forward
Amateur team(s)
Years	Team	Apps	(Points)
–	Edinburgh Institution F.P.		
Provincial / State sides
Years	Team	Apps	(Points)
1879–	East of Scotland District		
1879	Edinburgh District		
International career
Years	Team	Apps	(Points)
1881–1885	Scotland	12	(3)

19th President of the Scottish Rugby Union
- In office 1891–1892
- Preceded by: Gordon Mitchell
- Succeeded by: David Morton

Thomas Ainslie (18 December 1860 – 16 March 1926) was a Scotland international rugby union football player.

== Rugby Union career ==
=== Amateur career ===
Ainslie played for Edinburgh Institution F.P.

=== Provincial career ===
Ainslie played for Edinburgh District in the 1879 and 1880 inter-city.

Ainslie played for East of Scotland District in the March 1879 and January 1880 match.

=== International career ===
He was capped 12 times for Scotland between 1881 and 1885.

=== Administrative career ===
Ainslie became the 19th President of the Scottish Rugby Union. He served the 1891–92 term in office.

== Family ==
Ainslie was the brother of Robert Ainslie, who was also capped for Scotland.
