= Handley Brown =

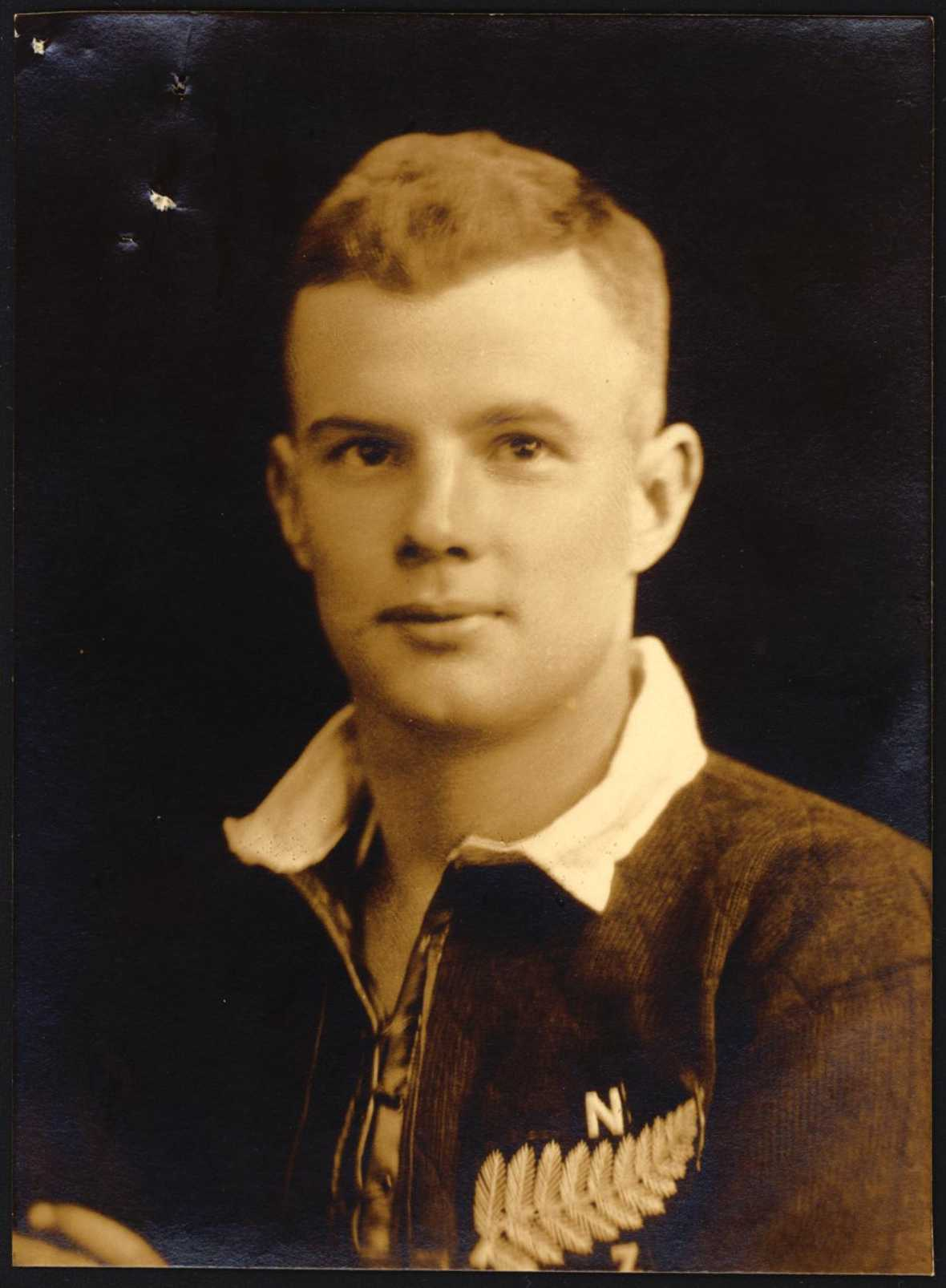
- Born: Handley Welbourn Brown; 29 August 1904 Inglewood, New Zealand
- Died: 5 December 1973 (aged 69) New Plymouth, New Zealand
- Height: 1.75 m (5 ft 9 in)
- Weight: 73 kg (161 lb)
- School: New Plymouth Boys' High School
- Notable relative(s): Ross Brown (son); Henry Brown (brother)

Rugby union career
- Position: Centre
Provincial / State sides
Years	Team	Apps	(Points)
1923–30	Taranaki	49	
International career
Years	Team	Apps	(Points)
1924–26	New Zealand	0	(0)

Handley Welbourn Brown (29 August 1904 – 5 December 1973) was a New Zealand rugby union player. A centre three-quarter, Brown represented Taranaki at a provincial level, and was a member of the New Zealand national side, the All Blacks, from 1924 to 1926. He played 20 matches for the All Blacks, scoring 35 points, but did not appear in any internationals.

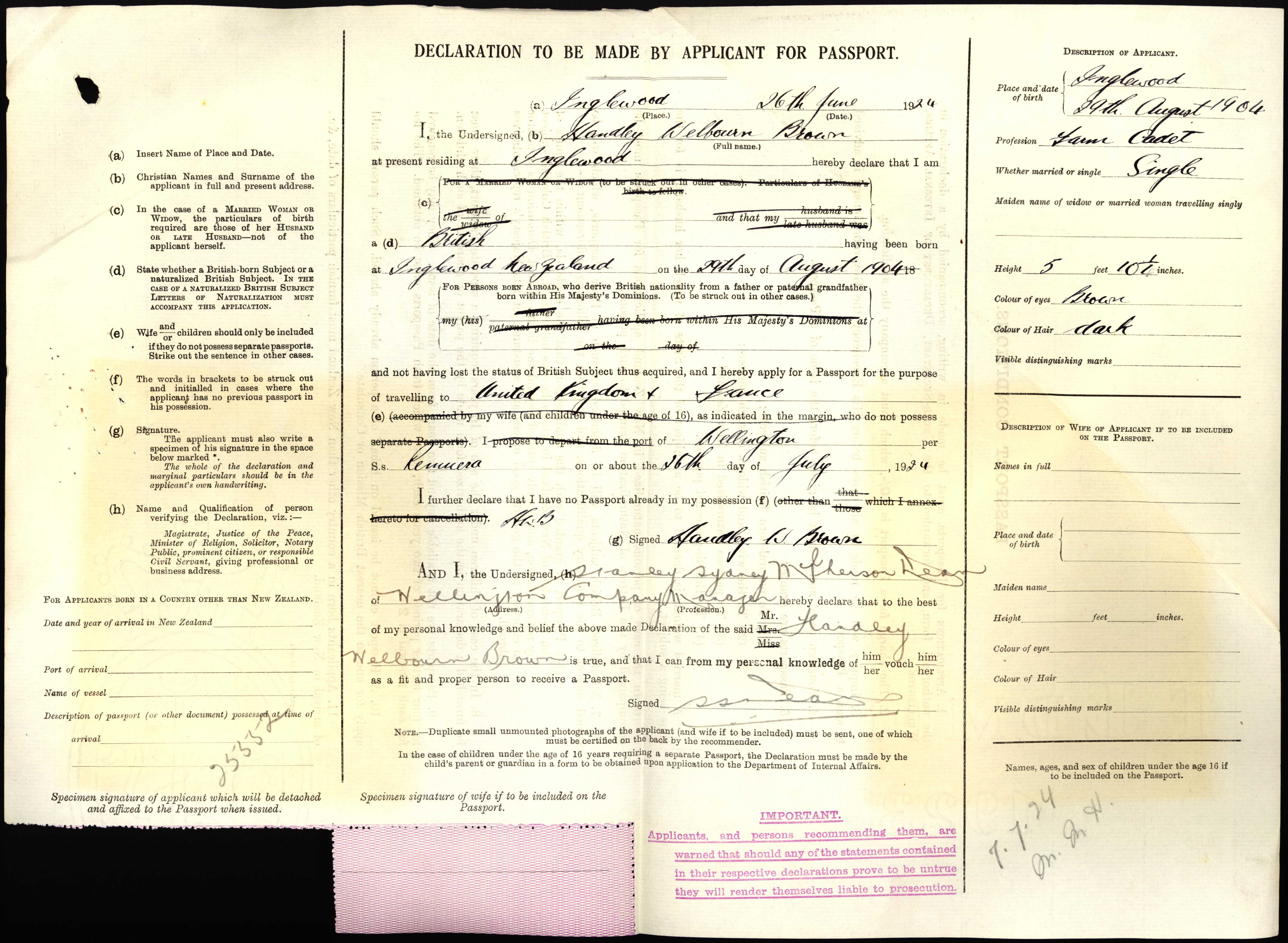
Handley Brown passport application (1924)

Handley Brown played 49 games for Taranaki between 1923 and 1930.

His son Ross Brown, nicknamed Pascoe, played 144 matches for Taranaki from 1953 to 1968 and 25 matches for the All Blacks from 1955 to 1962.
