= Bill Marrott =

Australia international rugby union player

- Born: William J. Marrott c. 1900

Rugby union career
- Position: number eight
International career
Years	Team	Apps	(Points)
1922–23	Wallabies	7	(6)

William J. Marrott (born c. 1900) was a rugby union player who represented Australia.

Marrott, a number eight, claimed a total of 7 international rugby caps for Australia. His brother Robert was also an Australian rugby union representative player
