= Charles Purdue =

New Zealand rugby union player

- Born: Charles Alfred Purdue; 10 June 1874 Mataura, New Zealand
- Died: 10 October 1941 (aged 67) Invercargill, New Zealand
- Notable relative(s): Pat Purdue (brother); George Purdue (nephew)
- Occupation: Storeman

Rugby union career
- Position: Loose forward
Provincial / State sides
| Years | Team | Apps | (Points) |
| 1896–1905 | Southland | | |
International career
| Years | Team | Apps | (Points) |
| 1901, 1905 | New Zealand | 1 | (0) |

Charles Alfred Purdue (10 June 1874 – 10 October 1941) was a New Zealand rugby union player. A loose forward, Purdue represented Southland at a provincial level. He was a member of the New Zealand national side in 1901 and 1905, appearing in three matches including an international against the touring Australian team at Dunedin in 1905. Also playing in that match was his brother Pat Purdue, the pair becoming the first brothers to play in the same test for New Zealand.

Purdue died in Invercargill on 10 October 1941, and was buried at the city's Eastern Cemetery.
