= Keith Geddes (rugby union) =

Scotland international rugby union player

- Born: Keith Irvine Geddes; 25 October 1918
- Died: 30 March 1991 (aged 72)
- School: Loretto School
- University: Gonville and Caius College, Cambridge

Rugby union career
Amateur team(s)
Years	Team	Apps	(Points)
- Cambridge University RUFC
–	London Scottish		
International career
Years	Team	Apps	(Points)
1947	Scotland	4	

Keith Irvine Geddes (25 October 1918 – 30 March 1991) was a Scottish rugby union player.

== Career ==
Geddes was educated at Loretto School and Gonville and Caius College, Cambridge.

Geddes played for Cambridge University R.U.F.C. in The Varsity Match in 1938 and served with No. 604 Squadron RAF in World War 2, winning the Distinguished Flying Cross.

He was capped four times for Scotland in 1947 and captained Scotland in his first two matches, against France and Wales. He also played for London Scottish FC.

He was the son of Irvine Geddes, who was also capped for Scotland and who also captained Scotland, in the Calcutta Cup match of 1908.

== Bibliography ==
- Bath, Richard (ed.), The Scotland Rugby Miscellany. Vision Sports Publishing Ltd, 2007. ISBN 1-905326-24-6.
- Griffiths, John, The Phoenix Book of International Rugby Records. Phoenix House / J. M. Dent & Sons, London, 1987. ISBN 0-460-07003-7
