= Matthew Wintle =

Wales international rugby union player

- Full name: Matthew Edward Wintle
- Born: 12 February 1972 (age 54) Cefn Cribwr, Wales
- Height: 6 ft 0 in (183 cm)
- Weight: 203 lb (92 kg)

Rugby union career
- Position: Centre
International career
Years	Team	Apps	(Points)
1996	Wales	1	(0)

Matthew Edward Wintle (born 12 February 1972) is a Welsh former rugby union international.

Wintle grew up in Kenfig Hill and attended Cynffig Comprehensive School. Moving to London to study medicine, he played his early senior rugby for London Welsh, but returned to Wales in 1992 and signed with Llanelli.

A centre, Wintle was capped once for Wales, in a win over Italy at Cardiff Arms Park in 1996. His elder brother Richard, who was also a three-quarter, had claimed a solitary Wales cap himself eight years earlier.

Wintle, a medical graduate of Cardiff University, relocated to San Diego in the early 2000s and became Global Medical Director of Amylin Pharmaceuticals. He has since returned to the United Kingdom.

== See also ==
- List of Wales national rugby union players
