= James Walker (sportsman) =

Scotland international rugby union player and cricketer

- Born: James George Walker; 9 October 1859 Tradeston, Glasgow, Scotland
- Died: 24 March 1923 (aged 63) Nether Auchendrane, Ayr, Scotland
- Notable relative(s): Archibald Walker, brother

Rugby union career
- Position: Forward
Amateur team(s)
Years	Team	Apps	(Points)
- Oxford University
–	West of Scotland		
International career
Years	Team	Apps	(Points)
1882-83	Scotland	2	(0)

James George Walker (9 October 1859 – 24 March 1923) was a Scotland international rugby union player; and a Scotland international cricketer.

== Rugby Union career ==
=== Amateur career ===
Walker was born in Tradeston, Glasgow. He was educated at Loretto School and Trinity College, Oxford, where he matriculated in 1879, and graduated B.A. in 1883. He captained the Oxford University side and then played for West of Scotland

He was noted by the Athletic News as a 'working forward and very efficient with his feet; in other words, he was a sound dribbler.'

=== International career ===
At rugby union, was capped twice for Scotland between 1882 and 1883.

== Cricket career ==
He played first-class cricket for Oxford University and Middlesex, and represented the Scotland national cricket team.

Mr. Walker often played cricket for West of Scotland, Grange, Fettesian-Lorettonians, and in the second visit of the Australian XI. scored in game at Titwood, Glasgow. He was for many years one of Scotland's most accomplished, all-round sportsmen, and the large number of mourners his funeral was tribute the esteem and admiration in which was held.

From the Cricket magazine of 25 February 1886:

MR. JAMES GEORGE WALKER. SCOTTISH cricket, as every one has noticed with the greatest satisfaction, has shown a marked advance during the last few years. It is hardly necessary to adduce proofs in support of the statement. There is plenty of evidence in the records, some of them even of a sensational character, of native Scotch players just recently. To the attention shown to the cultivation of proper form in the principal Schools on the other side of the border, is in a great - measure due the improvement in the so noticeable among cricketers of play l tch extraction. Fettes and Loretto, the latter in particular, have furnished during the last few years, considering their limited resources, a very respectable proportion of cricketers to the two English Universities. Born in Glasgow on Oct. 9,1859, Scotland is entitled to the credit of Mr. Walker's early education. Sent to Loretto in his thirteenth year, he secured a place in the School cricket eleven in the summer of 1875, when not yet sixteen. His performances at School from 1875 to 1879 were distinctly above the average. In 1878 and 1879, in the last of which he was Captain, in particular, he scored heavily, and he left Loretto with a high reputation as an all • round cricketer. During the winter of 1879 Mr. Walker went into residence at Trinity College, Oxford, but though tried once in 1880 he failed to get his blue. That he was in capital form, though, was proved satisfactorily later in the season, and his brilliant performance at Glasgow at the end of that summer against the Australians will not soon be forgotten, particularly by Glasgowegians. Playing for Eighteen of the Clydesdale Club he defied for a long time all the best Colonial bowling, and his score of eighty-five in that match was one of the best innings made against the Second Australian Team. This brilliant performance gave him, as was only to be expected, a high reputation, and the authorities at Oxford were hopeful that he would prova a valuable acquisition in the following seas His opening performance of 1881, too, was of a kind to fully justify these expectations, a his first score of 81 out of 178 in the Seniors' match was an excellent display of crick it. Unfortunately, though, a severe attack of bronchitis put an end to his chances of cricket for the year, and he was prevented from playing in any of the Oxford matches during that summer—a great disappointment, it will be readily understood. The following season saw another old Lorettonian, Mr. Norman McLachlan, Captain of the Oxford University Eleven, and again Mr. Walker was seen to advantage in the earliest of the trial fixtures. His 55 in the Seniors' match secured him a place in the Eleven against the Sixteen Freshmen, and in this as well as in the next match, for the Twelve against the Next Sixteen, he showed capital cricket, being highest scorer for his side with 25 and 67 in the former, and second in the latter with 42. Though only moderately successful against the Australians he came out well in the next two fixtures—against M.C.C. and Ground and the Gentlemen of England—contributing 87 by steady cricket in the first, and 60 in his first innings in the second of these two engagements. His batting in 1882 at Oxford was particularly effective, but in London, on the other hand, he was most unfortunate. Against M.C.C. at Lord's he was credited with 15 and 5, but at the Oval he failed to score either time, and in the University match he had to be content with 6 runs as the result of his two innings. Though he did not figure so well in the trial matches of Oxford in 1883, in the more important matches he was proportionately fortunate, and his cricket throughout the season was excellent in every sense. His highest scores in the earlier matches were his 93 and 29 against the Gentlemen, but he rarely failed to make a good show, and his 63 in the opening fixture against M.C.C. was, perhaps, his best innings. Against Cambridge, at Lord's, too, his batting was of the greatest use, and his second score of 51, for which he was two hours and ten minutes at the wickets, was an admirable display of defensive cricket. He played on a few occasions for M.C.C. in 1884, and with fair success, scoring 102 in six innings, of which 43 were made against Yorkshire —another good exhibition of defence. Mr. Walker has been actively identified of late years with the Free Foresters, and both for this club as well as for I Zingari, of which distinguished fraternity he is now a member, has done excellent service. His innings for the latter at Scarborough at the end of last summer against the Gentlemen of England will be remembered by CRICKET readers. On that occasion he went in first, and was not out till the total had reached 229 of which 111 had come from his bat. Mr. Walker is a thoroughly sound bat with very strong defence. He is particularly good on soft or difficult wickets, as he watches the ball most carefully. He cuts particularly well, and has a good stroke on the leg side—a pushing stroke in front of short leg. Ho is a most painstaking field, usually taking point, where though somewhat slow he is sure. Mr. Walker has also an excellent record as a football player at the Rugby Union game. He played for Oxford against Cambridge, and also for Scotland on three occasions. He was Captain of the Oxford team in 1883, but had to give up the game, having sprained his ankle when playing for Scotland against Wales. Mr. Walker, who is reading for the English bar, will be qualified next summer to play for Middlesex, by residence.

His death was marked by the Coatbridge Leader of 7 April 1923:

DEATH OF J. G. WALKER On Wednesday, 23 March, the last respects were made to one of Scotland's most distinguished cricketers. when the earthly remains of J. G. Walker of Nether uckeudrone, near Ayr, were laid to rest in the Glasgow Necropolis. Few Scottish public school cricketer* have risen to such high in English cricket as was attained by this gentleman. Educated at Loretto School, 3fusselburgh. he proceeded to Trinity College, Oxford where he had a distinguished career, both as a scholar and as an all-round sportsman, had earned fame at school as a prominent Rugby football player, and he developed his skill at Oxford and notably that he was appointed captain of the University Fifteen and captained the University Eleven in 1881 season. For a season or so before finally coming north for good, he captained the Middlesex County Cricket Eleven. It was in 1881 season, when captain of Oxford University Cricket Eleven, that he accepted an invitation from the Glasgow Clydesdale Cricket Club to play for cricket team at Titwood against the Australian Eleven. captained by the late Willie Murdoch one of the beat batsmen that has ever represented Australia in this cmintry. In this game sixteen of Clydestlak, were opposed to the powerful Australian Eleven• which included 11Iiirdoeh (captain); Spidforth, the demon howler: George Palmer. whom Lord Harris described as about the most difficult bowler to sore off. that ever he had been tip against : Percy Macdonnell, a beautiful Sydney University batsman: George Giffen. the great South Australian cricketer, who in his Glth year am; given a complimentary benefit at Adelaide last January when Clem Hill turned nut in his bottom. and placed a splendid innings of over sixty runs; H. F. Boyle. a splendid medium-paced howler, who resembled the great W. G. Grace in physique and looks; giant George Bonner. the mighty hitter: the great stamper. Blackham. etc. The Clydesdale sixteen comprised the following twelve plays.rs of that club. viz.—W. R. McCormick. Bob Dempeter. George Wilson. Tom Bry-den, P. Patullo. John Kennedy. Harry Clifford, W. Blare. W. Strachan. A. Cunningham. Torn Highet and J. Barclay. The four recruits who assisted them were J. G. Walker, Oxford University XT.: Alec. Watson, Drumpellier C.C. and Lancashire County XI; David Crichton and Willie Copeland. Driunpellier C.C. The game was drawn, hut greatly in favour of the Clydesdale sixteen. All the Drumpellier men came off, while the late T. G. Walker achieved a regular Potting triumph. Going in first, he played himself in. and afterwards defied the howling strength of the "Aussie" for two hones. hitting up a splendid S. I was present and saw his masterly display of batting. never dreaming that in n season or so tor would often he meeting this duet et ieketer in our annual matches with Lasswade. Grange. West of Scotland and the Whitelaw " Screws." The first time Drumnellier Eleven met J G. Walker was in 1853 season in a match against a powerful Lasswade side at the beautiful grounds of Polton, helon:'ing to the late W. M. Romervill, uncle of the celebrated Caldwell brothers. The Lasswade team was as follows:—J. G. Walker (captain). H. Caldwell. A. G. G. Asher. H. B. Tristram. C J. Paterson. A .R Don Wenchope W. McLeod. J. Johnston. W. M. Someryill. Shacklock (professionals and Butler (professional). The D.C.C. team in- eluded D Crichton (captain), J. Buchanan. John Thomson. James King. R. Shanks. Jack Brown. W. Capes. R. Scott. Sack Copeland. Bob Houston and Jack Lindsay. The ground being tricky. after some rain and sunshine, the howlers on loth sides had it all their own way. het the cote captaincy of Walker non the game by one run. The: manipulation of his bowling strength and brilliant fielding against a usually winning side, with brit 48 runs to get, will never he forgotten hf three present that day. In 1884 season we met at Raeburn Place when playing the Grange CC.: hut on this occasion J. G. was dismissed by a fine catch off Houston's howling by Jamie Ring before he had got set. In 1883 season playing against the Weld of Scotland we met for the first time in Glasgow at Particle, where James Buchanan heat and bowled the subject of thin appreciation with only three runs to his credit. The next time he played for the West of Scotland at Partick, he succeeded in getting set, and gave a splend, batting display of first clam defensive and offensive batting against us; hut we kept our record by drawing the game. In compiling his score of 84, I remember hint getting Houston round to leg by running a .5 for it. From 1880 season to 1887 season inalueice?, we had played 17 games with the Weed of Scotland .. winning 11. losing none. and drawing 8. This time we nearly rune cropper, and our sequence of wins cane to an end in 1888 season, when, after a fine exhibition of batting at Drumpeiller, were badly beaten in the return by four wickets, chiefly through the grated stand of Tom Anderson and Morris (professional J. G. Walker haring 8 runs to his credit At Drumpellier. in 1888 season. playing for the Whitelaw " Screws " XI. he put on a well-played 49. not out. He had visited Drumpellier Policies on three occasions that season, and was well-known by the great majority of the spectators as most formidable opponent. By the death of this prominent cricketer. I and others of his contemporaries, who are still lisping their wicket up. have lost a rained comrade, who always played the game in • beat spirit of sportsmanship. t Wed eeda, 28th March, his remains were followed to Glasgow Necropolis by a very presentative gathering of those who had enjoyed his personal friendship, cemented 0.1 the cricket field of bygone days. 0, '23rd June. 1906. a selondidly contested genie was played on North Inch. Perth. by Drumpellier v. Pte rth County. Winning the toss, the latter elected to bat and sent in Jae Anderson :cod Johnny Mailer to fare the howling of .7. and Hancock (professional). The first wicket fell at 28. Jae An 'erson being bundled nut neck and crop the Chesterfield man with In runs to f name. Dr Stuart filled the vacancy, but after, coring 5 rims he was finely taken at the wicket by young Jamie Girton off Johnny Cunningham's howling. Two wickets were down for 57 and three for 62. when Davie Burnfield fell to the Chesterfield man, who was healing at the top of bin form. Willie Stewart now partnered Johnny Mailer and a most prolific stand was made. the wore being doubled before Stewart's innings came to an end. He was cleverly caught by Johnny Cunningham off J. bowling. with a well played 26 to his name. Lovat Fraser. who came next, In.t. Mailer at the latter's share being 7' compiled by outstanding batsmanship against excellent trundling. Mellor had one 5 hit and nine 4s. the rest being two and singles. The other,' added just 26 to the total. none of them getting into double figures. The captain and Hancock cleared them nut in double quick time, the innings realising 157 all out. Hancock raptured nix wicket,. for 57 runs. J. 31'11111an three for 51. and Johnny Cunningham one for 41 rime. • With limited time to get 158 to win the Drnmpellier opened with V. T. 'Mennen and A. 51^.1fillan again/it the bowling of Henderson and Higgins. Ten rum were put on for the loos of Meninx's wicket; then Willie Jardine joined A. :11`11iIlan and the total was taken to 43 before 71I^Millan was bowled by Henderson with 12 rears to his credit. it. D. Peebles next partnered Jardine. but boat him before another rim was scored through his being badly run out. alien will set, with a well earners 25 to his name. Johnny LOP joined Peebles a hen thr.,• wickets-had fallen for runs, and. both playing fine cricket. they carried the total to 114 for four wickets down. After gathering 40 runs. the lest-hander was caught lir Dr Stuart off Higuin's bowling. Hancock filled the but was snapped at the wicket without scoring, while J. McMillan who came next. was run out with a single to his name. A. J. J. Carter, partnering Lee, lost him with the total at 119, Lee's individual score being a good 30. A. P. Skeil joined his scholastic friend and together they brought the total to 149 without further disaster, young Carter taking out his bat for an opportune 20 while Skeil had 9 runs to his credit. The game thus ended in a draw.

== Other sports ==
He was captain of the Prestwick Golf club.

He presented a trophy for golf; to be played between players from Scotland and England. The newspapers reported this as 'another Walker Cup', likening it to the UK - American golfing tournament.

== Law career ==
After graduating at Oxford, Walker studied law and was called to the bar at the Inner Temple in 1886.

== Family ==
He was born to Archibald Walker (1815–80) and Mary MacFarlane Smith (1826-1913). He had siblings:- Archibald Walker (1858-1945), who was also capped in rugby union for Scotland; Mary Smith Walker; and Agnes Walker.

He died in 1923, leaving an unsettled estate then valued at £639,000.

== See also ==
- List of Scottish cricket and rugby union players
