= Gardyne Maitland =

Scotland international rugby union player

Gardy Maitland
- Born: Gardyne Maitland; 7 December 1865 Alloa, Scotland
- Died: 13 February 1907 (aged 41) Kolkata, India

Rugby union career
- Position: Centre
Amateur team(s)
Years	Team	Apps	(Points)
- Edinburgh Institution F.P.
Provincial / State sides
Years	Team	Apps	(Points)
1884-85	East of Scotland District		
1884-85	Edinburgh District		
International career
Years	Team	Apps	(Points)
1885	Scotland	2	(0)

Gardyne Maitland (7 December 1865 – 13 February 1907) was a Scotland international rugby union player.

== Rugby Union career ==
=== Amateur career ===
He played for Edinburgh Institution F.P.

=== Provincial career ===
He played for East of Scotland District in the 1884 and 1885 trial matches against West of Scotland District.

He played for Edinburgh District in the 1884 and 1885 inter-city matches against Glasgow District.

=== International career ===
He was capped twice for Scotland in 1885.

== Family ==
He was born in Alloa, Clackmannanshire, to Mary Gardyne (1827-1881) and Charles Maitland (1819-1898).

He was the brother of Robert Maitland who was also capped for Scotland.

== Death ==
He died in the General Hospital of Kolkata on 13 February 1907.
