= Edinburgh Institution F.P. =

Defunct Scottish rugby union club, based in Edinburgh

- Full name: Edinburgh Institution Former Pupils Rugby Club
- Founded: c.1871-1872
- Disbanded: 1936

Edinburgh Institution F.P. is a former Edinburgh rugby union club, formed as the Edinburgh Institution Former Pupils club. It was open to the former pupils of the Edinburgh Institution school. The side won the unofficial Scottish Championship twice; in seasons 1880-81 and in 1881–82.

== Edinburgh Institution ==
The Edinburgh Institution was a school in Edinburgh founded by Rev. Robert Cunningham in 1832. Cunningham, previously a schoolteacher in Steele's Hospital, Tranent and then headmaster of George Watson's Hospital, was frustrated by the teachings of both schools.

Cunningham felt that too much time was taken on teaching the pupils classics. His institute would focus on Mathematics, Sciences and Languages. Initially in George Street, the Institute moved to Hill Street then Queen St in Edinburgh.

== Formation ==
The Edinburgh Institution Former Players rugby union club was founded either in late 1871 or in 1872. R. M. Neill, the father of two Edinburgh Academical players, helped found the club.

Former rugby players of the Institution were plentiful but initially the side had difficulty attracting players. Many former players were already playing their rugby for other clubs. For example John McFarlane captained Edinburgh University and Nat Brewis played for Royal HSFP.

== Early history ==
Initially J. J. Deuchar captained the side. As the team improved Nat Brewis took over the captaincy. Within ten years the club won the Scottish Unofficial Championship and was - together with Edinburgh Academicals and Glasgow Academicals - considered one of the top club sides in Scotland.

== Sevens tournament ==
Edinburgh Institution F.P. hosted their first rugby sevens tournament in 1921.

== Institution move and rename ==
The Edinburgh Institution moved from its premises in Queen St to Melville St. in Edinburgh in 1920. Shortly after this move, the Institution was renamed Melville College in 1936.

The rugby union club was also renamed Melville College FP.

== Notable former players ==
=== Scotland internationalists ===
The following former Edinburgh Institution FP players have represented Scotland at full international level.

- (Scotland) Robert Ainslie
- (Scotland) Nat Brewis
- (Scotland) David Somerville
- (Scotland) Thomas Ainslie
- (Scotland) Hopper Brown
- (Scotland) James Holt Marsh
- (Scotland) Gardyne Maitland
- (Scotland) William Masters
- (Scotland) Robert Maitland
- (Scotland) Andrew Philp

=== Edinburgh District ===
The following former Edinburgh Institution FP players have represented Edinburgh District at provincial level.

- (Scotland) Robert Ainslie
- (Scotland) Thomas Ainslie
- (Scotland) Andrew Philp

== Honours ==
- Gala Sevens
  - Runners Up (1): 1906

== SRU presidents ==
Former Edinburgh Institution players have been President of the SRU:

- 1885–86 Nat Brewis
- 1887–88 William Sorley Brown
