= Charles Speight (rugby union) =

- Born: Charles Richard Barton Speight; 13 July 1870 Auckland, New Zealand
- Died: 23 December 1935 (aged 65) Hamilton, New Zealand
- Weight: 78 kg (172 lb)
- Notable relative: Michael Speight (great-grandson)

Rugby union career
- Position: Forward
Provincial / State sides
Years	Team	Apps	(Points)
1892–97	Auckland	12	
International career
Years	Team	Apps	(Points)
1893	New Zealand	0	(0)

Charles Richard Barton Speight (13 July 1870 – 23 December 1935) was a New Zealand rugby union player. A forward, who came out of the Parnell club, Speight represented Auckland at a provincial level. He was a member of the New Zealand national side in 1893, playing seven tour matches for the team.

After moving to Hamilton, Speight served as a member of the Hamilton Borough Council and the Waikato Trotting Club committee. He died in Hamilton on 23 December 1935 and was buried at Hamilton East Cemetery.

His brother, Harold Murray Hamilton Speight, also represented Auckland in 1894.
