= 1885–86 Scottish Districts season =

Rugby union competition

- Countries: Scotland
- Date: 1885-86
- Matches played: 3

The 1885–86 Scottish Districts season is a record of all the rugby union matches for Scotland's district teams.

It includes the East of Scotland District versus West of Scotland District trial match.

== History ==
The Hamilton Crescent ground was being re-turfed, so the Inter-City was played at Hampden Park for the first time that any rugby match was played there. The match was played in splendid weather. The Leeds Mercury reported that the match was the finest rugby match ever played in Glasgow; and that the attendance was the largest ever for a rugby match in Glasgow.

== Results ==
Date	Try	Conversion	Penalty	Dropped goal	Goal from mark	Notes
1876–1885	1 try	1 goal	1 goal	1 goal	—N/a	
1876–1885	Match decided by a majority of goals, or if the number of goals is equal by a majority of tries					

=== Inter-City ===
5 December 1885

Glasgow District	1 goal, 1 try - 2 tries	Edinburgh District
Try: D. A. McLeod; Drop: M. F. Reid	Report	Try: Morrison x 2

Hampden Park, Glasgow
Referee: J. A. Gardner (Hon. Sec. SRU)

Glasgow District: F. McIndoe (Glasgow Academicals), A. E. Stephen (West of Scotland), M. F. Reid (West of Scotland), R. G. Eaglesham (West of Scotland), C. E. Orr (West of Scotland), C. F. P. Fraser (Glasgow University), G. Ker (Glasgow Academicals), W. A. Walls (Glasgow Academicals), J. French (Glasgow Academicals), J. G. Mitchell (West of Scotland), D. Morton (West of Scotland), C. J. B. Milne (West of Scotland), J. E. Orr (West of Scotland), W. A. Macdonald (1st Lanarkshire Rifle Volunteers), D. McLeod (West of Scotland).
Edinburgh District: Cameron (Watsonians), G. Maitland (Edinburgh Institution F.P.), R. H. Morrison (Edinburgh University), Evans (Edinburgh Institution F.P.), A. G. G. Asher (Edinburgh Wanderers), A. R. Don-Wauchope (Edinburgh Wanderers), C. Reid, W. Huskie, T. Ainslie (Edinburgh Institution F.P.), J. McLeod (Edinburgh Institution F.P.), G. Henderson (Edinburgh Institution F.P.), J. Horsburgh Duke (Royal HSFP), J. Tod (Watsonians)

=== Other Scottish matches ===
2 January 1886

North of Scotland District	0 - 3 gls, 3 tries	Glasgow District
	Report	Try: Robertson; Findlay; French; Brown; Martin; Stephen; Con: Fraser x 3

Forthill, Broughty Ferry

North of Scotland District: Back, C. Low (Dundee High School); halt-backs, A. Stewart (St Andrews University), A. Wills (High School), and H. P. Stiven (Panmure); quarter-backs, J. C. Baird and R. Lawson (St Antirews); forwards, M. McKerracher, J. Hill, and T. Bell (St Andrews), T. C. Ferguson (captain), P. G. Grant, and E. Carmichael (High School), C. M. Stewart and F. Hay (Panmure), P. Stewart (Kirkcaldy).
Glasgow District: Back, F. Macindoe (Glasgow Academicals); half-backs, A. E. Stephen (West of Scotland), C. J. Higginbotham, and W. Robertson (Glasgow University); quarterbacks, C. E. Orr (West o£ Scotland) and C. F. P. Fraser (University); forwards, A. W. Young, J. B. Brown (captain), and J. French (Academicals), J. G. Mitchell, D. Morton, J. E. Orr, W. Neilson, and D. G. Findlay (West), and H. Edmiston (Clydesdale).

30 January 1886
3pm

East of Scotland District	1 try - 2 tries	West of Scotland District
Try: Morrison	Report	Try: Stephen; Robinson

Raeburn Place, Edinburgh
Attendance: 3,000
Referee: James Stewart Carrick

East: J. P. Veitch (Royal HSFP), R. H. Morrison (Edinburgh University), G. Wilson (Royal HSFP), R. D. Sewell (Fettesian- Loretonians), P. H. Don-Wauchope (Fettesian- Loretonians), A. R. Don-Wauchope (Fettesian- Loretonians), A. G. G. Asher (Fettesian- Loretonians), C. Reid (Edinburgh Academicals), T. W. Irvine (Edinburgh Academicals), J. Rankin (Watsonians), T. Ainslie (Edinburgh Institution F.P.) [captain], A. P. Clay (Edinburgh Academicals), M. McLeod (Edinburgh Wanderers), M. C. M‘Ewan (Edinburgh Academicals), A. Duke (Royal HSFP), G. Henderson (Edinburgh Institution F.P.).
West: F. McIndoe (Glasgow Academicals), A. E. Stephen (West of Scotland), M. F. Reid (West of Scotland), W. Robertson (Glasgow University), C. F. Fraser (Glasgow University), H. Nelson (West of Scotland); J. B. Brown (Glasgow Academicals) [captain], J. French (Glasgow Academicals), W. A. Walls (Glasgow Academicals), H. T. Ker (Glasgow Academicals), C. J. B. Milne (West of Scotland), J. G. Mitchell (West of Scotland), G. Findlay (West of Scotland), D. A. Macleod (Glasgow University), W. A. Macdonald (1st Lanarkshire Rifle Volunteers).

=== English matches ===
No other District matches played.

=== International matches ===
No touring matches this season.
