= Bill McEwan (rugby union) =

Scotland & South Africa international rugby union player

- Born: William Maclean Clark McEwan; 24 October 1875 Edinburgh, Scotland
- Died: 4 April 1934 (aged 58) Cape Town, South Africa

Rugby union career
- Position: Forward
Amateur team(s)
| Years | Team | Apps | (Points) |
- Edinburgh Academicals
Provincial / State sides
| Years | Team | Apps | (Points) |
- Edinburgh District
International career
| Years | Team | Apps | (Points) |
| 1894-1900 | Scotland | 16 | (3) |
| 1903 | South Africa | 2 | (0) |

William McEwan (24 October 1875 – 4 April 1934) was a Scotland rugby union player. On moving to South Africa, McEwan then also represented South Africa.

== Rugby Union career ==
=== Amateur career ===
He also played for Edinburgh Academicals.

=== Provincial career ===
McEwan was capped for Edinburgh District.

=== International career ===
He was capped sixteen times for Scotland between 1894 and 1900. He was also capped for South Africa.

== Family ==
He was the brother of Saxon McEwan, who was also capped for Scotland.
