= Robert Marrott =

Australia international rugby union player

- Born: Robert D. Marrott c. 1894

Rugby union career
- Position: hooker
International career
Years	Team	Apps	(Points)
1920	Wallabies	2	(3)

Robert D. Marrott (born c. 1894) was a rugby union player who represented Australia.

Marrott, a hooker, claimed a total of 2 international rugby caps for Australia. His brother Bill was also an Australian rugby union representative player.
