= Robert Maitland (rugby union) =

Scotland international rugby union player

- Born: Robert James Peebles Maitland; 7 January 1862 Alloa, Scotland
- Died: 1918 (aged 55–56) Clifton, New Jersey, United States

Rugby union career
- Position: Forward
Amateur team(s)
Years	Team	Apps	(Points)
- Edinburgh Institution F.P.
Provincial / State sides
Years	Team	Apps	(Points)
1881	East of Scotland District		
1881	Edinburgh District		
International career
Years	Team	Apps	(Points)
1881-85	Scotland	5	(0)

Robert Maitland was a Scotland international rugby union player.

== Rugby Union career ==
=== Amateur career ===
He also played for Edinburgh Institution F.P.

=== Provincial career ===
He played for East of Scotland District against West of Scotland District on 5 February 1881.

He played for Edinburgh District in their inter-city match against Glasgow District on 3 December 1881.

=== International career ===
He was capped five times for Scotland between 1881 and 1885.

== Family ==
He was born to Charles Maitland (1819-1898) and Mary Small Gardyne Maitland (1827-1881). Charles and Mary had 9 children; 6 boys and 3 girls. One of the boys, Robert's brother, was Gardyne Maitland who was also capped for Scotland.

Robert emigrated to the United States in 1892.
