= Pat Purdue =

- Born: Edward Purdue; 1878 Dipton, New Zealand
- Died: 16 July 1939 (aged 61) Invercargill, New Zealand
- Weight: 90 kg (200 lb)
- Notable relative(s): George Purdue (son); Charles Purdue (brother)
- Occupation: Railway worker

Rugby union career
- Position: Lock
Provincial / State sides
Years	Team	Apps	(Points)
1899–1905	Southland		
International career
Years	Team	Apps	(Points)
1905	New Zealand	1	(0)

Edward "Pat" Purdue (1878 – 16 July 1939) was a New Zealand rugby union player. A lock, Purdue represented Southland at a provincial level. He played just one match for the New Zealand national side, a test against the touring Australian team in 1905. Also appearing in that match was Purdue's brother, Charles, the pair becoming the first brothers to play in the same test for New Zealand.

Purdue died in Invercargill on 16 July 1939, and was buried at the city's Eastern Cemetery.
