= George Purdue =

- Born: George Bambery Purdue; 4 May 1909 Invercargill, New Zealand
- Died: 22 May 1981 (aged 72) Invercargill, New Zealand
- Height: 1.88 m (6 ft 2 in)
- Weight: 95 kg (209 lb)
- Notable relative(s): Pat Purdue (father); Charles Purdue (uncle)

Rugby union career
- Position(s): Lock; Flanker
Provincial / State sides
Years	Team	Apps	(Points)
1929–34	Southland	38	
International career
Years	Team	Apps	(Points)
1931	New Zealand Māori		
1931–32	New Zealand	4	(3)

George Bambery Purdue (4 May 1909 – 22 May 1981) was a New Zealand rugby union player. A lock and flanker, Purdue represented Southland at a provincial level, and was a member of the New Zealand national side, the All Blacks, in 1931 and 1932. He played seven matches for the All Blacks including four internationals. Of Ngāi Tahu descent, Purdue also played for New Zealand Māori in 1931.

Purdue died in Invercargill on 22 May 1981, and was buried at the city's Eastern Cemetery.
