= Henry Brown (rugby union) =

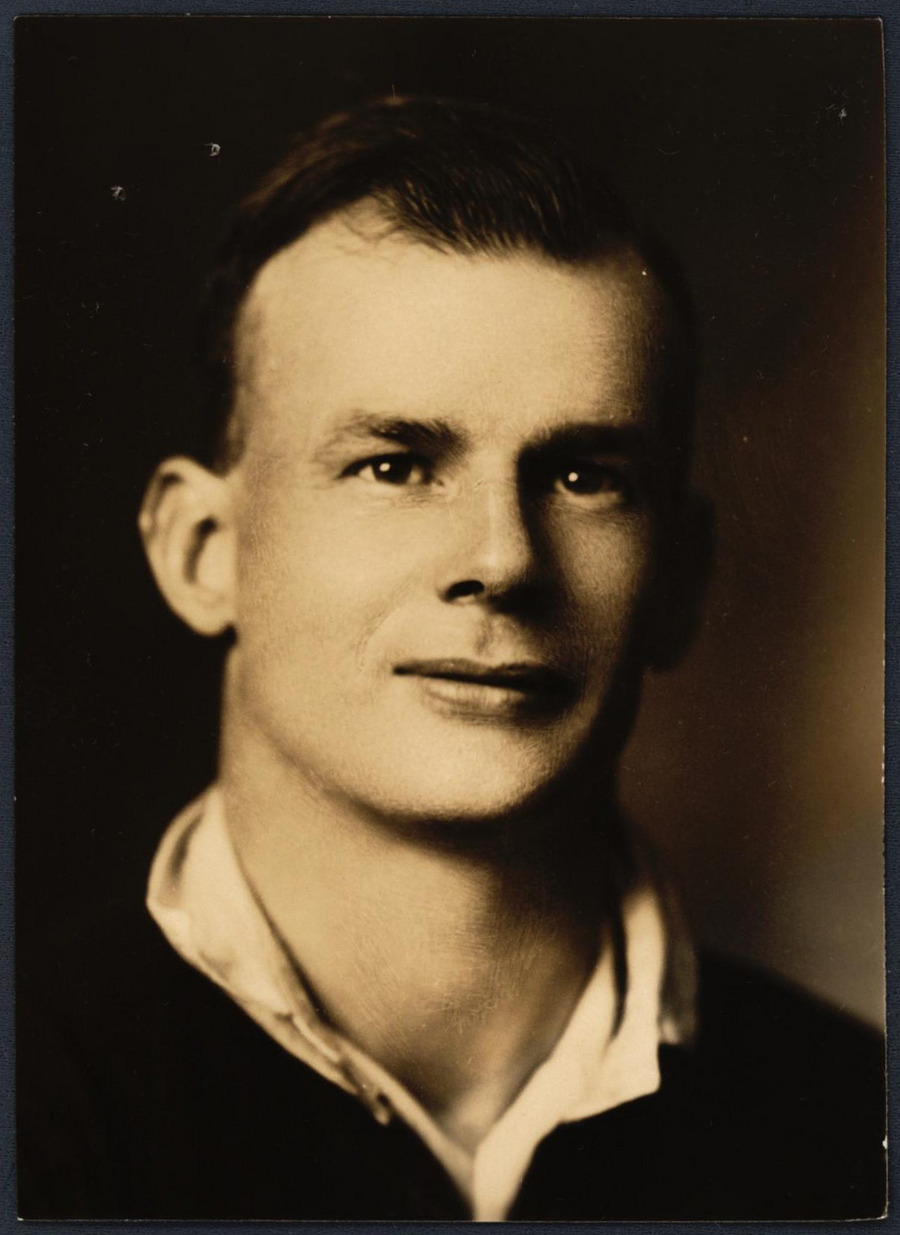
- Brown in 1935
- Born: Henry Mackay Brown; 14 June 1910 New Plymouth, New Zealand
- Died: 1 June 1965 (aged 54) New Plymouth, New Zealand
- Height: 1.73 m (5 ft 8 in)
- Weight: 68 kg (150 lb)
- School: New Plymouth Boys' High School
- Notable relative(s): Handley Brown (brother); Ross Brown (nephew)

Rugby union career
- Position: Wing
Provincial / State sides
Years	Team	Apps	(Points)
1930	King Country	1	
1935	Auckland	2	
1936	Poverty Bay	1	
International career
Years	Team	Apps	(Points)
1935–36	New Zealand	0	(0)

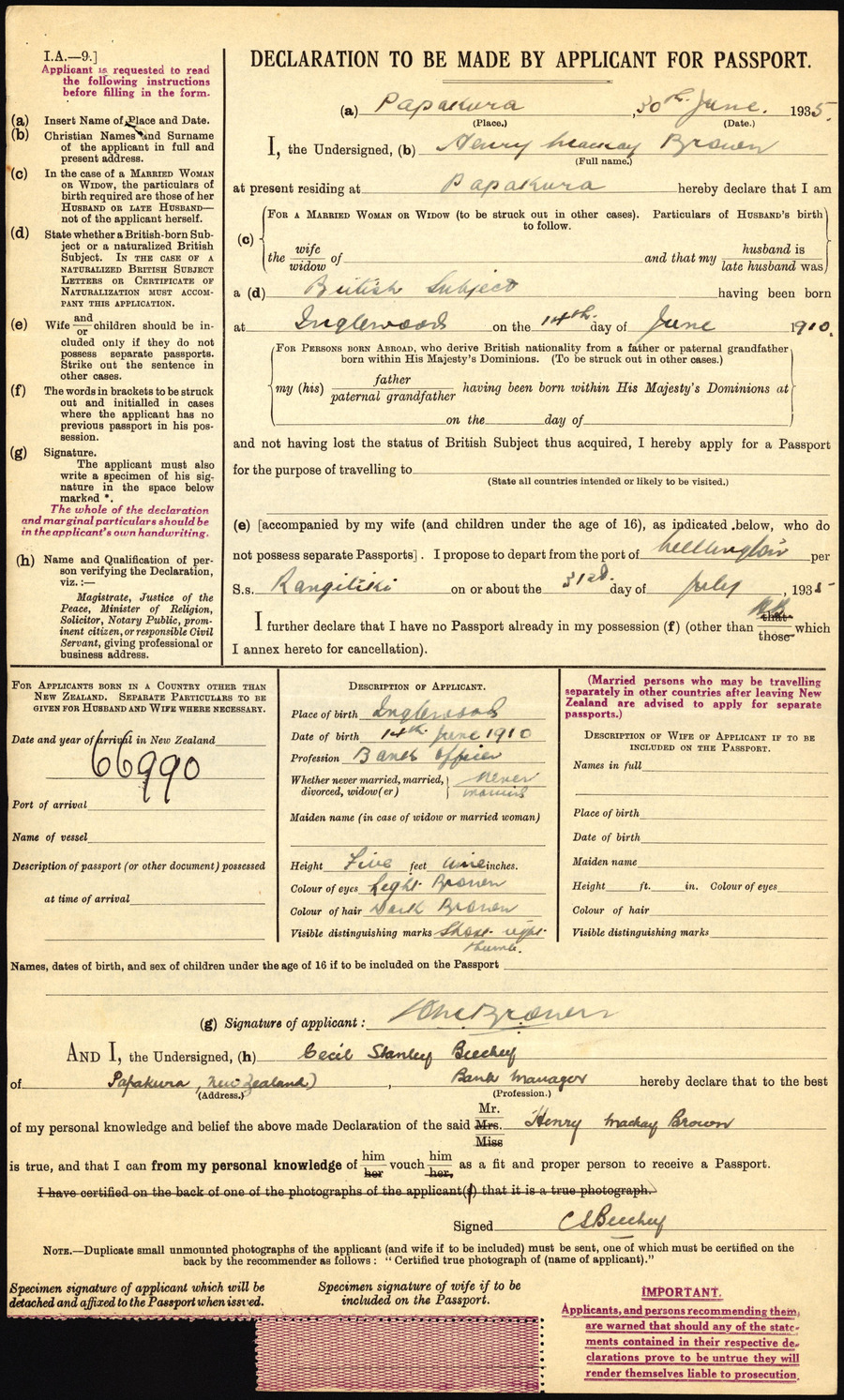
Henry Mackay Brown passport application (1935)

Henry Mackay Brown (14 June 1910 – 1 June 1965) was a New Zealand rugby union player. A wing, Brown represented King Country, Auckland, and Poverty Bay at a provincial level. He was a member of the New Zealand national side, the All Blacks, on their 1935–36 tour of Britain, Ireland and Canada. He played in eight matches on that tour, scoring five tries, but did not appear in any internationals.
