= Irvine Geddes =

Scotland international rugby union player

- Born: Irvine Campbell Geddes; 9 July 1882
- Died: 18 May 1962 (aged 79)

Rugby union career
Amateur team(s)
Years	Team	Apps	(Points)
- London Scottish
International career
Years	Team	Apps	(Points)
1906-08	Scotland	6	

Irvine Campbell Geddes (9 July 1882 – 18 May 1962) was a Scottish rugby union player.

He was capped six times between 1906 and 1908 for Scotland and captained Scotland in the 1908 Calcutta Cup match. He also played for London Scottish FC.

He was the father of Keith Geddes, who was also capped for Scotland.

== Bibliography ==
- Bath, Richard (ed.) The Scotland Rugby Miscellany (Vision Sports Publishing Ltd, 2007 ISBN 1-905326-24-6)
- Griffiths, John, The Phoenix Book of International Rugby Records. Phoenix House / J. M. Dent & Sons, London, 1987. ISBN 0-460-07003-7
