= Michael Speight =

- Born: Michael Wayne Speight; 24 February 1962 (age 64) Auckland, New Zealand
- Height: 1.95 m (6 ft 5 in)
- Weight: 103 kg (227 lb)
- School: Whangarei Boys' High School
- University: University of Waikato
- Notable relative: Charles Speight (great-grandfather)

Rugby union career
- Position: Lock
Provincial / State sides
Years	Team	Apps	(Points)
1983–85	Waikato	39	
1986–87	North Auckland	21	
1988, 1993	North Harbour	22	
International career
Years	Team	Apps	(Points)
1986	New Zealand	1	(0)

Michael Wayne Speight (born 24 February 1962) is a former New Zealand rugby union player. A lock, Speight represented Waikato, North Auckland and North Harbour at a provincial level, and was a member of the New Zealand national side, the All Blacks, in 1986. He played five matches for the All Blacks, including one international against Australia.
