= Richard Wintle =

Wales international rugby union player

- Full name: Richard Vivian Wintle
- Born: 11 December 1967 (age 58) Kenfig Hill, Wales
- Height: 5 ft 10 in (178 cm)
- Weight: 182 lb (83 kg)

Rugby union career
- Position: Wing
International career
Years	Team	Apps	(Points)
1988	Wales	1	(0)

Richard Vivian Wintle (born 11 December 1967) is a Welsh former rugby union international.

Wintle, born in Kenfig Hill, was a student at Cynffig Comprehensive School. A speedy winger, who won the Wales AAA 200 metres title as a teenager, he represented Wales in under-15s and schoolboys rugby.

While studying medicine at St Mary's Hospital, London, Wintle competed for London Welsh and in 1988 was capped for Wales in a home Test against Western Samoa, coming on as a substitute for Carwyn Davies.

Wintle switched to Bridgend RFC in 1989, making the commute from London to train and play. He slipped out of international reckoning, in part due to medical commitments, but continued to play during the 1990s, for clubs including Swansea and Caerphilly. His younger brother Matthew Wintle was capped for Wales in 1996.

== See also ==
- List of Wales national rugby union players
