= 1887–88 Scottish Districts season =

Rugby union competition

- Countries: Scotland
- Date: 1887–88
- Matches played: 1

The 1887–88 Scottish Districts season is a record of all the rugby union matches for Scotland's district teams.

It includes the East of Scotland District versus West of Scotland District trial match.

== History ==
The North of Scotland District was founded in this year. Initially known as the Scottish Northern Counties Football Union, on 24 November 1887 a meeting was held in Watson's Restaurant in Aberdeen to elect office bearers. Those noted were:- George Cruden (President); D. M. Milligan (Vice President); C. Sleigh (Secretary).

Rules of the North of Scotland District were agreed on 2 December 1887.

A North of Scotland District match was arranged with Glasgow District to take place in Cupar on 31 December 1887. Another match was arranged with Edinburgh District on 21 January 1888 in Aberdeen.

Owing to frost, the planned match between the North and Glasgow had to be abandoned. It is noted that a great many matches were postponed in January and February; and it seems the planned Edinburgh District match was also abandoned. North of Scotland did manage a match against Merchiston Castle - but it was noted that it was played in a blizzard.

Edinburgh District won back the Inter-City for the first time in 4 years.

The East v West match was postponed from 28 January 1888. It was played on 11 February 1888 and the East won.

== Results ==
Date	Try	Conversion	Penalty	Dropped goal	Goal from mark	Notes
1886–1891	1 point	2 points	3 points	3 points	—N/a	Scoring systems after the administration of the game was taken over by the IRFB now known as World Rugby

=== Inter-City ===
3 December 1887

Glasgow District	0 - 2 goals, 3 tries	Edinburgh District
	Report

Hamilton Crescent, Glasgow
Referee: A. B. Blair

Glasgow District:
Edinburgh District:

=== Other Scottish matches ===
11 February 1888

East of Scotland District	2 goals, 3 tries - 0	West of Scotland District
	Report; Report

Raeburn Place, Edinburgh

East:
West:

14 March 1888

North of Scotland District	3 - 3	Merchiston Castle School
Try: W. Neilson; Con: Reid	Report	Try: Brown; Con: Kelly

Holburn Park, Aberdeen
Referee: C. Duff

North of Scotland District:
Merchiston Castle:

=== English matches ===
No other District matches played.

=== International matches ===
No touring matches this season.
