= 1886–87 Scottish Districts season =

Rugby union competition

- Countries: Scotland
- Date: 1886–87
- Matches played: 2

The 1886–87 Scottish Districts season is a record of all the rugby union matches for Scotland's district teams.

It includes the East of Scotland District versus West of Scotland District trial match.

== History ==
Glasgow won the Inter-City by a try to nil. The Greenock Telegraph and Clyde Shipping Gazette of 6 December 1886 reporting the match: "Played at Anniesland, Glasgow, on Saturday, in good weather. At the start of the game Edinburgh had the best of it for about fifteen minutes, but thereafter they had to act on the defensive. Although at half-time no scoring had taken place the second period was much in favour of Glasgow, for whom Kerr gained a try twenty minutes from time, which was not improved on."

The East v West fixture was marred by a leg break to Asher, the East District quarter-back.

== Results ==
| Date | Try | Conversion | Penalty | Dropped goal | Goal from mark | Notes |
|---|---|---|---|---|---|---|
| 1886–1891 | 1 point | 2 points | 3 points | 3 points | —N/a | Scoring systems after the administration of the game was taken over by the IRFB now known as World Rugby |

=== Inter-City ===
4 December 1886

| Glasgow District | 1 - 0 | Edinburgh District |
| Try: Kerr | Report |

Old Anniesland, Glasgow
Attendance: 3,000
Referee: James Stewart Carrick

Glasgow District: Macindoe (Glasgow Academicals), C. J. Higginbotham (Glasgow University), M. F. Reid (West of Scotland), A. M. Woodrow (Glagow Academicals), H. Neilson (West of Scotland), C. J. Fraser (Glasgow University), H. Kerr (Glasgow Academicals), T. French (Glasgow Academicals), R. Young (Glasgow Academicals), J. G. Mitchell (West of Scotland), J. McMillan (West of Scotland), D. Morton (West of Scotland), A. Malcolm (Clydesdale), W. McDonald (1st Lanarkshire Rifle Volunteers)
Edinburgh District: A. W. Cameron (Watsonians), W. Macfarlane (Royal HSFP), G. Wilson (Royal HSFP), Marsh (Edinburgh Institution F. P.), P. H. Don Wauchope (Edinburgh Wanderers), D. M. Orr (Edinburgh Academicals), Reid Irvine (Edinburgh Academicals), McEwen (Edinburgh Academicals), Berry (Edinburgh Wanderers), Milne (Edinburgh Wanderers), McLeod (Edinburgh Wanderers), Duke (Royal HSFP), Stevenson (Edinburgh University), Huskie (Edinburgh University)

=== Other Scottish matches ===
29 January 1887

| East of Scotland District | 5 - 4 | West of Scotland District |
| Try: Johnstone; Stevenson; Irvine; Con: Berry | Report | Try: Fraser; C.E. Orr; Con: M. F. Reid |

Raeburn Place, Edinburgh

East: A. W. Cameron back G. R. Wilson (Royal High School), J. Marsh (Edinburgh Institution), and R. H. Morrison (Edinburgh University), half backs; A. G. G. Asher (Wanderers) and C. Johnston (Edinburgh University), quarter backs; C. Reid (Edinburgh Academicals), T. Irvine (Edinburgh Academicals), M. C. McEwen (Edinburgh Academicals), A. T. Clay (Edinburgh Academicals), W. M. Macleod (Wanderers), L. E. Stevenson (Edinburgh University), Clayton Simpson (Edinburgh University), C. W. Berry (Wanderers), and C. J. Milne (Wanderers), forwards.
West: F. Macindoe. back; A. E. Stephen, A. N. Woodrow, and M. F. Reid, half backs; C. P. Fraser and C. E. Orr quarter backs; W. A. Macdonald, J. French. H. Kerr, R. A. Young, D. Morton, J. G. Orr, J. G. Mitchell (captain), R. Hutcheson, and A. G. Malcolm, forwards.

=== English matches ===
No other District matches played.

=== International matches ===
No touring matches this season.
