= Tom Davis (rugby union) =

Australia international rugby union player

- Born: Thomas S. R. Davis circa 1894 Sydney

Rugby union career
- Position: prop
International career
Years	Team	Apps	(Points)
1920–1925	Wallabies	20	(6)

Thomas S. R. "Tom" Davis (born c. 1894) was a rugby union player who represented Australia.

Davis, a prop, was born in Sydney and claimed a total of 20 international rugby caps for Australia.
