= Scottish District rugby structure =

Scottish rugby union structure

- Sport: Rugby union
- Founded: 1872
- No. of teams: amateur rugby unions: Glasgow District; Edinburgh District; North; South; Midlands; de facto districts: Scottish Exiles; North and Midlands; Midlothian District Rugby; combined districts: West; East; Cities; Provinces; Combined Scottish Districts; Trial sides: Blues Trial; Whites Trial; Reds Trial; Scotland Probables; Scotland Possibles; professional district teams: Glasgow Warriors; Edinburgh Rugby; Caledonia Reds (resurrected); Border Reivers (disbanded)
- Country: Scotland

Scotland's District rugby union sides are provincial representative teams, that in the amateur era capped the best amateur players from their area's club sides to play inter-district matches and matches against touring sides. These districts still survive at amateur level playing in an amateur Inter-District Championship and age-grade. The professional teams Glasgow Warriors and Edinburgh Rugby remain provincial sides based on the traditional districts.

Players who played for their district were capped.

== Beginnings ==
The District system began in Scotland in 1872 with the world's first provincial match, the 'Inter-City'.

This was a 20-a-side match between representatives of the Glasgow and Edinburgh rugby clubs on 23 November 1872.

Glasgow District and Edinburgh District played at Burnbank Park in the west end of Glasgow. Edinburgh won the match 1 drop goal to nil.

The 'Inter-City' became the premier Inter-District match. Initially played twice a year for the first 4 seasons, it became an annual match thereafter. Only stopping due to world war or occasional severely inclement weather the Inter-City was absorbed into the Scottish Inter-District Championship in season 1953–-54.

The present Glasgow Warriors versus Edinburgh Rugby matches are a continuation of that first Inter-City match in 1872. They now play for the 1872 Cup each season.

== Rugby Unions ==
The Scottish Rugby Union was set up in 1873 as the Scottish Football Union. Scottish rugby clubs could apply for membership. District 'football' unions were also set up to develop the game at a more local level. Newly founded clubs usually applied to their District 'football' union for membership first, to become established, before being accepted into the national Scottish Football Union.

A North of Scotland District side first played in 1881 by the SRU. The North of Scotland Rugby Union, initially formed as Scottish Northern Counties Football Union, was set up in 1887.

A Midlands District side played the North of Scotland District on 17 December 1881. The Midlands District Rugby Union, initially formed as Scottish Midland Counties Football Union, was set up in 1889.

A South of Scotland District side played the North of Scotland District on 31 December 1881. By 1890, the South is noted as playing Edinburgh District in December of that year.

The Anglo-Scots were playing South by December 1898.

In 1924, the Scottish Football Union became the Scottish Rugby Union. The SRU also standardised the 5 native districts by formally changing their set-ups to Glasgow District, North of Scotland, Midlands, South of Scotland and Edinburgh District Rugby Unions.

== Combined sides ==
=== West v East ===
Although West of Scotland District and East of Scotland District occasionally played other districts, the biggest district trial match usually was the West of Scotland District versus the East of Scotland District.

Players from the various districts were split along geographical lines for the West – East match, which was used as a selection trial match for the Scotland national rugby union team. It began in the spring of 1876 and its purpose was to broaden the opportunities for selection for all players throughout Scotland, not just the Glasgow District and Edinburgh District players who already were showcased in the Inter-City match. Thus, after the West - East fixture was introduced, the Inter-City match became an annual event from 1876–77 season onwards.

However, the Scottish Rugby Union later standardised the trial matches outwith geographical districts from 1934–35 season onwards. There was usually a Blues Trial versus Whites Trial match where the possible candidates for international selection were represented; then a second final trial match where a typical Scotland Probables line-up would play the Scotland Possibles in a 'probables versus possibles' or 'Scotland versus Rest of Scotland' match. The mid 1980s saw the introduction of a Reds Trial side.

Gradually the West versus East trial match lost importance. By the onset of the Second World War it was used as a proving match for young talent. The West – East match continued up to the 1973–74 season as a junior match; but after that, the Districts took control of their own junior sides by fielding Under 23 sides.

The fixture has recently been resurrected for the Under 16 and Under 18 age grades.

=== Cities v Provinces ===
Very occasionally the Glasgow District and Edinburgh District sides would combine as a Cities District side. They would then play the 'Rest of Scotland' or a combined North-South team, usually known as the Provinces District side.

This practice although rare was usually kept for international touring sides. The combined Cities side was then just known as Glasgow - Edinburgh.

=== Scottish Districts ===
The largest combined side was the Combined Scottish Districts side. This essentially took the best players from the districts, usually to play international touring sides.

Although primarily used as a showcase match for Scotland hopefuls, the Scottish Districts side was open to all nationalities currently playing in Scotland (like the District sides themselves).

== Smaller districts ==
Various smaller representative district sides were also set up. They usually played one another and their best players were then considered for the larger district rugby unions.

The smaller districts include:-

- South-West
- West Counties
- Rest of the West

and other combined or county sides were also variously used as representative sides:-

- Ayrshire and Renfrewshire
- Highland
- Fife
- Angus and Perthshire
- Scottish Universities
- Forth Valley
- Scottish Borders
- SRU Presidents XV
- Aberdeenshire
- Inverness-shire and Ross-shire
- Midlothian Rugby

=== Other representative sides ===
The most well known of the other Scottish representative sides is the Co-Optimist Rugby Club.

== Scottish Inter-District Championship ==
The set-up of the Scottish Inter-District Championship in 1953 saw Scottish rugby coalesce around 4 main district rugby unions. Glasgow District, Edinburgh District, South and North were initially picked, with the Midlands District players entered into the North side.

Midlands District complained to the SRU and a combined team, North and Midlands, was entered in subsequent seasons.

These 4 teams became the standard District sides.

Other District matches were still played out with the Championship. Midlands still played North; and Glasgow still played Rest of the West. Gradually, however, the season's District matches settled on the 4 standard sides, although the Anglo-Scots were an increasing addition to the non-championship Inter-District matches and touring International teams were invariably entertained.

The Anglo-Scots entered the championship in 1981.

== Professionalism ==
When the Scottish Rugby Union adopted professionalism in 1996, it decided to professionalise the 4 standard district teams. Glasgow District became the Glasgow Warriors; Edinburgh District became Edinburgh Rugby; North and Midlands became Caledonia Reds; and South became the Border Reivers. The Scottish Exiles were not included in this revamp as the Scottish Inter-District Championship became a European Qualifying Tournament for the Heineken Cup.

Presently, with only Glasgow Warriors and Edinburgh Rugby remaining, Glasgow has nominally taken over the Caledonia Reds district and Edinburgh has taken over the Border Reivers district.

The 4 standard districts still survive at age grade level and the SRU still has a long-term goal of having 4 professional district sides once again in Scotland.
