= East of Scotland District (rugby union) =

Scottish district rugby union team

East of Scotland
- Full name: East of Scotland District
- Founded: 1876; 150 years ago

East of Scotland District is a select provincial amateur rugby union team that draws its players from the East of Scotland.

Founded in 1876, the East of Scotland District team - and its corresponding West of Scotland District team - was created, thus halving Scotland's representative rugby union area in two.

This was meant as an impetus to include players from beyond the original Glasgow District and Edinburgh District catchment areas.

The West of Scotland District versus the East of Scotland District became the de facto trial match for the Scotland international team.

It survives today, but only for age-grade.

Similarly, to the West of Scotland district side, having a non-associated club side West of Scotland sharing the same name, there was for a while an East of Scotland non-associated club side, sharing the East of Scotland district name, in the Midlands District League c. 1912.

== History ==
=== Formation ===
To include other players when selecting the international team, the East v West District match was introduced by the Scottish Rugby Union in the 1875-76 season.

The match was first played on 28 February 1876.

On the advent of the East v West match, the Inter-City match between Glasgow District and Edinburgh District - previously a twice annual match - was cut down to one fixture per year.

=== Trial matches ===
The East v West match was used as the premier Trial match for the Scotland international side. Although intended to increase representation from outwith Glasgow and Edinburgh, as this was the premier trial match both Glasgow and Edinburgh players were eligible for selection for their corresponding West and East sides.

Another Trial match, a Blues v Whites match was introduced in the 1877-88 season. The Blues v Whites match evolved into a 'Probables' v 'Possibles' match for Scotland selection.

The East v West match remained the premier Trial match for Scotland until the late 1920s. It was at this stage that the Blues v Whites match overtook it in importance. The introduction of the Scotland Probables versus the Scotland Possibles trial match diminished the need for the East of Scotland District versus West of Scotland District again, and it continued in the 1930s as a junior trial match. 'Junior' matches were not age-related but matches based on teams out with the Scottish Unofficial Championship.

=== Age-grade format ===
The East v West match continued in its same format till 1948. It then switched to an age-grade format and was used for selecting the best Under 23 players for Scotland.

=== Hiatus ===
When the Scottish Inter-District Championship began its own grade tournament, the East v West matches were curtailed.

=== Resurrection ===
The West of Scotland District and East of Scotland District representative sides have recently been resurrected at age-grade levels. These matches are now used as trial matches to identify candidates for the Scottish Rugby Academy and potential Glasgow Warriors, Edinburgh Rugby and Scotland stars of the future.

== Notable former players ==
=== Scotland Internationalists ===
- (Scotland) Louis Auldjo
- (Scotland) Charles Cathcart
- (Scotland) Augustus Grant-Asher
- (Scotland) Charles Berry
- (Scotland) Ewan Douglas
- (Scotland) Ninian Finlay
- (Scotland) Duncan Irvine
- (Scotland) William Masters
- (Scotland) Gardyne Maitland
- (Scotland) William Penman
- (Scotland) Bulldog Irvine
- (Scotland) Alexander Petrie
- (Scotland) Pat Smeaton
- (Scotland) James Holt Marsh
- (Scotland) William Cownie
- (Scotland) James Reid
- (Scotland) Gussie Graham
- (Scotland) David Somerville
- (Scotland) Darsie Anderson
