= 1872–73 Scottish Districts season =

Rugby union competition

- Countries: Scotland
- Date: 1872-73
- Matches played: 2

The 1872–73 Scottish Districts season is a record of all the rugby union matches for Scotland's district teams.

It includes the Inter-City fixtures between Glasgow District and Edinburgh District.

== History ==
The Glasgow District v Edinburgh District match is the first representative district match in the world.

Originally this was a twice a season fixture; and it was in this 1872-73 season.

The matches in this season were 20 - a - side.

The district matches between Glasgow and Edinburgh, as Scotland's two largest cities, were known as the Inter-City rivalry.

== Results ==
Date	Try	Conversion	Penalty	Dropped goal	Goal from mark	Notes
1871–1875	no score	1 goal	1 goal	1 goal	—N/a	

=== Inter-City ===
23 November 1872
3pm

Glasgow District	0 - 1 drop goal	Edinburgh District
	Report	Drop: Thomas Roger Marshall

Burnbank Park, Glasgow

Glasgow District:Backs: Thomas Chalmers (Glasgow Academicals), William Davie Brown (Glasgow Academicals), William Hamilton Kidston (West of Scotland)
Half backs: William Cross (Glasgow Academicals), T. A. Drew (Glasgow Academicals)
Quarter backs: George Buchanan McClure (West of Scotland), John Arthur (Glasgow Academicals) [Captain]
Forwards: John Kennedy Tod, Henry William Allan, Charles Chalmers Bryce, George Raphael Fleming, J.S. Thomson, J.K. Brown (all Glasgow Academicals)
James Howe McClure, J. Kennedy, J.P. Tennant, Robert Wilson, G. Hunter, A. Cochrane (all West of Scotland)
J.W. Reid (Glasgow University)
Edinburgh District: A. Ross (Wanderers), J. Patullo (Craigmount), Thomas Roger Marshall (Edinburgh Academicals), William St Clair Grant (Craigmount), J. Junor (Royal High School), J. A. W. Mein (Edinburgh Academicals), and E. Thew (Merchistonians), backs; Francis Moncreiff (captain), R. W. Irvine, E. M. Bannerman, James Finlay (Edinburgh Academicals), Angus Buchanan, Alexander Petrie, and M. Sanderson (Royal High School), Charles Walker Cathcart and John Lisle Hall MacFarlane (Edinburgh University), Tom Whittington (Merchistonians), Benjamin Blyth II (Merchistonians), J. Forsyth and A. R. Stewart (Wanderers), forwards.

15 February 1873
3pm

Edinburgh District	1 goal, 2 tries - 0	Glasgow District
Try: James Finlay; A. Wood; Con: John Lisle Hall McFarlane	Report

Raeburn Place, Edinburgh
Attendance: 600

Edinburgh District: G. F. Raynor (Royal HSFP), Blackwood (Edinburgh Academicals), Thomas Roger Marshall (Edinburgh Academicals), W. St. Clair Grant (Craigmount), John Lisle Hall McFarlane (Edinburgh Wanderers), J. Junor (Royal High School), J. A. W. Mein (Edinburgh Academicals), F. Penny (Edinburgh Wanderers), Francis Moncreiff (captain) (Edinburgh Academicals), Charles Walker Cathcart (Edinburgh University), Angus Buchanan (Edinburgh University), Edward Bannerman (Edinburgh Academicals), J. Forsyth (Edinburgh Wanderers), Tom Whittington (Merchistonians), R. W. Irvine (Edinburgh Academicals), Alexander Petrie (Royal High School), Benjamin Blyth II (Merchistonians), James Finlay (Edinburgh Academicals), Alexander Wood (Royal HSFP), W. K. Gair (Edinburgh Academicals)
Glasgow District:Backs: Thomas Chalmers (Glasgow Academicals), William Davie Brown (Glasgow Academicals)
Half backs:William Hamilton Kidston (West of Scotland), T. A. Drew (Glasgow Academicals)
Quarter backs: George Buchanan McClure (West of Scotland), John Arthur (Glasgow Academicals) [Captain]
Forwards: George Raphael Fleming, J.S. Thomson, J. S. Tod, J. Ritchie, W. M. Brown, A. T. Arthur, Allan Arthur (all Glasgow Academicals)
James Howe McClure, J. Kennedy, J. Bolton, T. Y. Kennedy, Robert Wilson, A. Cochrane (all West of Scotland)
C.E. Hope (Glasgow University)

=== Other Scottish matches ===
No other District matches played.

=== English matches ===
No other District matches played.

=== International matches ===
No touring matches this season.
