= 1873–74 Home Nations rugby union matches =

The 1873–74 Home Nations rugby union matches was a single international friendly held between the England and Scotland national rugby union teams. With no other recognised rugby union teams in Britain or the rest of the world, the encounter between Scotland and England represented the only possible match that could be arranged, and would continue as such until 1875, when Ireland formed a national team.

== Results ==
23 February 1874

England	1 – 0	Scotland

Kennington Oval, England

=== Scoring system ===
The matches for this season were decided on goals scored. A goal was awarded for a successful conversion after a try, for a dropped goal or for a goal from mark. If a game was drawn, any unconverted tries were tallied to give a winner. If there was still no clear winner, the match was declared a draw.

== The matches ==
=== England vs. Scotland ===
23 February 1874

England	1DG – 1T	Scotland
Drop: Freeman		Try: Finlay

Kennington Oval, London

England: John Batten (Cambridge University), Marshall Brooks (Oxford University), Harold Freeman (Marlborough Nomads), WE Collins (Old Cheltonians), Sydney Morse (Marlborough Nomads), William Henry Milton (Marlborough Nomads), Thomas Batson (Blackheath), Henry Bryden (Clapham Rovers), Ernest Cheston (Richmond), Charles Crosse (Oxford University), FL Cunliffe (RMA), JSM Genth (Manchester), Alfred St. George Hamersley (Marlborough Nomads) capt., Edward Kewley (Liverpool), Henry Lawrence (Richmond), Murray Marshall (Blackheath), S Parker (Liverpool), William FH Stafford (Royal Engineers), Dawson Turner (Richmond), Roger Walker (Manchester)

Scotland: William Davie Brown (Glasgow Academicals) capt., T Chalmers (Glasgow Academicals), HM Hamilton (West of Scotland), TR Marshall (Edinburgh Academicals), William Hamilton Kidston (West of Scotland), W St Clair Grant (Craigmount School), AK Stewart (Edinburgh University RFC), Charles Chalmers Bryce (Glasgow Academicals), John Davidson (RIE College), JF Finlay (Edinburgh Academicals), Gilbert Heron (Glasgow Academicals), RW Irvine (Edinburgh Academicals), JAW Mein (Edinburgh Academicals), Tom Paterson Neilson (West of Scotland), AG Petrie (Royal HSFP), J Reid (Edinburgh Wanderers), John Kennedy Tod (Glasgow Academicals), RW Wilson (West of Scotland), A Wood (Royal HSFP), AH Young (Edinburgh Academicals)

== Bibliography ==
- Griffiths, John (1982). The Book of English International Rugby 1872-1982. London: Willow Books. ISBN 978-0-00-218006-1.
- Griffiths, John (1987). The Phoenix Book of International Rugby Records. London: Phoenix House. ISBN 0-460-07003-7.
