= 1874–75 Scottish Districts season =

Rugby union competition

- Countries: Scotland
- Date: 1874-75
- Matches played: 2

The 1874–75 Scottish Districts season is a record of all the rugby union matches for Scotland's district teams.

It includes the Inter-City fixtures between Glasgow District and Edinburgh District.

== History ==
The matches here remain 20 – a – side. These matches, with more players on the park, made it harder to score.

In addition, scoring a try did not count for points. The try gave you an attempt to get a score by means of the conversion; if the conversion was missed then it did not benefit the try scoring team. It was only goals that mattered.

Both inter-city matches this season show just how difficult it was to score when the teams were 20-a-side.

The February 1875 match was the fourth draw in succession, although the North British Mail noted that Glasgow District had the best of the Inter-City match. It was noted that the 1875 match was played in two halves lasting 50 minutes each.

== Results ==
Date	Try	Conversion	Penalty	Dropped goal	Goal from mark	Notes
1871–1875	no score	1 goal	1 goal	1 goal	—	

=== Inter-City ===
5 December 1874

Glasgow District	0–0	Edinburgh District
	Report

Hamilton Crescent, Glasgow

Glasgow District: William Davie Brown [captain], James Stewart Carrick (both Glasgow Academicals)
Malcolm Cross (Glasgow Academicals), William Hamilton Kidston (West of Scotland)
James Howe McClure, George Buchanan McClure (both West of Scotland), John Kennedy Tod (Glasgow Academicals)
Gilbert Heron, Charles Chalmers Bryce, Allan Arthur, Henry William Allan,
George Raphael Fleming (all Glasgow Academicals), Tom Paterson Neilson, John Alexander Neilson, J.S. Kennedy, Preston (West of Scotland)
C.E. McArthur, Henry Melville Napier, W.B. Russell, J. Hutchison (Glasgow University)
Edinburgh District: W. Blackwood (Edinburgh Academicals), G. F. Raynor (Royal HSFP), N. Finlay (Edinburgh Academicals), R. Johnston (Warriston), T. Bell (Edinburgh Academicals), George Paterson (Warriston), T. L. Knott (Royal HSFP), J. Finlay (Edinburgh Academicals) [captain], R. Duncan (Edinburgh Academicals), Arthur Marshall (Edinburgh Academicals), Gussie Graham (Edinburgh Academicals), C. Hawkins (Edinburgh Wanderers), J. Reid (Edinburgh Wanderers), N. T. Brown (Institution), A. G. Petrie (Royal HSFP), A. Wood (Royal HSFP), S. McDonald (Warriston), Connell (Edinburgh University), T. Spens (Edinburgh University), C. Villar (Warriston)

20 February 1875

Edinburgh District	0–0	Glasgow District
	Report

Raeburn Place, Edinburgh

Edinburgh District: R. Johnstone (Warriston), G. F. Raynor (Royal HSFP), N. J. Finlay (Edinburgh Academicals), J. Montgomery (Edinburgh Wanderers), L. Aitken (Edinburgh Academicals), W. Connell (Edinburgh Wanderers), George Paterson (Warriston), Bulldog Irvine (Edinburgh Academicals) [captain], J. Mein (Edinburgh Academicals), R. Duncan (Edinburgh Academicals), Arthur Marshall (Edinburgh Academicals), J. G. Petrie (Royal HSFP), A. Wood (Royal HSFP), James Robertson (Royal HSFP), J. Reid (Edinburgh Wanderers), C. Hawkins (Edinburgh Wanderers), C. Villar (Warriston), Nat Brewis (Edinburgh Institution F.P.), W. Forsyth (Edinburgh University), Gussie Graham (Edinburgh Academicals)
Glasgow District: J. S. Carrick (Glasgow Academicals), T. Chalmers (Glasgow Academicals), M. Cross (Glasgow Academicals), D. M. Brunton (Glasgow University), J. K. Tod (Glasgow Academicals), J. H. McClure (West of Scotland), G. R. McClure [captain] (West of Scotland), G. Heron, Allan Arthur, G. Fleming, J.S. Tod, A. Arwell, S. Smith, H. Allen, J. H. Dunlop, F. McRae, W. S. Brown (all Glasgow Academicals), W. R. Russell, J. Cochrane (both West of Scotland), J. Hutchinson (Glasgow University)

=== Other Scottish matches ===
No other District matches played.

=== English matches ===
No other District matches played.

=== International matches ===
No touring matches this season.
