= 1871–72 Home Nations rugby union matches =

There was a single international friendly between the England and Scotland national rugby union teams in the 1871–72 season. With no other recognised rugby union teams in Great Britain or the rest of the world, the encounter between Scotland and England represented the only possible match that could be arranged, and would continue as such until 1875, when Ireland formed their national team.

== Results ==
5 February 1872

England	2–1	Scotland

Kennington Oval, England

=== Scoring system ===
Matches in this season were decided on goals scored. A goal was awarded for a successful conversion after a try, for a dropped goal or for a goal from mark. If a game was drawn, any unconverted tries were tallied to give a winner. If there was still no clear winner, the match was declared a draw.

== The match: England vs. Scotland ==
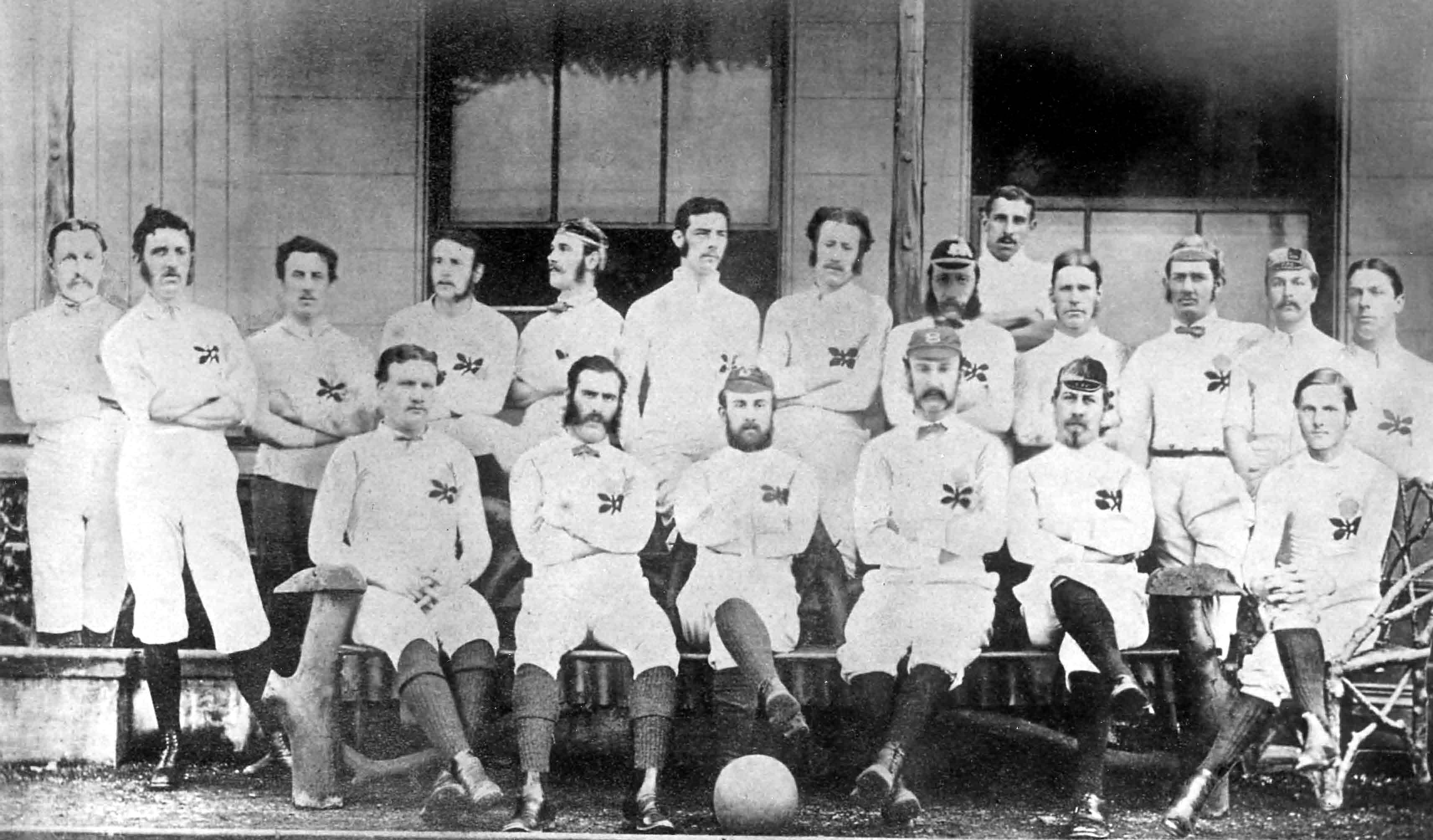
England team

5 February 1872

England	1G, 1DG, 2T – 1DG	Scotland
Try: D'Aguilar; Finney; Hamersley; Con: Isherwood; Drop: Freeman		Drop: Cathcart

Kennington Oval, London

England: A. G. Guillemard (West Kent), Frederick Mills (Marlborough Nomads), William Moberly (Ravenscourt Park), Harold Freeman (Marlborough Nomads), John Edmund Bentley (Gipsies), Stephen Finney (I.C.E. College), Percival Wilkinson (Law Club), Thomas Batson (Blackheath), James Body (Gipsies), James Bush (Clifton), Frederick Currey (Marlborough Nomads), D'Aguilar (Royal Engineers), Alfred St. George Hamersley (Marlborough Nomads), Francis Isherwood (Ravenscourt Park), Francis Luscombe (Gipsies), James Mackinlay (St George's Hospital), William Wyatt Pinching (Guy's Hospital), Charles Sherrard (Royal Engineers), Frederick Stokes (Blackheath) capt., Dawson Turner (Richmond)

Scotland: WD Brown (Glasgow Academicals), T Chalmers (Glasgow Academicals), LM Balfour (Edinburgh Academicals), TR Marshall (Edinburgh Academicals), RP Maitland (Royal Artillery), JW Arthur (Glasgow Academicals), FJ Moncreiff (Edinburgh Academicals) capt., William Cross (Merchistonians), J Anderson (West of Scotland), EM Bannerman (Edinburgh Academicals), CW Cathcart (Edinburgh University), Andrew Galbraith Colville (Merchistonians), JF Finlay (Edinburgh Academicals), RW Irvine (Edinburgh Academicals), W Marshall (Edinburgh Academicals), JLH MacFarlane (Edinburgh University), JH McClure (West of Scotland), FT Maxwell (Royal Engineers), JAW Mein (Edinburgh Academicals), Henry Renny-Tailyour (Royal Engineers)

== Bibliography ==
- Griffiths, John (1982). The Book of English International Rugby 1872-1982. London: Willow Books. ISBN 978-0-00-218006-1.
- Griffiths, John (1987). The Phoenix Book of International Rugby Records. London: Phoenix House. ISBN 0-460-07003-7.
