= D'Aguilar =

D'Aguilar may refer to:

== People ==
- Baron Diego Pereira D' Aguilar, Portuguese nobleman and Marrano.
- Ephraim Lópes Pereira d'Aguilar, 2nd Baron d'Aguilar
- Francis d'Aguilar, British rugby union international player
- George Charles D'Aguilar, British Army officer and Lieutenant-governor of Hong Kong
- Joseph d'Aguilar Samuda, British engineer and politician
- Martin d'Aguilar, Spanish explorer
- Dionisio D'Aguilar, well known Bahamian businessman and former President of the Bahamas Chamber of Commerce

== Places ==
- D'Aguilar, Queensland, a rural town in Queensland, Australia
- D'Aguilar Range, a mountain range northwest of Brisbane, Australia
- D'Aguilar National Park, a National Park in Queensland, based on the D'Aguilar Range
- Cape D'Aguilar, a peninsula in Hong Kong
- D'Aguilar Street, a street in Hong Kong
- Château d'Aguilar, a castle in France

== Roads ==
- The D'Aguilar Highway, a highway in southeast Queensland
