= Moondla =

Moondla may refer to:

- Moondla, Huzur, a village in Madhya Pradesh, India
- Moondla, Jamwa Ramgarh, is a village in Rajasthan, India

== See also ==
- Moondla Chattan, a village in Madhya Pradesh, India
- Mundla Chand, a village in Madhya Pradesh, India
- Mundlamuru
- Mundlapadu
- Moondla Bisoti, a village in the Atru tehsil in Baran district, Rajasthan, India
