= George Thomas d'Aguilar =

British Army officer (b. 1783, d. 1839)

- Born: 1783
- Died: 1839 (aged 55–56)
- Military career
- Allegiance: Great Britain
- Branch: British Army
- Rank: Lieutenant Colonel

Lieutenant Colonel George Thomas d'Aguilar (11 August 1783 – 9 October 1839) was a British Army officer.

== Family ==
D'Aguilar was born in Oxford, to Benjamin d'Aguilar and Jane d'Aguilar, D'Aguilar received the Christian Anglican baptism in May 1784. He was a descendant of Baron Diego Pereira d'Aguilar and cousin of George Charles D'Aguilar. He married with Catherine Burton and they had 8 children, including the Rev. John Burton D'Aguilar, Vicar of Ashwick. His wife Catherine was the aunt of the explorer Sir Richard Francis Burton.

== Military career ==
D'Aguilar traveled to Calcutta on 14 November 1790 and entered the first Battalion of the 13th Regiment of Foot in Varanasi. Having secured a commission on the establishment of the honorable service of the East India Company, D'Aguilar traveled to Madras and was sent to the 13th Native Infantry of Madras. In August 1798 he was commissioned by the H.M.S 78th. He was promoted to the post of Lieutenant on 29 May 1800 in Gorakhpur. In 1802 he became a volunteer to participate in the French campaign in Egyptian Expedition, but was not accepted. He served in the battalion's advance with Colonel Philpot's brigade, and subsequently in Sir Dyson Marshal's division, he commanded 5 companies at Mundla in 23 to 27 April 1818, and under the personal direction of Gen. J. Watson, in HMS 14th regiment he was allowed to join the 1st battalion 13th regiment. In August 1818 he went to Ceylon and then to Barrackpore with some volunteers, but the conflicts in those places were repressed and he returned his corps at Aligarh.

He was grandfather of Francis d'Aguilar. He died in 1839 in Calcutta.
