= Alexander Wood (rugby union) =

Scottish rugby union player (1848–1905)

- Born: Alexander Thomson Wood; 30 April 1848 Kirktown of Fetteresso, Aberdeenshire, Scotland
- Died: 26 October 1905 (aged 57) Stonehaven, Scotland

Rugby union career
- Position: Forward
Amateur team(s)
| Years | Team | Apps | (Points) |
- Royal HSFP
Provincial / State sides
| Years | Team | Apps | (Points) |
| 1873-75 | Edinburgh District | 3 | (0) |
International career
| Years | Team | Apps | (Points) |
| 1873-75 | Scotland | 3 | (0) |

Alexander Wood (30 April 1848 – 26 October 1905) was a Scotland international rugby union player who represented Scotland from 1873 to 1875.

== Rugby Union career ==
=== Amateur career ===
Wood played for Royal HSFP.

=== Provincial career ===
Wood represented Edinburgh District against Glasgow District in the world's second provincial match, the 'inter-city', on 15 February 1873.

Wood next played for the District on 5 December 1874 and 20 February 1875.

=== International career ===
Wood's international debut was the home match against England on 3 March 1873 at Glasgow.

Wood played again for Scotland, against England, in the following year's fixture at The Oval on 23 February 1874.

Wood's last match for Scotland, again against England, was the fixture at Raeburn Place, Edinburgh on 8 March 1875.
