= Francis Mitchell Caird =

Scottish surgeon (1853–1926)

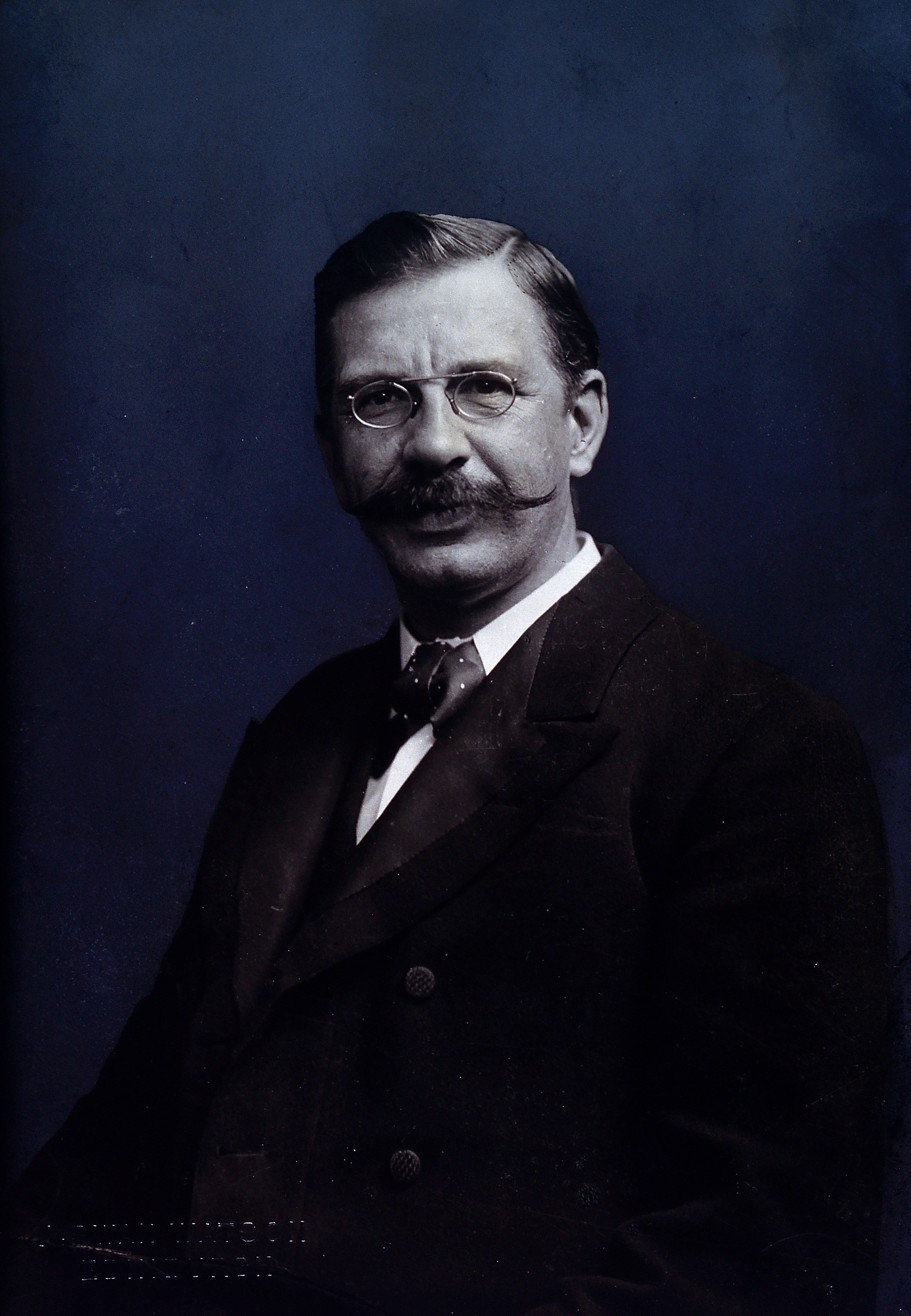
Francis Mitchell Caird. Photograph by A. Swan Watson. Wellcome V0026152

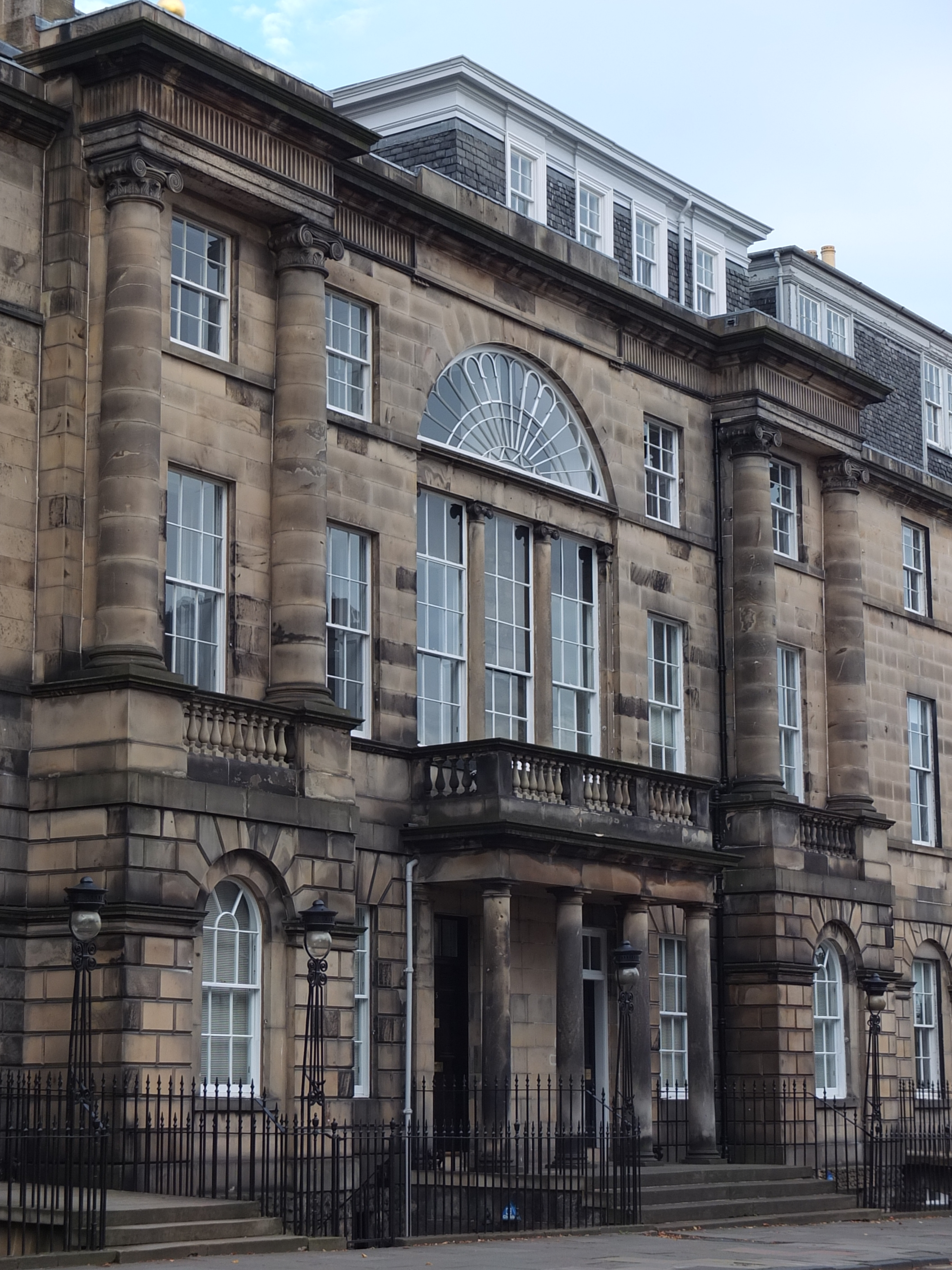
13-14 CHARLOTTE SQUARE

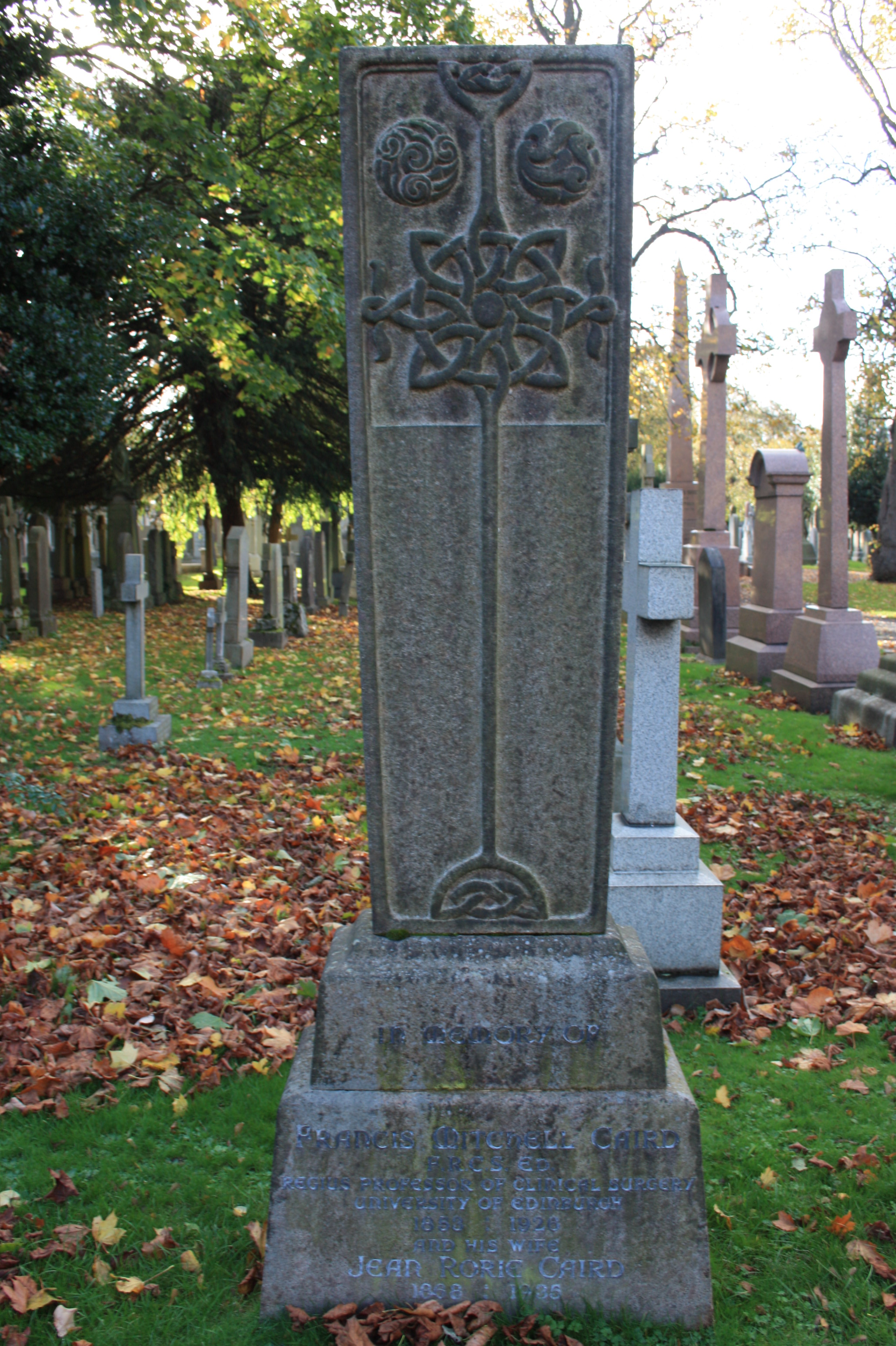
The grave of Prof Francis Mitchell Caird, Dean Cemetery, Edinburgh

Francis Mitchell Caird FRCSEd (8 August 1853 – 2 November 1926) was a Scottish surgeon who was an early advocate of Listerian antisepsis and then asepsis. He was a pioneer of gastrointestinal surgery. From 1908 to 1919 he was Regius Professor of Clinical Surgery at the University of Edinburgh and was President of the Royal College of Surgeons of Edinburgh from 1912 to 1914.

== Early life and education ==
He was born on 8 August 1853 in Edinburgh in 1853 the son of Margaret (née Dickson) and Francis Garden Caird who lived at 22 Gayfield Square at the top of Leith Walk. Caird was educated at the Royal High School, where he received a medal for botany. Botany was to remain a lifelong interest and on leaving school he became apprentice to a seed merchant. John Hutton Balfour, who had been his examiner for the school botany medal suggested to his parents that he should have a university education. After serving as Balfour's assistant in the Botany Department of the University of Edinburgh he went on to matriculate as a medical undergraduate at the university. His lecturers there included eminent surgeons including Joseph Lister and Thomas Annandale. He is not thought to be a close relative of the surgeon John Caird of 21 St Patrick Square.

While an undergraduate he served as a dresser on Joseph Lister's' wards at the Edinburgh Royal Infirmary This experience was to have a major influence on his future career and life's work. He became an early disciple of Listerian antisepsis and was to practice and promote this throughout his working life. He would later promote the techniques of aseptic surgery as these emerged as superior. He graduated MB CM from the University of Edinburgh in 1877.

== Surgical career ==
After a resident post in the Edinburgh Royal Infirmary under Mr. John Chiene, he was elected to the Fellowship of the Royal College of Surgeons of Edinburgh in 1880. He then made the first of what became a series of regular visits to surgical centres in Europe, studying under the leading German pathologist Friedrich von Recklinghausen in Strasbourg. After demonstrating in anatomy for three years in the Edinburgh Extramural School of Medicine, at Surgeons' Hall under C W Cathcart and at Minto House, he became assistant surgeon to The Royal Infirmary in 1886. Over the next twenty years he continued to lecture in the extramural medical school.

He was appointed surgeon to the Royal Infirmary in 1903. In 1908 he succeeded Professor Thomas Annandale as Professor of Clinical Surgery at the University of Edinburgh, a position previously held by his mentor Joseph Lister. During World War I he was consulting surgeon to the British Expeditionary Force in France, as a colonel in the Army Medical Service attached to the Third Army. Together with his lifelong friend and colleague C W Cathcart, he wrote A Surgical Handbook for the Use of Students, Practitioners, etc, which was illustrated with many of his own drawings.

== Pioneer of gastrointestinal surgery ==
His use of rigorous aseptic technique and visits to continental surgeons like Jan Mikulicz-Radeckin at what was then the University of Breslau and Theodor Billroth in Vienna allowed him to successfully pioneer intestinal surgery in Scotland. He was one of the first to perform major gastrointestinal resections in Scotland. The operations he performed included excision of the tongue for carcinoma, closure of perforated gastric and duodenal ulcers, excision of the small bowel for tuberculous stricture, partial colectomy for colonic stricture and excision of the rectum for carcinoma, the latter procedure often performed under spinal anaesthesia.

== Honours and awards ==
In 1889 Caird was elected a member of the Harveian Society of Edinburgh and served as president in 1919. He was awarded the Liston Victoria Jubilee Prize by the RCSEd in 1901 "for the greatest benefit done to practical surgery by any Fellow or Licentiate of the College" in the preceding four years. In 1910 he was elected a member of the Aesculapian Club. In 1912 he succeeded George Andreas Berry as President of the Royal College of Surgeons of Edinburgh. He was succeeded in turn by James Hodsdon.

Caird received the honorary degree of LL.D. from the University of Edinburgh in 1920. His knowledge of and enthusiasm for botany stayed with him throughout his life and he became President of the Botanical Society.

== Family and later life ==
He was married to Jean Rorie Caird (1868–1935). Their son Karl Francis Caird was a general practitioner. His grandson, Francis Irvine Caird, was Professor of Geriatric Medicine at the University of Glasgow.

In later life he lived at 13 Charlotte Square in Edinburgh's New Town in a house which had originally been the home of Sir William Fettes. On retiral he moved from Charlotte Square to Royal Terrace on Calton Hill.

Caird retired in 1918 due to ill-health and was succeeded in the Regius Chair by Sir Harold Stiles.

He died in Edinburgh on 2 November 1926 and is buried with his wife in the first northern extension to Dean Cemetery in western Edinburgh. The grave lies on a north–south path towards the east.

== Publications ==
- Hints on Antiseptic Management of Wounds
- A Surgical Handbook for the Use of Students (1903 and multiple later editions)

He was a regular contributor to the British Journal of Surgery.
