= Albert Harvey =

Scottish rugby union player and textile merchant

- Born: Albert Harvey; 23 July 1843 Renfrew, Scotland
- Died: 24 December 1912 (aged 69) Prestwick, Scotland

Rugby union career
- Position: Forward
Amateur team(s)
Years	Team	Apps	(Points)
1869-	Glasgow Academicals		

2nd President of the Scottish Rugby Union
- In office 1874–1875
- Preceded by: John Chiene
- Succeeded by: Benjamin Blyth II

Albert Harvey (23 July 1843 – 24 December 1912) was a Scottish rugby union player, and later a textile merchant. He was a founder of the Scottish Rugby Union and its second President.

== Rugby Union career ==
=== Amateur career ===
Harvey played for Glasgow Academicals from the 1869–70 season.

In 1870, he was part of the Glasgow Academicals side which went to England to play Liverpool and Manchester.

=== Administrative career ===
Harvey and the Glasgow Academicals captain, John Arthur, were on the committee that formed the Scottish Rugby Union in 1873, which was originally known as the Scottish Football Union. He was President of the SRU from 1874 to 1875.

== Textile career ==
Harvey had a career in textiles and was in the Incorporation of Weavers in Glasgow. He was a Director of the Borneo Company in London and the Northern Assurance Company in Glasgow.

Days before his death on 24 December 1912 he was named as a Trustee in the West of Scotland American Investment Company. It was seeking more debenture capital from the public in an advert in The Scotsman newspaper.

== Death ==
Harvey died suddenly while playing golf at Prestwick on 24 December 1912. The value of his estate was a sizeable £27251, 2 shillings and 2d.

== Outside of rugby ==
Harvey remained closely connected with The Glasgow Academy. He was a judge at their Sports day in 1870. He was a Steward at their Sports Day in 1888. Attending the Academy was a family tradition among his sons and nephews.

He was also an enthusiastic sportsman. Harvey golfed and fished.
