= Robert Wilson (rugby union, born 1854) =

Scottish rugby union player (1854–1911)

- Born: Robert Walter Wilson; 4 February 1854 Scotland
- Died: 6 July 1911 (aged 57)

Rugby union career
- Position: Forward
Amateur team(s)
Years	Team	Apps	(Points)
- West of Scotland
Provincial / State sides
Years	Team	Apps	(Points)
1872-74	Glasgow District	3	(0)
International career
Years	Team	Apps	(Points)
1873-74	Scotland	2	(0)

Robert Wilson (4 February 1854 – 6 July 1911) was a Scotland international rugby union player who represented Scotland in 1873 and 1874.

== Rugby Union career ==
=== Amateur career ===
Wilson played for West of Scotland.

=== Provincial career ===
He represented Glasgow District against Edinburgh District in the world's first provincial match, the 'inter-city', on 23 November 1872.

=== International career ===
His international debut was the home match against England on 3 March 1873 at Glasgow.

He played again for Scotland, against England, in the following year's fixture at The Oval on 23 February 1874.
