= Tom Whittington =

Welsh cricketer (1881–1944)

Personal information
- Full name: Thomas Aubrey Leyson Whittington
- Born: 29 July 1881; Neath, Glamorgan, Wales
- Died: 19 July 1944 (aged 62); St Pancras, London, England
- Batting: Right-handed
- Role: Occasional wicket-keeper
- Relatives: Tom Whittington (rugby union), father

Domestic team information
- Years: Team
- 1923: Wales
- 1912: Minor Counties
- 1910/11–1913: Marylebone Cricket Club
- 1901–1923: Glamorgan

Career statistics
Competition	First-class
Matches	70
Runs scored	2,303
Batting average	19.28
100s/50s	2/10
Top score	154
Balls bowled	5
Wickets	–
Bowling average	–
5 wickets in innings	–
10 wickets in match	–
Best bowling	–
Catches/stumpings	23/–
- Source: Cricinfo, 28 August 2011

Thomas Aubrey Leyson Whittington (29 July 1881 – 19 July 1944) was a Welsh cricketer. Whittington was a right-handed batsman who fielded occasionally as a wicket-keeper. He was born in Neath, Glamorgan. In a career which lasted 22 years, Whittington was to prove a crucial figure in the history of Glamorgan County Cricket Club, with his influence within the MCC gaining them elevation from a Minor county to a first-class county and entry to the County Championship, a position they retain to this day.

== Early career ==
Whittington made his debut Glamorgan in the 1901 Minor Counties Championship against Devon. After studying law at Oxford University, he secured a regular place in the Glamorgan team. Over the next decade he made 70 Minor Counties Championship appearances for the county, as well as securing the captaincy in 1908 after succeeding Joseph Brain, while the following year he became the county secretary. He hit career best 188 against Carmarthenshire in 1908, with further consistent performances earning him a call up to the West of England for their match against the East of England, a match which saw him make his first-class debut. His performances also earned him a call up to the Marylebone Cricket Club squad to tour the West Indies in 1910/11. He made eleven first-class appearances on the tour against Barbados, British Guiana, Trinidad, Jamaica and the West Indies themselves. The tour was fairly successful for Whittington, with him scoring 678 runs at an average of 37.66 and a high score of 154. He made two centuries and two fifties on the tour. In 1912 he was selected to play a first-class match each for South Wales and the Minor Counties, both against the touring South Africans. He later toured the West Indies again with the MCC in 1912/1913, making six first-class appearances on the tour, in the process scoring 252 runs with three half centuries, and a high score of 62. In the 1913 English season, Whittington played two first-class matches for the MCC, one each against Kent and Hampshire.

== Later career ==
Following the war, Whittington used his influence in South Wales to raise financial support for Glamorgan, as well as lobbying the MCC hierarchy to elevate Glamorgan to first-class status. The MCC agreed to do so, so long as the county was able to secure home and away fixtures with eight over first-class opponents in 1921. By the middle of 1920 he had secured sufficient fixtures for Glamorgan for the following season, which secured their entry into the 1921 County Championship. He played in Glamorgan's debut first-class appearance against Sussex at Cardiff Arms Park, which Glamorgan won by 23 runs. He was vice-captain in 1921, but secured the captaincy once more for the 1922 season, successing Norman Riches, he continued in this role for the 1923 season. His form dropped away in 1923, with his 380 runs that season coming at an average of 14.61. This led to him retiring from the first-class game at the end of that season, having made 46 first-class appearances for Glamorgan. In total, he scored 1,152 runs at an average of 14.58, with a high score of 60. The 1923 season also saw Whittington play his only first-class match for Wales against Scotland at Perth.

In honour of his services to Glamorgan cricket, the county made him their first-ever life member. Whittington took up a teaching position in Sussex in 1924, but later became a solicitor. He died in St Pancras, London on 19 July 1944.

Sporting positions
Preceded by Joseph Brain	Glamorgan cricket captain 1908–1920	Succeeded by Norman Riches
Preceded by Norman Riches	Glamorgan cricket captain 1922–1924	Succeeded by Johnnie Clay
