= Charles Walker Cathcart =

Scottish surgeon and rugby union player

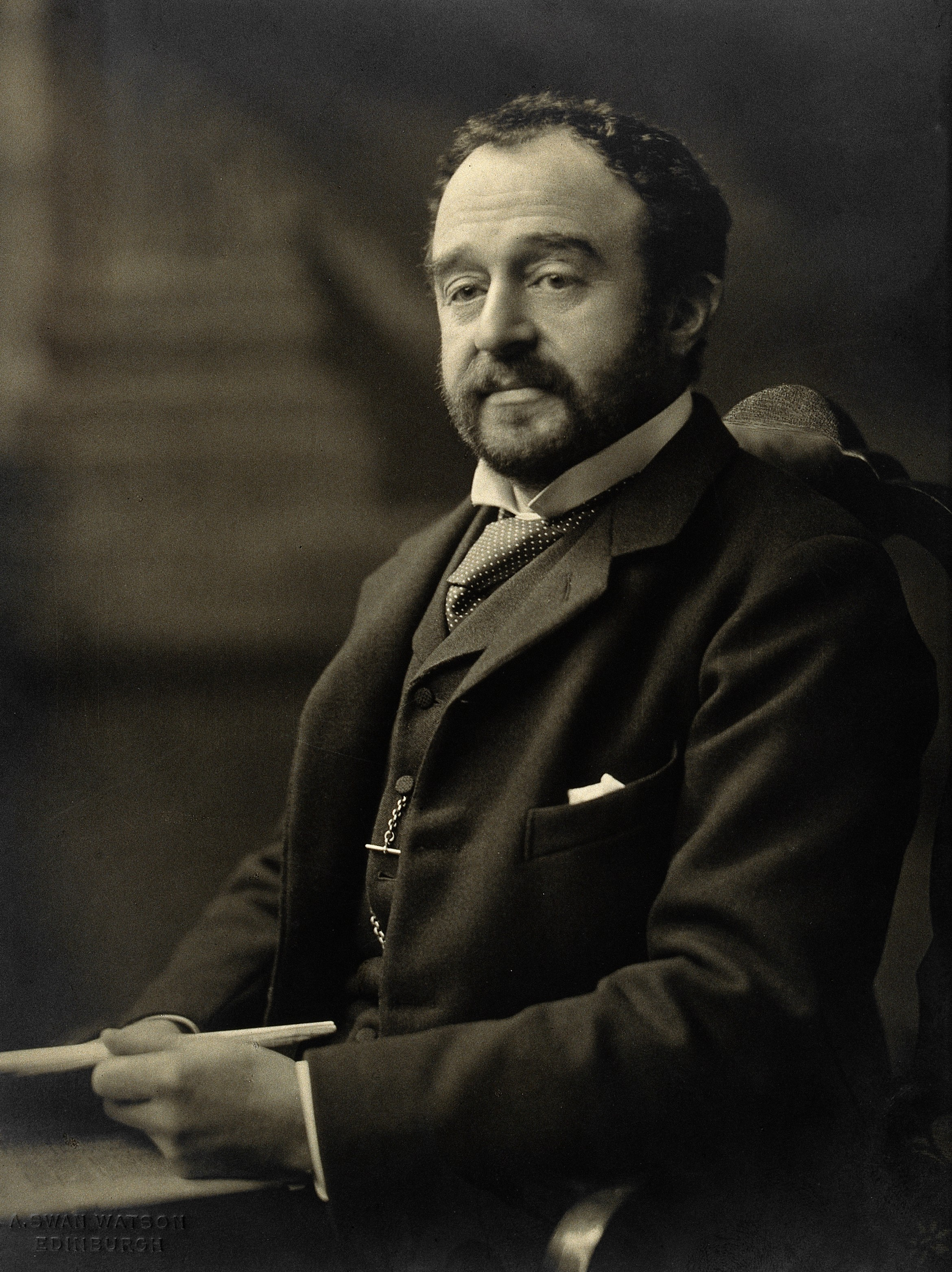
- Born: 16 March 1853; Edinburgh, Scotland
- Died: 22 February 1932 (aged 78); Edinburgh, Scotland
- Education: Loretto School; University of Edinburgh
- Occupation: Surgeon
- Medical career
- Institutions: Surgeons' Hall Museum; Royal Infirmary of Edinburgh
- Notable works: A Surgical Handbook

Rugby union career
- Position: Forward
Amateur team(s)
| Years | Team | Apps | (Points) |
| - | Edinburgh University | | |
Provincial / State sides
| Years | Team | Apps | (Points) |
| 1872- | Edinburgh District | | |
| 1876 | East of Scotland District | | |
International career
| Years | Team | Apps | (Points) |
| 1872-76 | Scotland | 3 | |

Charles Walker Cathcart, CBE CM FRCS FRCSE (16 March 1853 – 22 February 1932) was a Scottish surgeon who worked for most of his career at the Royal Infirmary of Edinburgh (RIE). As a young man he had represented Scotland at rugby on three occasions. During the First World War he jointly published an account of the value of sphagnum moss as a wound dressing which led to its widespread use by the British Army for that purpose.

As conservator of the museum of the Royal College of Surgeons of Edinburgh (RCSEd), he enlarged the museum accommodation, expanded the museum collection with the addition of over 1,300 new specimens and a large collection of histological slides. His creation of the first comprehensive catalogue of the museum collection greatly enhanced its value as a teaching and research resource. His textbook A Surgical Handbook, written jointly with Francis Caird and first published in 1889, became a best seller running to 19 editions by 1921.

== Early life ==
Charles Walker Cathcart was born in Edinburgh on 16 March 1853, the son of James Cathcart, a Leith wine merchant and his wife Helen (née Weir). He attended Loretto School, Musselburgh, where he was captain of the school rugby team. From school he went on to take an arts course at the University of Edinburgh, which included classes in logic and philosophy and he graduated MA in 1873. Cathcart then entered the university medical school and graduated MB CM in 1878. As an undergraduate he represented the university at rugby and in athletics at Scottish Inter-University sports competitions.

== Rugby Union career ==
=== Amateur career ===
Cathcart played rugby for the University of Edinburgh.

=== Provincial career ===
Cathcart represented Edinburgh District and played in the world's first non-international representative match in December 1872; the "inter-city", the inter-district match between Edinburgh District and Glasgow District.

Cathcart also played for East of Scotland in 1876.

=== International career ===
He was capped three times for Scotland, his debut coming in the second international match in 1872 when Scotland played England at The Oval, London. His only score in international rugby was a drop goal against England.

== Surgical career ==
Cathcart was house surgeon in the Royal Infirmary of Edinburgh (RIE) under Professor Thomas Annandale. Showing an early interest in a career in surgery he passed the examinations to become a Fellow of the Royal College of Surgeons of Edinburgh (FRCSEd) in 1879 and Fellow of the Royal College of Surgeons of England (FRCSE) the following year. He went on to become a lecturer in anatomy and then a lecturer in surgery in the Edinburgh Extramural School of Medicine at Surgeons' Hall. His surgical career progressed when he became assistant surgeon in the RIE in 1884, advancing to Surgeon-in-ordinary in 1901. During the First World War he became Extra Surgeon before retiring in 1918 and becoming Consulting Surgeon.

The Liston Victoria jubilee prize was awarded to him by the RCSEd in 1893.

In 1908 Cathcart joined the newly established Territorial Force, forerunner of the Territorial Army, with the rank of lieutenant-colonel. He served in the surgical unit of 2nd Scottish General Hospital at Craigleith (later the Western General Hospital), going on to become chief surgeon at the Bangour military hospital in West Lothian. In 1919 he became surgeon to Edenhall Hospital, Musselburgh which had been established as a specialist hospital to care for servicemen who had lost limbs. Cathcart was gazetted CBE (military) for his wartime service.

Cathcart had a flair for mechanical design. He designed a microtome for frozen section, a technique which had only recently been introduced into surgical practice. Aseptic surgical technique was at an early stage of development when he designed and built a steriliser for surgical dressings. This had the dual advantages of being cheap to produce and easy to work. He adapted a version of the Sprengel vacuum pump so that it could be used safely for bladder drainage.

A popular teacher he distilled much of his surgical teaching into his Surgical Handbook For the Use of Students, Practitioners, House- Surgeons, and Dressers, which he wrote jointly with Professor Francis Caird. This became popular because it contained much practical advice and guidance and the single volume was small enough to fit into a coat pocket. The book went through 19 editions between 1889 and 1921. In later life, he produced jointly with his colleague J. N. Jackson Hartley an expanded and updated version of the original entitled Requisites and methods in surgery.

=== Sphagnum moss in surgery ===
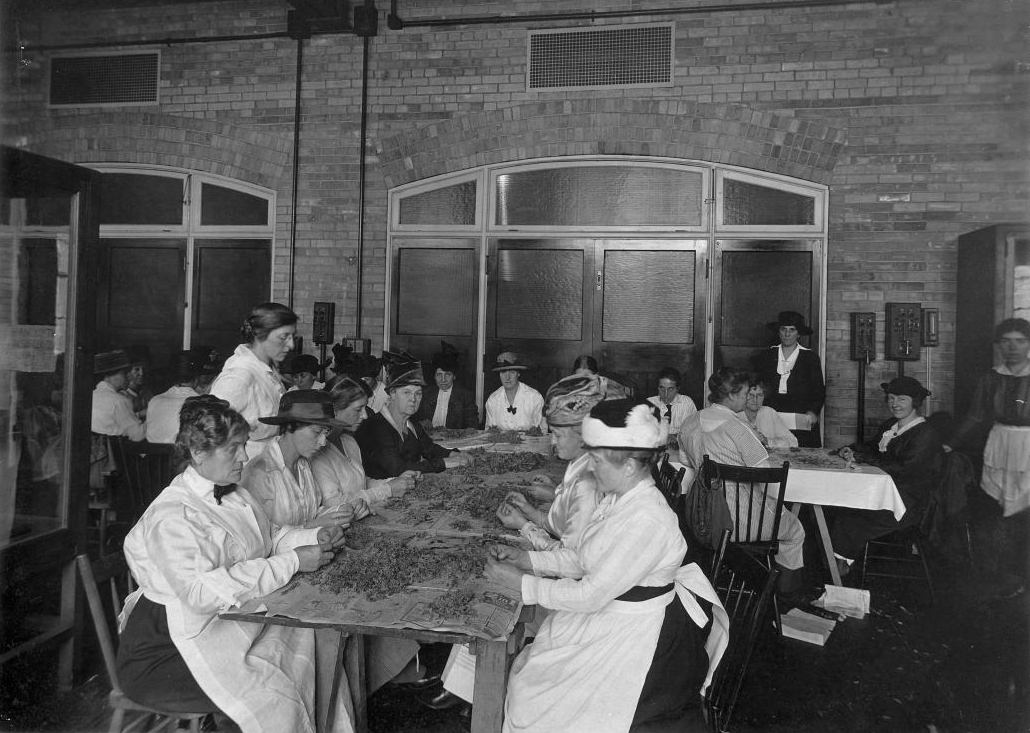
Sphagnum moss wound dressings being made at the University of Toronto c. 1914

Sphagnum moss had been used as a wound dressing by German practitioners since the 1880s, but had not been used to any extent in Britain. It is known to have absorbent properties and antiseptic properties as it creates an acidic environment in wounds which inhibits bacterial growth. In 1914 Cathcart and his friend Professor Isaac Bayley Balfour, Regius Keeper of the Royal Botanic Garden, Edinburgh (RBGEd) wrote an article for The Scotsman. In this they described how the moss could absorb and hold 20 times its own weight of water, and, as this could equally apply to lymph, wound exudate, blood or pus, they suggested its use as a wound dressing. It was more absorbent than the standard cotton wool dressing and at the time cotton wool was becoming more difficult to obtain as supplies were being used in the manufacture of gun cotton for explosives. Moreover, they argued, cotton wool had to be imported, at considerable expense and risk, while the moss was widely available in the colder, wetter areas of the British Isles and was free. They pointed out it had been shown in Germany to have antiseptic properties and to promote wound healing. Aware of the irony in copying an idea from an enemy country, they wrote, quoting Ovid: "Fas est et ab hoste doceri"—it is right to be taught even by the enemy.

Cathcart subsequently published an account in the British Medical Journal and asked the War Office for permission for its general use as a wound dressing. The War Office Medical Department agreed to this request in February 1916. Cathcart then set up a local arrangement in Edinburgh for the collection and drying of the moss and its packaging as dressings. A similar enterprise was set up in Dublin, in England and then in the United States when it joined the war, most using Cathcart's model as an exemplar. In 1916 the London Graphic reported that "the collecting, drying and making into surgical dressings of Sphagnum moss has become a national industry in Scotland ... the work is being extended all over Ireland, England and Wales." It was estimated that by 1918, around one million moss dressings each month were being sent to the Western Front and more distant theatres of war.

== Museum conservator ==
Cathcart's appointment as conservator of Surgeons' Hall Museum in 1887 marked the start of a period of regeneration for the museum. Finding that the catalogue was decades out of date he created a new catalogue using modern terminology and arranged the layout of the specimens to correspond to this, greatly increasing the value of the collection as an educational resource. He introduced some 1300 specimens into the collection in addition to a large collection of histopathology slides. In several of the older museum specimens the diagnosis was in doubt, so he also took samples from these and made slides using the microtome whose design he would later improve as the 'Cathcart microtome'. Using his expertise in interpreting such slides and with the help of pathologists, he was able to confirm or refute earlier diagnoses. He was responsible for the expansion of the museum accommodation which took place in stages between 1894 and 1908. Although he resigned as conservator in 1900, he became chairman of the museum curators and continued to influence the development which he had started.

== Family and later life ==
In 1885 Cathcart married Mary Guthrie Tait (1857–1946) and they had three daughters and a son. Their son Francis John Cathcart (b. 1894) was killed in action in the Mesopotamian campaign in the First World War on 9 June 1916 serving in the Royal Field Artillery. In memory of his son, Cathcart arranged for a play area to be built for the children of the Cowgate and Grassmarket at the Cowgate mission of the Edinburgh Medical Missionary Society which he actively supported. Cathcart died on 22 February 1932.
