= Arthur Marshall (rugby union) =

Scotland international rugby union player

- Born: Arthur Marshall; 27 April 1855 Edinburgh, Scotland
- Died: 9 December 1909 (aged 54) Chislehurst, Bromley, England

Rugby union career
- Position: Forward
Amateur team(s)
| Years | Team | Apps | (Points) |
- Edinburgh Academicals
Provincial / State sides
| Years | Team | Apps | (Points) |
| 1874- | Edinburgh District | | |
International career
| Years | Team | Apps | (Points) |
| 1875 | Scotland | 1 | (0) |

Arthur Marshall was a Scotland international rugby football player.

== Rugby Union career ==
=== Amateur career ===
Marshall played for Edinburgh Academicals.

=== Provincial career ===
Marshall played for Edinburgh District in the 1874–75 season and the 1875–76 season.

=== International career ===
He was capped once for Scotland on 8 March 1875.

== Family ==
Marshall was the son of David Captain Marshall and Christina Thomson Morgan. Arthur was one of their seven children.

It was noted that Marshall died in Erpingham, Chislehurst in the borough of Bromley on the 9 December 1909, following an operation.
