= Foster Cunliffe (rugby union) =

England international rugby union player

Foster Cunliffe (1854–1927 (aged 72–73) ) was a rugby union international forward who represented England in one match against Scotland on 23 February 1874.

Cunliffe was born on 20 April 1854 and educated at Rugby School. He was gazetted into the Royal Artillery in 1873 and served in the Second Anglo-Afghan War. He was promoted to captain in 1883, Major in 1890 and lieutenant colonel in 1899. He died on 18 April 1927.
