= William St Clair Grant (cricketer) =

Scottish rugby union player

William St Clair Grant Jnr. (8 September 1894 – 26 September 1918) was the son of a Scottish international rugby player, born in Bhaugulpore, Bengal, India.

== Cricket career ==
Grant also played first-class cricket for Gloucestershire County Cricket Club.

== Military career ==
He served in World War I and died of his wounds in a field hospital near Passchendaele, Belgium at the age of 24. He was a captain in the Cameroon Highlanders. He had just been awarded the Military Cross and the Croix de Guerre Belge.

== Family ==
His father - also named William St Clair Grant - was capped twice for Scotland against England in 1873–1874. His father also played for Craigmount RFC.

He appears to be the son of the second wife of the rugby international - Camille Grant (née Sciortino) - who William St Clair Grant had married at Bhaugulpore on 30 April 1892. The William St Clair Grant (the rugby cap) had previously married Wilhelmina Henrietta Clair Smith at Bhaugulpore on 7 January 1881 but she died there in 1884. William Sr died at Bhaugulpore 17 February 1896 aged 42 having been capped when he was only 19.

== Notes ==
- Bath, Richard (ed.) The Scotland Rugby Miscellany (Vision Sports Publishing Ltd, 2007 ISBN 1-905326-24-6)
- Massie, Allan A Portrait of Scottish Rugby (Polygon, Edinburgh; ISBN 0-904919-84-6)
