= Benjamin Blyth II =

- Born: Benjamin Hall Blyth; 25 May 1849 Edinburgh, Scotland
- Died: 13 May 1917 (aged 67) North Berwick, East Lothian, Scotland
- School: Merchiston Castle School
- University: University of Edinburgh
- Notable relative(s): Benjamin Hall Blyth I Mary Dudgeon Wright (parents)

Rugby union career
- Position: Forward
Amateur team(s)
Years	Team	Apps	(Points)
- Merchistonians
Provincial / State sides
Years	Team	Apps	(Points)
1872-73	Edinburgh District	2	(0)

3rd President of the Scottish Rugby Union
- In office 1875–1876
- Preceded by: Albert Harvey
- Succeeded by: William Hamilton Kidston
- Engineering career
- Discipline: Civil
- Institutions: Institution of Civil Engineers (president), Royal Society of Edinburgh (fellow)
- Practice name: Blyth and Blyth

Benjamin Hall Blyth FRSE (25 May 1849 – 13 May 1917), often called Benjamin Blyth II, was a Scottish civil engineer.

== Family ==
Blyth, who was born at 36 Minto Street, Edinburgh, was the eldest of the nine children of Mary Dudgeon Wright and the railway engineer Benjamin Blyth. He was educated at Merchiston Castle School between 1860 and 1864 before studying for a Master of Arts degree from the University of Edinburgh, graduating in 1867.

After the death of both parents – Benjamin Blyth in 1866 and Mary Dudgeon Wright in 1868 – Blyth and his siblings were brought up by their mother's sister, Elizabeth Scotland Wright.

== Rugby Union career ==
=== Amateur career ===
Blyth played for Merchistonians.

=== Provincial career ===
Blyth played in the world's very first representative provincial match in November 1872. This was the 'Inter-City': the match between Glasgow District and Edinburgh District. Blyth represented the Edinburgh side.

=== Administrative career ===
He became the 3rd President of the Scottish Rugby Union, holding the post between 1875 and 1876.

== Engineering career ==
Following his father's death, Blyth entered the family engineering consultancy and became a partner five years later. Blyth served as a consultant to the North British Railway and the Great North of Scotland Railway and served in an advisory capacity to the British Army with the rank of Lieutenant-Colonel in the Engineer and Railway Staff Corps. In 1872, he married Millicent Taylor with whom he had a son, Benjamin Edward, who died in infancy, and a daughter, Elsie Winifred. He became a member of the Institution of Civil Engineers in 1877, being elected to its council in 1900. He served as vice-president in 1911 and in 1914 became the first practising Scottish engineer to serve as president. On 7 February 1898 he became a Fellow of the Royal Society of Edinburgh.

== Political career ==
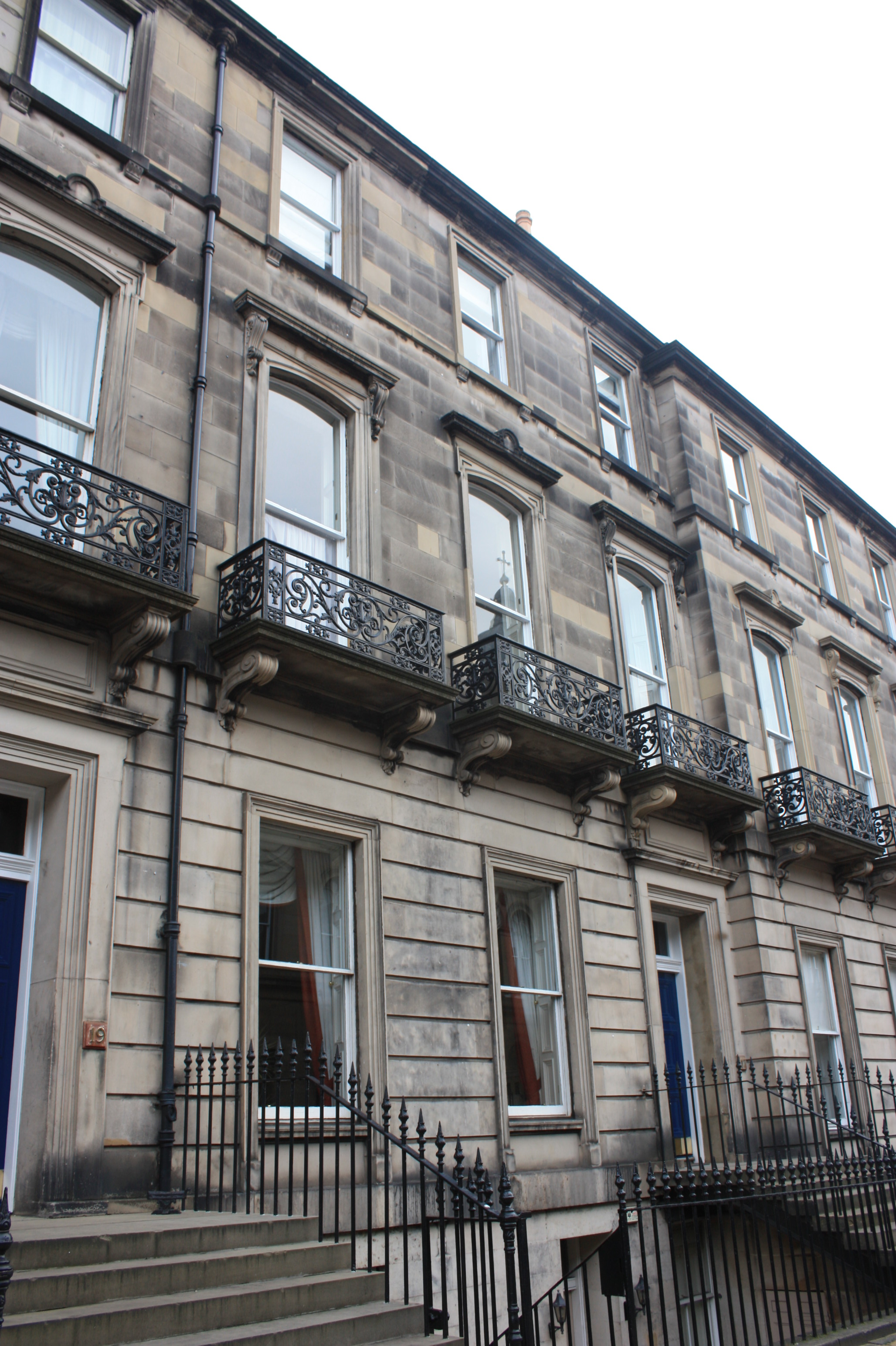
Blyth's house at 17 Palmerston Place, Edinburgh

In later life, Blyth lived in a large Victorian townhouse at 17 Palmerston Place in Edinburgh's West End.

Blyth stood as the Unionist candidate for the 1911 Haddingtonshire by-election, but lost to the Liberal candidate, John Deans Hope by 468 votes. One of Blyth's policies was opposing Irish Home Rule.

== Death ==
Blyth was widowed on 12 September 1914. He died in North Berwick on 13 May 1917, of "spittielioma of tongue" and was survived by his daughter. His nephew, Benjamin Hall Blyth (sometimes referred to as Benjamin Blyth III) was the son of his brother Francis Creswick Blyth – who was taken on by Blyth and Blyth in 1909, continued the consultancy after his death.

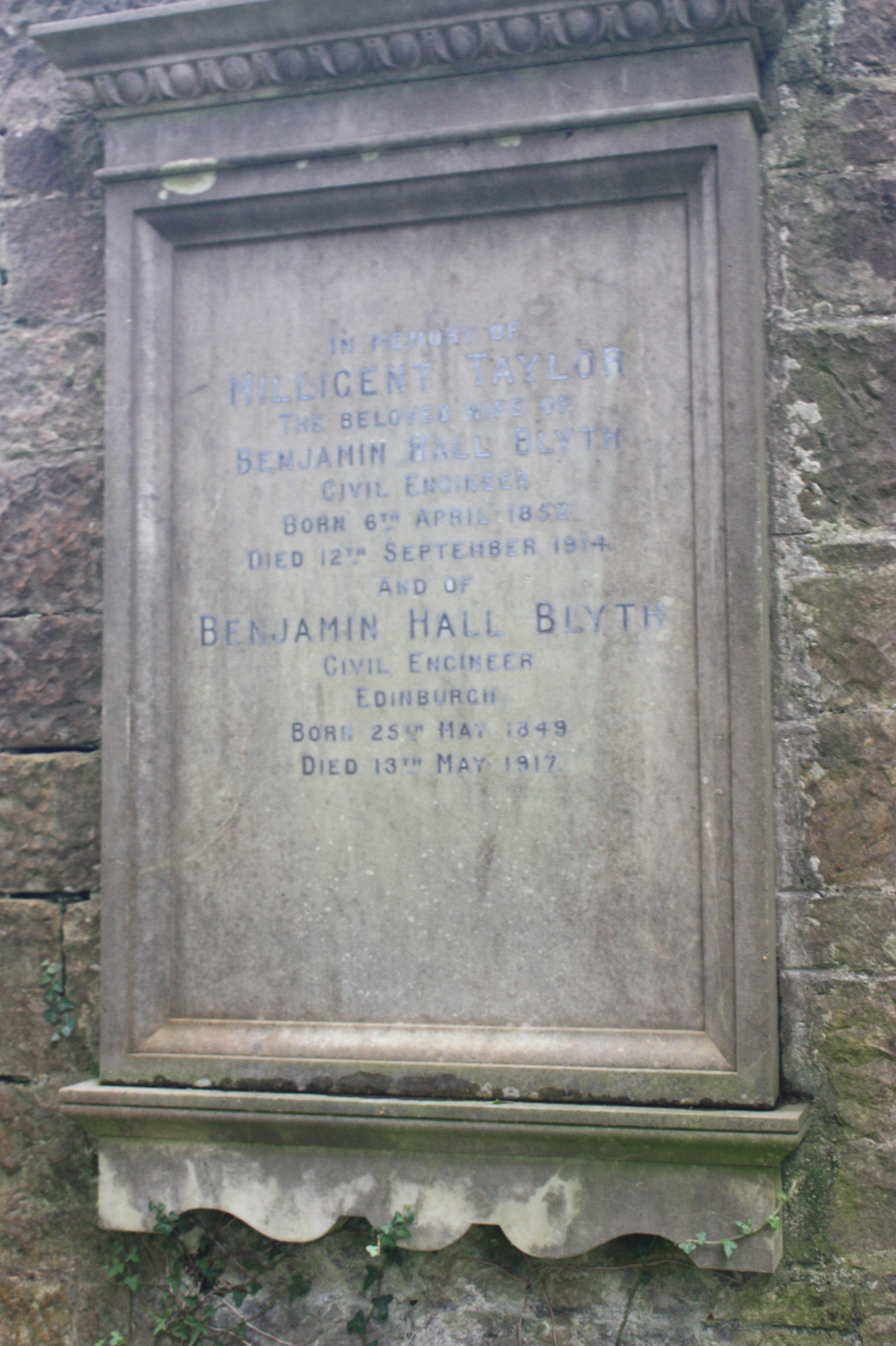
The grave of Benjamin Hall Blyth, Dean Cemetery

He is buried on the obscured southern terrace of Dean Cemetery in Edinburgh, towards the east. His wife, Millicent Taylor (1852-1914) is buried with him. Their infant son, Benjamin Edward Blyth, who died in 1875 aged six weeks lies at their feet.

== Legacy ==
He trained James Simpson Pirie FRSE (1861-1943), founder of J S Pirie & Sons. Pirie ran Blyth & Blyth from his death until the end of the war.

Professional and academic associations
Preceded by Anthony George Lyster	President of the Institution of Civil Engineers; November 1914 – November 1915	Succeeded by Alexander Ross
