= Andrew Drybrough =

Scotland international rugby union player

- Born: Andrew Stanley Drybrough; 6 March 1878 Edinburgh, Scotland
- Died: 12 September 1946 (aged 68) Berwick-upon-Tweed, England

Rugby union career
- Position: Centre
Amateur team(s)
Years	Team	Apps	(Points)
- Edinburgh Wanderers
- Merchistonians
Provincial / State sides
Years	Team	Apps	(Points)
- Edinburgh District
International career
Years	Team	Apps	(Points)
1902-03	Scotland	2	(0)

Andrew Drybrough (6 March 1878 - 12 September 1946) was a Scotland international rugby union player

== Rugby Union career ==
=== Amateur career ===
Drybrough played for Edinburgh Wanderers and Merchistonians.

=== Provincial career ===
He was capped by Edinburgh District in 1902 playing in the Inter-City match against Glasgow District.

=== International career ===
He was capped 2 times for the Scotland international side, in the period 1902 to 1903.
