= James Hodsdon =

Scottish surgeon (1858–1928)

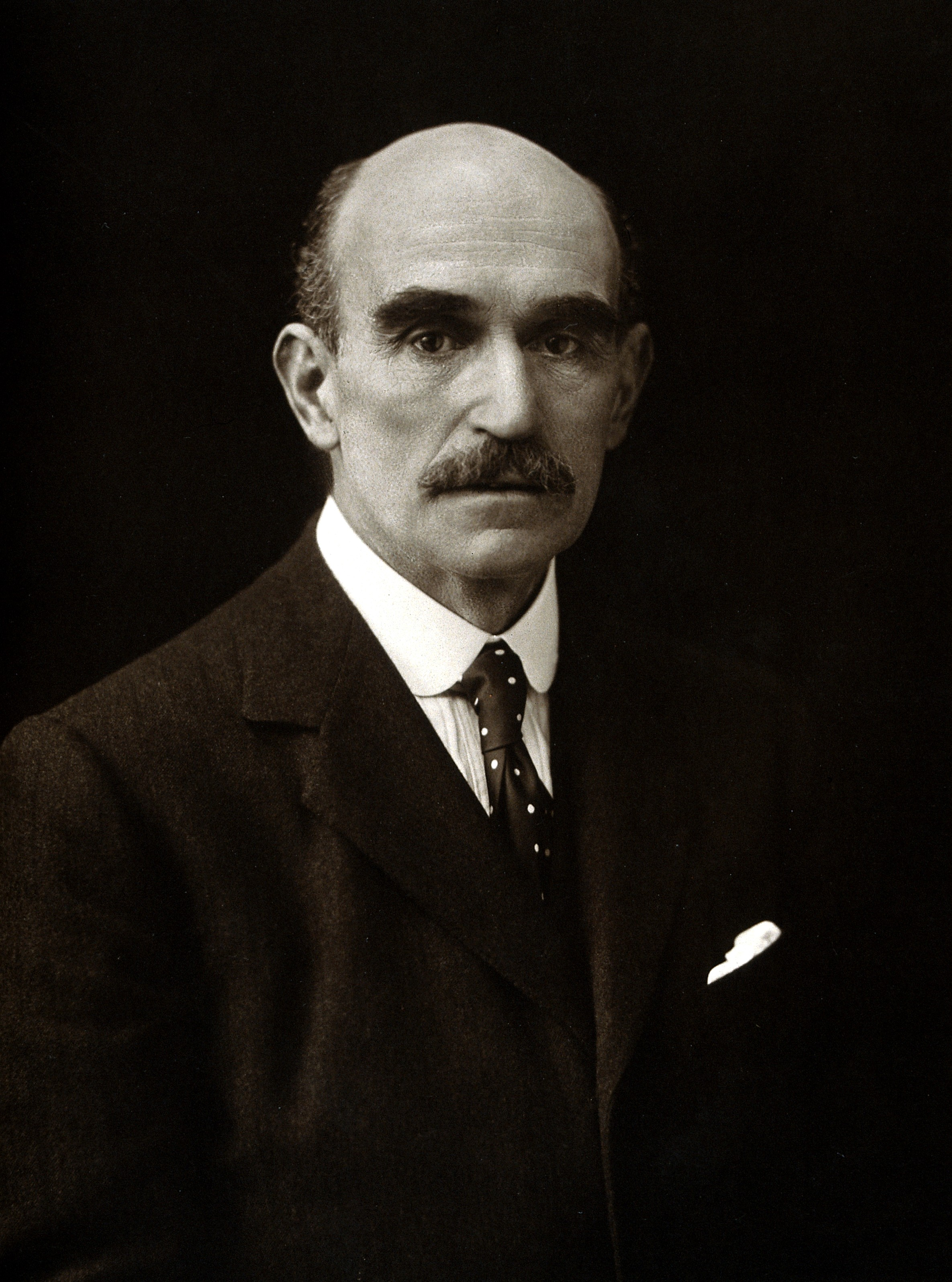
Sir James Hodsdon

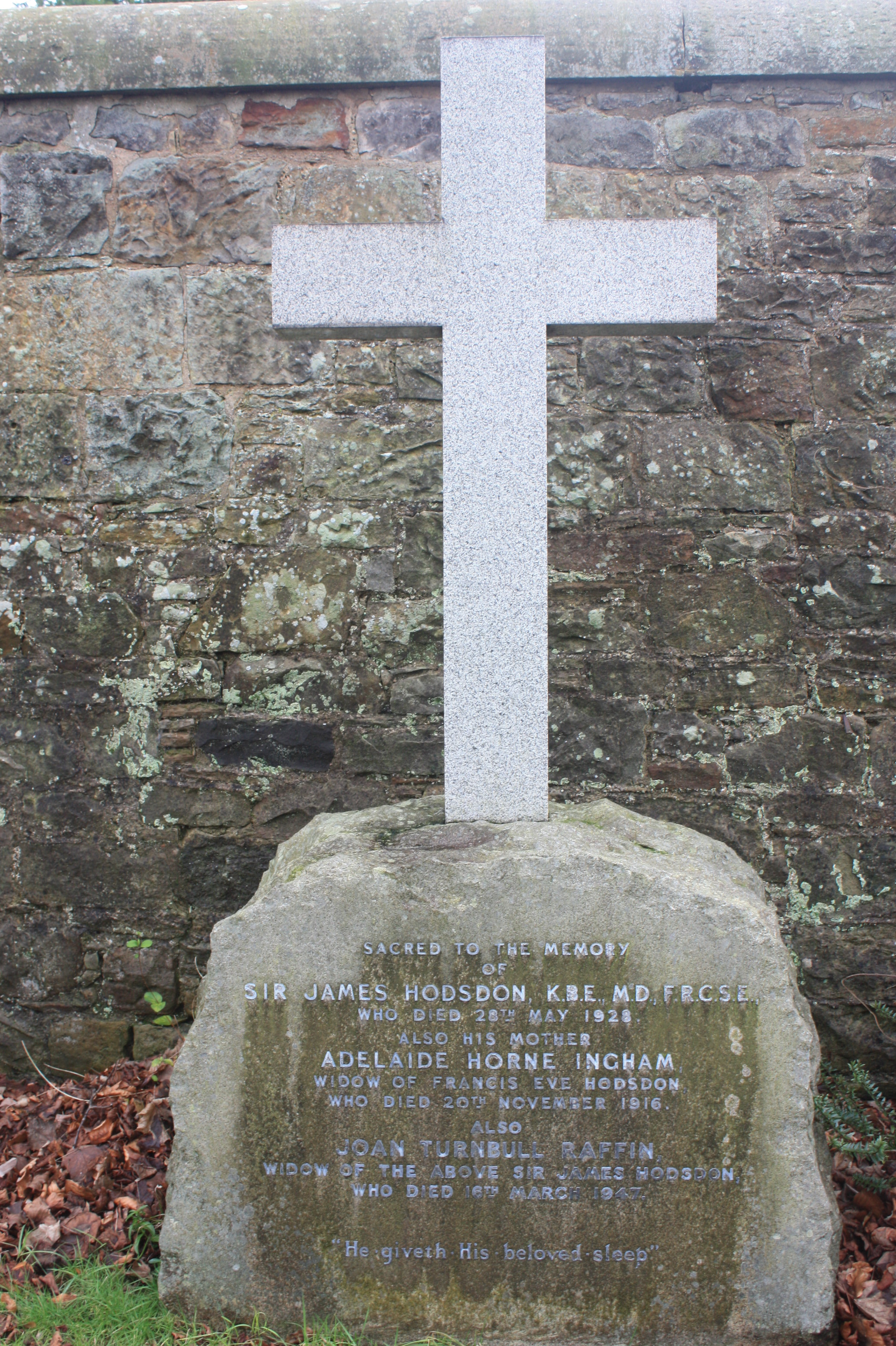
The grave of Sir James Hodsdon, Dean Cemetery

Sir James William Beeman Hodsdon KBE, FRCSEd (1858-1928) was an eminent Scottish surgeon who served as president of the Royal College of Surgeons of Edinburgh 1914–1917.

== Life ==
Hodsdon was born and raised in Bermuda, the son of Adelaide Horne Ingham (died 1916) and Francis Eve Hodsdon. His later education was at Sherborne School in England. He studied medicine at Queen's College, Belfast and the University of Edinburgh, graduating MD around 1880. He did further postgraduate studies in London, Vienna and Paris.

For most of his adult life he lived and practiced in Edinburgh, working as consultant surgeon at the Edinburgh Royal Infirmary and living latterly at 6 Chester Street in Edinburgh's West End. From 1886 to 1909 he also taught in the Edinburgh Extramural School of Medicine, lecturing in surgery in the Edinburgh College of Medicine for Women. He also lectured in clinical surgery at the University of Edinburgh.

In 1889 he was elected a member of the Harveian Society of Edinburgh. In 1914 he succeeded Francis Mitchell Caird as president of the Royal College of Surgeons of Edinburgh. In 1917 he stepped down and acted simply as vice president until 1919. This period, during the First World War, also saw him concurrently serving as a major in the Royal Army Medical Corps, based in Edinburgh at the 2nd Scottish General Hospital at Craigleith (now Edinburgh's Western General Hospital).

In later life he acted as examiner in surgery for the University of Edinburgh, Durham University and Queen's College, Belfast. He was knighted in 1920. He was also elected a member of the Aesculapian Club in 1920.

He died in a sleeping car of a train travelling from London to Edinburgh on 28 May 1928. He is buried in Dean Cemetery in western Edinburgh with his wife and mother, on the south path of the northern Victorian Extension, towards the east end, backing onto the original cemetery.

== Family ==
He married Joan Turnbull Raffin (d.1947) in 1889.

== Artistic recognition ==
His portrait by Walter Stoneman is held by the National Portrait Gallery, London.
