= Moondla Chattan =

Moondla Chattan Moondla Jahan
- village
- Location within Madhya Pradesh Location within India
- Coordinates: 23.751584°N 77.461542°E
- Country: India
- State: Madhya Pradesh
- District: Bhopal
- Tehsil: Berasia

Population (2011)
  - Total: 485
- Time zone: UTC+5:30 (IST)
- ISO 3166 code: MP-IN
- Census code: 482153

Moondla Chattan is a village in the Bhopal district of Madhya Pradesh, India. It is located in the Berasia tehsil.

== Demographics ==
According to the 2011 census of India, Moondla Chattan has 106 households. The effective literacy rate (i.e. the literacy rate of population excluding children aged 6 and below) is 48.83%.

Demographics (2011 Census)
	Total	Male	Female
Population	485	254	231
Children aged below 6 years	102	50	52
Scheduled caste	46	22	24
Scheduled tribe	56	31	25
Literates	187	128	59
Workers (all)	130	122	8
Main workers (total)	86	84	2
Main workers: Cultivators	71	69	2
Main workers: Agricultural labourers	6	6	0
Main workers: Household industry workers	0	0	0
Main workers: Other	9	9	0
Marginal workers (total)	44	38	6
Marginal workers: Cultivators	1	0	1
Marginal workers: Agricultural labourers	41	37	4
Marginal workers: Household industry workers	0	0	0
Marginal workers: Others	2	1	1
Non-workers	355	132	223
