= Diego Pereira d'Aguilar =

Spanish noble

Moses Pereira, 1st Baron D'Aguilar

Baron Diego Lopes Pereira d'Aguilar (born 5 November 1699 Portugal; died 10 August 1759, London) was a Portuguese-born London-based Jewish businessman, community leader and philanthropist, originally a Portuguese converso, who lived in the 18th century. He was created a baron of the Holy Roman Empire by Empress Maria Theresa of Austria.

== Biography ==
In 1722 he went from Lisbon to London, and then to Vienna. From 1725 to 1747 he held the tobacco monopoly in Austria, and had the power to establish factories and regulate prices. When in 1747 he asked the government to return to him a part of the money that he had deposited on account of the revenues, the empress Maria Theresa replied: "This appears to me just. I owe him much more; therefore, return it to him." D'Aguilar was a great favorite with the empress, who commissioned him to rebuild and enlarge the imperial palace at Schönbrunn, and he advanced 300,000 florins for the work.

In recognition of his services Maria Theresa made him a baron and privy councillor to the crown of the (Austrian) Netherlands and Italy. He was a Baron of the Holy Roman Empire. D'Aguilar, who together with his family enjoyed the greatest freedom of belief, was the founder of the Spanish or Turco-Jewish community in Vienna, and succeeded in obtaining many concessions for the relief of his oppressed fellow worshippers. As a result of his efforts the Jews of Moravia were protected from pillage in 1742, and the intention of Maria Theresa to expel the Jews from the whole of the Austrian empire, in 1748 or 1749, was abandoned. He left Vienna suddenly in 1749, because the Spanish government demanded his extradition. He went to London. Before leaving Vienna he presented the community which he had founded, as well as the Spanish-Jewish community of Temesvar, with beautiful silver crowns for the scrolls of the Law, upon which his name was inscribed. On the Day of Atonement a prayer was said for the repose of his soul by the Turco-Jewish community of Vienna.

He matriculated his arms: Gules an eagle Or beneath a plate, on a chief Argent three hillocks Vert on each a pear Or slipped Vert. The crest is a demi-lion proper, wearing a castellation Azure on its head and holding a sprig of leaves Vert in its right paw.

== Personal life ==
He married, 1722, Donna Simha da Fonseca (died 1755) and had issue including his main heir Ephraim Lópes Pereira d'Aguilar, 2nd Baron d'Aguilar.

1. Aron d'Aguilar (born 1725)
2. Sarah d'Aguilar (1728—12 December 1801), married Isaac Jesurum Alvares and had issue.
3. Rachel d'Aguilar (1730—October 1789)
4. Rebecca d'Aguilar (1732—10 January 1803)
5. Hannah d'Aguilar (1734—25 January 1763)
6. Esther d'Aguilar (1739-30 September 1791), married Isaac Henriques Sequeira and had issue.
7. Baron Ephraim Lópes Pereira d'Aguilar (1739—16 March 1802), married Simha Mendes da Costa and had issue.
8. Leah d'Aguilar (1742—11 November 1808), married Raphael Franco and had issue.
9. David d'Aguilar (1744–1790), married Rebecca Baruh Lousada
10. Judith d'Aguilar (8 May 1747—19 November 1821), married Isaac Baruh Lousada, one of their sons was Emanuel Lousada, who owned slave plantations in Jamaica and Barbados.
11. Abigail d'Aguilar (12 May 1749–1822)
12. Joseph d'Aguilar (1750—31 July 1774)
13. Solomon d'Aguilar (1752—28 October 1817), married Margaret Gillmer and had issue included George Charles d'Aguilar
14. Benjamin d'Aguilar (1753—12 July 1813), issue included George Thomas d'Aguilar
15. Hananel d'Aguilar (1754—28 November 1809), married Rebecca Treves and had issue, including Joseph d’Aguilar, father-in-law of Alexander Joseph Lindo. Relocated to Jamaica as slave plantation owner at the Carlisle and Knights Estates.
