= George Buchanan McClure =

Scotland international rugby union player

- Born: George Buchanan McClure; 8 July 1851 Glasgow, Scotland
- Died: 11 July 1888 (aged 37) New South Wales, Australia
- Occupation: Stockbroker

Rugby union career
Amateur team(s)
Years	Team	Apps	(Points)
- West of Scotland
International career
Years	Team	Apps	(Points)
1873	Scotland	1	

George Buchanan McClure was a Scottish rugby football player and along with his brother James Howe McClure, has the distinction of being the first twin to be capped in international rugby.

== Early life ==
George Buchanan McClure, also known as Joe, was born on 8 July 1851 in the Barony district of Glasgow, the son of James Howe McClure and Grace (née Buchanan). He was one of two brothers; James Howe McClure is thought to have been the first to be born. They were James and Grace's fifth and sixth children. His father remarried in 1872 to Charlotte Russell, sister of the Welsh entrepreneur James Cholmeley Russell.

== Rugby career ==
George played his club rugby for West of Scotland FC. He was capped once for Scotland in 1873 in the third match between Scotland and England. This was played at Hamilton Crescent, Glasgow and ended in a 0–0 tie. His twin brother, James Howe McClure, was also capped for Scotland in the previous year, making them the first twins to be capped in international rugby – the only other twins to be capped for Scotland are Finlay and Jim Calder. Both George and his brother retired at the end of the 1875 season. They were great Club men and both held office for West of Scotland FC.

== Personal life ==
Six years after his rugby retirement, in 1881, he was still living at home at 13 Windsor Terrace with his brother. George was a member of the Glasgow stock exchange. In 1884 he married Helen S Thomson in the Blythswood district of Glasgow and they went to Australia. In New South Wales they had at least two sons, James Howe McClure in 1885 and George Buchanan McClure II in 1887. In the Great Western Railway Shareholders Register he is listed as having died on 11 July 1888, at the age of 36. He is also listed in the Register with addresses in Scotland and New South Wales. His executor were his brother James Howe McClure and his stepmother's brother James Cholmeley Russell.
