= Charles Crosse =

English sportsman (1854–1905)

- Born: Charles William Crosse; 13 June 1854 Bushey, Hertfordshire; England
- Died: 28 May 1905 (aged 50) Paris, France

Rugby union career
- Position: Forward
International career
Years	Team	Apps	(Points)
1874–1875	England	2	(0)

Charles William Crosse (13 June 1854 – 28 May 1905) was an English sportsman who played international rugby union for England and first-class cricket.

Crosse was capped twice for England, first against Scotland in 1874 and the other against Ireland a year later, both times as a forward.

In 1875, Crosse played a first-class cricket match for Oxford University. A right handed top order batsman, he made just five and eight in the only two innings of his first-class career. He also represented Scotland at cricket, playing a match against Yorkshire in 1878. Previously, he had played cricket while at Rugby School before going up to Trinity College, Oxford.
