= John Lisle Hall McFarlane =

Scotland international rugby union player

John McFarlane
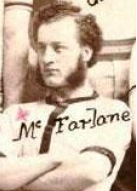
- Born: John Lisle Hall McFarlane; 19 June 1851 Montego Bay, Jamaica
- Died: 17 March 1874 (aged 22) Edinburgh, Scotland
- University: Edinburgh University

Rugby union career
- Position: Forward
Amateur team(s)
Years	Team	Apps	(Points)
- Edinburgh University
Provincial / State sides
Years	Team	Apps	(Points)
- Edinburgh District
International career
Years	Team	Apps	(Points)
1871–1873	Scotland	3	(0)

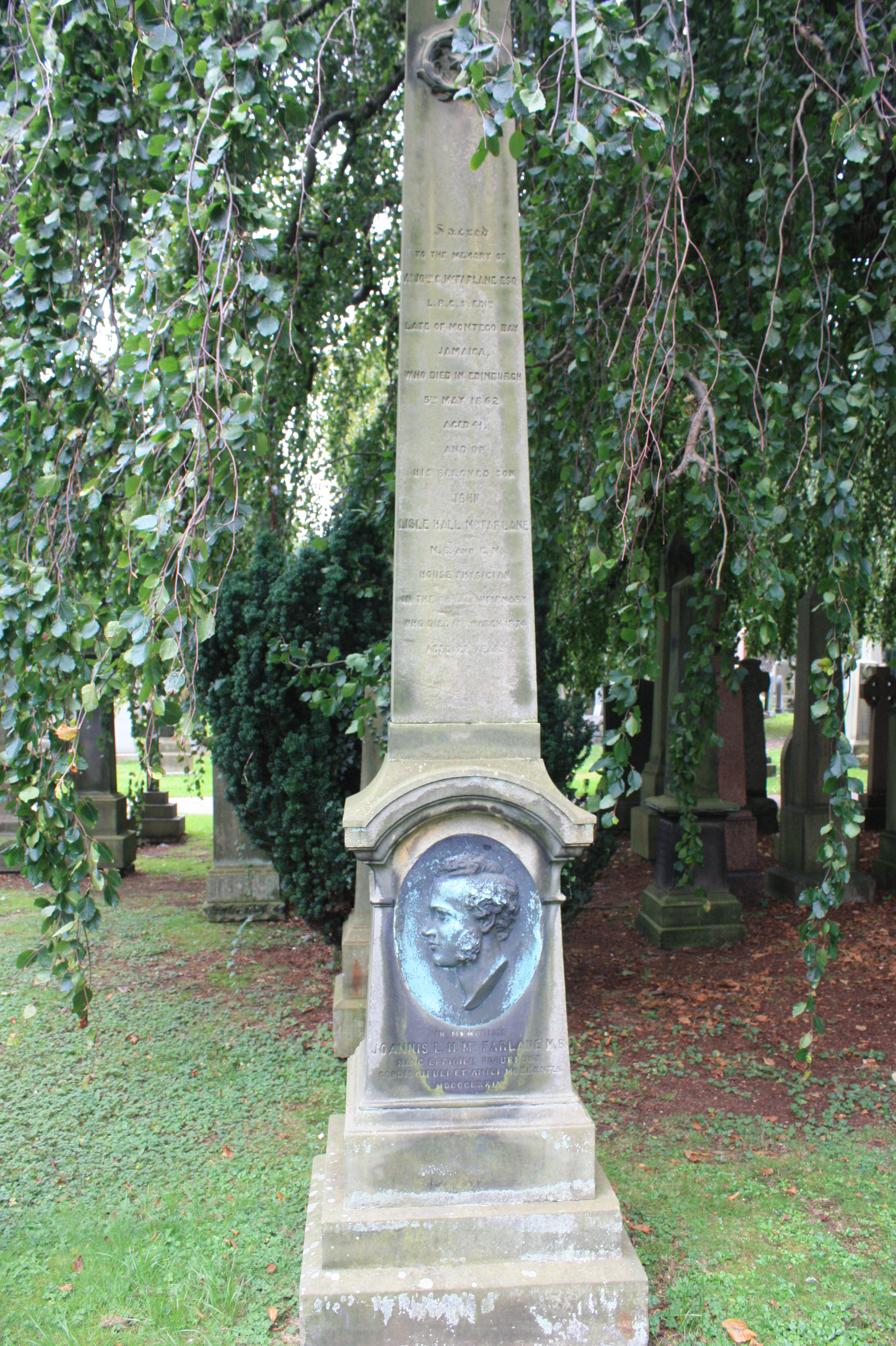
The grave of John L H McFarlane, Dean Cemetery, Edinburgh

Dr John Lisle Hall McFarlane MB ChB (19 June 1851 – 17 March 1874) was a Scottish physician and international rugby union player and sportsman.

== Personal history ==
McFarlane was born in Montego Bay, Jamaica in 1851 to John MacFarlane, and Edinburgh-educated surgeon, who had married Anna Smith, the daughter of a Jamaican estate owner. McFarlane's middle name of Lisle was taken from his mother's forebears who held connections to the Barons Lisle. McFarlane grew up in Scotland and was educated at several of the country's finest schools. He attended the Edinburgh Institute of Maths before switching as a boarder at the private Abbey Park School in St Andrews. It was at the establishments that he developed his enjoyment of sport and where he began to play rugby. In 1869 he left Abbey Park to enrol at Craigmount School, supposedly just to get into the cricket team.

McFarlane matriculated to Edinburgh University where he studied medicine. There he excelled across the sporting fields, playing cricket, representing the University in rugby and in athletics was the school's champion in hurdles, long jump and sprinting. In 1871, McFarlane's ability on the ruby field saw him selected as the sole member of the Edinburgh University team to be selected for the Scotland national team in the first ever rugby international. McFarlane was selected in the forward positions for the first international, in which Scotland beat England by a goal to nil. McFarlane was selected for the next international the following year, again against England. On this occasion, England were victorious. McFarlane's final international was the 1873 meeting between Scotland and England, where McFarlane played in the three-quarters position. The game finished as a scoreless draw.

Having finished college, McFarlane became a resident doctor at the Edinburgh Royal Infirmary. He still continued to play rugby for Edinburgh University. McFarlane also continued to play cricket during this period as his 'summer game'. He played for Carlton Cricket Club in Edinburgh and despite being just 19 was made first team vice-captain in 1871 and again in 1872. He was also the team's leading batsman in 1870.

== Death ==
In early 1874, McFarlane played for Edinburgh University against Glasgow University. The game ended in a draw, but McFarlane scored a try and impressed enough to be selected for the upcoming fourth Scotland international against England. A week later he again turned out for Edinburgh University against Royal High School RFC. McFarlane kicked the winning goal in the first quarter of the game, but in the final moments of the match he fell awkwardly and dislocated his knee. The injury itself was not life-threatening, but he was left for a considerable time on the cold ground before being moved for treatment.

McFarlane returned home to Buccleuch Place in Edinburgh, where he developed rheumatic fever. This in turn was aggravated by pericarditis. McFarlane spent five weeks bed-ridden, cared for by his mother and family, and appeared to make a recovery only to suffer from a severe relapse which saw him rushed to Edinburgh Royal Infirmary. His colleagues failed to save his life and he died on 17 March at the age of 22.

A popular figure, his funeral was attended by a large number of students who walked in procession with his body from the infirmary to Dean Cemetery. A public subscription raised enough money for a 12-foot stone obelisk to be erected at his grave, which also bears a relief portrait of McFarlane. The sculpture is by Edinburgh's leading sculptor of the day, Sir John Steell. The grave stands towards the north-west within the original cemetery.
