= Francis d'Aguilar =

Scotland international rugby union player

- Born: Francis Burton Grant d'Aguilar; 11 December 1849
- Died: 24 July 1896 (aged 46) (registered in) Bath (aged 46 years 226 days)

Rugby union career
- Position: Forward
Senior career
| Years | Team | Apps | (Points) |
- Royal Engineers
| – | Bath | | |
| – | Somerset | | |
International career
| Years | Team | Apps | (Points) |
| 1872 | England | 1 | |

Francis d'Aguilar (1849–1896) was a rugby union international who represented England in 1872, scoring a try in that match.

== Early life ==
Francis d'Aguilar was born on 11 December 1849. He was the grandson of Lieutenant-Colonel George Thomas d'Aguilar and Catherine Burton, who between them reportedly had 20 children. George Thomas d'Aguilar having secured a commission on the Bengal Establishment of the Honourable East India Company's service, left England and was posted to the 13th Madras Native Infantry and was promoted to the rank of Lieutenant on 29 May 1800. He eventually died in Calcutta on 9 October 1839. Francis' grandmother, Catherine Burton, was the daughter of Reverend Edward Burton, Vicar of Annaghdown, County Galway and Maria Margaretta Campbell, who it is claimed was descended from Louis XIV of France by a Countess of Montmorency. Francis uncle was the explorer Sir Richard Francis Burton (1821–1890).

== Rugby union career ==
D'Aguilar played rugby for the Royal Engineers within the army and made his international debut on 5 February 1872 in front of 4,000 spectators at The Oval in the England vs Scotland match. This was the second time the teams had met and in fact the second international match, as well as being the first time England had hosted an international rugby match. England won the match, a reversal of the previous year's result in Scotland. In this 1872 meeting Scotland opened the scoring with a drop goal from Cathcart. England responded through Hamersley touching down for a try. In itself, the try was not worth any points, but afforded England a "try at goal" and this was converted by Francis Isherwood. England then scored a dropgoal from the boot of Freeman in the second half. England continued to dominate and Francis d'Aguilar himself scored a try but Isherwood failed to convert d'Aguilar's try, thus no points were scored. Finney's try for England was also not converted. However, England prevailed by two goals to one, with two extra tries. Shortly after his international appearance he was posted to India and spent much of his life there. He did return to England in the early part of the 1880s and on his return played for Bath as well as Somerset. His participation for Bath made him the earliest international to play for Bath, though he had already been capped when he joined them. Thus, Herbert Fuller who represented England in 1882 remains Bath's first international whilst playing for the club.

== Military career and later life ==
D'Aguilar attended the Royal Military Academy, Woolwich. He followed in the footsteps of Charles Sherrard in gaining international honours shortly after leaving that institution. On 1 December 1870 was promoted from Gentleman Cadet to Lieutenant, with temporary rank. He was promoted from the rank of captain to major in 1889. D'Aguilar spent most of his life in India and was married there to Frances Louisa Stockwell in 1874. In 1876 they had a son, John Burton Stockwell D'Aguilar, in 1885 a daughter, Frances Windfred D'Aguilar, and in 1887 a daughter, Violet Marion D'Aguilar, all christened in Dalhousie, West Bengal, India. In 1889 another daughter was born, Rose Aileen D'Aguilar, in Mean Meer, Bengal, India. Francis' son, John, like his father played rugby for Bath as well as Somerset.
