= Andrew Galbraith Colville =

Scotland international rugby union player

Andrew Colville
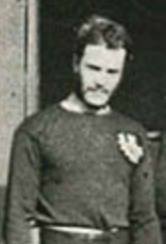
- Born: Andrew Galbraith Colville; 17 December 1846 Edinburgh, Scotland
- Died: 17 April 1881 (aged 34) Bournemouth, England

Rugby union career
- Position: Forward
Amateur team(s)
Years	Team	Apps	(Points)
-	Blackheath F.C.		
-	Merchistonians		
International career
Years	Team	Apps	(Points)
1871-2	Scotland	2	(0)

Andrew Colville (17 December 1846 – 17 April 1881) was a Scottish international rugby union player who played for Merchistonians in Edinburgh.

Born in Edinburgh in 1848, Colville played as a Forward.

Colville played in the first ever rugby union international match for Scotland against England on 27 March 1871

He was selected again in the return match the following year. On 5 February 1872 he played for Scotland against England at The Oval.
