= Moondla, Jamwa Ramgarh =

Village in Jaipur district, India

Moondla (also Mundla) is a village situated in the taluka of Jamwa Ramgarh, in Jaipur district, in the state of Rajasthan, India.

== Demographics ==
Its total population is 1156 including 160 children below the age of 6 years. The percentage of child population is 13.84%. There are 180 houses in the village.

↓
610	546
Male	Female
