= William St Clair Grant (rugby union) =

Scotland international rugby union player

William St. Clair Grant
- Born: William St. Clair Grant; 20 July 1853 Bengal, India
- Died: 17 February 1896 (aged 42) Bengal, India

Rugby union career
- Position: Half back
Amateur team(s)
Years	Team	Apps	(Points)
- Craigmount
Provincial / State sides
Years	Team	Apps	(Points)
1872-73	Edinburgh District		
International career
Years	Team	Apps	(Points)
1873-74	Scotland	2	(0)

William St. Clair Grant Snr. (20 July 1853 – 17 February 1896) was a Scotland international rugby union player.

== Rugby Union career ==
=== Amateur career ===
Grant played for Craigmount RFC.

=== Provincial career ===
Grant represented Edinburgh District. He played in the world's first two representative provincial matches in the 1872–73 season.

=== International career ===
Grant represented the Scotland international rugby union team twice.

== Family ==
His son William St Clair Grant was a cricketer.
