= Merchistonian FC =

Scottish rugby union club, based in Edinburgh

(Scotland) Merchistonian
- Full name: Merchistonian Football Club
- Union: SRU
- Founded: 1860; 166 years ago
- Location: Edinburgh, Scotland
Team kit

Merchistonian Football Club is a rugby football team based in Edinburgh, Scotland. It was for former pupils of Merchiston Castle School. It is believed the club was established in 1860.

== History ==
=== Beginning ===
Merchistonian was a founding member of the Scottish Rugby Union and one of the five Scottish clubs to issue the challenge to English football players that resulted in the first rugby international. The club supplied three players for the match Andrew Galbraith Colville, George Ritchie and the scorer of the match's only goal (conversion) William Cross. Cross also scored one of Scotland's two tries to England's one however, at the time, tries did not result in points merely a 'try' at scoring a goal and Scotland won the match 1–0.

=== Decline ===
However, as Allan Massie notes, because it was a boarding school, unlike some of the other private schools in Edinburgh, a lot of the former pupils would disperse and go out of the city. Those that remained in the city would often play for Edinburgh Wanderers.

=== Revival ===
In 2013, the Merchistonian Club (the School's former pupil society) revived the rugby team under the name "Merchistonian Rugby Football Club" (Merchistonian RFC). The side played its first match against traditional rival Edinburgh Academical with both sides fielding a strictly former pupil team (rather than Accies open first XV) at Raeburn Place on 29 March, losing 31–20. The intent was to play this fixture on an annual basis.

Merchistonian RFC also competed in a number of sevens competitions and the Edinburgh 10s in 2014.

=== Status ===
In 2017, the Scottish Rugby Union board granted the Merchistonian RFC its historic status of being a Football Club (FC) instead of a Rugby Football Club (RFC). Historically rugby clubs were also known as football clubs so once again the rugby club is named the 'Merchistonian Football Club' (MFC).

== Notable players ==
=== Scotland internationalists ===
The following former Merchiston F.C. players have represented Scotland at full international level.

- (Scotland) Thomas Anderson
- (Scotland) Andrew Drybrough
- (Scotland) James Campbell
- (Scotland) Gordon Neilson
- (Scotland) Tom Whittington

=== Edinburgh District ===
The following former Merchiston F.C. players have represented Edinburgh District at provincial level.

- (Scotland) Tom Whittington
- (Scotland) E. Thew
- (Scotland) Benjamin Blyth II
- (Scotland) Andrew Drybrough

=== British and Irish Lions ===
The following former Merchiston F.C. players have represented the British and Irish Lions.

- (Scotland) William Lovat Fraser

== SRU presidents ==
Former Merchistonians have been President of the SRU:

- 1875–76 Benjamin Blyth II
- 1882-83 William Cross

== See also ==
- Fettesian-Lorettonian Club
