= Tom Whittington (rugby union) =

Scotland international rugby union player

- Born: Thomas Price Whittington; 19 August 1848 Tonna, Neath, Wales
- Died: 7 October 1919 (aged 71) Neath, Wales
- School: Merchiston Castle School

Rugby union career
- Position: Forward
Amateur team(s)
Years	Team	Apps	(Points)
- Merchistonians
Provincial / State sides
Years	Team	Apps	(Points)
1872-73	Edinburgh District	2	(0)
International career
Years	Team	Apps	(Points)
1873	Scotland	1	(0)

Tom Whittington (19 August 1848 – 7 October 1919) was a Scotland international rugby union player who represented Scotland in 1873.

Although from Wales, Whittington was schooled in Edinburgh. He played cricket for Merchiston Castle School

== Rugby Union career ==
=== Amateur career ===
After his Scottish schooling Whittington played as a forward for Merchistonians; which was the Former Pupils side of Merchiston Castle School.

=== Provincial career ===
The selection of players to the District sides were open to any nationality; albeit the sides were viewed as a stepping stone to the international team.

He represented Edinburgh District against Glasgow District in the world's first provincial match, the 'inter-city', on 23 November 1872.

=== International career ===
Whittington's time in Scotland being schooled; his remaining residence in Scotland to play for the Former Pupil side; and his performances in the Inter-City matches against Glasgow District; offered Whittington a gateway for selection for Scotland.

His international debut was the home match on 3 March 1873 at Glasgow. It was his only appearance for Scotland.

== Family ==
His son Tom Whittington played cricket for Glamorgan.
