= George d'Aguilar =

British Army general and governor of Hong Kong

Major-General Sir George d'Aguilar KCB
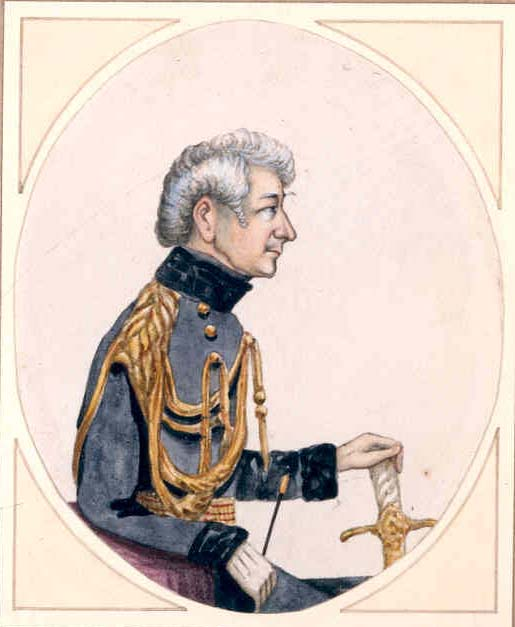
- D'Aguilar, c. 1845
- Born: January 1784
- Died: 21 May 1855 (aged 71)
- Military career
- Allegiance: United Kingdom
- Branch: British Army
- Rank: Major-General
- Commands: Commander and Lieutenant Governor of Hong Kong; South-West District
- Conflicts: Napoleonic Wars; Walcheren Campaign; Hundred Days; Expedition to Canton
- Awards: Knight Commander of the Order of the Bath

Major-General Sir George Charles d'Aguilar, KCB (Chinese: 德忌笠/德己立; Cantonese Yale: Dākgéilaahp; January 1784 – 21 May 1855) was a British Army officer who served as Lieutenant Governor of Hong Kong (1843–1848).

== Background ==
He was born the son of Solomon d'Aguilar (1752–1817) of Liverpool and Margaret Gillmer (1753–1829). The d'Aguilars were a military family directly descended from Baron Diego d'Aguilar, a Portuguese-born Jewish nobleman and businessman in the court of Maria Theresa of Austria. He was baptised Anglican at St Maurice's Church, Winchester in Hampshire on 10 February 1785. His first cousin and contemporary, Lieutenant-Colonel George Thomas d'Aguilar (1783–1839) married Catherine Burton, aunt of the noted explorer Sir Richard Francis Burton. Ephraim Lópes Pereira d'Aguilar, 2nd Baron d'Aguilar was an uncle.

== Military service ==
He entered the army in 1799 as an ensign with the 86th (Royal County Down) Regiment of Foot which was stationed in India. He remained there until 1808, and during that time served for three years as Adjutant of the 86th Foot (consisting of nearly the whole of Richard Wellesley, 1st Marquess Wellesley's administration) and two years on the general staff of the army, as brigade major.

He was with the regiment at the reduction of various forts in the Malwa and Guzerat districts and at Gerard Lake, 1st Viscount Lake's unsuccessful assaults on Bharatpur, India. Having been promoted to a company in the 81st, he returned to England in May, 1809, and the following month embarked for Walcheren. After the fall of Flushing, Netherlands he was appointed aide-de-camp to Lieutenant-General Mahon, afterwards Lord Hartland, until he returned to England with the cavalry under Mahon. In 1809 he married Eliza, second daughter of Peter Drinkwater of Irwell House, Lancashire.

He was subsequently on the staff as assistant adjutant-general in Sicily, where he was sent by Lord William Bentinck on a military mission to the court of Ali Pasha at Ioannina and Constantinople. He also served as military secretary to the army on the Eastern coast of Spain under Sir John Murray, 8th Baronet and Sir William Henry Clinton.

In 1813 he was appointed a major in the Greek Light Infantry and took command of the regiment prior to the final reduction of the Greek Islands. In 1815 he joined Arthur Wellesley, 1st Duke of Wellington's army and was present at the capture of Paris. In 1817 he was appointed a major with the Rifle Brigade and placed on half-pay.

He translated Napoleon's military maxims into English in 1831, annotating them with examples from the careers of Gustavus Adolphus, Turenne, Prince Eugene, Frederick the Great, and Napoleon himself.

Altogether d'Aguilar served for twenty six years on the general staff, during eight of which he was assistant adjutant-general at the Horse Guards, principally under Prince Frederick, Duke of York and Albany, and for twelve years assistant adjutant-general of the army in Ireland. In 1841, he was promoted to major-general.

== Lieutenant-Governor of Hong Kong ==
As Commander of the British troops in China, D'Aguilar arrived in Hong Kong aboard HMS Castor on 27 December 1843. He was appointed Lieutenant Governor of Hong Kong on 11 January 1844. The Headquarter House (renamed to Flagstaff House) in Hong Kong Park was built for him in 1846. He commanded the 1847 Expedition to Canton, which captured the forts of the Canton River from the Bocca Tigris to the city of Canton. The following year, 1848, he returned to England and was given the colonelcy of the 58th (Rutlandshire) Regiment of Foot.

In 1851 he was appointed to command South-West District, remaining in that post until 1852. He died in London on 21 May 1855.

D'Aguilar was a water-colour artist of professional standard.

== Namesakes ==
- Cape D'Aguilar, Hong Kong, China
- D'Aguilar Street, Hong Kong, China
- D'Aguilar National Park, Queensland, Australia
- Town of D'Aguilar, Queensland, Australia

Military offices
Preceded by New Post	Commander and Lieutenant Governor of Hong Kong; 1843–1848	Succeeded by William Staveley
Preceded by Lord Frederick FitzClarence	GOC South-West District; 1851–1852	Succeeded by Sir James Simpson
Preceded by Frederick Maitland	Colonel of the 58th (Rutlandshire) Regiment of Foot; 1848–1851	Succeeded by Edward Buckley Wynyard
