= James Howe McClure =

Scotland international rugby union player

- Born: James Howe McClure; 8 July 1851 Glasgow, Scotland
- Died: 1909 (aged 57–58) Glasgow, Scotland

Rugby union career
Amateur team(s)
Years	Team	Apps	(Points)
- West of Scotland
International career
Years	Team	Apps	(Points)
1872	Scotland	1	

James Howe McClure (8 July 1851 – 1909) was a Scottish rugby football player and along with his brother George Buchanan McClure, has the distinction of being the first twin to be capped in international rugby.

== Early life ==
James Howe McClure was born on 8 July 1851 in the Barony district of Glasgow, the son of James Howe McClure (1812–1891) and Grace (née Buchanan). He was one of twins, his brother George Buchanan McClure deemed to have been born second. They were the fifth and sixth children of James and Grace. His father remarried in 1872 to Charlotte Russell, sister of the Welsh entrepreneur James Cholmeley Russell.

== Rugby career ==
James played his club rugby for West of Scotland FC. He was capped once for Scotland in 1872. His twin brother, George Buchanan McClure, was also capped for Scotland in the next year, making them the first twins to be capped in international rugby – the only other twins to be capped for Scotland are Finlay and Jim Calder.

== Personal life ==
James married Ellen (Ella) Mary Collier (1858–1931) on 29 October 1884. They had five children: Grace Buchanan (1885–1971); George Buchanan (1887–1955); Ellen May (Eiwee) (1889–1979); William Francis Campbell (1892–1940); and James Howe (1899–1967). James died in 1909, outliving his twin by 21 years.
