= Henry William Allan (rugby union) =

Scotland international rugby union player

- Born: Henry William Allan; 2 April 1850 Glasgow, Scotland
- Died: 12 December 1926 (aged 76) Beith, Scotland

Rugby union career
- Position: Forward
Amateur team(s)
Years	Team	Apps	(Points)
- Glasgow Academicals
Provincial / State sides
Years	Team	Apps	(Points)
- Glasgow District
International career
Years	Team	Apps	(Points)
1873	Scotland	1	(0)

Henry William Allan (2 April 1850 – 12 December 1926) was a Scottish rugby union international who represented Scotland in the 1873–74 Home Nations rugby union matches.

He played as a forward for Glasgow Academicals.

He represented Glasgow District against Edinburgh District in the world's first provincial match, the 'inter-city', on 23 November 1872.

He also represented Glasgow District against Edinburgh District in the 5 December 1874 match.
