= John Kennedy Tod =

Scotland international rugby union player

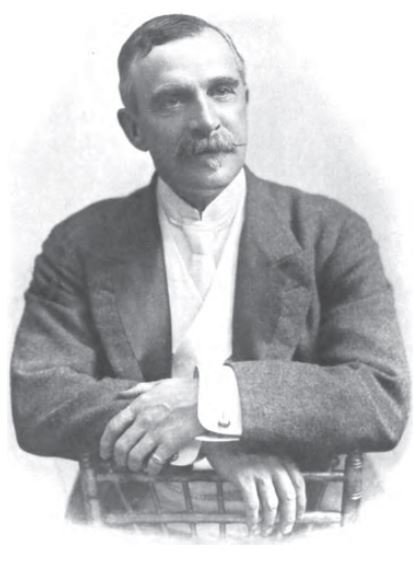
- Born: John Kennedy Tod; 11 September 1852 Glasgow, Scotland
- Died: 2 June 1925 (aged 72) Old Greenwich, Connecticut, United States
- University: Princeton University

Rugby union career
- Position: Forward
Amateur team(s)
Years	Team	Apps	(Points)
- Glasgow Academicals
Provincial / State sides
Years	Team	Apps	(Points)
- Glasgow District
-	West of Scotland District		
International career
Years	Team	Apps	(Points)
1874-75	Scotland	2	(0)

John Kennedy Tod (11 September 1852 – 2 June 1925) was a Scottish-American merchant banker. In his youth he was a Scottish rugby union international who represented Scotland in the 1873–74 Home Nations rugby union matches and 1874–75 Home Nations rugby union matches. Tod was born on 11 September 1852 in Glasgow, Scotland and later moved to America where he attended Princeton University.

== Rugby Union career ==
=== Amateur career ===
He played as a forward for Glasgow Academicals.

=== Provincial career ===
He represented Glasgow District against Edinburgh District in the world's first provincial match, the 'inter-city', on 23 November 1872.

He also represented Glasgow District against Edinburgh District in the 5 December 1874 match.

He also represented the West of Scotland District.

=== International career ===
He played in both Home Nations matches in the 1874–75 seasons against England; home and away. His debut was the away match on 23 February 1874 at The Oval. His only subsequent cap for Scotland was in the home match on 8 March 1875.

== Business career ==
Tod moved to New York and became a banking partner of his uncle John Stewart Kennedy on Wall Street. Tod formed the banking firm of J. Kennedy Tod & Co., of No. 45 Wall Street.

From 1890 to 1897, he took an active part in the reorganization of the railway properties during the disastrous years and was particularly interested in the successful readjustment of the affairs of the Philadelphia and Reading Railway, Norfolk & Western Railroad, St. Louis & San Francisco Railway, San Antonio and Aransas Pass Railway, Minneapolis and St. Louis Railway, Rio Grande Western Railway, Toledo, St. Louis and Western Railroad, Colorado & Southern Railway, Memphis & Charleston Railroad and Baltimore & Ohio Railroad.

He also served as chairman of the Board of Trustees of the Caledonian Insurance Company of Edinburgh; a trustee of the Central Trust Company; the Norwich Union Fire Insurance Company, the Provident Loan Society of New York, and a director of the American Cotton Oil Company, the Bank of New York, and the Indemnity Fire Insurance Company as well as a director of several railroads, insurance companies and banks.

== Personal life ==
He married Mary Howard Potter, the daughter of Howard Potter (an industrialist, investment banker, diplomat and philanthropist) and his wife, Mary Louisa (née Brown) Potter (of the Brown Bros. & Co. family). The Tods had no children.

He was a member of many clubs including the Knickerbocker Club, Metropolitan Club, Lawyers Club, City Club, Downtown Club, Tuxedo Club, the Century Association, the New York Chamber of Commerce, the Seawanhaka Corinthian Yacht Club, the Indian Harbor Yacht Club, the Riverside Yacht Club, the Fairfield County Golf Club (original name of the Greenwich Country Club), and the Social Register of New York. His country estate, known as Innis Arden in Old Greenwich is today a public park called Greenwich Point. Like his uncle, he was president of the Saint Andrew's Society of the State of New York.

Tod died on 2 June 1925 at his summer home in Old Greenwich, Connecticut (previously known as Sound Beach).
