= Harold Freeman (rugby union) =

England international rugby union player

- Born: Harold Freeman; 15 January 1850 Dursley, Gloucestershire
- Died: 15 July 1916 (aged 66) Fitzroy Sq, London
- School: Marlborough College

Rugby union career
- Position: Three-quarters
Amateur team(s)
Years	Team	Apps	(Points)
-	Marlborough Nomads		
International career
Years	Team	Apps	(Points)
1872–1874	England	3	(Goals:2; Tries:0; Conv:0; Pens:0; Drop:2)

Harold Freeman (15 January 1850 – 15 July 1916) was a rugby union international who represented England from the years 1872 to 1874.

== Early life ==
Harold Freeman was born on 15 January 1850 in Dursley, Gloucestershire.

== Rugby union career ==
Freeman made his international debut on 5 February 1872 at The Oval in the England vs Scotland match. Of the three matches he played for his national side he was on the winning side on two occasions. He played his final match for England on 23 February 1874 at The Oval in the England vs Scotland match.
