= Tom Paterson Neilson =

Scotland international rugby union player

Tom Neilson
- Born: Thomas Paterson Neilson; 22 October 1851 Mossend, North Lanarkshire, Scotland
- Died: 19 January 1909 (aged 57) Dunoon, Argyll and Bute, Scotland
- Notable relative(s): John Neilson, (brother)

Rugby union career
- Position: Forwards
Amateur team(s)
Years	Team	Apps	(Points)
- West of Scotland
Provincial / State sides
Years	Team	Apps	(Points)
- Glasgow District
International career
Years	Team	Apps	(Points)
1874	Scotland	1	(0)

Tom Neilson (22 October 1851 – 19 January 1909) was a Scottish international rugby union player. He played as a forward.

He played for West of Scotland, one of the top teams in Scotland at the time.

He was called up for the Glasgow District side for the 1874 provincial match against Edinburgh District on 5 December 1874.

He was called up to the Scotland squad in February 1874 and played England at The Oval on 23 February 1874.

His brother John Alexander Neilson also played rugby union for Glasgow District and Scotland.
