= Charles Chalmers Bryce =

Scotland international rugby union player

- Born: Charles Chalmers Bryce; 16 April 1848 Glasgow, Scotland
- Died: 12 February 1895 (aged 46) Partick, Glasgow, Scotland

Rugby union career
- Position: Forward
Amateur team(s)
Years	Team	Apps	(Points)
- Glasgow Academicals
Provincial / State sides
Years	Team	Apps	(Points)
- Glasgow District
International career
Years	Team	Apps	(Points)
1873-74	Scotland	2	(0)

Charles Chalmers Bryce (16 April 1848 – 12 February 1895) was a Scottish rugby union international who represented Scotland in the 1873–74 Home Nations rugby union matches.

Bryce played as a forward for Glasgow Academicals.

Bryce represented Glasgow District against Edinburgh District in the world's first provincial match, the 'inter-city', on 23 November 1872.

Bryce also represented Glasgow District against Edinburgh District in the 5 December 1874 match.

Bryce played in both Home Nations matches in the 1873-74 season against England; home and away. His debut was the away match on 3 March 1873 at Glasgow. His only subsequent cap for Scotland was in the away match on 23 February 1874.
