= James Finlay (rugby union, born 1852) =

Scotland international rugby union player (1852–1930)

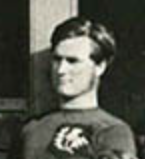
- Born: James Fairbairn Finlay; 8 April 1852 Edinburgh, Scotland
- Died: 25 January 1930 (aged 77) Guildford, England

Rugby union career
- Position: Forward
Amateur team(s)
Years	Team	Apps	(Points)
- Edinburgh Academicals
Provincial / State sides
Years	Team	Apps	(Points)
1872-74	Edinburgh District	5	(0)
International career
Years	Team	Apps	(Points)
1871-75	Scotland	4	((1 try))

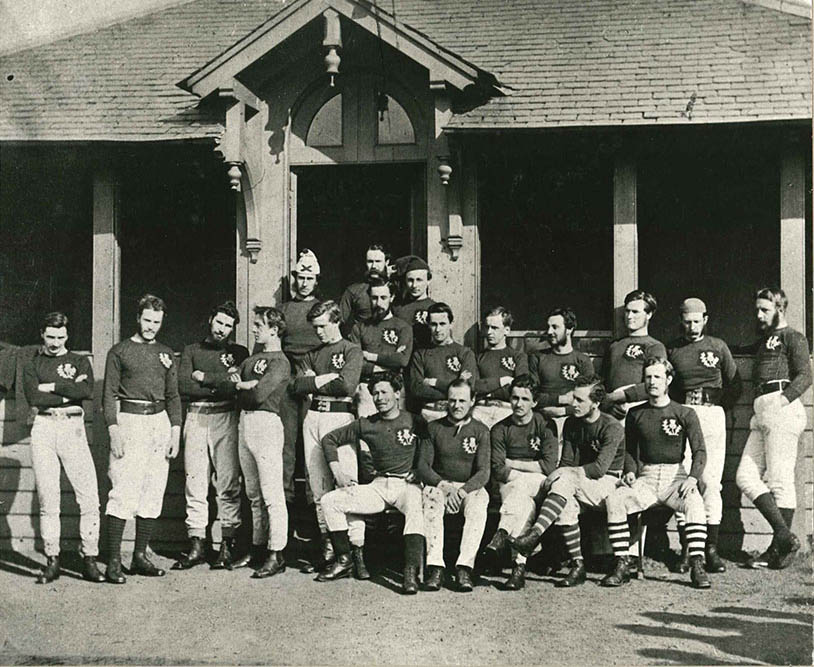
Scotland's First National Rugby Team, 1871, for the 1st international, v England in Edinburgh, Scotland won by 1 goal & 1 try to 1 try

James Finlay (8 April 1852 – 25 January 1930) was a Scotland international rugby union player.

== Rugby Union career ==
=== Amateur career ===
Finlay played for Edinburgh Academicals.

=== Provincial career ===
Finlay was capped for Edinburgh District, playing in the very first inter-city match in 1872; and captained the side in 1874.

=== International career ===
Finlay was capped four times for Scotland between 1871 and 1875, including the first ever international. He also played for Edinburgh Academicals.

== Family ==
He was the brother of Arthur Finlay and Ninian Finlay who were also capped for Scotland. They all appeared together once in 1875, in the 0–0 draw against England at Raeburn Place: James winning the last of his four caps, while Arthur and Ninian gained their first caps.
