= Thomas Batson =

English rugby union player

- Born: Thomas Batson; 1846 Ross
- Died: 5 February 1933 (aged 86–87) (registered in) Battersea (aged 87 years days)

Rugby union career
- Position: Forward
Amateur team(s)
Years	Team	Apps	(Points)
-	Blackheath FC		
International career
Years	Team	Apps	(Points)
1872–1875	England	3	

Thomas Batson was a rugby union international who represented England from 1872 to 1875.

== Early life ==
Thomas Batson was born on 1846 in Ross.

== Rugby union career ==
Batson made his international debut on 5 February 1872 at The Oval in the England vs Scotland match. Of the three matches he played for his national side he was on the winning side on three occasions. He played his final match for England on 15 February 1875 at The Oval in the England vs Ireland match.
