= Thomas Annandale =

Scottish surgeon (1838–1907)

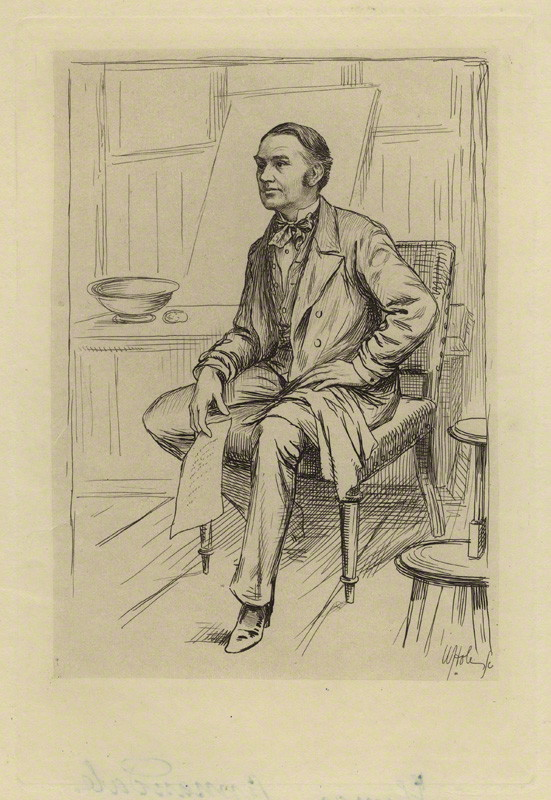
Thomas Annandale, 1884 engraving by William Brassey Hole

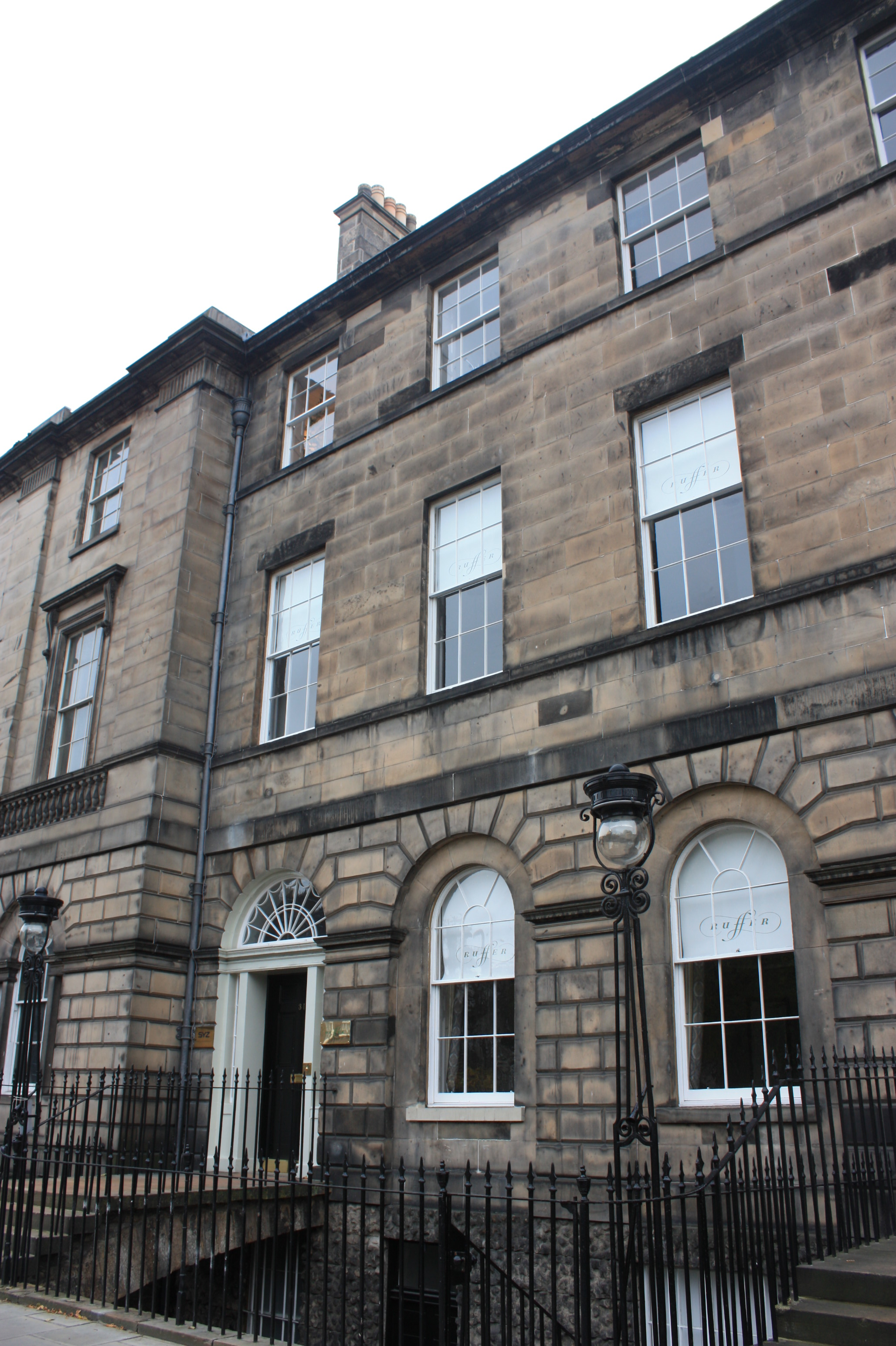
Annandale's house at 31 Charlotte Square, Edinburgh

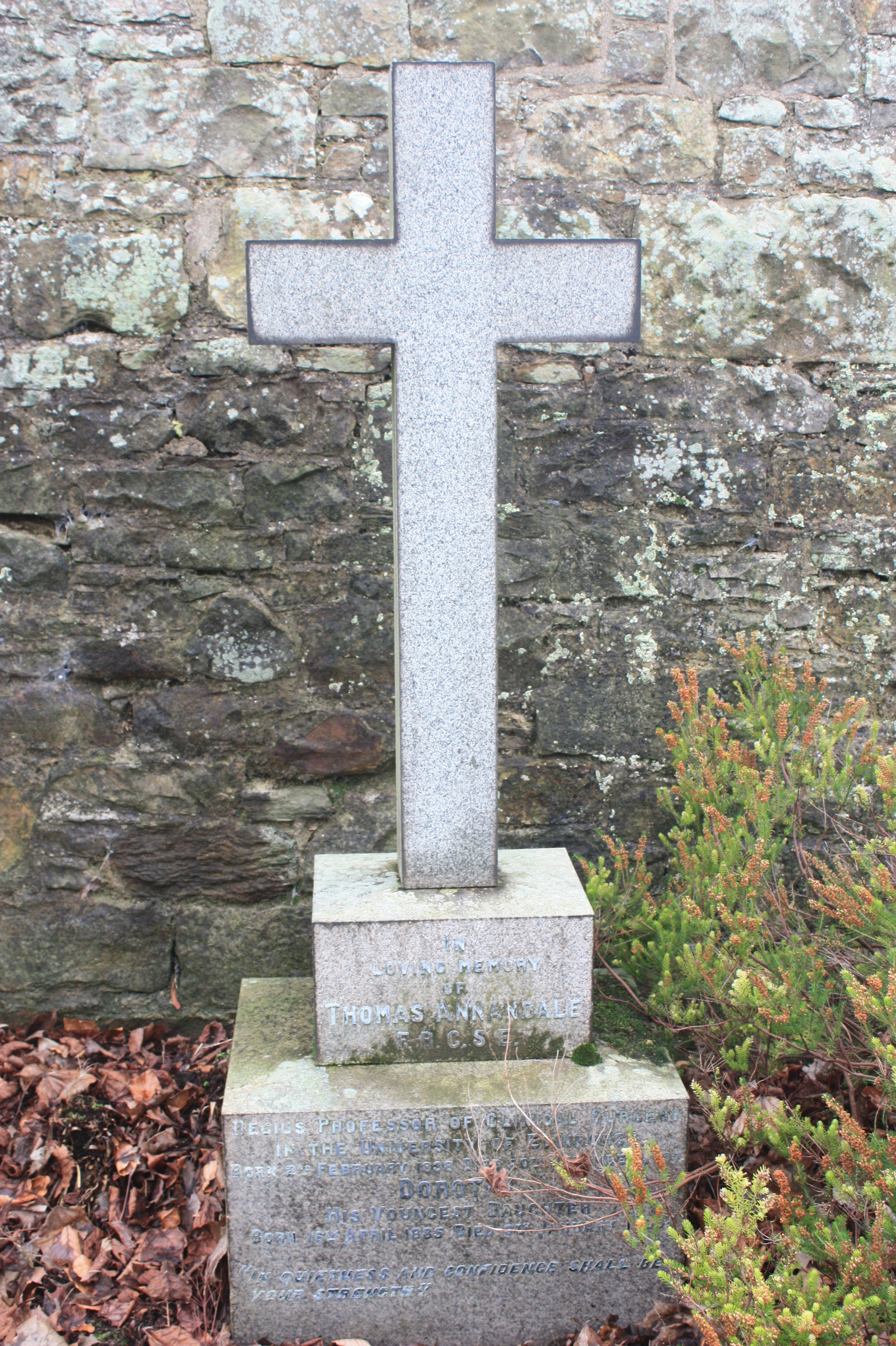
The grave of Thomas Annandale, Dean Cemetery

Thomas Annandale, FRCS FRSE (1838–1907) was a British surgeon who conducted the first repair of the meniscus and the first successful removal of an acoustic neuroma, and introduced the pre-peritoneal approach to inguinal hernia repair. He served as Regius Professor of Clinical Surgery at the University of Edinburgh. His collection of anatomical specimens was donated to the Surgeon's Hall in Edinburgh and is now known as the Thomas Annandale Collection.

== Life ==
Born in Newcastle-upon-Tyne on 2 February 1838, he was third son of Thomas Annandale, surgeon, by his wife Elizabeth Johnston. He was educated at Bruce's Academy in Newcastle, and then apprenticed to his father. Continuing medical studies at Newcastle Infirmary, he matriculated in 1856 at Edinburgh University Medical School, and graduated M.D. in 1860 with the highest honours, receiving the gold medal for his thesis On the Injuries and Diseases of the Hip Joint.

Annandale was appointed in 1860 house-surgeon to James Syme at the Edinburgh Royal Infirmary, and was Syme's private assistant from 1861 to 1870. In 1863 he was admitted Fellow of the Royal College of Surgeons of Edinburgh, and became a junior demonstrator of anatomy in the university under John Goodsir. He was also appointed in 1863 a lecturer on the principles of surgery in the Edinburgh Extramural School of Medicine, and gave there a course of lectures yearly until 1871, when he began to lecture on clinical surgery at the Royal Infirmary. Annandale was admitted a member of the Royal College of Surgeons of England, on 15 July 1859, and Fellow on 12 April 1888; in 1864 he won the Jacksonian prize for his dissertation on The malformations, diseases and injuries of the fingers and toes, with their surgical treatment (Edinburgh 1865).

Appointed assistant surgeon to the Royal Infirmary at Edinburgh in 1865, and acting surgeon there in 1871, Annandale became regius professor of clinical surgery in the University of Edinburgh in 1877, in succession to Joseph Lister, who then moved to King's College London.

He was elected a Fellow of the Royal Society of Edinburgh in 1867. In 1872 Annandale was elected a member of the Harveian Society of Edinburgh and served as president in 1900. In 1886 he was elected a member of the Aesculapian Club. He was made honorary D.C.L. of the University of Durham in April 1902, and was surgeon-general to the Royal Company of Archers, from 27 May 1900 until his death. He joined as an archer in 1870.

The newly graduated Richard James Arthur Berry came to work under him, as House Surgeon in the Royal Infirmary, in 1891.

In his final years Annandale is listed as living at 31 Charlotte Square, one of Edinburgh's most prestigious addresses.

Annandale died suddenly on 20 December 1907, having operated as usual at the Royal Infirmary on the previous day. He was buried in the Dean Cemetery in western Edinburgh. The grave lies in the northern section, backing onto the dividing wall to the original cemetery.

== Recognition ==
The Annandale gold medal in clinical surgery was founded in his memory at Edinburgh university.

== Works ==
Annandale published at Edinburgh, with papers in professional periodicals:

- Surgical Appliances and Minor Operative Surgery, 1866.
- Abstracts of Surgical Principles, 6 pts. 1868–70 (3rd ed 1878).
- Observations and Cases in Surgery, 1875.
- On the Pathology and Operative Treatment of Hip Disease, 1876.

== Family ==
Annandale married in 1874 Eveline Nelson, the eldest daughter of William Nelson, an Edinburgh publisher, and the Son of Thomas Nelson & Sons. They had a family of three sons and three daughters.

Their eldest son, Thomas Nelson Annandale became a famous zoologist.

Annandale's great-granddaughter is Samoan doctor Viopapa Annandale–Atherton.

== Notes ==
Attribution

This article incorporates text from a publication now in the public domain: Stephen, Leslie, ed. (1885). "Annandale, Thomas". Dictionary of National Biography. Vol. 1. London: Smith, Elder & Co.
