= Mundla Chand =

- village
- Location within Madhya Pradesh Location within India
- Coordinates: 23.691292°N 77.633313°E
- Country: India
- State: Madhya Pradesh
- District: Bhopal
- Tehsil: Berasia

Population (2011)
  - Total: 503
- Time zone: UTC+5:30 (IST)
- ISO 3166 code: MP-IN
- Census code: 482175

Mundla Chand is a village in the Bhopal district of Madhya Pradesh, India. It is located in the Berasia tehsil.

== Demographics ==
According to the 2011 census of India, Mundla Chand has 95 households. The effective literacy rate (i.e. the literacy rate of population excluding children aged 6 and below) is 85.3%.

Demographics (2011 Census)
	Total	Male	Female
Population	503	280	223
Children aged below 6 years	54	29	25
Scheduled caste	126	69	57
Scheduled tribe	0	0	0
Literates	383	241	142
Workers (all)	243	137	106
Main workers (total)	78	72	6
Main workers: Cultivators	63	59	4
Main workers: Agricultural labourers	11	10	1
Main workers: Household industry workers	1	1	0
Main workers: Other	3	2	1
Marginal workers (total)	165	65	100
Marginal workers: Cultivators	59	12	47
Marginal workers: Agricultural labourers	103	50	53
Marginal workers: Household industry workers	1	1	0
Marginal workers: Others	2	2	0
Non-workers	260	143	117
