= Gilbert Heron =

Scotland international rugby union player

- Born: Gilbert Heron; 6 September 1854 Glasgow, Scotland
- Died: 18 March 1876 (aged 21) Silchar, India

Rugby union career
- Position: Forwards
Amateur team(s)
| Years | Team | Apps | (Points) |
- Glasgow Academicals
Provincial / State sides
| Years | Team | Apps | (Points) |
- Glasgow District
International career
| Years | Team | Apps | (Points) |
| 1874–75 | Scotland | 2 | (0) |

Gilbert Heron sometimes as Gilbert Haron (6 September 1854 – 18 March 1876) was a Scottish international rugby union player. He played as a forward.

He played for Glasgow Academicals, one of the top teams in Scotland at the time.

He was called up for the Glasgow District side for the 1874 provincial match against Edinburgh District on 5 December 1874.

He was called up to the Scotland squad in February 1874 and played England at The Oval on 23 February 1874.

A year later he was called up to an 8 March 1875 match against England in Raeburn Place, Edinburgh.
