= James Cholmeley Russell =

James Cholmeley Russell (26 June 1841 – 29 August 1912) was a barrister, financier, property developer, and railway entrepreneur. He was a key shareholder, and eventually receiver, of the North Wales Narrow Gauge Railways Company from which the Welsh Highland Railway ultimately emerged. He was a business associate of the engineer, Sir James Weeks Szlumper. Russell was involved at one time or another with various other railway schemes including the Manchester and Milford Railway and the Vale of Rheidol. He was an alumnus of Harrow School (1855–1859) and a graduate (1864) of Magdalen College, Oxford.
