= John Arthur (rugby union) =

Scotland international rugby union player

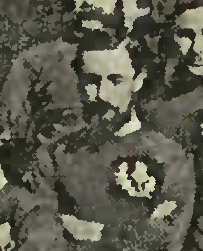
- Born: John William Arthur; 25 April 1848 Glasgow, Scotland
- Died: 15 March 1921 (aged 72) St Jean-de-Luz, France (aged 73 years days)

Rugby union career
- Position: Halfback
Amateur team(s)
Years	Team	Apps	(Points)
- Glasgow Academicals
Provincial / State sides
Years	Team	Apps	(Points)
- Glasgow District
International career
Years	Team	Apps	(Points)
1871–1872	Scotland	2	

John William Arthur (1848-1921) was a Scottish rugby football player.

== Rugby career ==
John W. Arthur represented Scotland in 1871 in the first international match. He was capped again on the return fixture the following year. He also played for Glasgow Academicals.

== Family ==
He was the brother of Sir Allan Arthur, who was also capped for Scotland.

His son, Dr. J. W. Arthur, played for London Scottish, and was later ordained as a missionary to go to British South Africa.
