= William Hamilton Kidston =

Scotland international rugby union player

- Born: William Hamilton Kidston; 29 April 1852 Glasgow, Scotland
- Died: 4 June 1929 (aged 77) Falmouth, England

Rugby union career
- Position: Half back
Amateur team(s)
Years	Team	Apps	(Points)
- West of Scotland
Provincial / State sides
Years	Team	Apps	(Points)
- Glasgow District
International career
Years	Team	Apps	(Points)
1874	Scotland	1	(0)

4th President of the Scottish Rugby Union
- In office 1876–1877
- Preceded by: Benjamin Blyth II
- Succeeded by: John Chiene

William Kidston (29 April 1852 – 4 June 1929) was a Scotland international rugby union player. He could play as a half-back or three-quarters.

== Rugby Union career ==
=== Amateur career ===
He played for West of Scotland, one of the top teams in Scotland at the time.

=== Provincial career ===
He was called up for the Glasgow District side for the world's first provincial match, the 'inter-city' against Edinburgh District on 23 November 1872.

=== International career ===
He was called up to the Scotland squad in February 1874 and played England at The Oval on 23 February 1874.

== Football career ==
He played for Glasgow Wanderers in 1873.

== Other interests ==
Active in many sports including golf, curling and bowls, especially in his hometown of Helensburgh, as a founder of the golf club; a club president of the bowling club; and a member of the curling club. He was a noted businessman and philanthropist and was involved in funding the Helensburgh Town Mission. A chairman of A.G. Kidston & Co. - an iron and steel merchant firm - he later became involved in insurance and banking. The Prime Minister Bonar Law was his cousin.

He was a client of Charles Rennie Mackintosh, whom he commissioned to build the Helensburgh Conservative Club building.
