= Thomas Chalmers (rugby) =

Scotland international rugby union player

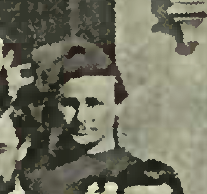
- Born: 19 March 1850 Glasgow, Scotland
- Died: 25 May 1926 (aged 76) Glasgow, Scotland
- Occupation: Stockbroker

Rugby union career
- Position: Fullback
Amateur team(s)
Years	Team	Apps	(Points)
- Glasgow Academicals
Provincial / State sides
Years	Team	Apps	(Points)
- Glasgow District
-	West of Scotland District		
International career
Years	Team	Apps	(Points)
- Scotland

Thomas Chalmers (19 March 1850 – 25 May 1926) was a Scottish international rugby and cricket player.

== Biography ==
Thomas Chalmers was born in Glasgow, the son of a merchant draper. He married Marion Dun Carrick, sister of the famed James Stewart Carrick, in 1883 and they had one son, Archibald Patrick Chalmers, born in 1888. Thomas Chalmers died in Glasgow in 1926.

== Rugby ==
One of the earliest Scottish players, he is sometimes considered the first great Scottish rugby fullback. He played in the first six international test matches, all of them against England, between 1871 and 1876, including Scotland's very first match. He was a solid tackler, good kicker and handy dribbler (a tactic of the time). He played club rugby for the Glasgow Academicals, which was the strongest club in Scotland at the time.

He played in the world's first inter-district provincial match on 23 November 1872. Chalmers represented Glasgow District in their match against Edinburgh District on that date.

In October 1872, Chalmers took part in a trial match for the Scotland team for the first association football international match against England and was named in the list of 17 possible players. Chalmers was praised as "a capital goalkeeper, albeit the rules were new to him." In the event, the entire Scottish team was made up of members of the Queen's Park club.

He also represented the West of Scotland District.

He was a cousin of the Neilson brothers, who played for Scotland and then became Presidents of the SRU (then the Scottish Football Union) and his nephew John Knox played in the 1903 Triple Crown winning rugby team.

== Cricket ==
He also represented Scotland at cricket. He was an excellent batsman and a good medium paced bowler. On one occasion playing for West of Scotland against Australia in 1878 he scored 38 against the bowling of Fred Spofforth, Garrett and others.

== See also ==
- List of Scottish cricket and rugby union players
