= William Davie Brown =

Scotland rugby union player (1852–1876)

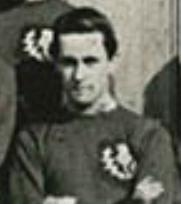
- Born: William Davie Brown; 29 May 1852 Glasgow, Scotland
- Died: 24 March 1876 (aged 23) Blantyre, South Lanarkshire, Scotland

Rugby union career
- Position: Fullback
Amateur team(s)
Years	Team	Apps	(Points)
- Glasgow Academicals
Provincial / State sides
Years	Team	Apps	(Points)
- Glasgow District
International career
Years	Team	Apps	(Points)
1871-75	Scotland	5	(0)

William Davie Brown (29 May 1852 – 24 March 1876) was a Scottish international rugby union player. He played as a full back.

He played for Glasgow Academicals, one of the top teams in Scotland at the time.

He was called up to the Glasgow District side for the Great Britain's very first provincial rugby match on 23 November 1872. He went on to captain the side in the match against Edinburgh District on 5 December 1874.

He was called up to the Scotland squad for the world's first international rugby match in 1871. He represented Scotland 5 times in total.
