= 1877–78 Home Nations rugby union matches =

The 1877–78 Home Nations rugby union matches are a series of international friendlies held between the England, Ireland and Scotland national rugby union teams.

== Results ==
4 March 1878

England	0 – 0	Scotland

Kennington Oval, England

11 March 1878

Ireland	0 - 2	England

Lansdowne Road, Ireland

=== Scoring system ===
The matches for this season were decided on goals scored. A goal was awarded for a successful conversion after a try, for a dropped goal or for a goal from mark. If a game was drawn, any unconverted tries were tallied to give a winner. If there was still no clear winner, the match was declared a draw.

== The matches ==
=== England vs. Scotland ===
4 March 1878

England	nil - nil	Scotland

Kennington Oval, London
Referee: A. G. Guillemard (England)

England: HE Kayll, AW Pearson, A.N. Hornby, L Stokes, WAD Evanson, PLA Price, Edward Kewley capt., FR Adams, FD Fowler, Murray Marshall, JM Biggs, GF Vernon, GT Thomson, Edward Temple Gurdon, H Fowler

Scotland: Bill Maclagan, Malcolm Cross, Ninian Finlay, John Alexander Neilson, James Campbell, Stewart Henry Smith, DR Irvine, G Macleod, Louis Auldjo, RW Irvine capt., AG Petrie, JHS Graham, Henry Melville Napier, NT Brewis, JE Junor

=== Ireland vs. England ===
11 March 1878

Ireland	nil - 2G 1T	England
		Try: Gardner; Penny; Turner; Con: Pearson (2)

Lansdowne Road, Ireland
Referee: E Swainton (England)

Ireland: RB Walkington capt., RN Maiter, FW Kidd, GL Fagan, TG Gordon, EWD Crocker, WD Moore, F Schute, HW Murray, W Finlay, JA MacDonald, HG Edwards, HC Kelly, RW Hughes, W Griffiths

England: WJ Penny, AW Pearson, A.N. Hornby, HJ Enthoven, AH Jackson, JL Bell, HP Gardner, CL Verelst, T Blatherwick, Murray Marshall capt., A Budd, GF Vernon, WH Hunt, EF Dawson, Edward Beadon Turner

== Bibliography ==
- Griffiths, John (1987). The Phoenix Book of International Rugby Records. London: Phoenix House. ISBN 0-460-07003-7.
