= 1875–76 Scottish Districts season =

Rugby union matches (1875-76)

- Countries: Scotland
- Date: 1875-76
- Matches played: 3

The 1875-76 Scottish Districts season is a record of all the rugby union matches played by Scotland's district teams.

It includes the Inter-City fixtures between Glasgow District and Edinburgh District; and the East of Scotland District versus West of Scotland District trial match.

== History ==
The first Inter-City match of the season was played under the 20-a-side rules. Like many Inter-City matches before, this produced a nil-nil draw. It was noticed that this format drew fewer spectators. During the match Glasgow District's Malcolm Cross was seriously injured and had to be stretchered from the ground.

In 1876, it was realised that fewer players on the park might increase the chances of teams scoring. The second match of the Inter-City fixtures was thus played under the now standard 15-a-side rules. The smaller teams provided – as The Glasgow Herald reported – the best Inter-City match ever played; and the attendance, having dropped with the nil-nils previously with the 20-a-side format, was also boosted to 5,000 spectators. Despite the much better match, the score once again ended nil-nil.

Directly after the second inter-city match, the SRU met to discuss a fixture between East and West districts. This would be a chance for players outside the Glasgow and Edinburgh districts to play. The East and West fixture thus became the main trial match for the Scotland international team. The Scotland international team was due to play its English counterparts on 8 March 1876; hence the East v West district match was to be held on Saturday 26 February 1876.

The first East of Scotland District v West of Scotland District trial match ended in a draw; it was noted that both sides had to touch down the ball once behind their own goal-line to prevent the other side scoring.

== Results ==
Date	Try	Conversion	Penalty	Dropped goal	Goal from mark	Notes
1871–1875	No score	1 goal	1 goal	1 goal	—	

=== Inter-City ===
18 December 1875

Glasgow District	0 - 0	Edinburgh District
	Report; Report

Hamilton Crescent, Glasgow

Glasgow District: J. S. Carrick (Glasgow Academicals), J. McGeoch (West of Scotland), M. Cross (Glasgow Academicals), R. C. McKenzie (Glasgow Academicals), J. K. Tod (Glasgow Academicals), D. M. Brunton (Glasgow University) [captain], G. R. Fleming (Glasgow Academicals), S. Smith (Glasgow Academicals), A. T. Arthur (Glasgow Academicals), Allan Arthur (Glasgow Academicals), D. H. Watson (Glasgow Academicals), W. S. Brown (Glasgow Academicals), J. E. Junor (Glasgow Academicals), H. McEwen (Glasgow Academicals), T. Morrison (Glasgow University), W. Law (Glasgow University), T. F. Donald (West of Scotland), R. Hunter (West of Scotland), W. B. Russell (West of Scotland), J. Cochrane (West of Scotland)
Edinburgh District: R. Johnstone (Edinburgh Academicals), J. Smith (Edinburgh University), N. J. Finlay (Edinburgh Academicals), George Paterson (Edinburgh Academicals), G. A. Scott (Royal HSFP), J. Rutherford (Edinburgh Wanderers), James Robertson (Royal HSFP), Bulldog Irvine (Edinburgh Academicals), Arthur Marshall (Edinburgh Academicals), G. Finlay (Edinburgh Academicals), J. G. Coupar (Edinburgh Academicals), Gussie Graham (Edinburgh Academicals), J. Reid (Edinburgh Wanderers), C. Villar (Edinburgh Wanderers), A. G. Petrie (Royal HSFP), R. B. Murrie (Royal HSFP), J. G. Smith (Edinburgh University), Charles Walker Cathcart (Edinburgh University), G. Atkinson (Edinburgh University), N. T. Brewis (Institution)

29 January 1876

Edinburgh District	0 - 0	Glasgow District
	Report

Raeburn Place, Edinburgh
Attendance: 5,000

Edinburgh District: John Smith (Edinburgh University), Ninian Finlay (Edinburgh Academicals), G. A. Scott (Royal HSFP), George Paterson (Edinburgh Academicals), James Robertson (Royal HSFP), Bulldog Irvine (Edinburgh Academicals) [captain], Arthur Finlay (Edinburgh Academicals), G. Finlay (Edinburgh Academicals), Gussie Graham (Edinburgh Academicals), James Andrew Whitelock Mein (Edinburgh Academicals), R. B. Murrie (Royal HSFP), Charles Walker Cathcart (Edinburgh University), James Reid (Edinburgh Wanderers), Charles Villar (Edinburgh Wanderers), Nat Brewis (Edinburgh Institution F.P.)
Glasgow District: G. R. Fleming (Glasgow Academicals), Allan Arthur (Glasgow Academicals), J. E. Junor (Glasgow Academicals), S. Smith (Glasgow Academicals), D. M. Watson (Glasgow Academicals), H. Napier (West of Scotland), J. Cochrane (West of Scotland), T. F. Donald (West of Scotland), W. B. Russell (West of Scotland), T. Morrison (Glasgow University), J. K. Tod (Glasgow Academicals), J. J. Veral (West of Scotland), D. M. Brunton (Glasgow University) [captain], M. Cross (Glasgow Academicals), J. S. Carrick (Glasgow Academicals)

=== Other Scottish matches ===
26 February 1876

East of Scotland District	0 - 0	West of Scotland District
	Report

Raeburn Place, Edinburgh

East of Scotland District: Backs: J. Smith (Edinburgh University), J. Leslie (Dundee);
Half-backs: Ninian Finlay (Edinburgh Academicals), J. A. Scott (Royal HSFP),
Quarter-backs: George Paterson (Edinburgh Academicals), R. Johnstone (Royal HSFP),
Forwards: Bulldog Irvine (captain) (Edinburgh Academicals), G. Finlay (Edinburgh Academicals) Gussie Graham (Edinburgh Academicals),
D. R. Irvine (Edinburgh Academicals), Thomas Torrie (Edinburgh Academicals), Alexander Petrie (Royal HSFP), R. B. Murrie (Royal HSFP),
J. Reid (Edinburgh Wanderers), C. Hawkins (Edinburgh Wanderers), G. Atkinson (Edinburgh University), Charles Walker Cathcart (Edinburgh University),
L. A. Auldjo (Abertay), D. Barron (St Andrews University), H. Hill (Dundee)
West of Scotland District: James Stewart Carrick (Glasgow Academicals), Thomas Chalmers (Glasgow Academicals), R.C. McKenzie (West of Scotland), Hutchinson (Glasgow University), D. M. Brunton (Glasgow University), John Kennedy Tod (Glasgow Academicals), George Raphael Fleming (Glasgow Academicals) [captain], Allan Arthur (Glasgow Academicals), A. T. Arthur (Glasgow Academicals), John Junor (Glasgow Academicals), David Watson (Glasgow Academicals), J. S. Tod (Glasgow Academicals), McIntyre (West of Scotland), T. F. Donald (West of Scotland), Henry Melville Napier (West of Scotland), W. B. Russell (West of Scotland), Andrews (Paisley), Kennedy (Paisley), Lang (Paisley)

=== English matches ===
No other District matches played.

=== International matches ===
No touring matches this season.
