= 1877–78 Scottish Districts season =

Rugby union competition

- Countries: Scotland
- Date: 1877-78
- Matches played: 4

The 1877–78 Scottish Districts season is a record of all the rugby union matches for Scotland's district teams.

It includes the Inter-City fixture between Glasgow District and Edinburgh District; and the East of Scotland District versus West of Scotland District trial match.

== History ==
The Inter-City match was won by a drop goal.

After last season's defeat at the hands of Edinburgh District, the East of Scotland District decided to play its own trial match to better determine its players for the upcoming match against Edinburgh. The East of Scotland, at the time, picked its players from four leading teams in the area: Aberdeenshire RFC; Abertay RFC; Red Cross Dundee RFC; and St Andrew's University RFC.

The original intention was for the trial match was to be played at Guthrie Junction between an Aberdeenshire/Red Cross side and an Abertay/St Andrew's University side. St Andrew's University were unwilling to go further north than Dundee for the game; and as a result the Aberdeenshire side did not travel south. Instead the 'north' team was Red Cross with a couple of Perth men; and the 'south' team was Abertay/St Andrew's University.

In the match, C. Williams of the Red Cross/Perth side thought he had scored a try, but this was disputed and a try was not given. The match ended without a score.

The East v Edinburgh match was due to be played on 12 January 1878 but was called off the night before, due to frost in the south. It was played instead on 9 February 1878; it ended without a score.

This was the first year that a dedicated 'Trial match' for international selection was announced: a 'Blues' trial side were to play a 'Whites' trial side.

== Results ==
Date	Try	Conversion	Penalty	Dropped goal	Goal from mark	Notes
1876–1885	1 try	1 goal	1 goal	1 goal	—	
1876–1885	Match decided by a majority of goals, or if the number of goals is equal by a majority of tries					

=== Inter-City ===
1 December 1877

Glasgow District	0 - 1 drop goal	Edinburgh District
	Report	Drop: W. Masters

Hamilton Crescent, Glasgow

Glasgow District: J. S. Carrick (Glasgow Academicals), R. C. Mackenzie (Glasgow Academicals), M. Cross (Glasgow Academicals), J. K. Tod (Glasgow Academicals), H. W. Little (West of Scotland), D. H. Watson (Glasgow Academicals), J. E. Junor (Glasgow Academicals), S. Smith (Glasgow Academicals), E. Ewart (Glasgow Academicals), A. T. Arthur (Glasgow Academicals), H. M. Napier (West of Scotland), J. Cochrane (West of Scotland), J. Colvil (West of Scotland), W. M. Morton (St. Vincent), J. Fraser (St. Vincent)
Edinburgh District: E. Carr (Edinburgh Wanderers), N. J. Finlay (Edinburgh Academicals), W. Maclagan (Edinburgh Academicals), G. Q. Paterson (Edinburgh Academicals), W. Masters (Edinburgh Institute F.P.), N. T. Brewis [captain], D. Somerville, R. Ainslie (Edinburgh Institute F.P.), J. H. S. Graham, George Macleod (Edinburgh Academicals), G. Budd, R. G. Strong, J. Shiels (Edinburgh Wanderers), H. M. Davidson (Royal HSFP), R. Bone (Edinburgh University)

=== Other Scottish matches ===
5 January 1878

East of Scotland District South	0 - 0	East of Scotland District North
	Report; Report; Report

Baxter Park, Dundee

East of Scotland District South: W. Sherwell (Perth), W. Dick (Dundee Red Cross), P. L. Storrier (Dundee Red Cross), G. Paton (Dundee Red Cross), D. Stiven (Dundee Red Cross), C. Murray (Dundee Red Cross), T. Kyd (Dundee Red Cross), W. Thomson (Dundee Red Cross) [captain], J. Thomson (Dundee Red Cross), T. Luis (Dundee Red Cross), C. Williams (Dundee Red Cross), C. Gourlay (Dundee Red Cross), G. Adie (Dundee Red Cross), P. Henry (Perth), A. Stiven (Dundee Red Cross)
East of Scotland District North: J. Armstrong (St. Andrews), G. Ritchie (Abertay), J. Norrie (Abertay), M. Wright (St. Andrews), J. Myles (Abertay), Louis Auldjo (Abertay), G. Lumgair (Abertay), W. Stiven (Abertay), J. Dickie (Abertay), T. Steven (Abertay) [captain], E. Morrison (St. Andrews), J. Cameron (St. Andrews), W. Traill (St. Andrews), W. Barclay (St. Andrews)

9 February 1878

East of Scotland District	0 - 0	West of Scotland District
	Report; Report

Raeburn Place, Edinburgh
Attendance: 2,000

East of Scotland District: W. Maclagan (Edinburgh Academicals), N. J. Finlay (Edinburgh Academicals), J. C. Montgomerie (Edinburgh Wanderers), G. Q. Paterson (Edinburgh Academicals), W. Masters (Edinburgh Institute F.P.), A. G. Petrie [captain], H. M. Davidson (Royal HSFP), J. H. S. Graham, R. W. Irvine (Edinburgh Academicals), N. T. Brewis, D. Somerville, R. Ainslie (Edinburgh Institute F.P.), R. C. Strong (Edinburgh Wanderers), R. Bone (Edinburgh University), L. Auldjo (Abertay)
West of Scotland District: Robert Campbell MacKenzie (Glasgow Academicals), P. Russell (West of Scotland), Malcolm Cross (Glasgow Academicals), H. W. Little (West of Scotland) [captain], J. Moncrieff (Glasgow University), Henry Melville Napier (West of Scotland), J. Cochrane (West of Scotland), J. Colville (West of Scotland), H. Watson (Glasgow Academicals), John Junor (Glasgow Academicals), Edward Ewart (Glasgow Academicals), Stewart Henry Smith (Glasgow Academicals), David Lang (Paisley), J. Raeburn (St. Vincent), D. W. Morton (St. Vincent)

=== Trial matches ===
16 February 1878
3.30pm

Blues Trial	1 goal, 1 try - 1 try	Whites Trial
Try: George Paterson; Robert Campbell MacKenzie; Con: Malcolm Cross	Report	Try: Little

Glasgow

Blues Trial: P. Russel (West of Scotland), Malcolm Cross (Glasgow Academicals), Robert Campbell MacKenzie (Glasgow Academicals), David Watson (Glasgow Academicals) [captain], George Paterson (Edinburgh Academicals), Gussie Graham (Edinburgh Academicals), Duncan Irvine (Edinburgh Academicals), John Junor (Glasgow Academicals), E. Ewart (Glasgow Academicals), Stewart Henry Smith (Glasgow Academicals), Henry Melville Napier (West of Scotland), J. Cochrane (West of Scotland), Alexander Petrie (Royal HSFP), Nat Brewis (Edinburgh Institution F.P.), R. G. Strong (Edinburgh Wanderers)
Whites Trial: James Stewart Carrick (Glasgow Academicals), A. D. Dunlop (West of Scotland), G. A. Scott (Royal HSFP), H. W. Little (West of Scotland) [captain], W. Masters (Institution FP), J. Colvil-Edwards (West of Scotland), Louis Auldjo (Abertay), D. Lang (Paisley), John Alexander Neilson (Glasgow Academicals), Robert Ainslie (Institution FP), David Somerville (Institution FP), R. Bone (Edinburgh University), H. M. Davidson (Royal HSFP), W. Morton (St. Vincent), J. Raeburn (St. Vincent)

=== English matches ===
No other District matches played.

=== International matches ===
No touring matches this season.
