= 1878–79 Scottish Districts season =

Rugby union competition

- Countries: Scotland
- Date: 1878-79
- Matches played: 1

The 1878-79 Scottish Districts season is a record of all the rugby union matches for Scotland's district teams.

It includes the East of Scotland District versus West of Scotland District trial match.

== History ==
Due to 9 weeks of frost there was no inter-city match played this season.

The East v West match was played; in quite soft ground. The kick-off was delayed, and the players found it tough to score. The match ended nil - nil.

== Results ==
| Date | Try | Conversion | Penalty | Dropped goal | Goal from mark | Notes |
|---|---|---|---|---|---|---|
| 1876–1885 | 1 try | 1 goal | 1 goal | 1 goal | — | |
| 1876–1885 | Match decided by a majority of goals, or if the number of goals is equal by a majority of tries | | | | | |

=== Inter-City ===
No match played.

=== Other Scottish matches ===
1 March 1879

| West of Scotland District | 0 - 0 | East of Scotland District |
| | Report |

Hamilton Crescent, Glasgow

West of Scotland District: Robert Campbell MacKenzie (Glasgow Academicals), Malcolm Cross (Glasgow Academicals), P. Russell (West of Scotland), James Campbell (Glasgow Academicals), J. Nelson (Glasgow Academicals), Edward Ewart (Glasgow Academicals), John Blair Brown (Glasgow Academicals), Stewart Henry Smith (Glasgow Academicals), J. Colville (West of Scotland), Henry Melville Napier (West of Scotland), J. Cochrane (West of Scotland), J. Adam (West of Scotland), F. Buchanan (West of Scotland), Charles Stewart (West of Scotland), R. Drummond (Glasgow University)
East of Scotland District: J. C. Montgomery (Edinburgh Wanderers), Ninian Finlay (Edinburgh Academicals), Bill Maclagan (Edinburgh Academicals), William Masters (Edinburgh Institution F.P.), William Sorley Brown (Edinburgh Institution F.P.), Alexander Petrie (Royal HSFP), Errol Smith (Edinburgh Institution F.P.), Duncan Irvine (Edinburgh Academicals), J. Bannerman (Edinburgh Academicals), Nat Brewis (Edinburgh Institution F.P.), A. Ainslie (Edinburgh Institution F.P.), David Somerville (Edinburgh Institution F.P.), Thomas Ainslie (Edinburgh Institution F.P.), R. S. F. Henderson (Edinburgh University), N. G. Thomson (Red Cross Dundee)

=== English matches ===
No other District matches played.

=== International matches ===
No touring matches this season.
