= 1876–77 Scottish Districts season =

Rugby union competition

- Countries: Scotland
- Date: 1876-77
- Matches played: 3

The 1876–77 Scottish Districts season is a record of all the rugby union matches for Scotland's district teams.

It includes the Inter-City fixture between Glasgow District and Edinburgh District; and the East of Scotland District versus West of Scotland District trial match.

== History ==
The East of Scotland v West of Scotland trial match was kept as an annual event.

The Inter-City fixture was cut to one annual fixture.

== Results ==
Date	Try	Conversion	Penalty	Dropped goal	Goal from mark	Notes
1876–1885	1 try	1 goal	1 goal	1 goal	—N/a	
1876–1885	Match decided by a majority of goals, or if the number of goals is equal by a majority of tries					

=== Inter-City ===
2 December 1876

Glasgow District	0 - 1 try	Edinburgh District
	Report	Try: G. A. Scott

Hamilton Crescent, Glasgow

Glasgow District: J. S. Carrick (Glasgow Academicals), M. Cross (Glasgow Academicals), A. McGeoch (West of Scotland), J. Neilson (Glasgow Academicals), W. H. Little (West of Scotland), D. H. Watson (Glasgow Academicals) [captain], J. Junor (Glasgow Academicals), A. T. Arthur (Glasgow Academicals), T. Chalmers (Glasgow Academicals), W. Morton (St. Vincent), W. B. Russell (West of Scotland), J. Cochrane (West of Scotland), H. Napier (West of Scotland), R. A. Ker (Glasgow University), T. M. Morrison (Glasgow University)
Edinburgh District: John Smith (Edinburgh University), G. A. Scott (Royal HSFP), J. Rutherford (Royal HSFP), R. Johnston (Edinburgh Academicals), E. I. Pocock (Edinburgh Wanderers), A. G. Petrie (Royal HSFP) [captain], R. B. Murrie (Royal HSFP), Gussie Graham (Edinburgh Academicals), G. Finlay (Edinburgh Academicals), T. Torrie (Edinburgh Academicals), G. Macleod (Edinburgh Academicals), C. Hawkins (Edinburgh Wanderers), C. Villar (Edinburgh Wanderers), R. G. Strong (Edinburgh Wanderers), G. Budd (Edinburgh Wanderers)

=== Other Scottish matches ===
13 January 1877

East of Scotland District	0 - 2 goals	Edinburgh District
	Report; Report	Try: Edward Innes Pocock; Torrie; Graham; Morrison; George Paterson; Con: George Paterson; Petrie

North Inch, Perth

East of Scotland District: J. Norrie (Abertay), back; 2, H. Stiven (Dundee), half-back; 3, W. Dick, half-back; 4, M. Wright (Red Cross), quarter; 5, G. Auldjo (St Andrews University), quarter; 6, A. Stiven (Dundee), [captain]; 7, E. Hill (Dundee); 8, D. R. Irvine (Aberdeen Rangers); 9, G. Cruden (Aberdeen Rangers); 10, D. M. Barrow (St Andrews University); 11, E. Morrison (St Andrews University); 12, L. C. Auldjo (Abertay); 13, Newman (Abertay); 14, W. Johnston (Red Cross), 15, A. B Storrier (Red Cross).
Edinburgh District: H. H. Johnston (Collegiate F.P), R. Johnston (Edinburgh Academicals), J. C. Montgomerie (Edinburgh Wanderers), George Paterson (Edinburgh Academicals), E. I. Pocock (Edinburgh Wanderers), A. G. Petrie [captain] (Royal HSFP), J. Morrison, (Royal HSFP), R. W. Irvine (Edinburgh Academicals), Gussie Graham (Edinburgh Academicals) T. Torrie (Edinburgh Academicals) G. Finlay (Edinburgh Academicals) T. Tod (Edinburgh Academicals) 13, C. Villar (Edinburgh Wanderers), R. G. Strong (Edinburgh Wanderers), Nat Brewis (Edinburgh Institution F.P.)

27 January 1877

East of Scotland District	0 - 0	West of Scotland District
	Report

Raeburn Place, Edinburgh

East of Scotland District: Henry Halcro Johnston (Collegiate), J. Smith (Edinburgh University), J. V. Rutherford (Royal HSFP), E. I. Pocock (Edinburgh Wanderers), George Paterson (Edinburgh Academicals), A. G. Petrie (Royal HSFP) [captain], J. O. Morrison (Royal HSFP), R. B. Murrie (Royal HSFP), Gussie Graham (Edinburgh Academicals), T. Torrie (Edinburgh Academicals), G. Finlay (Edinburgh Academicals), J. Reid (Edinburgh Wanderers), C. Villar (Edinburgh Wanderers), R. G. Strong (Edinburgh Wanderers), G. Budd (Edinburgh Wanderers).
West of Scotland District: J. S. Carrick (Glasgow Academicals), M. Cross (Glasgow Academicals), R. C. Mackenzie (Glasgow Academicals), D. H. Watson (Glasgow Academicals), J. Little (West of Scotland), J. H. Smith (Glasgow Academicals), J. E. Junor (Glasgow Academicals), A. T. Arthur (Glasgow Academicals), H. Napier (West of Scotland), J. Cochrane (West of Scotland), W. B. Russell (West of Scotland), R. A. Ker (Glasgow University), T. Morrison (Glasgow University), D. Y. Cassels (Glasgow University), W. Morton (St. Vincent)

=== English matches ===
No other District matches played.

=== International matches ===
No touring matches this season.
