= Ian Thomson (rugby union) =

Scotland international rugby union player

- Born: Ian Hosie Munro Thomson; 13 April 1930 Edinburgh, Scotland
- Died: 22 November 2014 (aged 84) Edinburgh, Scotland
- School: George Heriot's School
- University: Edinburgh University

Rugby union career
- Position: Full Back
Amateur team(s)
Years	Team	Apps	(Points)
- Heriot's
–	Army		
Provincial / State sides
Years	Team	Apps	(Points)
- Edinburgh District
International career
Years	Team	Apps	(Points)
1951-53	Scotland	7	(27)

Ian Thomson (13 April 1930 – 22 November 2014) was a Scotland international rugby union footballer, who played as a Full Back.

== Rugby career ==
=== Amateur career ===
Thomson played for Heriot's. He also played rugby for the Army.

=== Provincial career ===
Thomson played for Edinburgh District against Glasgow District in the 1950-51 season's Inter-City match and the 1951-52 season's Inter-City match. Edinburgh District lost both matches.

=== International career ===
He was capped for Scotland 7 times between 1951 and 1953, all 7 caps in Five Nations matches. He made his international debut against Wales playing in front of a then record crowd of 80 000 at Murrayfield Stadium.

He battled for the Scotland fullback shirt with Glasgow University's Neil Cameron.

== Outside of rugby ==
Thomson worked in Insurance and worked for Standard Life. He retired in 1990.

=== Cricket ===
Thomson was a very good cricketeer. On occasion, he was the twelfth man for Scotland, but he never played for the national side.
