= John Guthrie Tait =

Scotland international rugby union player

- Born: John Guthrie Tait; 24 August 1861 Edinburgh, Scotland
- Died: 4 October 1945 (aged 84) Edinburgh, Scotland
- School: Edinburgh Academy
- University: Peterhouse, Cambridge
- Notable relative(s): Peter Guthrie Tait, father Frederick Guthrie Tait, brother

Rugby union career
- Position: Forward
Amateur team(s)
Years	Team	Apps	(Points)
?-1880	Edinburgh Academicals		
1880-1885	Cambridge University		
Provincial / State sides
Years	Team	Apps	(Points)
1879	Edinburgh District		
1880	East of Scotland District		
International career
Years	Team	Apps	(Points)
1880-1885	Scotland	2	(0)

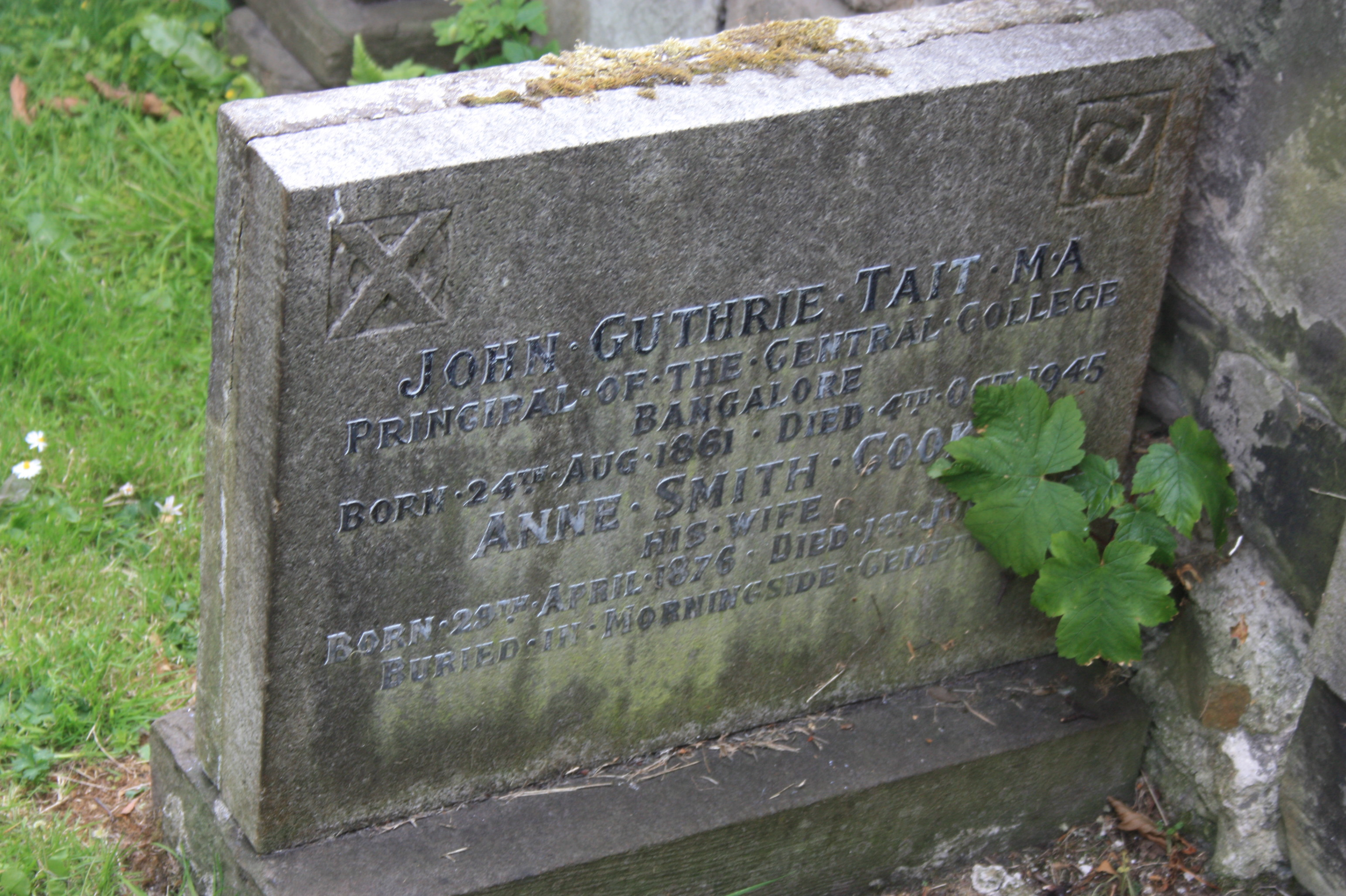
The grave of John Guthrie Tait, St John's Episcopal Church, Edinburgh

John Guthrie Tait (24 August 1861 – 4 October 1945) V.D. was a Scottish educator who became principal of the Central College of Bangalore prior to the First World War. In his early adulthood, Tait was a notable sportsman playing rugby union as a forward for Cambridge University and represented the Scotland international team twice between 1880 and 1885. As well as being a talented rugby player, Tait was, like his brother Frederick Guthrie Tait, a notable amateur golfer.

== Early life ==
Tait was born in Edinburgh in 1861, the eldest son of Scottish mathematical physicist Peter Guthrie Tait and Margaret Archer Porter.

== Education ==
He was educated at the Edinburgh Academy from 1871 to 1877 before studying Law at Peterhouse, Cambridge, from 1880. He received his BA in 1884, and on 7 November the same year was admitted at Lincoln's Inn. Tait was called to The Bar on 25 April 1888 and was awarded his MA in 1890.

== Career ==
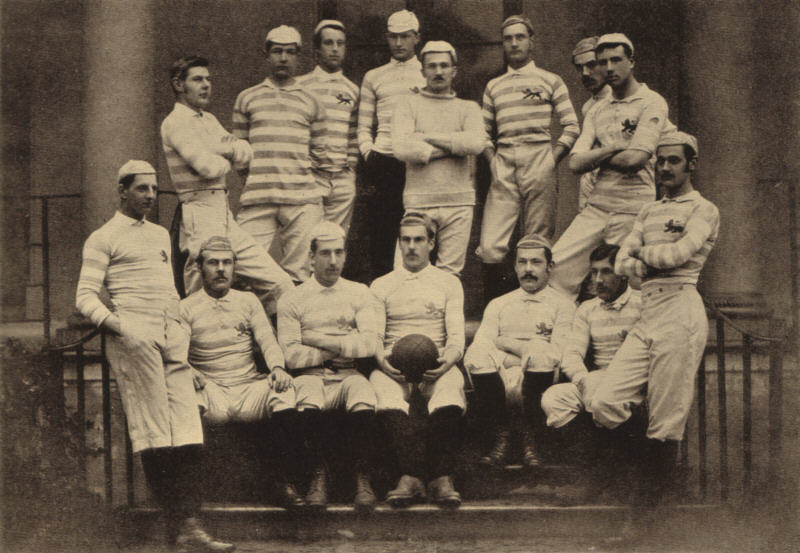
Tait with the 1880 Cambridge Varsity Match team. Tait is stood second on left with arms behind his back.

=== Rugby career ===
One of his first matches was for Edinburgh District in their inter-city match against Glasgow District on 20 December 1879. He then played for East of Scotland District in their match against West of Scotland District on 31 January 1880.

Later in 1880, he was selected for the Scotland national team, in a Home Nations friendly against Ireland. Scotland were easy victors, winning by three goals to nil; but despite the victory Tait was not part of the Scotland team that faced England for the Calcutta Cup just two weeks later.

In late 1880, now a freshman at Peterhouse, Tait was selected for the Cambridge University team. At the end of the year Tait was part of the Cambridge team to face Oxford University in the annual Varsity Match, now played at Blackheath. This was Tait's first sporting 'Blue', and the game ended in a respectful draw. Tait missed the 1881 game, but was back in the team for the 1882, led by fellow Peterhouse student Herbert Fuller. The game was won by Oxford, thanks to a clever try scored by Alan Rotherham.

Tait played one final notable game, when in 1885 he was called back into the Scotland side, to once again face Ireland, this time as part of the 1885 Home Nations Championship. The game ended in another Scottish victory, but Tait would not represent his country in rugby again.

=== Golfing career ===
The earliest thing I remember about Freddie's golf is the difficulty I had in persuading him to hold a golf club right hand undermost. Some few years ago he told Mrs. Everard that he was deeply indebted to me for licking him till he held his hands the right way.

— Tait writing from India, recalling time training his brother at golf

Tait was a keen golfer, and in his younger days he taught his younger brother, Frederick Guthrie Tait, the basic techniques of the sport. Before leaving for India, Tait entered several amateur golfing tournaments, and in 1887 reached the semi-final stage of the Amateur Championship at Hoylake; being eventually knocked out by John Ball. Although the tutor of his brothers, Frederick would surpass Tait in style and ability, and Frederick's style "...was neater, more finished, more polished, than Jack's (John)."

=== Later career ===
In 1890, Tait travelled to India and took up a post in the Government Education Department at Mysore, Karnataka. He became Professor of Languages and vice-principal of Central College of Bangalore, and in 1908 he was made principal of the college.

He was commissioned a Captain in the Bangalore Rifle Volunteers on 31 October 1893. He resigned his commission as a Lieutenant-Colonel 12 July 1917. He was awarded the Volunteer Decoration for his long service.

In his later life, Tait became a keen student of the works of Sir Walter Scott, and assisted the editors of the centenary edition of the Letters of Sir Walter Scott, and brought out a revised text of The Journal of Sir Walter Scott based on the original manuscript.

== Awards and honors ==
- In 1937, Tait was elected a Fellow of the Royal Society of Edinburgh. His proposers were D'Arcy Wentworth Thompson, William Peddie, Arthur Crichton Mitchell and Sir Edmund Taylor Whittaker.

== Results in major championships ==
Note: Tait played in only The Amateur Championship.

Tournament	1886	1887	1888	1889
The Amateur Championship	R32	SF	DNP	DNP

Tournament	1890	1891	1892	1893	1894	1895	1896	1897	1898	1899
The Amateur Championship	DNP	DNP	DNP	DNP	DNP	DNP	DNP	DNP	DNP	DNP

Tournament	1900	1901
The Amateur Championship	DNP	R16

DNP = Did not play
R256, R128, R64, R32, R16, QF, SF = Round in which player lost in match play
Yellow background for top-10

== Personal life ==
On 7 January 1904 he married Annie Smith Cook, daughter of the Principal of the Central College, John Cook FRSE (d.1915).

His younger brother was Lt Frederick Guthrie Tait.

== Death ==
Tait died in Edinburgh in 1945. He is buried next to his parents in the churchyard of St John's Episcopal Church, Edinburgh. The grave lies on the second burial terrace, down from Princes Street on the east side of the church.

== Bibliography ==
- Godwin, Terry (1984). The International Rugby Championship 1883-1983. London: Willows Books. ISBN 0-00-218060-X.
- Low, John L. (1900). F. G. Tait, A Record; Being his Life, Letters, and golfing diary. London: J. Nisbet & Co.
- Marshall, Howard; Jordon, J.P. (1951). Oxford v Cambridge, The Story of the University Rugby Match. London: Clerke & Cockeran.
