= Robert Campbell MacKenzie =

Scotland international rugby union player

Robert MacKenzie
- Born: Robert Campbell MacKenzie; 12 January 1856 Glasgow, Scotland
- Died: 26 May 1945 (aged 89) Duntocher, Scotland

Rugby union career
- Position: Centre
Amateur team(s)
Years	Team	Apps	(Points)
- Glasgow Academicals
Provincial / State sides
Years	Team	Apps	(Points)
1877	Glasgow District		
1878-79	West of Scotland District		
1878	Blues Trial		
International career
Years	Team	Apps	(Points)
1877-81	Scotland	4	((2 gls, 3 tries))

45th President of the Scottish Rugby Union
- In office 1924–1925
- Preceded by: Robert Neilson
- Succeeded by: Robin Welsh

Colonel Sir Robert Campbell MacKenzie KBE CB (12 January 1856 – 26 May 1945) was a Scottish international rugby union player. He also served in the British Army.

== Rugby union career ==
=== Amateur career ===
He played for Glasgow Academicals.

=== Provincial career ===
He played for Glasgow District against Edinburgh District in December 1877.

He played for West of Scotland District against East of Scotland District in February 1878; and in March 1879.

MacKenzie played for the Blues Trial side in February 1878.

=== International career ===
He was capped four times for Scotland between 1877 and 1881, scoring two goals (conversions), three tries, and two drop goals.

=== Administrative career ===
He was President of the Scottish Rugby Union for the period 1924 to 1925.

== Military career ==
He was a commander of the Highland Light Infantry.

== Outside of rugby and military ==
He was appointed a Companion of the Order of the Bath in 1911. Following the First World War, he was made a Knight Commander of the Order of the British Empire in the 1919 Birthday Honours.

He died, aged 89, in Duntocher, Dunbartonshire in 1945.
