= Charles Stewart (rugby union) =

Scotland international rugby union player

- Born: Charles Alexander Reid Stewart; 8 May 1860 Glasgow, Scotland
- Died: 25 February 1890 (aged 29) Searig, Dumfries and Galloway, Scotland

Rugby union career
- Position: Forward
Amateur team(s)
Years	Team	Apps	(Points)
- West of Scotland
Provincial / State sides
Years	Team	Apps	(Points)
1879	Glasgow District		
1880	West of Scotland District		
International career
Years	Team	Apps	(Points)
1880	Scotland	2	(0)

Charles Stewart (8 May 1860 – 25 February 1890) was a Scotland international rugby union player.

== Rugby Union career ==
=== Amateur career ===
He played rugby for West of Scotland.

=== Provincial career ===
He played in the inter-city match for Glasgow District in December 1879.

He played for West of Scotland District in February 1880.

=== International career ===
He was capped twice for Scotland in 1880.
