= William Penney (disambiguation) =

William Penney, Baron Penney (1909–1991) was an English mathematician.

William Penney may also refer to:

- William Penney, Lord Kinloch (1801–1872), Scottish judge
- William F. Penney (1862–1934), Newfoundland judge and politician

== See also ==
- William Penny (1809–1892), Scottish whaling captain and explorer
- William Penny (rugby union), English rugby union player
- Will Penny, 1968 western film
