= Duncan MacLeod (rugby union) =

Scotland international rugby union player

- Born: Duncan Archibald MacLeod; 12 June 1866 Duns, Scotland
- Died: 9 July 1907 (aged 41) Sitarampur, India
- Height: 1.97 m (6 ft 6 in)

Rugby union career
- Position: Forward
Amateur team(s)
| Years | Team | Apps | (Points) |
- Glasgow University
| – | West of Scotland | | |
Provincial / State sides
| Years | Team | Apps | (Points) |
| 1885 | Glasgow District | | |
| 1886 | West of Scotland District | | |
International career
| Years | Team | Apps | (Points) |
| 1886 | Scotland | 2 | (0) |

Duncan MacLeod (12 June 1866 – 9 December 1907) was a Scotland international rugby union player.

== Rugby Union career ==
=== Amateur career ===
He played for Glasgow University.

He also played for West of Scotland.

=== Provincial career ===
He played for Glasgow District in the inter-city match against Edinburgh District on 5 December 1885. He scored 2 tries in the match.

He played for West of Scotland District against East of Scotland District on 30 January 1886. He also played in the corresponding 1887 fixture.

=== International career ===
He was capped 2 times for Scotland in 1886.

== Business career ==
He became an Indigo planter in India.

== Family ==
His father was the Rev. John MacLeod (1840-1898), minister of Govan. His mother was Alexa Mary MacPherson (1838-1910). He was one of 7 children.

He married Emma Louise Hope Fitzgerald (1873-1926). They had 2 children.

== Death ==
MacLeod was shot dead in India. The Civil and Military Gazette of 12 December 1907 ran this story:

Tragedy at Sitrampur.
Murder of a colliery superintendent.
Calcutta December 10. The news of a terrible tragedy has reached Calcutta from Sitarampur.
Mr. Duncan A. MacLeod, the local representative and Colliery Superintendent of MacLeod and Co. of Dalhousie Square has been shot dead. The painful information was contained in a terse telegram from one of the company's representatives at Sitarampur received yesterday. This simply gave the bare fact that Mr. MacLeod had been shot dead by a man named Myers that morning. Mr. Norman Angus MacLeod, the brother of the deceased gentleman left for Sitarampur last night; and the funeral took place this afternoon.
The man Myers is a Eurasian, and was as an assistant of the Sodeeh Coal Company. The manager of this concern was a man named Crabbe, and about three weeks ago the connection of these men with the company was severed. Sitarampur was the head quarters of Mr. Duncan A. MacLeod who was a popular man and greatly respected throughout the colliery districts. Mr. D.A. MacLeod was in Calcutta as recently as October and was well-known here. He had been in India for about 18 years, the first portion of his experience being gained in Behar. It will be remembered that some three or four months ago Mr. D. A. MacLeod was attacked in a train by a railway thief. He was a man of powerful physique and captured the fellow. A particularly painful aspect of the tragedy is that his wife and two children recently came out on the Somali and went up to Sitarampur three weeks ago. Mr. MacLeod about 45 years of age, a man of 6 ft 6inches. and known in Behar when he was indigo planting at Dunke Lal.
