= Neil Cameron =

Neil Cameron may refer to:

- Neil Cameron, Baron Cameron of Balhousie (1920–1985), former Marshal of the Royal Air Force
- Neil Cameron (Manitoba politician) (1863–1935), politician in Manitoba, Canada
- Neil Cameron (Quebec politician) (1938–2019), politician in the Canadian province of Quebec
- Neil Cameron (rugby union) (1929–1978), Scottish rugby union player

== See also ==
- Neill Cameron (born 1977), British comics artist and writer
