= David Lang =

David Lang may refer to:

- David Lang (Civil War) (1838–1917), American Civil War officer
- David Lang (rugby union) (1852–?), Scottish rugby union player
- David Lang (screenwriter) (1913—2007), screenwriter
- David Marshall Lang (1924–1991), historian
- David Lang (composer) (born 1957), American composer
- David Lang (American football) (1967–2005), American football running back
- David Lång (born 1972), Swedish politician

== See also ==
- David Lange (1942–2005), Prime Minister of New Zealand
- David Laing (disambiguation)
