= Hugh Wilson (rugby union) =

Rugby union player from Northern Ireland

- Full name: Hugh Gilmer Wilson
- Born: 11 April 1879 Rashee, County Antrim, Ireland
- Died: 13 January 1941 (aged 61) Larne, County Down, Northern Ireland

Rugby union career
- Position: Forward
International career
Years	Team	Apps	(Points)
1905–10	Ireland	18	(0)

Hugh Gilmer Wilson (11 April 1879 — 13 January 1941) was an Irish international rugby union player.

Hailing from Rashee, near Ballyclare in County Antrim, Wilson played for Malone RFC and was capped 18 times for Ireland as a forward from 1905 to 1910. He also played rugby with Glasgow University during his tertiary studies.

Wilson enlisted in the Royal Army Medical Corps and was attached to the Royal Irish Rifles in World War I.

A doctor, Wilson spent much of his medical career as a ship's surgeon and was also a recreational yachtsman, once surviving being stranded on the Irish Sea for four days until finding his way to shore.

== See also ==
- List of Ireland national rugby union players
