= Marcus Jansen =

American artist (born 1968)

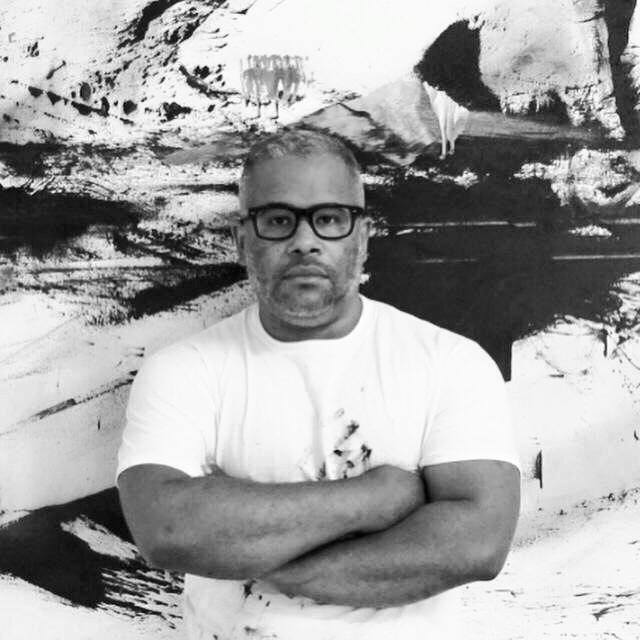
- Born: 1968 (age 57–58); New York City
- Education: Kunstgewerbe Schule Berufskolleg für Technik und Medien am Platz der Republik in Mönchengladbach
- Known for: painting
- Awards: Arte Laguna Art Prize, Venice; Dave Bown Prize, Dave Bown Projects, United States
- Website: www.marcusjansen.com

Marcus Antonius Jansen (born 1968) is an American painter.

== Early life and education ==
Jansen was born and raised in New York City. He attended the Kunstgewerbe Schule Berufskolleg für Technik und Medien am Platz der Republik in Mönchengladbach, Germany in 1985, where he spent his adolescence. The city was also his father's birthplace. After his military service and Gulf War deployment, Jansen later became an artist.

== Art ==
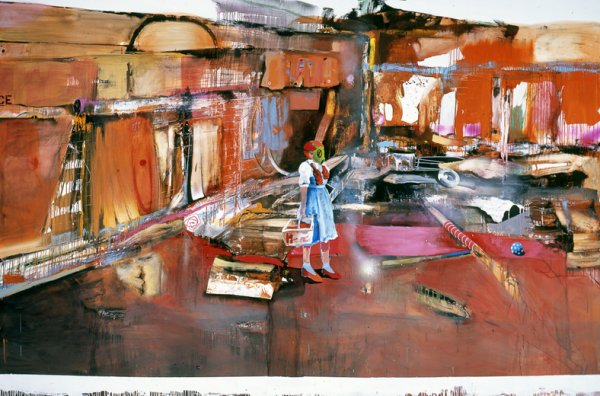

Jansen's solo museum exhibitions include the Triennale di Milano, Milan, Italy, the Museum Zitadelle, Berlin, Germany, the Baker Museum in Naples, Florida, and the Rollins Museum of Art in Winter Park, Florida.

He is represented by Almine Rech in Paris, London, Shanghai, Brussels and New York as well as by Richard Beavers Gallery in Brooklyn and Soho in Manhattan.

Jansen is the author of the book Modern Urban-Expressionism, the art of Marcus Antonius Jansen published in 2006.

== Film ==
A documentary film by John Scoular, Marcus Jansen Examine and Report, had its world premiere at the Fort Myers Film Festival, and was awarded Best Art TV Pilot Documentary by the East Hampton TV Festival. The film is available on Amazon Prime Video.

== Books about Jansen ==
- Marcus Jansen; Steve Lazarides; Noah Becker; Paul Manazza; Brooke Lynn McGowan, Marcus Jansen: Decade, Skira Editore, 2015, ISBN 9788857230573
- Cordula Gielen; Elmar Zorn, Marcus Jansen: Aftermath, Hirmer Verlag GmbH, 2017, ISBN 9783777428475

== Collections ==
Public collections include The Bronx Museum of the Arts, University of Michigan Museum of Art, New Britain Museum of American Art, Kemper Museum of Contemporary Art, Housatonic Museum of Art, Moscow Museum of Modern Art, Ulyanovsk Museum Fine Arts, National Taiwan Museum of Fine Arts, Perm Museum of Contemporary Art, Russia, Smithsonian Institution, U.S. Department of State, Art in Embassies Program, UNESCO in Paris, France.

== Awards ==
- 2013: Finalist, Fleurieu Art Prize, Australia
- 2013: Arte Laguna Prize, Venice, Italy
- 2012: Dave Bown Prize, Dave Bown Projects, United States
