= 1882–83 Scottish Districts season =

Rugby union competition

- Countries: Scotland
- Date: 1882-83
- Matches played: 4

The 1882–83 Scottish Districts season is a record of all the rugby union matches for Scotland's district teams.

It includes the East of Scotland District versus West of Scotland District trial match.

== History ==
Glasgow District backed up last season's win in the Inter-City with another win against Edinburgh District. The Midlands District were due to play North of Scotland District on 23 December 1882; but the north team did not turn up. The match was advertised and a crowd had formed at the Institution ground at Balgay Farm, Dundee. The Institution team provided a XV; and the rest of the Midlands District players drawn from St. Andrews University, Dundee HSFP and Panmure provided a XV - and so an Institution vs Rest of Midlands match was instead played.

The East v West match was played, despite a covering of the pitch by 2 inches of snow. Both teams were a man short, so the match was played 14 men against 14 men.

== Results ==
Date	Try	Conversion	Penalty	Dropped goal	Goal from mark	Notes
1876–1885	1 try	1 goal	1 goal	1 goal	—N/a	
1876–1885	Match decided by a majority of goals, or if the number of goals is equal by a majority of tries					

=== Inter-City ===
2 December 1882

Glasgow District	1 goal, 1 try - 0	Edinburgh District
Try: Lang; McCowan; Con: Allan	Report; Report

Hamilton Crescent, Glasgow
Attendance: 1,000
Referee: William Cross (SRU President)

Glasgow District: G. Mitchell (West of Scotland), A. J. W. Reid (West of Scotland), and D. W. Kidston (Glasgow Academicals), A. R. Wilson (Glasgow University), J. F. Adamson (West of Scotland), J. B. Brown (Glasgow Academicals), W. A. Walls (Glasgow Academicals), J. G. Mowat (Glasgow Academicals), B. Allan (Glasgow Academicals), D. Y. Cassels (West of Scotland), D. McCowan (West of Scotland), J. Jamieson (West of Scotland), A. Walker (West of Scotland), R. E. Beveridge (Glasgow University), J. S. Lang (Glasgow University).
Edinburgh District: J. P. Veitch (Royal HSFP), M. Reid (Loretto), H. Brooks (Edinburgh University), H. H. Littlejohn (Edinburgh Academicals), G. Aitchison (Edinburgh Wanderers), T. Ainslie (Edinburgh Institution F.P.) [captain], D. Somerville (Edinburgh Institution F.P.), C. Reid (Edinburgh Academicals), A. G. Mossman (Edinburgh Academicals), R. Thorburn (Edinburgh Academicals), William Peterkin (Edinburgh University), A. Keep (Edinburgh University), G.C. Alexander (Edinburgh Wanderers), E. Morrison (Edinburgh Wanderers), J. Greig (Edinburgh Wanderers)

=== Other Scottish matches ===
23 December 1882
2.30pm

Dundee Institution F.P.	5 tries, 2 goals - 1 try, 1 goal	Rest of Midlands District
Try: Alexander x 2 unknown F. Sharp; Wells; Con: Alexander x 2	Preview; Report	Try: Stiven; Con: Braid

Balgay Farm, Dundee

Dundee Institution F.P.: Back, Grant; half-backs, W. Sharp and Dick; quarterbacks, Alexander and Christian; forwards, G. Luis (captain), J. H. Luis, F. Sharp, W. G. Thomson, J. K. Thomson, Adie, H. Hill, E. Hill, A. Wells, P. Lowe (Perth).
Rest of Midlands District: Back, Kae; halfbacks, H. Stiven, G. Stiven, Crabbe (Panmure); quarter-backs, Stark and Braid; forwards, C. Morrison (captain), Menzies, McKerrncher, Scott, 1. Bell (St. Andrews), Hutchison, Ferguson (High School F.P.s), Dow, Fraser (Panmure)

30 December 1882

North of Scotland District	1 try - 0	South of Scotland District
Try: Adie	Report

Raeburn Place, Edinburgh
Referee: John Brewis

North: J. C. Anderson (St. Andrew's University), W. R. Sharp (Dundee Institution) and W. C. Myles (Aberdeen University) (half-backs), C. Braid (St. Andrew's University) and J. Alexander (Dundee Institution) (quarters), C. Morrison (St. Andrew's University), T. Bell (St. Andrew's University), M. McKerracher (St. Andrew's University), P. R. Lowe (Perth), T. G. Luis (St. Andrew's University) [captain], G.C. Adie (St. Andrew's University), J.K.Thompson (St. Andrew's University), P. Menzies (St. Andrew's University), T. Anderson (Perth), and F. Sharp (Dundee Institution)
South: J. Simpson (Melrose) (back), A. Sanderson (Galashiels) and R. H. Bridie (Greenock Wanderers) (half-backs), A. B. Aitken (Greenock Wanderers) and A. Haig (Melrose) (Quarter-backs), J. E. Gilchrist (Greenock Wanderers) [captain], G. Gilchrist (Greenock Wanderers), R. Lucock (Greenock Wanderers), W. Gibb (Greenock Wanderers), J. Ward (Galashiels), W. Kerr (Earlston), J. S. Turnbull (Kelso), A. T. Clay (Kelso), T. Logan (Kelso), and T. Amos (Hawick)

27 January 1883

East of Scotland District	0 - 0	West of Scotland District
	Report

Raeburn Place, Edinburgh

East: J. P. Veitch (Royal HSFP), H. Brooks (Edinburgh University), M. F. Reid (Loretto), W. S. Hopper (Edinburgh Institution) and P. W. Smeaton (Edinburgh Academicals) (quarter-backs), R. Ainslie (Edinburgh Institution) [captain], T. Ainslie (Edinburgh Institution), and D. Somerville (Edinburgh Institution), E. Morrison (Edinburgh Wanderers), W. Peterkin (Edinburgh University), C. Keep (Edinburgh University), J. A. G. Malone (Edinburgh University), G. Adie (Dundee Institution), and J. Tod (Watsonians)
West: D. W. Kidston (Glasgow Academicals) (back), A. J. W. Reid (West of Scotland) and A. P. Reid (West of Scotland) (hair-backs), C. W. Dunlop (West of Scotland) and A. R. Wilson (Glasgow University) (quarter-backs). B. Allan (Glasgow Academicals). J. B. Brown (Glasgow Academicals), G. H. Robb (Glasgow Academicals), Hylands (Glasgow Southern). Morton, D. Y. Cassels (captain), A. Walker, D. McGowan, and J. Jamieson.

=== English matches ===
No other District matches played.

=== International matches ===
No touring matches this season.
