= Greenock Osborne F.C. =

Scottish former rugby union club, based in Greenock

(Scotland) Greenock Osborne F.C.
- Full name: Osborne Football Club
- Union: Scottish Rugby Union
- Founded: 1874; 152 years ago
- Disbanded: 1878; 148 years ago
- Location: Greenock, Scotland
- Ground: Berryyards

Osborne Football Club was a Scottish rugby union club in Greenock of the nineteenth century.

== History ==
A general meeting of the Osborne Football Club was advertised in the Greenock Telegraph and Clyde Shipping Gazette of 20 October 1874. The meeting was scheduled for Thursday 22 October 1874 and to be held in the Greenock Mechanics Institute at 7pm. The club secretary was stated as A. Macnair.

Another general meeting was scheduled and advertised again in the Greenock Telegraph and Clyde Shipping Gazette of 17 May 1875. Again this took place in the Mechanics Institute on Tuesday 18 May 1875 at 8pm. The notice stated: 'A full attendance is requested as business of importance will be transacted.'

Another meeting was held on 14 September 1875 in the Mechanics Institute. Another was on 22 August 1876. The meeting moved venue to the Museum Hotel on 30 March 1877.

The club's annual dinner was held at the Museum Hotel on Friday 13 April 1877 and purveyed 'in her usual excellent manner' by Miss Ferguson. Club statements were produced and the club was noted as being 'in a flourishing and healthy condition'.

One of the fixtures of the 1875–76 season was the 1XV match between Paisley Football Club and Osborne on 27 November 1875 held at Paisley.

The 2nd XV of Osborne played Glasgow West End at the latter's Bentinck Park on Saturday 19 January 1878. West End won the match by 1 goal and 1 try to Osborne's 1 goal. It was noted that R. Steel, Hill, Forrest and Adam were prominent for the West End; and Wilson, Campell and Buchanan were prominent for Osborne.

Campbell was the club captain. On 5 February 1878 the club had a presentation for him; in honour of his moving abroad. Campbell received a valuable collection of books from the club.

The club had another meeting on 24 September 1878 in Borland's Temperance Hotel at 8pm to elect office-bearers for the new season. The club secretary signed the advert W.F.D. Office-bearers were approved and the first game of the new season was on 12 October 1878.

However, there are no reports of this match taking place; and it is assumed that the club folded at the start of this season.

== Selected matches ==
Matches reported in newspapers. Only 1st team matches shown. Osborne try-scorers noted where given.

Year	Date	Opponent	Venue	Result	Score	Notes
1874-75 season
1874	13 December	Greenock West End	West End	Loss	nil - 2 goals & 1 try	Osborne played with two men short.
1875-76 season
1875	27 November	Paisley	Craigielea	Loss	1 goal - 1 goal & 1 try	Wilson, Campell and Buchanan all played well for Osborne
1876-77 season
1876	9 December	Southern Glasgow 2XV	Berryyards			
1876	23 December	West of Scotland 3XV	Hamilton Crescent			
1877	13 January	Linside	Paisley			
1877	20 January	Craigielea	Paisley			
1877	27 January	Paisley 2XV	Berryyards			
1877	3 February	Glasgow Academicals 3XV	Glasgow			
1877	10 February	St. Vincent 2XV	Glasgow			
1877	17 February	Wanderers 2XV	Berryyards			
1877	3 March	Southern Glasgow 2XV	Glasgow			
1877	10 March	West of Scotland 3XV	Berryyards			
1877	17 March	Glasgow Academicals 3XV	Berryyards			
1877-78 season
1877	3 November	Southern Glasgow 2XV	Berryyards			
1877	10 November	St. Vincent RFC	St. Vincent Crescent			
1877	17 November	Glasgow Academicals 3XV	Berryyards			
1877	24 November	Paisley 2XV	Berryyards			
1877	1 December	Partickhill	Partick			
1877	8 December	West of Scotland 3XV	Berryyards			
1877	22 December	Partickhill	Berryyards			
1877	29 December	St. Vincent 2XV	Berryyards			
1878	12 January	Southern Glasgow 2XV	Mossfield			
1878	2 February	Glasgow Academicals 3XV	Kelvinside			
1878	9 February	Paisley 2XV	Blackhall			

== Decline of the rugby union club ==
There are no reports of any matches from 1878 to 1879 season onwards. The loss of the club captain may not have helped. The club's playing field was on farmland at Berryyards in Greenock; which was a farmstead built on an ancient fruit garden. However the site was taken over by the Berryyards Sugar Refinery.

== Other sports ==
Osborne also had a cricket club. The cricket club played at Smithston. The Greenock directory of 1876-77 states that the Osborne cricket club was founded in 1868 and gives the following details.

Ground, Smithston Park. The office-bearers for the year are as follows : — President, Mr A. S. M'Lachlan; captain, Mr John Lawson; honorary treasurer, Mr George Sutherland, Roxburgh Street; honorary secretary, Mr D. Ferguson Miller, 13 Lyle Street. Committee— Messrs Henry Bowden, William Waddell, George S. Deas, John M. Gallacher; with the captain, president, secretary and treasurer. Subscription, 10s 6d.

The Linside cricket club was playing Osborne Cricket Club on 18 July 1874 at Smithfield.
