= John Blair Brown =

Scotland international rugby union player

John Brown
- Born: John Blair Brown; 26 May 1856 Glasgow, Scotland
- Died: 17 April 1904 (aged 47) Glasgow, Scotland

Rugby union career
- Position: Forwards
Amateur team(s)
Years	Team	Apps	(Points)
- Glasgow Academicals
Provincial / State sides
Years	Team	Apps	(Points)
- Glasgow District
1879	West of Scotland District		
International career
Years	Team	Apps	(Points)
1879-86	Scotland	19	((2 tries))

John Blair Brown (26 May 1856 – 17 May 1904) was a Scotland international rugby union player. He played as a forward.

== Rugby Union career ==
=== Amateur career ===
He played for Glasgow Academicals, one of the top teams in Scotland at the time.

=== Provincial career ===
He was called up for the Glasgow District side for the 1874 provincial match against Edinburgh District on 5 December 1874.

He played for West of Scotland District in their match against East of Scotland District on 1 March 1879.

=== International career ===
He was called up to the Scotland squad on 17 February 1879 and played Ireland at Belfast on 17 February 1879.
