= Paisley Football and Shinty Club =

Scottish former rugby union & shinty club, based in Paisley

- Full name: Paisley Royal Football and Shinty Club
- Union: Scottish Rugby Union; Camanachd Association
- Founded: 1855
- Disbanded: c.1881 (Rugby Union club) c.1925 (Shinty club)
- Location: Paisley, Scotland
- Ground(s): Greenhill Park (shinty); Craigielea (rugby union); Blackhall (rugby union)

Paisley Royal Football and Shinty Club was a Scottish shinty and rugby union club in Renfrewshire of the nineteenth century. It was initially formed as a 'football and shinty' club in 1855. it is the only club known to be devoted to both sports. Its shinty arm became known as Paisley Shinty Club; its rugby union arm known as Paisley Football Club.

== Formation ==
The club was founded on 16 November 1855. From the Paisley Herald and Renfrewshire Advertiser of 24 November 1855.

Football Club.—A meeting of those favourable to the formation a football club was held in the Athenaeum Directors' Room, on Friday last. The gentlemen present were not numerous, but very respectable. It was unanimously resolved to establish a club, to be willed "The Paisley Football and Shinty Club" and the following office-bearers were appointed:—
President —Mr David Brewster;
Vice-president—Mr R. L. Henderson;
Treasurer—Mr Matthew Muir;
Secretary—Mr Jas. H. Dunn
Committee —Messrs John Abercrombie, A. Clark, A. Turriff junior, and T. McRobert.
A park, about 200.yards in length, has been leased at Greenhill, and an effort is to be made to arrange match with the militia officers and men. Owing to the little expense the club will be put to the subscription was fixed at almost a nominal sum (2s. 6d). It was agreed to commence operations on Saturday first, but, owing to the sacramental Sabbath, the formal opening day has been postponed to Saturday week. If the office-bearers go about the matter in earnest, they have sufficient influence to ensure the club's success.

Office-bearers were elected in 1856, William Murray becoming president; and John Greenlees as vice-president; John Abercrombie promoted from the committee to Secretary and Muir remaining Treasurer. Henderson drops to the committee, Turriff remains there but others are elected: Mackie, Dunn, Miller, McFadyen and another Muir.

The 'football' in the club's name is doubtless an early version, predating rugby union or association football rules. The historian of the Scottish Football Museum, Richard Brearty notes:

These clubs were all formed long before a general uniformity in playing rules existed, and would originally have played to their own individual code.

It is clear however, by the references to Paisley Football Club from the 1870s onwards that the club was playing rugby union rules.

Writing in 1898 in page 7 of the Paisley and Renfrewshire Gazette of Saturday 10 December, the columnist W.L.C. gives a history of rugby union in Paisley. He states that over 30 years ago, association football was unheard of in the town. The Paisley Football Club - playing rugby union - had its own ground at Craigielea. They then moved to Blackhall. W.L.C. notes that Paisley Football Club became defunct around 1878; however there is evidence of the club being extant in 1880.

== Shinty ==
By 1856, the club had seemingly gained royal approval. It was now deemed the Paisley Royal Football and Shinty Club. At the start the shinty club had no competition to play; and so the club divided its player squad into two sides and played their matches in that manner. The split that they decided on was that of the church; the Free Church of Scotland were one side, and the Church of Scotland and others were on the other.

Betting on the matches made the Free Church of Scotland players favourites, bookmakers giving them odds of 3 to 1 for winning the match on 22 March 1856. More than a hundred people turned out to spectate, and largely cheered on the favourites having invested in them. Nevertheless, the match ended in a draw with 3 hales each. Although the players were nominally from the same club, it was a very hard-fought match and one of the players had his thumb shattered in the battle.

Crowds watching the shinty escalated rapidly and two months later their matches were being watched by over a thousand spectators.

The shinty club became known as Paisley Shinty Club. It lasted longer than the rugby club, the Post Office directory having an entry for the Paisley Shinty Club in 1924.

== Rugby Union ==
The rugby union club was known as Paisley Football Club.

In March 1871 a rugby union match was played between Ardrossan Castle and Paisley. This match ended in a no-scoring draw; but the return match was won by Paisley by a try to zero.

In 1872 a match between the 2XVs of Paisley and St. Vincent was recorded by the North British Daily Mail edition of 2 December. The Paisley 2XV team was recorded as:- J. Pinkerton [captain], A. Abercrombie, W. Brunton, D. Campbell, S. Dougall, W. Fullerton, J. McKean, Duncan Campbell, J. Barr, J. Lyle, R. Andrews, W. Y. King, P. Ronald, D. Lang, J. Hogg.

In 1873 they were playing Merchistonians.

One of the fixtures of the 1875–76 season was the 1XV match between Paisley Football Club and Osborne on 27 November 1875 held at Paisley.

In 1876 they were playing against Royal HSFP.

Both Paisley and Greenock Wanderers had 1XV and 2XVs in 1878.

Paisley played Regent F.C. in a rugby match at the end of November 1879. This was Paisley's 2XV.

In a match of 1880 against Glasgow University it was noted that Pinkerton and Glen played well for Paisley.

== Notable former rugby union players ==
=== Scotland internationalists ===
- (Scotland) David Lang

=== West of Scotland District players ===
The following former Paisley Football Club players have represented West of Scotland District at provincial level.

- (Scotland) David Lang
- (Scotland) R. Andrews
- (Scotland) J. Kennedy
