= Thomas Torrie =

Scotland international rugby union player

- Born: Thomas Jameson Torrie; 13 April 1857 Edinburgh, Scotland
- Died: 18 June 1913 (aged 56) St Andrews, Scotland
- Notable relative(s): Thomas Jameson Torrie, father

Rugby union career
- Position: Forward
Amateur team(s)
Years	Team	Apps	(Points)
- Edinburgh Academicals
Provincial / State sides
Years	Team	Apps	(Points)
1876-77	East of Scotland District		
1876-77	Edinburgh District		
International career
Years	Team	Apps	(Points)
1877	Scotland	1	(0)

Thomas Torrie (13 April 1857 – 18 June 1913) was a Scotland international rugby union player.

== Rugby Union career ==
=== Amateur career ===
He played for Edinburgh Academicals.

=== Provincial career ===
He played for East of Scotland District in February 1876.

Torrie was selected for Edinburgh District. He played in the Inter-City match of December 1876 against Glasgow District; and for Edinburgh District against East of Scotland District in January 1877.

=== International career ===
He was capped once for Scotland, against England in 1877.

== Business career ==
After rugby union, Torrie became a tea-planter in Assam, Ceylon. He was named as a tea-planter in John M. Crabbie's will, in the Morning Post of 4 March 1898.

== Family ==
Torrie was born to parents Thomas Jameson Torrie, the advocate, geologist and botanist, and Catherine Paton Jameson. He had 3 siblings Janet, Robert and Lawrence. He married Jane Crabbie, daughter of John M. Crabbie of Duncow, the wine merchant and distiller. By 1901 he was staying in London, but moved to Vancouver in Canada in 1907. His sister Janet married Dr. Claud Muirhead; their only child died in infancy; and Janet Torrie died in 1874 and Claud Muirhead died in 1910. This meant a competing claim for their estate between the surviving Torrie brothers - Lawrence had died in 1909 - and the Muirhead family. The judge Lord Skerrington ruled in favour of the Muirhead family. Thomas Torrie died in St. Andrews in 1913, leaving an estate of £16,747 and 17 shillings and 7 pence.
