= John Scoular =

Scotland international rugby union player

- Born: John Gladstone Scoular; 27 September 1885 Whitehaven, England
- Died: 7 September 1953 (aged 67) Wakefield, England

Rugby union career
- Position: Full Back
Amateur team(s)
Years	Team	Apps	(Points)
- Cambridge University
Provincial / State sides
Years	Team	Apps	(Points)
1906	Provinces District		
International career
Years	Team	Apps	(Points)
1905-06	Scotland	5	(0)

John Scoular (17 September 1885 – 7 September 1953) was a Scotland international rugby union player.

== Rugby Union career ==
=== Amateur career ===
He went to St. Bees school in Cumbria.

He then went to Cambridge University where he studied at St. Johns.

Scoular played for Cambridge University. He was also known as Jack.

He twisted a knee in the inter-university match of 13 December 1906; and this injury curtailed any subsequent provincial and international career.

=== Provincial career ===
He played for the Provinces District side against the Cities District side in January 1906, while still with Cambridge University.

Due to the knee injury, he was unable to play in the 1907 fixture and the same injury dashed further Scotland representation.

=== International career ===
Qualified for both Scotland and England, Scoular chose to play for Scotland.

He played for Scotland five times, selected in 1905 and 1906.

In 1907, the Dundee Courier of 21 January seemed unsympathetic to Scoular's twisted knee when he could not fulfil his selection to play against Wales.

J. G. Scoular has cried off owing to injuries. Sloan will play full back. It is probable Scoular has played his last game.

Scoular was originally selected in hope by the Scotland selectors but the injury could not heal sufficiently.

== Military career ==
During the First World War, Scoular was a 2nd Lieutenant with the Royal Garrison Artillery. In the newspaper obituary of the Yorkshire Post and Leeds Intelligencer of Friday 11 September 1953, he was recorded as Major John Gladstone Scoular.

== Engineering career ==
Before the war, Scoular lodged with a Ernest Gerard Banham, a mining engineer; and Scoular became a mining engineer with the Nostell Colliery Ltd in Wakefield. He became a mining manager for the Oughterside Colliery, south of Carlisle.

== Family ==
His parents were George Scoular (1849-1912) and Janet Robb (1848-1933). They had 4 daughters and 3 sons, including John.

He married Nancy Todd in September 1917 at Tynemouth in Northumberland.

== Death ==
He died at his home in Sandal, Wakefield.

His funeral took place at Wragby church, near Wakefield; before his cremation at Lawnswood.
