= Thomas Jameson Torrie =

Scottish advocate, geologist, botanist and author

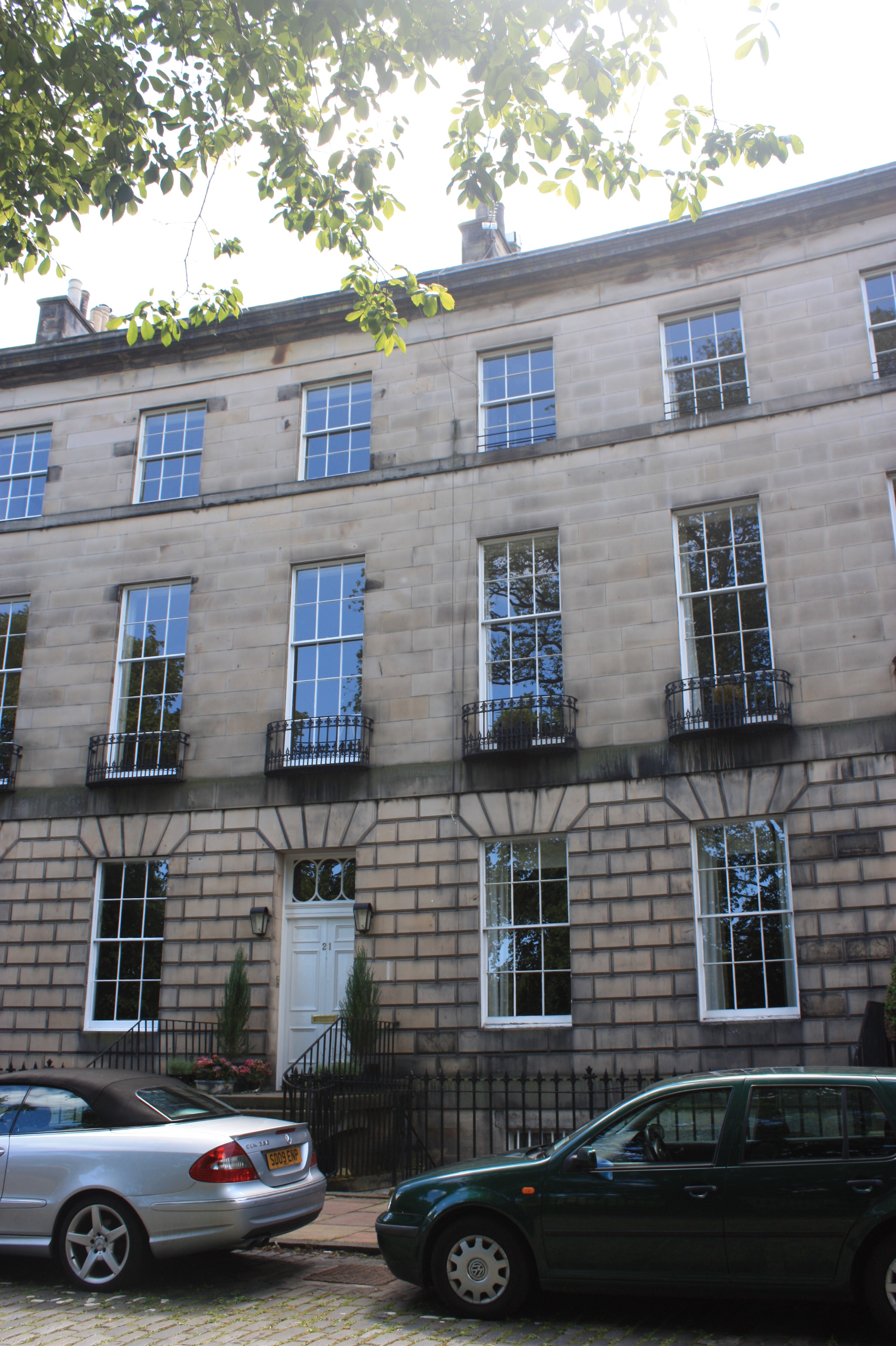
Torrie's house at 21 Royal Circus, Edinburgh

Thomas Jameson Torrie FRSE (died 7 August 1858) was a Scottish advocate, geologist, botanist and author. He was a competent artist and made his own botanical drawings.

== Life ==
Torrie was the son of Patrick Torrie (1763–1810) and Janet Jameson (1776–1853), the sister of Robert Jameson, who was a strong influence upon him.

He trained as a lawyer at the University of Edinburgh, and qualified as an advocate in 1830. However his primary interests lay in scientific investigations. In 1827 he was President of Edinburgh's Plinian Society, a group of like-minded thinkers and scientists. In 1832 he inherited £10,000, a large sum for the day, enabling him to pursue his scientific interests at leisure.

He was elected a Fellow of the Royal Society of Edinburgh in 1834, his proposer was Sir John Robison. At this time he was living in an imposing Georgian townhouse at 21 Royal Circus in Edinburgh's New Town. He also served on the Committee of the British Association for the Advancement of Science.

He visited Mount Vesuvius during an eruption, and reported his observations back to several scientific bodies.

He died in Roslin in Midlothian on 7 August 1858, and is buried in Warriston Cemetery.

== Family ==
He married Catherine Paton (1820–1867) in 1846. They had 3 sons and a daughter; Janet Torrie, Robert Torrie, Lawrence Jameson Torrie (born 1852) and Thomas Torrie, the Scotland international rugby union player.
