= George Ritchie (rugby union, born 1848) =

Scotland international rugby union player (1848–1896)

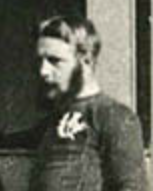
- Born: George Ritchie; 16 April 1848 Edinburgh, Scotland
- Died: 31 January 1896 (aged 47) Kelso, Scotland

Rugby union career
- Position: Forward
Amateur team(s)
Years	Team	Apps	(Points)
-	Merchistons		
International career
Years	Team	Apps	(Points)
1871	Scotland	1	(0)

George Ritchie (16 April 1848 – 31 January 1896) was a Scotland international rugby union player. He played as a Forward.

Playing in the very first international, Ritchie scored a try which was chalked off by the umpire Hely Hutchinson Almond. The resulting pressure, though, did break in Scotland's favour with Angus Buchanan scoring that first try. Notwithstanding, Ritchie always maintained that his try was valid and should have stood.

== Rugby Union career ==
=== Amateur career ===
Ritchie played for Merchistons in Edinburgh.

=== International career ===
Ritchie played in the first ever rugby union international match for Scotland against England in 27 March 1871 at Raeburn Place, Edinburgh.

In the match, he almost scored the first ever international try. He went over the try-line but a clutch of bodies were on top of him. An Englishman claimed to have control of the ball and the umpire decided it was Scotland's hack off 5 yards from the line. Scotland then scored a try and goal from the resultant set-piece; the try coming from Angus Buchanan.

It was Ritchie's only international appearance for Scotland and he always maintained that he scored a perfectly good try, throughout the rest of his life. He died in Kelso, Scotland in 1896.
