= Stewart Henry Smith =

Scotland international rugby union player

Stewart Smith
- Born: Stewart Henry Smith; 12 April 1855 Glasgow, Scotland
- Died: 29 November 1896 (aged 41) Rhu, Scotland

Rugby union career
- Position: Forward
Amateur team(s)
| Years | Team | Apps | (Points) |
- Glasgow Academicals
Provincial / State sides
| Years | Team | Apps | (Points) |
- Glasgow District
| 1878 | Blues Trial | | |
| 1879 | West of Scotland District | | |
International career
| Years | Team | Apps | (Points) |
| 1877-78 | Scotland | 2 | (0) |

Stewart Smith (12 April 1855 – 29 November 1896) was a Scotland international rugby union player. He played as a forward.

== Rugby Union career ==
=== Amateur career ===
Smith played for Glasgow Academicals.

=== Provincial career ===
Smith was called up for the Glasgow District side for the 1877 provincial match against Edinburgh District on 1 December 1877 while still with Glasgow Academicals.

Smith played for Blues Trial in their match against Whites Trial on 16 February 1878.

Smith played for West of Scotland District in their match against East of Scotland District on 1 March 1879.

=== International career ===
Smith was called up to the Scotland squad in 1877 and played Ireland at Belfast on 19 February. He was also called up the following year for the England match at Raeburn Place, Edinburgh on 4 March 1878.
