= William Cross (rugby union) =

Scotland international rugby union player & referee

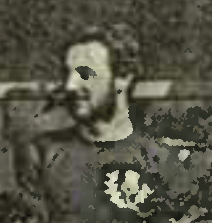
- Born: William Cross; 10 September 1850 Glasgow
- Died: 16 October 1890 (aged 40) Bournemouth, England
- Notable relative(s): Malcolm Cross, brother

Rugby union career
- Position: Halfback
Amateur team(s)
Years	Team	Apps	(Points)
- Merchistonians
–	Glasgow Academicals		
Provincial / State sides
Years	Team	Apps	(Points)
- Glasgow District
International career
Years	Team	Apps	(Points)
1871-72	Scotland	2	
Refereeing career
Years	Competition		Apps
1877	Home Nations		
1882	Scottish Districts		

10th President of the Scottish Rugby Union
- In office 1882–1883
- Preceded by: Alexander Petrie
- Succeeded by: Gussie Graham

William Cross (10 September 1850 - 16 October 1890) was a Scotland international rugby union player.

He is notable for scoring the first conversion in international rugby in 1871 in the match between Scotland and England, after Angus Buchanan got a pushover try. Cross also got Scotland's second ever try later in the match.

== Rugby Union career ==
=== Amateur career ===
Cross played for Glasgow Academicals, and Merchistonians.

=== Provincial career ===
He played in the world's first provincial district match in 1872; the 'inter-city' - a match between Glasgow District and Edinburgh District. Cross played for Glasgow as a half-back.

=== International career ===
Cross was one of the first international half-backs, along with J.W. Arthur and their English counterparts.

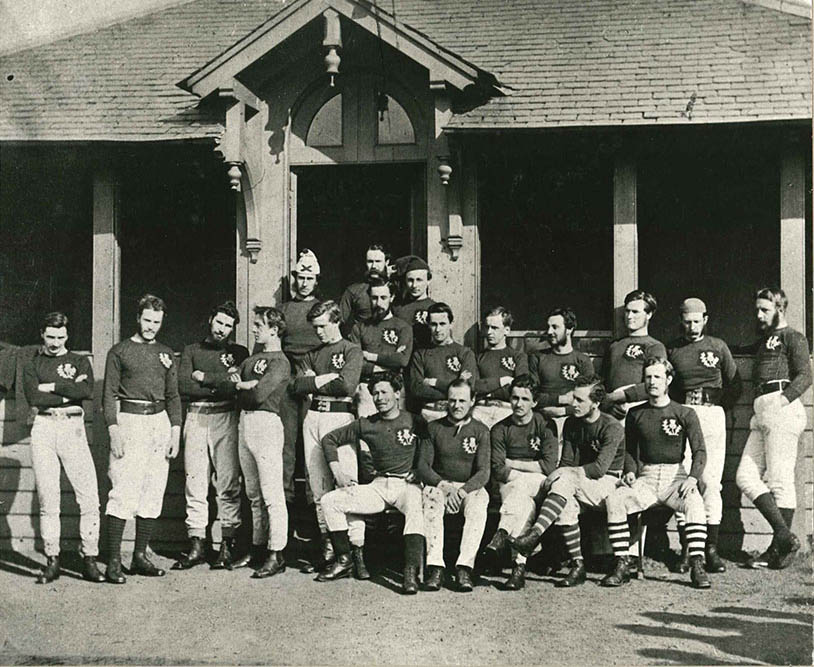
Scotland's First National Rugby Team, 1871, for the 1st international, v England in Edinburgh, Scotland won by 1 goal & 1 try to 1 try

Cross represented Scotland in 1871 in the first international match. Of the Scottish score, one of the English players wrote: "after a maul, just outside the English goal-line the umpires ordered the ball to be put down in the scrummage five yards outside the line. It was taken was out accordingly, but, instead of putting it down, the Scottish forwards drove the entire scrummage into goal and Angus Buchanan grounded the ball and claimed a try. This, though illegal according to English laws, was allowed by the umpires and the goal was kicked by Cross."

The scoring system of the time gave no points for a try itself, but entitled the side to try to convert it into a goal (one point). So Cross, not Buchanan, was the first to put points on the board. In fact, this was the only score in the match.

Cross rounded off the game with a second try, ninety seconds before the final whistle, when with their forwards running riot, J.W. Arthur knocked on from a line-out and the ball looped over the English defenders, with the quick thinking Cross picking it up for Scotland's second try.

He played one more international in 1872.

=== Referee career ===
After his international playing career was over, Cross became Scotland's second international rugby referee when he officiated an early encounter between Scotland and England. This was his only international game as a referee.

He refereed the 1882 inter-city match between Glasgow District and Edinburgh District.

=== Administrative career ===
Cross took up a role within the Scottish Rugby Union and he continued promoting Scottish rugby, becoming President of the Scottish Rugby Union for the 1882–83 season.

== Family ==
His brother Malcolm Cross gained nine caps for Scotland.

== Sources ==
- Bath, Richard (ed.) The Scotland Rugby Miscellany (Vision Sports Publishing Ltd, 2007 ISBN 1-905326-24-6)
- Massie, Allan A Portrait of Scottish Rugby (Edinburgh: Polygon, 1985 ISBN 0-904919-84-6)
