= David Lang (rugby union) =

Scotland international rugby union player

- Born: David Lang; 16 August 1852 Paisley, Scotland

Rugby union career
- Position: Forward
Amateur team(s)
Years	Team	Apps	(Points)
- Paisley
Provincial / State sides
Years	Team	Apps	(Points)
1876-78	West of Scotland District		
1878	Whites Trial		
International career
Years	Team	Apps	(Points)
1876-77	Scotland	2	(0)

David Lang (16 August 1852) was a Scotland international rugby union player. He played at the Forward position.

== Rugby Union career ==
=== Amateur career ===
Lang played for the rugby union arm of the Paisley Football and Shinty Club, known as Paisley Football Club

=== Provincial career ===
He was one of three Paisley players who made the West of Scotland District side to play the East of Scotland District on 26 February 1876. He played for the West side again in the same fixture on 9 February 1878.

He made the Whites Trial side that played against the Blues Trial side on 16 February 1878.

=== International career ===
Lang was capped by Scotland twice, in the period 1876 to 1877.

== Family ==
He was the son of Robert Howard Lang and Jane Reid. He had brothers James, Howard and Robert; sisters Helen, Mary, Jane; and a half-sister Isabella. He married Margaret Galt and they had 5 children: Robert, John, Jean, David and Helen.

== Outside of rugby union ==
He became a dyer of fabrics in Paisley's cotton trade.

== Emigration ==
He emigrated to the United States and became a naturalised citizen in 1917 in Suffolk, New York.
