= Alexander Stephen (rugby union) =

Scotland international rugby union player

- Born: Alexander Edward Stephen; 21 July 1861 Anderston, Glasgow, Scotland
- Died: 18 August 1942 (aged 81) Mauchline, Scotland

Rugby union career
- Position: Three Quarters
Amateur team(s)
Years	Team	Apps	(Points)
- West of Scotland
Provincial / State sides
Years	Team	Apps	(Points)
1884	Glasgow District		
1885-87	West of Scotland District		
International career
Years	Team	Apps	(Points)
1885-86	Scotland	2	(0)

Alexander Stephen (21 July 1861 – 18 August 1942) was a Scotland international rugby union player.

== Rugby Union career ==
=== Amateur career ===
Stephen played rugby union for West of Scotland.

=== Provincial career ===
He played for Glasgow District in their inter-city match against Edinburgh District in 1884.

He played for West of Scotland District in their match against East of Scotland District in February 1885. He played for West district again in 1887.

=== International career ===
Stephen was capped 2 times by Scotland from 1885 to 1886.
