= George Macleod (rugby union) =

Scotland international rugby union player

- Born: George William Leslie Macleod; 6 May 1858 Edinburgh, Scotland

Rugby union career
- Position: Forward
Amateur team(s)
Years	Team	Apps	(Points)
- Edinburgh Academicals
Provincial / State sides
Years	Team	Apps	(Points)
1877	Edinburgh District		
International career
Years	Team	Apps	(Points)
1878–82	Scotland	2	(0)

George Macleod was a Scotland international rugby union player.

== Rugby Union career ==
=== Amateur career ===
He played for Edinburgh Academicals.

=== Provincial career ===
He played for Edinburgh District against Glasgow District in the inter-city match of 1 December 1877.

=== International career ===
He played twice for Scotland. His debut was the 4 March 1878 match against England at The Oval.

He second and final cap was against Ireland in Glasgow on 18 February 1882.

== Family ==
He was born to Gordon Macleod and Mary Ramsay Leslie. He had two sisters: Mary Wilhelmina Louisa Macleod and Henrietta Preston Macleod. His mother Mary died when he was only three; his father Gordon died 12 years later.
