= 1879–80 Scottish Districts season =

Rugby union competition

- Countries: Scotland
- Date: 1879-80
- Matches played: 2

The 1879–80 Scottish Districts season is a record of all the rugby union matches for Scotland's district teams.

It includes the East of Scotland District versus West of Scotland District trial match.

== History ==
The Inter-City match was due to be played on 1 December 1879 but was postponed due to frost. The 20 December match ended in a draw.

There was supposed to be an East v Edinburgh District match but it was indefinitely postponed as Edinburgh wanted the match played in Edinburgh; or, if away, the match to be played in Perth with the provincial clubs to pay their own expenses. This was not agreed to and the match was cancelled.

The East v West match was won handsomely by the East District.

== Results ==
Date	Try	Conversion	Penalty	Dropped goal	Goal from mark	Notes
1876–1885	1 try	1 goal	1 goal	1 goal	—N/a	
1876–1885	Match decided by a majority of goals, or if the number of goals is equal by a majority of tries					

=== Inter-City ===
20 December 1879

Glasgow District	1 goal - 1 goal	Edinburgh District
Try: Moncrieff; Con: Moncrieff	Report	Try: Masters; Con: Masters

Hamilton Crescent, Glasgow

Glasgow District: J. Hoggan (Glasgow University), M. Cross (Glasgow Academicals) [captain], R. C. Mackenzie (Glasgow Academicals), J. Nelston (Glasgow Academicals), H. Moncrieff (West of Scotland), J. Colvil (West of Scotland), D. Y. Cassels (West of Scotland), J. Adam (West of Scotland), J. Laing (West of Scotland), D. McCowan (West of Scotland), C. Stewart (West of Scotland), E. N. Ewart (Glasgow Academicals), J. B. Brown (Glasgow Academicals), W. A Walls (Glasgow Academicals), G. Robb (Glasgow University)
Edinburgh District: Back. B. Cunningham (Institution), half-backs. J. Finlay (Edinburgh Academicals), W. E. Maclagan (Edinburgh Academicals), quarter-backs, W. Masters and J. S. Brown (institution); forwards A. G. Petrie (Royal HSFP) [captain], N. T. Brewis, T. R. Ainslie. W. Sommerville (Institution). J. H. S. Graham (Edinburgh Academicals), John Guthrie Tait (Edinburgh Academicals), J. Bannerman (Edinburgh Academicals), C. Wood (Edinburgh Academicals), E. Carr (Wanderers)

=== Other Scottish matches ===
31 January 1880

East of Scotland District	2 goals, 4 tries - 1 goal, 1 try	West of Scotland District
Try: Brown; Carr; Masters; Ainslie; Con: Masters; Drop: Finlay	Preview; Report; Report	Try: Moncrieff; McCowan; Con: Cross

Raeburn Place, Edinburgh
Attendance: 1,000
Referee: Leslie Balfour-Melville

East: A. Cunningham (Edinburgh Institution, F.P.), back; Findlay and W. E. Maclaggan (Edinburgh Academicals), half-backs; W. H. Masters and W. S. Brown (Edinburgh Institution, F.P.), quarterbacks; A. G. Petrie (Royal High School, F.P.), captain; J. H. S. Graham, John Guthrie Tait (Edinburgh Academicals), C. Wood (Edinburgh Academicals). W. Brewis, R. Ainslie, T. Ainslie, F. Sommerville (Edinburgh Institution, F.P.), R. S. G. Henderson (Edinburgh University), and E. Cross (Wanderers), forwards.
West: J. Hoggan (Glasgow University), back; Malcolm Cross and R. C. Mackenzie (Glasgow Academicals), halfbacks; H. Moncrieff (Glasgow University) and T. Neilson (Glasgow Academicals), quarterbacks; D. Y. Cassels C. R. Stewart, T. Colvill, D. McCowan (West Scotiand), S. B. McPhail (Greenock Wanderers), T. B. Brown, G. W. Ewart (Glasgow Academicals), G. H. Robb, A. H. Peterkin (Glasgow University), and T. B. Gemmel (Southern), forwards.

=== English matches ===
No other District matches played.

=== International matches ===
No touring matches this season.
