= David Laing =

David Laing may refer to:

- Dave Laing (1947–2019), music journalist
- David Laing (architect) (1774–1856), architect of the New Custom House, London
- David Laing (antiquary) (1793–1878), Scottish antiquary
- Davie Laing (1925–2017), Scottish footballer

== See also ==
- David Lang (disambiguation)
