= Angus Buchanan (rugby union) =

Scotland international rugby union player & cricketer

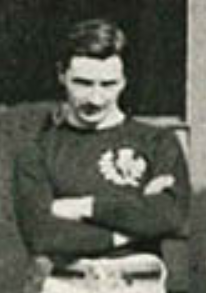
- Born: Angus Buchanan; 15 January 1847 Inveraray, Scotland
- Died: 21 February 1927 (aged 80) Inveraray, Scotland

Rugby union career
- Position: Forward
Amateur team(s)
Years	Team	Apps	(Points)
- Royal HSFP
–	Edinburgh University		
Provincial / State sides
Years	Team	Apps	(Points)
- Edinburgh District
International career
Years	Team	Apps	(Points)
1871	Scotland	1	
Refereeing career
Years	Competition		Apps
- Scottish Districts

7th President of the Scottish Rugby Union
- In office 1879–1880
- Preceded by: George Raphael Fleming
- Succeeded by: David Watson

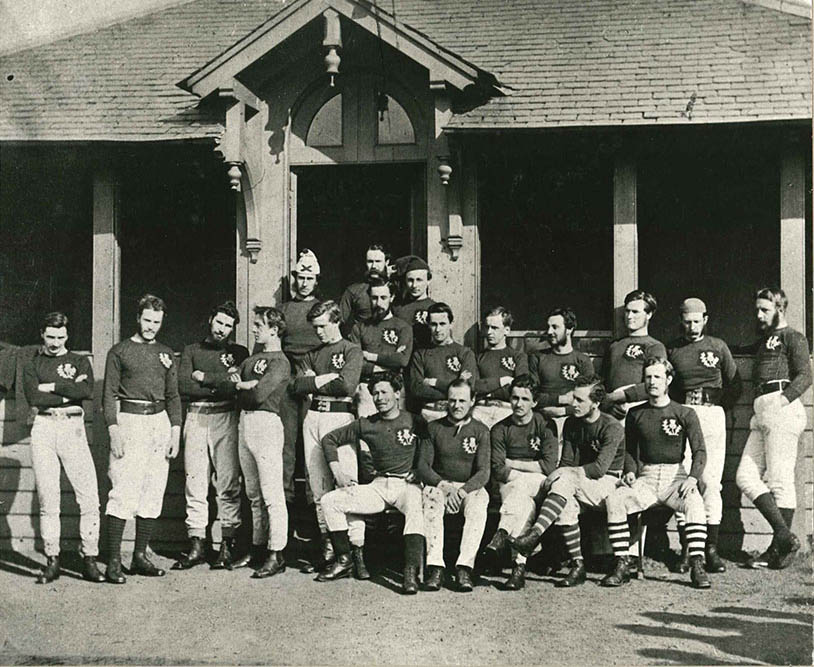
Scotland's First National Rugby Team, 1871, for the 1st international, v England in Edinburgh, Scotland won by 1 goal & 1 try to 1 try

Angus Buchanan (15 January 1847 – 21 February 1927) was a Scottish international rugby and cricket player. One of the earliest Scottish players, he was capped for Scotland in 1871.

== Rugby Union career ==
=== Amateur career ===
He also played simultaneously for Royal High School FP, and Edinburgh University.

=== Provincial career ===
Buchanan played for Edinburgh District.

=== International career ===
Buchanan played in the first ever Scotland side, and scored the first try in international rugby, after a deemed failed attempt by George Ritchie. Scotland had pushed a scrum over the English try-line, and Buchanan had fallen on the ball.

This was converted by William Cross, which created the score (crucially because it was goals that counted, not tries). The English argued that the try should not stand, but it was awarded by the umpire Dr Hely Hutchinson Almond (also a Scot - the umpires were two on the field: one from each side)

Almond made a questionable justification of his decision:

"Let me make a confession: I do not know whether the decision which gave Scotland the try from which the winning goal was kicked was correct in fact. When an umpire is in doubt, I think he is justified in deciding against the side which makes the most noise. They are probably in the wrong."

According to one of the English players:

"After a maul, just outside the English goal-line the umpires ordered the ball to be put down in the scrummage five yards outside the line. It was taken was out accordingly, but, instead of putting it down, the Scottish forwards drove the entire scrummage into goal, and then grounded the ball and claimed a try. This, though illegal according to English laws, was allowed by the umpires and the goal was kicked by Cross."

According to confirmed records, Buchanan was the first Scotland player born, in January, 1847, and was twenty four years and two months old when capped.

=== Referee career ===
Buchanan became an international referee. He refereed the Scotland versus Ireland match on 14 February 1880.

== Cricket career ==
Buchanan also played for the Scotland national cricket team.

== In media ==
In fiction, Buchanan is a part of the larger Harry Potter universe, appearing in an excerpt written by J.K. Rowling for the Pottermore website. According to this, Angus Buchanan was born in a wizarding family, but was non-magical (i.e. a Squib). Also, he is supposed to have published a "path breaking" book called My Life as a Squib, which highlighted his struggles to survive in a community which disowned him and the way he found a home in the Muggle world.

== See also ==
- List of Scottish cricket and rugby union players
