= Ian Napier =

British WWI flying ace (1895–1977)

Ian Patrick Robert Napier
- Born: 24 June 1895; Milton, West Dunbartonshire, Scotland
- Died: 9 May 1977 (aged 81); Kensington, London, England
- Burial place: Dumbarton Cemetery, Dumbarton, Scotland; 55°57′05″N 4°32′58″W
- Relatives: Henry Melville Napier, father
- Military career
- Allegiance: United Kingdom
- Branch: British Army; Royal Air Force
- Service years: 1914–1919
- Rank: Captain
- Nickname: "Old Naps"
- Units: Argyll & Sutherland Highlanders; No. 40 Squadron RAF
- Conflicts: First World War
- Awards: Military Cross; Legion d'Honneur (France)

Captain Ian Patrick Robert Napier MC (24 June 1895 – 9 May 1977) was a Scottish World War I flying ace credited with twelve aerial victories.

== Biography ==
=== Early life ===
Ian Napier was born in Milton, West Dunbartonshire, Scotland, one of three children born to Henry Melville Napier (1854–1940), engineer, shipbuilder, and founder of Napier & Miller Co. Ltd.

=== Entry into military service ===
On 2 September 1914, Napier was commissioned as a second lieutenant in the 9th (The Dumbartonshire) Battalion, Princess Louise's (Argyll and Sutherland Highlanders). On 8 July 1915, he was appointed an aide-de-camp, finally returning to his regiment on 8 February 1916, and being promoted to lieutenant the next day.

=== Aerial service ===
Napier was awarded Royal Aero Club Aviator's Certificate No. 3269 after soloing a B.E.2c biplane at the Military School, Hounslow Heath, on 18 July. On 4 August, he was seconded to the Royal Flying Corps and appointed a flying officer.

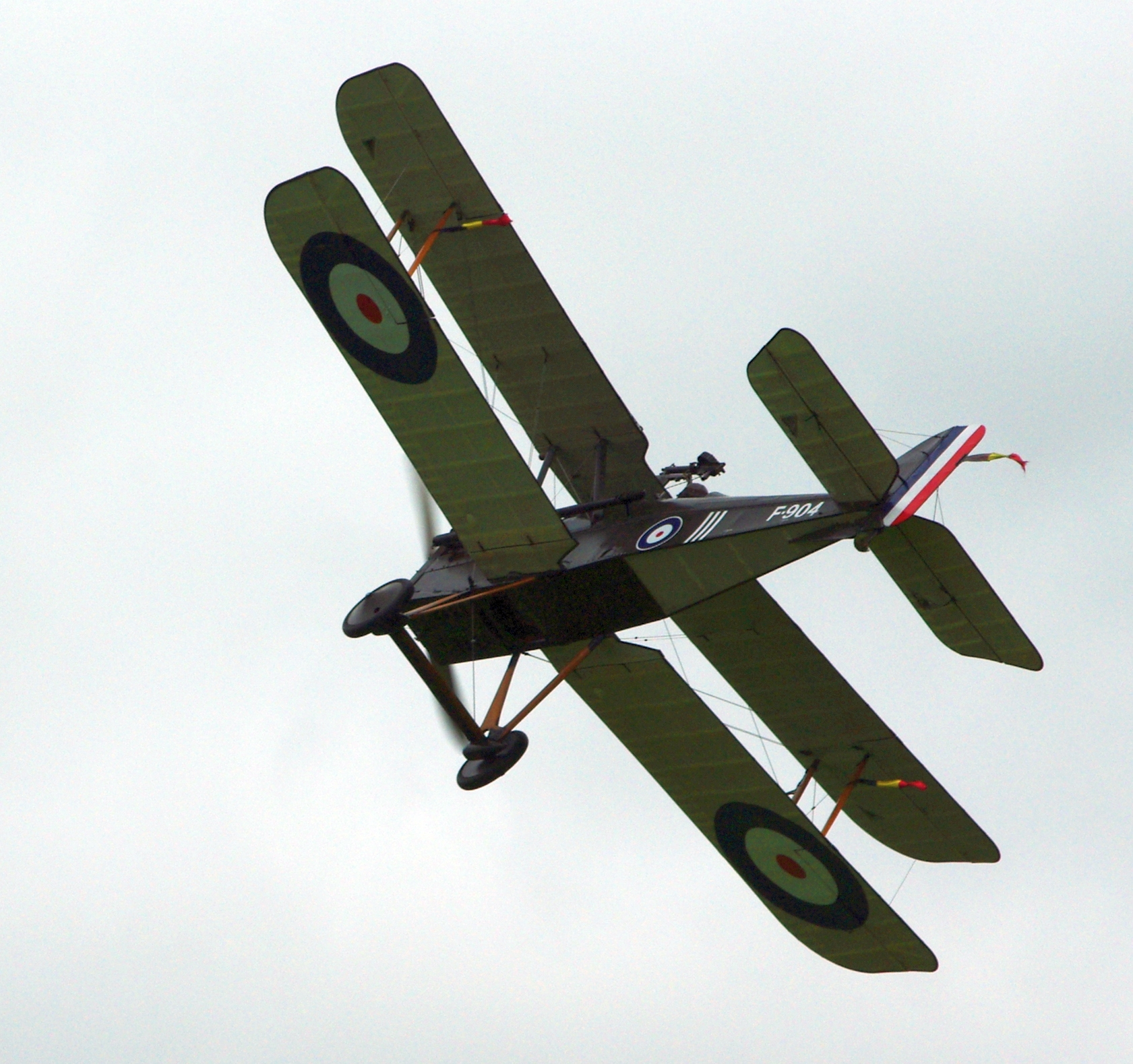
A restored S.E.5 in flight.

Napier was assigned to No. 40 Squadron RFC as a Nieuport pilot. He scored his first victory on 14 April 1917, by destroying an Albatros D.III. His second win came ten days later, when he helped Robert A. Little capture a DFW C.V. On 22 May 1917, Napier was promoted to captain in his regiment with seniority from 1 June 1916, but this did not apply to the RFC, and he remained a lieutenant until 5 June 1917, when he was appointed a flight commander with the temporary rank of captain.

Napier resumed his victory list after upgrading to a Royal Aircraft Factory SE.5a. On 6 March 1918, he destroyed an Albatros D.V. A month later, he scored again. He then accumulated victories until 4 July 1918, when he scored his twelfth. His final tally was seven German planes destroyed (including two shared wins), three driven down out of control (one of which was shared), and two shared captures of DFW D.Vs.

=== Postwar life ===
Napier then served as a liaison officer with the French Army, until on 18 April 1919, he was transferred to the unemployed list of the RAF. On 7 December 1920 he relinquished his RAF commission to return to the Territorial Force (probably the Highlanders). Eventually, he went into the family shipbuilding business.

=== Personal life ===
In 1927 Napier married Frieda Lewis, the daughter of Frederick Lewis, 1st Baron Essendon and Daisy Ellen Harrison, and they had two sons before divorcing in 1940.

== Awards and citations ==
Military Cross
Captain Ian Patrick Robert Napier, Argyll & Sutherland Highlanders and Royal Air Force.

"For conspicuous gallantry and devotion to duty. This officer has carried out many reconnaissances, and flying at low altitudes has engaged massed enemy troops with bombs and machine-gun fire, inflicting heavy casualties. He has brought down seven enemy machines."

Croix de Chevalier of the Legion d'Honneur
Awarded on 17 December 1917.
