= Housatonic Museum of Art =

Coordinates: 41.175°N 73.191°W

- Location: 900 Lafayette Boulevard; Housatonic Community College; Bridgeport, Connecticut
- Type: Art museum
- Website: housatonicmuseum.org

The Housatonic Museum of Art is a museum at Housatonic Community College in Bridgeport, Connecticut, United States. The museum's collection is displayed throughout the college campus and in the Burt Chernow Galleries, which also hosts visiting exhibitions.

== Collection ==
The museum's holdings are composed of 18th-, 19th- and 20th-century art, as well as ethnographic objects from Africa, Oceania and the Americas.

=== Selected works ===
The collection covers non-Western art: The museum's African art includes a terra cotta head from Ghana, a drum figure and a helmet mask from Zaire, a Bambara headdress, helmet mask and wood carvings from Nigeria and carved wood sculpture from Guinea. Also in the collection are wood carvings from New Guinea, and from India a bronze sculpture, a 14th-century stone carving, and a mid-18th-century painting. A Mayan stucco head and Inca storage bottle as well as a marble sculpture representing Kuan Yin from China are also among the holdings.

Works by these artists are in the collection:

- Bronze sculptures:
  - Alexander Archipenko, Egyptian Motif
  - Leonard Baskin, John Donne
  - Lee Bontecou: Seated Couple
  - Doris Caesar, Portrait Study and Wadchen
  - Charles Despiau, Untitled Head I and Untitled Head II
  - Aristide Maillol, Seated Nude
  - Marisol, Tower
  - Auguste Rodin, Movement of the Dance, Viellard Suppliant and L'eau
- Paintings:
  - Ferdinand Bol, Admiral de Ruyter, 1653
  - Giorgio de Chirico, Voyage of the Poet
  - Alex Katz, Incident
  - Philips Koninck, Portrait of a Man, 1655-1660
  - Reginald Marsh, The Chorus
  - Abraham Storch, Seaport
- Drawings:
  - Milton Avery, Sketch Class (flatbrush drawing)
  - Larry Rivers, Humes
  - Saul Steinberg, Autobiography (ink drawing)
- Other:
  - Ansel Adams, Wood Stump (photograph)
  - Marc Chagall, Esther (color lithograph)
  - Christo, Wrapped Modern Art Book (book, plastic wrapping, string)
  - Alberto Giacometti, Lust #154 and 155, (lithograph)
  - Roy Lichtenstein, The Melody Haunts My Reverie (silkscreen in colors)
  - Isamu Noguchi, Alpii (marble and iron sculpture)
  - Claes Oldenburg, Study: Soft Red Drainpipe (paint and crayon)
  - Alfonso Ossorio, Blow in the Face (assemblage of various materials)

Chernow was one of the earliest collectors of work by American abstract painter Stanley Boxer, and the museum has two of his works: Lafayette Night Bloom (oil on canvas; 18.5 x 18.5 inches, 1972) and Beach Figure No. 3 (wood totem, 108 inches high, 14 inches wide, undated).

=== Other artists represented ===
The collection also includes minor works by Pablo Picasso, Henri Matisse, Joan Miró, Mary Cassatt, Milton Avery, Andy Warhol, Robert Rauschenberg, Marcus Jansen, Tom Wesselmann, Jim Dine, Jean Dubuffet, Gustav Klimt, Henri Cartier-Bresson, Philip Pearlstein, Victor Vasarely, Alberto Giacometti, and Pierre Renoir.

== History ==
In 1967, the late Burt Chernow, an artist, professor of art and art history, and chairman of the college's art department, founded the museum. From the start, HMA's collection has been made up of gifts from artists, private collectors, commercial galleries and groups such as the student government. During Chernow's career at the college, the museum had amassed 4,000 objects.

In the museum's first 14 years, it had no paid, professional staff, acquisitions budget or the usual professional facilities, relying instead on volunteers and the use of existing space in the college. "Occasional and usually rushed visits to a gallery or museum, or the use of slides or other reproductions, never really equal daily unhurried contacts with works of art, in which students can see true color, sixe and texture in a familiar college setting," Chernow wrote in 1980. Robbin Zella became director in the late 1990s. Since 2000, the museum has hosted traveling exhibits on Rembrandt prints, Ansel Adams photographs and Frank Warren's "PostSecret" postcards.
