= Ardrossan Castle Foot-Ball Club =

Scottish former rugby union club, based in Ardrossan

(Scotland) Ardrossan Castle Foot-Ball Club
- Full name: Ardrossan Castle Foot-Ball Club
- Union: Scottish Rugby Union
- Founded: 1870
- Disbanded: c. 1889
- Location: Ardrossan, Scotland
- Ground(s): Practice Ground; Castle Ground

Ardrossan Castle Foot-Ball Club was a Scottish rugby union club in North Ayrshire of the nineteenth century.

== Founded ==
Its first match was played on 17 September 1870. The Ardrossan and Saltcoats Herald of the same date stating:

This game is rather exciting and amusing both for players and spectators, not to speak of the novelty of the game in this district we have no doubt that many who have never seen football played properly will avail themselves of this opportunity.

The club took an advert out on the first page of that paper, near the top of the page. It stated:

Members of the Ardrossan Castle Foot-Ball Club are requested to meet on the Practice Ground (Head of Glasgow Street) today at 3pm precisely to take part in the opening game of this club.

== History ==
Rugby union in Ardrossan evidently was on the rise - as within a month of the Castle side's first match, another Ardrossan rugby union side became its main rival. Simply known as Ardrossan, this side had played Ardrossan Castle on the 24th September 1870 and had a re-match on 1 October 1870. The Castle side were now playing on the Castle ground. The first match is noted as being played over a two-hour period, divided into four half-hours. There was no scoring for the first hour but McAusland scored a try for Castle; and Hughes scored a try for Ardrossan; more crucially for the scoring at the time both conversions were good. Brown got another try for Castle but the goal attempt was missed. In the fourth half-hour, the Castle scored another try through Shaw. The conversion not recorded was obviously successful as the newspaper reports that Castle won the match by a goal.

In March 1871 a rugby union match was played between Ardrossan Castle and Paisley. This match ended in a no-scoring draw; but the return match was won by Paisley by a try to zero.

It is likely that the club folded by 1889; when the lack of sports grounds available to Ardrossan sides had put paid to their existence.

== Other sports ==
The Ardrossan Castle name was used for other sports notably cricket and curling. The Ardrossan Castle Cricket Club was defunct by 1889; as noted by the response in the Irvine Times of Friday 10 May 1889. The club was sent a challenge by Beith Cricket Club for a match but the club could no longer fulfil the fixture. The cricket club blamed a lack of a sports field for the match; which they stated had affected all the sports of the town. 'There is no place available for sports' it lamented. The columnist hoped that if a suitable sports field was secured remnants of the Ardrossan Castle side and the Parkend side - evidently also defunct - might join as a new viable team.

The Ardrossan Castle Curling Club was evidently more successful. The Royal Caledonian Curling Society admitted them as members in January 1850. The newspaper reports that the Bonspeil was in Lochwinnoch, and that the laird did not let them use the Castle Semple Loch; and that they had to use the Barr Loch instead about a mile away to the south-west of the town. Ardrossan Castle fielded a curling side until 1958.

A much later Ardrossan Castle playing association football seems unconnected. This was the name of a local Under 16 side.
