= Warriston RFC =

Defunct Scottish rugby union club, based in Edinburgh

(Scotland) Warriston RFC
- Full name: Warriston RFC
- Union: Scottish Rugby Union
- Founded: 1872
- Disbanded: 1939; 86 years ago
- Location: Edinburgh, Scotland
- Ground(s): Warriston Park

Warriston RFC was a Scottish rugby union club in Edinburgh of the nineteenth and twentieth centuries.

== Founded ==
The club was in operation in season 1872- 1873; when they were originally known as Warriston Wanderers.

They were then known as Warriston Football Club; but by 1911 they were called Warriston Rugby Football Club.

For the opening of the 1874–75 season, it was remarked by The Scotsman newspaper that the club had lost their captain G. Couper, the half-back, who was capped by Edinburgh District in 1873. Couper had moved abroad. They note that he would not easily be replaced. The club had also lost Wren, a forward. The club's new captain was to be R. C. Johnston; and the secretary would be W. P. Johnston.

== Decline ==
By 1937–38 season it was still fielding a Sevens side. In season 1938-39 it was still fielding a XV team. However, there are no reports of a rugby club the following season; and it is likely that the club did not survive the Second World War.

== Notable former players ==
=== Scotland internationalists ===
- (Scotland) Charles Villar
- (Scotland) George Paterson

=== Edinburgh District players ===
The following former Warriston players have represented Edinburgh District at provincial level.

- (Scotland) Charles Villar
- (Scotland) George Paterson
- (Scotland) G. Couper
- (Scotland) R. Johnston
- (Scotland) S. McDonald
