= Bulldog Irvine =

Scotland international rugby union player

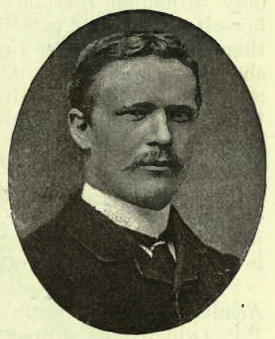
- Born: Robert William Irvine; 19 April 1853 Blair Atholl, Perth and Kinross, Scotland
- Died: 18 April 1897 (aged 43) Moulin, Scotland

Rugby union career
- Position: Forward
Amateur team(s)
Years	Team	Apps	(Points)
- Edinburgh Academicals
–	Perthshire		
Provincial / State sides
Years	Team	Apps	(Points)
1872-	Edinburgh District		
1876	East of Scotland District		
International career
Years	Team	Apps	(Points)
1871-80	Scotland	13	(Tries:1)

Doctor Robert William Irvine (1853–1897), nicknamed "Bulldog", was a Scotland international rugby football player.

== Rugby Union career ==
=== Amateur career ===
He played for Edinburgh Academicals.

=== Provincial career ===
He represented Edinburgh District against Glasgow District in the Inter-City matches; and played in the first match in 1872.

He represented East of Scotland District against West of Scotland District in 1876.

=== International career ===
He was capped 13 times for Scotland between 1871 and 1880, including the first ever rugby international.

== Family ==
He was the brother of Duncan Irvine who was also capped for Scotland.
