= Henry Enthoven =

England international rugby union player

- Born: Henry John Enthoven; 16 March 1855 Liverpool
- Died: Unknown

Rugby union career
- Position: Three-quarters
Amateur team(s)
Years	Team	Apps	(Points)
-	Richmond F.C.		
International career
Years	Team	Apps	(Points)
1878	England	1	

Henry Enthoven was a rugby union international who represented England in 1878.

== Early life ==
Henry Enthoven was born on 16 March 1855 in Liverpool.

== Rugby union career ==
Enthoven made his international debut and only appearance for England on 11 March 1878 in the match against Ireland match at Lansdowne Road. In the only match he played for his national side he was on the winning side.
