= Allan Jackson (rugby union) =

England international rugby union player

- Full name: Allan Heslop Jackson
- Born: 12 August 1858 Spanish Town, Jamaica
- Died: 15 July 1912 (aged 53)
- Occupation: General practitioner

Rugby union career
- Position: Halfback
International career
Years	Team	Apps	(Points)
1878–80	England	2	(0)

Allan Heslop Jackson (12 August 1858 – 15 July 1912) was an English international rugby union player.

Jackson, the son of a barrister, was born in Spanish Town, Jamaica.

A halfback, Jackson made both of his appearances for England against Ireland at Lansdowne Road, in 1878 and 1880. He played at club level for Blackheath and Guy's Hospital.

Jackson was married in 1887 to Eva Ray. He was a general practitioner by profession.

== See also ==
- List of England national rugby union players
