= Charles Villar =

Scottish rugby union player (1852–1877)

- Born: Charles Villar; January 1852 Leckhampton Park Farm, Cheltenham, England
- Died: 21 September 1877 (aged 24–25) Charlton Kings, Cheltenham, England

Rugby union career
- Position: Forward
Amateur team(s)
Years	Team	Apps	(Points)
1872-74	Warriston		
1875-77	Edinburgh Wanderers		
Provincial / State sides
Years	Team	Apps	(Points)
- Edinburgh District
International career
Years	Team	Apps	(Points)
1876-77	Scotland	3	(0)

Charles Villar (January 1852 – 21 September 1877) was an Scotland international rugby union player.

== Rugby Union career ==
=== Amateur career ===
Villar started his rugby career with Warriston.

Villar also played as a forward for Edinburgh Wanderers.

=== Provincial career ===
Villar represented Edinburgh District against Glasgow District in the 5 December 1874 match. He was listed as a Warriston rugby club player in this match.

=== International career ===
Villar represented Scotland in the 1875–76 Home Nations rugby union matches and 1876–77 Home Nations rugby union matches.

Villar's first international cap for Scotland was the England - Scotland match at The Oval on the 6 March 1876 match. This was the last 20-a-side international match. He had 2 other Scotland caps, against Ireland in February 1877 and against England in March 1877.

== Military career ==
Villar served in the 1st Midlothian Rifle Volunteer Corps where he was a Lieutenant.

== Family ==
Villar parents were James Villar and Mary Bridgewater and Charles had 6 brothers and 2 sisters. James Villar was an auctioneer and land agent.
