= Herbert Gardner (rugby union) =

England international rugby union player

- Full name: Herbert Prescott Gardner
- Born: 4 December 1854 Cawnpore, British India
- Died: 7 December 1938 (aged 84) Queensland, Australia

Rugby union career
- Position: Forward
International career
| Years | Team | Apps | (Points) |
| 1878 | England | 1 | |

Herbert Prescott Gardner (4 December 1854 – 7 December 1938) was an English international rugby union player.

The son of a British Army officer, Gardner was born in Cawnpore, British India, but educated in England, attending Wellington College. He had escaped Delhi with his mother during the rebellion when he was two years old.

Gardner played rugby in his youth and in 1878 was capped for England as a forward against Ireland at Lansdowne Road in Dublin. He contributed a try for his team, for which he isn't credited with any points, as only goals kicked were registered as scores at this time. He was a member of the Richmond club.

Immigrating to Australia, Gardner settled at "Dingyarra" in the Cressbrook Estate, Queensland, where he farmed.

== See also ==
- List of England national rugby union players
