= 1905–06 Scottish Districts season =

Scottish rugby union matches

- Countries: Scotland
- Date: 1905–06
- Matches played: 1

The 1905–06 Scottish Districts season is a record of all the rugby union matches for Scotland's district teams.

== History ==
Glasgow District beat Edinburgh District in the Inter-City match.

== Results ==
Date	Try	Conversion	Penalty	Dropped goal	Goal from mark	Notes
1905–1947	3 points	2 points	3 points	4 points	3 points	

=== Inter-City ===
2 December 1905

Glasgow District	11 - 3	Edinburgh District
	Report

Hamilton Crescent, Glasgow

Glasgow District:
Edinburgh District:

=== Other Scottish matches ===
23 December 1905

South of Scotland District	13 - 22	Anglo-Scots
	Report

Melrose

South of Scotland:
Anglo-Scots:

12 January 1906

Cities District	-	Provinces District
	Preview; Report

Inverleith

Cities District:
Provinces District:

=== English matches ===
No other District matches played.

=== International matches ===
22 November 1905

West of Scotland District	0 - 22	New Zealand

Hampden Park, Glasgow

West of Scotland District:
New Zealand:
