= Edward Ewart =

Scotland international rugby union player (1860–1935)

- Born: Edward Neil Ewart; 2 August 1860 Moffat, Scotland
- Died: 26 April 1935 (aged 74) Roseburg, Oregon, United States

Rugby union career
- Position: Forward
Amateur team(s)
Years	Team	Apps	(Points)
- Glasgow Academicals
Provincial / State sides
Years	Team	Apps	(Points)
1877	Glasgow District		
1878	Blues Trial		
1879	West of Scotland District		
International career
Years	Team	Apps	(Points)
1879-80	Scotland	3	((2 tries))

Edwart Ewart (2 August 1860 – 26 April 1935) was a Scotland international rugby union player.

== Rugby Union career ==
=== Amateur career ===
He played for Glasgow Academicals. He left Scotland in 1884 to go the United States after his mother died in 1883. He joined his older brother who had set up a farm in Oregon.

=== Provincial career ===
He played for Glasgow District in their inter-city match against Edinburgh District on 1 December 1877.

He played for Blues Trial in their match against Whites Trial on 16 February 1878. This trial match was to try and impress the Scotland international side selectors.

He played for West of Scotland District in their match against East of Scotland District on 1 March 1879.

=== International career ===
He was capped three times for Scotland between 1879 and 1880 spanning the 1879 Home Nations Championship and the 1880 Home Nations Championship.
