= John Bell (rugby union, born 1853) =

English rugby union player

- Full name: John Lowthian Bell
- Born: 19 April 1853 North Elswick, Northumberland, England
- Died: 16 December 1916 (aged 63) Christchurch, Dorset, England

Rugby union career
- Position: Halfback
International career
Years	Team	Apps	(Points)
1878	England	1	(0)

John Lowthian Bell (19 April 1853 – 16 December 1916) was an English international rugby union player.

Bell was a nephew of Sir Isaac Lowthian Bell, 1st Baronet. A halfback, Bell played rugby for Durham, Northumberland, Westoe and was capped once for England, appearing in a match against Ireland at Lansdowne Road in 1878. He was known for being a deceptive runner with the ball, making him good at dodging opponents.

== See also ==
- List of England national rugby union players
