= Duncan Irvine =

Scotland international rugby union player

- Born: Duncan Robertson Irvine; 2 April 1851 Blair Atholl, Scotland
- Died: 17 March 1914 (aged 62) Victoria Island, British Columbia, Canada

Rugby union career
- Position: Forward
Amateur team(s)
| Years | Team | Apps | (Points) |
- Edinburgh Academicals
| – | Aberdeen Rangers | | |
| – | Edinburgh Academicals | | |
Provincial / State sides
| Years | Team | Apps | (Points) |
| 1876-77 | East of Scotland District | | |
| 1878 | Blues Trial | | |
International career
| Years | Team | Apps | (Points) |
| 1878-79 | Scotland | 3 | (0) |

Duncan Irvine was a Scotland international rugby union player.

== Rugby Union career ==
=== Amateur career ===
He played for Edinburgh Academicals; and Aberdeen Rangers. He was staying in Old Machar, Aberdeenshire in 1881 census.

=== Provincial career ===
He played for East of Scotland District in February 1876. In this match he was deemed an Edinburgh Academical player.

He played for East of Scotland District against Edinburgh District in January 1887. His brother Bulldog Irvine played for Edinburgh; Duncan was deemed a Aberdeen Rangers player.

He played for the Blues Trial side against Whites Trial in February 1878, again classed as an Edinburgh Accies player.

=== International career ===
He was capped three times for Scotland between 1878 and 1879.

== Academic career ==
Irvine joined the British Geological Survey on 1 May 1868. He worked in south-west Scotland:- the Mull of Galloway, Wigtown and Stranraer.

He resigned from the BGS on 10 July 1882.

He moved to Canada, where he continued to be a surveyor; noted as staying at 224 Beacon Hill in Victoria City, British Columbia, in 1898.

== Family ==
His parents were Alexander Robertson Irvine and Sophia Jane Stewart Robertson. He married Sally Green in Victoria, Canada in 1900. He was the older brother of Bulldog Irvine, who was also capped for Scotland, including the first ever rugby international.

He is buried in Ross Bay Cemetery in Victoria, Canada.
