= Louis Auldjo =

Scotland international rugby union player

- Born: Louis Carnegy Auldjo; 6 November 1855 Kanpur, India
- Died: 25 June 1943 (aged 87) Ashfield, New South Wales, Australia
- Notable relative(s): John Carnegy Auldjo, brother

Rugby union career
- Position: Forward
Amateur team(s)
Years	Team	Apps	(Points)
-	Abertay RFC		
Provincial / State sides
Years	Team	Apps	(Points)
-	East of Scotland District		
-	Whites Trial		
International career
Years	Team	Apps	(Points)
1878	Scotland	1	(0)

Louis Auldjo (6 November 1855 – 25 June 1943) was a Scottish rugby union international who represented Scotland in the 1877–78 Home Nations rugby union match against England.

Auldjo was born in Cawnpore, now Kanpur, in India. His family had military connections, hence the Indian birthplace, but the Auldjo family were a well-known Dundee family. His father was John Richardson Auldjo and his mother Mary Anne Carnegy.

== Rugby Union career ==
=== Amateur career ===
He played as a forward for Abertay RFC. An Abertay match against Arbroath Rovers in noted in the Monday, 25 March 1878 issue of the Dundee Courier. Auldjo is noted as the 'source of much admiration among the connoisseurs'.

=== Provincial career ===
He represented the East of Scotland in their match against the West of Scotland; noted the Glasgow Herald of Monday 28 March 1878. He also played in the East of Scotland's match against Edinburgh District on 13 January 1877 in North Inch, Perth as noted in that day's Dundee Courier, the match report of which was in the Courier's 15 and 16 January 1877 issues; and on 17 January 1877 issue of the Aberdeen Weekly Journal.

Louis's brother John Carnegy Auldjo is also listed in the team for East of Scotland against Edinburgh District. The papers list John variously as J.C. or G.C. or G. Auldjo as a quarter-back playing for Abertay or St. Andrews University.

Louis Auldjo also played for the Whites Trial side in 1878.

=== International career ===
Louis Auldjo played on 4 March 1878 match for Scotland against England; away at The Oval.

== Other sports ==
Auldjo was well known as a sporting star in Dundee; and it is said he provided the inspiration for the founding of Dundee HSFP.

He was also a noted rower; appearing in the Broughty Ferry and Monieth Rowing Club Regatta. In the Dundee Courier of 20 August 1875, Auldjo is noted in two races for the following day.

Auldjo also played cricket for Broughty Ferry; he is noted in their team playing against Albert, a Dundee side, in the Dundee Courier of 2 June 1873.

== After rugby ==
After his playing career, he moved to Australia and married Helen Catherine Weaver in Waverley, New South Wales on 25 March 1886. He died in 1943 in Ashfield, Sydney, Australia.
