= Neil Cameron (rugby union) =

Scotland international rugby union player

- Born: Neil William Cameron; 2 September 1925 Carlisle, England
- Died: c. 2 September 1978 (aged 53) Penrith, England
- University: Glasgow University

Rugby union career
- Position: Fullback
Amateur team(s)
Years	Team	Apps	(Points)
–	Glasgow University		
Provincial / State sides
Years	Team	Apps	(Points)
-	Glasgow District		
International career
Years	Team	Apps	(Points)
1952	Scotland	3	(2)

Neil Cameron (2 September 1929 – September 1978) was a Scotland international rugby union footballer, who played as a fullback.

== Rugby union career ==
=== Amateur career ===
Cameron played for Glasgow University.

=== Provincial career ===
Cameron played for Glasgow District against Edinburgh District in the 1952–53 Inter-City match. Glasgow won the match 14 – 13, Cameron kicking penalties and a conversion to secure Glasgow's win.

=== International career ===
He was capped for Scotland three times in 1952, all of the caps coming in the Five Nations matches.

Cameron battled for the Scotland fullback place with Ian Thomson. Thomson usually won the battle and he secured 7 caps to Cameron's 3 caps.
