= George Raphael Fleming =

Scotland international rugby union player

- Born: George Raphael Fleming; 5 August 1850 Cathcart, Scotland
- Died: 13 December 1909 (aged 59) Glasgow, Scotland

Rugby union career
- Position: Forward
Amateur team(s)
Years	Team	Apps	(Points)
- Glasgow Academicals
Provincial / State sides
Years	Team	Apps	(Points)
1872-76	Glasgow District		
1876	West of Scotland District		
International career
Years	Team	Apps	(Points)
1875-6	Scotland	2	(0)

6th President of the Scottish Rugby Union
- In office 1878–1879
- Preceded by: John Chiene
- Succeeded by: Angus Buchanan

George Raphael Fleming (5 August 1850 – 13 December 1909) was a Scottish rugby union international player. He was born in Cathcart, Renfrewshire (now a suburb of Glasgow).

== Rugby Union career ==
=== Amateur career ===
Fleming played as a forward for Glasgow Academicals.

=== Provincial career ===
He represented Glasgow District against Edinburgh District in the world's first provincial match, the 'inter-city', on 23 November 1872, and also played in the 5 December 1874 match.

He also represented the West of Scotland District, captaining the side.

=== International career ===
He represented Scotland in the 1874–75 Home Nations rugby union matches and 1875–76 Home Nations rugby union matches.
