= Thomas Blatherwick =

English rugby union player

- Born: Thomas Blatherwick; 25 December 1855 Canada East
- Died: 29 January 1940 (aged 84) (registered in) Bucklow (aged 84 years 35 days)
- School: Epsom College

Rugby union career
- Position: Forward
Amateur team(s)
Years	Team	Apps	(Points)
-	Manchester Football Club		
International career
Years	Team	Apps	(Points)
1878	England	1	

Thomas Blatherwick was a rugby union international who represented England in 1878.

== Early life ==
Thomas Blatherwick was born on 25 December 1855 in Canada East. He attended Epsom College.

== Rugby union career ==
Blatherwick made his international debut and only appearance for England on 11 March 1878 in the match against Ireland match at Lansdowne Road. In the only match he played for his national side he was on the winning side.
