= Allan Arthur (rugby union) =

Scotland international rugby union player

- Born: 3 April 1857
- Died: 9 October 1923 (aged 66) Moffat, Scotland

Rugby union career
- Position: Forward
Amateur team(s)
Years	Team	Apps	(Points)
–	Glasgow Academicals		
Provincial / State sides
Years	Team	Apps	(Points)
1873–76	Glasgow District		
1876	West of Scotland District		
International career
Years	Team	Apps	(Points)
1875–76	Scotland	2	(0)

Sir Allan Arthur (1857-1923) was a Scotland international rugby football player. He later moved to India as a merchant, where he became a civil servant. He was knighted in 1900 for his Indian public service work. He was named as one of Queen Victoria's birthday knights.

== Rugby Union career ==
=== Amateur career ===
Arthur went to school at Glasgow Academy and then Merchiston College.

Arthur played for Glasgow Academicals.

=== Provincial career ===
Arthur was capped by Glasgow District.

He also played for the West of Scotland District on 28 February 1876.

=== International career ===
He was capped twice for Scotland between 1875 and 1876.

== Horse-racing career ==
The newspaper The Sportsman noted in its obituary of Arthur that he was a noted owner of race horses. Arthur became the chairman of the Royal Calcutta Turf Club. The newspaper noted that although Arthur owned a number of horses, his colours did not merit any great success.

== Business and Civil Service career ==
Allan's father, another Arthur Allan, was a merchant in the firm of Henry Montieith and Company.

At the age of 20, the younger Allan went to India. He began in the employ of the merchants Finlay, Muir and Company. He later became a director of the merchant firm Ewing and Company.

As a merchant, Allan became involved in the trade of jute. He became a director of an extensive jute shipping company: R. Steel and Company Limited.; and a director of the Manipiet Jute Company. He was also a director of the Union Baling Company.

He was elected four times as the president of the Bengal Chamber of Commerce. He retired in 1920.

His civil service career began in parallel. He was appointed a member of the Viceroy's Leglistaive Council; and in 1890 became the Sheriff of Calcutta. For his public services he received a knighthood in 1900.

== Family ==
Arthur was unmarried. He died at his home at Larch Hill in Moffat. He was the brother of John Arthur who was also capped for Scotland during the first ever rugby international.

Arthur's funeral was held on 11 October 1923. The funeral processed from Glasgow Central Station to the Necropolis, where he is buried.
