= David Watson (rugby union) =

Scottish rugby union player (1854–1906)

- Born: David Henry Watson; 7 January 1854 Glasgow, Scotland
- Died: 3 March 1906 (aged 52)

Rugby union career
- Position: Forward
Amateur team(s)
Years	Team	Apps	(Points)
- Glasgow Academicals
Provincial / State sides
Years	Team	Apps	(Points)
- Glasgow District
-	West of Scotland District		
International career
Years	Team	Apps	(Points)
1876-77	Scotland	3	(0)

8th President of the Scottish Rugby Union
- In office 1880–1881
- Preceded by: Angus Buchanan
- Succeeded by: Alexander Petrie

David Watson (7 January 1854 – 3 March 1906) was a Scotland international rugby union player. He played at the Forward position.

== Rugby Union career ==
=== Amateur career ===
Watson played for Glasgow Academicals.

=== Provincial career ===
Watson captained Glasgow District in the Inter-City match against Edinburgh District in 1876.

Watson also represented the West of Scotland District.

=== International career ===
Watson was capped by Scotland for just three matches. His debut was the 1876 match against England at The Oval on 6 March 1876; his final match was also against England the following year at Raeburn Place. The other match was against Ireland in Belfast in 1877.

=== Referee career ===
Watson became a referee after his playing career ended.

=== Administrative career ===
Watson was President of the SRU from 1880-81.
