= Malcolm Cross =

Scotland international rugby union player

- Born: Malcolm Cross; 15 June 1856 Glasgow, Scotland
- Died: 20 December 1919 (aged 63) Gatehouse of Fleet, Scotland

Rugby union career
- Position: Three Quarters
Amateur team(s)
Years	Team	Apps	(Points)
-	Glasgow Academicals		
Provincial / State sides
Years	Team	Apps	(Points)
-	Glasgow District		
- Blues Trial
1879	West of Scotland District		
International career
Years	Team	Apps	(Points)
1875-80	Scotland	9	

12th President of the Scottish Rugby Union
- In office 1884–1885
- Preceded by: Gussie Graham
- Succeeded by: Nat Brewis

Malcolm Cross was a Scotland international rugby union player.

== Rugby Union career ==
=== Amateur career ===
He played for Merchistonians.

=== Provincial career ===
Cross was capped by Glasgow District to play against Edinburgh District in the inter-city match.

He was selected and played in the Blues Trial side of 1878.

He played for West of Scotland District in March 1879.

=== International career ===
He was capped nine times for Scotland between 1875 and 1880.

== Family ==
He was the brother of William Cross who was also capped for Scotland, and who scored the first ever conversion in international rugby.
