= John Junor (rugby union) =

Scotland international rugby union player

- Born: John Elphinstone Junor; 4 November 1855 Glasgow, Scotland
- Died: 12 October 1920 (aged 64) Bristol, England

Rugby union career
- Position: Forward
Amateur team(s)
Years	Team	Apps	(Points)
- Glasgow Academicals
Provincial / State sides
Years	Team	Apps	(Points)
- Glasgow District
1876	West of Scotland District		
International career
Years	Team	Apps	(Points)
1876-81	Scotland	6	(0)

John Junor (4 November 1855 – 12 October 1920) was a Scotland international rugby union player. He played as a Forward.

== Rugby Union career ==
=== Amateur career ===
He played as a forward for Glasgow Academicals.

=== Provincial career ===
He represented Glasgow District against Edinburgh District in the last bi-annual match - until the introduction of the 1872 Cup format in the 21st century - of the 'inter-city' on 29 January 1876.

He also represented the West of Scotland District.

=== International career ===
He made 6 appearances for Scotland between 1876 and 1881.
