= William Penny (rugby union) =

England international rugby union player

- Full name: William John Penny
- Born: 15 November 1856 Langport, Somerset, England
- Died: 17 December 1904 (aged 48) at sea, off Mombasa

Rugby union career
- Position: Fullback
International career
Years	Team	Apps	(Points)
1878–79	England	3	

William John Penny (15 November 1856 – 17 December 1904) was an English international rugby union player.

Penny came from the village of Kingsbury Episcopi in Somerset.

A fullback, Penny played rugby for King's College London and in 1878 made his England debut against Ireland at Lansdowne Road. He was capped a further two times for England.

Penny was a member of the founding committee of the Middlesex RFU in 1879. He was playing for United Hospitals at this time and in the early 1880s joined Clifton RFC after becoming a consulting surgeon at Bristol General Hospital.

While on the SS Langdale in 1904, Penny fell ill and died off the coast of Mombasa.

== See also ==
- List of England national rugby union players
