= George Paterson (rugby union) =

Scotland international rugby union player

- Born: George Quintin Paterson; 5 March 1855 Bangalore, India
- Died: c. 1 March 1934 (aged 78) Hoboken, New Jersey, United States

Rugby union career
- Position: Fly half
Amateur team(s)
Years	Team	Apps	(Points)
- Warriston
–	Edinburgh Academicals		
Provincial / State sides
Years	Team	Apps	(Points)
1874	Edinburgh District		
1876	East of Scotland District		
1878	Blues Trial		
International career
Years	Team	Apps	(Points)
1876	Scotland	1	(0)

George Paterson (5 March 1855 – March 1934) was a Scotland international rugby union player.

== Rugby Union career ==
=== Amateur career ===
Paterson started at Warriston.

He was notable for his weight; he weighed under 9 stone - and is the lightest person to have played rugby union for Scotland.

Paterson later played for Edinburgh Academicals

Paterson was a mainstay in the Accies team that won the Scottish Unofficial Championship in 1878.

He retired from rugby union in 1879.

=== Provincial career ===
He played for Edinburgh District. He first played for the district in 1874 when still with Warriston.

He played for East of Scotland District.

He played for Blues Trial in their match against Whites Trial in 1878, scoring a try in the match.

=== International career ===
Paterson was capped by Scotland for one match, in 1876. It is said that his lack of weight hindered his international selection.

== Family ==
Paterson was born in Banaglore, India to parents Dr. Colin Archibald Paterson and Harriet Annette Ross. He was one of four children, all born in India. He married Louisa Augusta Stewart of Mount Carmel in Jamaica; and they had a daughter Louisa Angela Stewart Paterson who was born in Falmouth in Jamaica. His wife Louisa Augusta Stewart died in 1890; and Paterson moved to the United States. He married again in 1896 to Louise Sherwood. Paterson died in March 1934 and is buried in the Holy Cross Cemetery in North Arlington, New Jersey.
