= Glasgow University RFC =

Scottish rugby union club, based in Glasgow

Coordinates: 55.903192°N 4.314476°W

Glasgow University
- Full name: Glasgow University Rugby Football Club
- Union: SRU
- Founded: 1869; 157 years ago
- Location: Glasgow, Scotland
- Ground: Garscube
- Chairman: Harry Shell
- League(s): Men: West Non League; Women: Scottish Women's Non-League
- 2019–20: Men: West Division Non League; Women: Scottish Women's West Three, 7th of 7 (relegated)
Team kit

Glasgow University Rugby Football Club is a rugby union club at the University of Glasgow in Scotland. The Men's 1sts play in North premier 2, Men's 2nds play in Scottish Tier 1, Men's 3rds play in Scottish Tier 2, Men's 4ths play in the Scottish Tier 4, Women's 1sts play in Scottish Tier 1 and the Women's 2nds play in Scottish Tier 2. Glasgow Uni play their yearly varsity against Strathclyde at Scotstoun which the women have never lost and the Men won in 2025 in a very comfortable win #FTT

== History ==
GURFC was formed in 1869 and is one of the university's oldest student groups, predating the Glasgow University Sports Association (GUSA), to which it is now affiliated.

The team plays in black and gold, the colours of the university.

The club is a founding member of the Scottish Rugby Union and has fielded thirteen full internationalists.

In a successful 2016/17 season the 1st XV finished 1st in BUCS Scottish 1A as well as winning the BUCS Trophy. The 2nd XV finished 4th in BUCS Scottish 2A as well as reaching the final of the Scottish Conference Cup. The 3rd XV narrowly missed out on promotion coming 2nd in BUCS Scottish 4A. The club also had 7 representatives in the Scottish Students squad who defeated the Scotland U19s in February.

== Glasgow University Sevens ==
Glasgow University runs its own Sevens tournament. This began in 1898 with a tournament at Gilmorehill.

== Honours ==
=== Men ===
- Glasgow University Sevens
  - Champions: 1950, 1971
- Clydesdale Sevens
  - Champions: 1994
- Bearsden Sevens
  - Champions: 1969, 1979
- Kilmarnock Sevens
  - Champions: 1940, 1945
- Ayr Sevens
  - Champions: 1945, 1946, 1947, 1948, 1949, 1952, 1954
- Greenock Sevens
  - Champions: 1951, 1952
- Helensburgh Sevens
  - Champions: 2013
- Tennents west reserve league division 3 north
  - Champions: 2022
- North East Sevens
  - Champions: 2019

== Notable players ==
=== Men ===
The first GURFC Scotland cap was Duncan MacLeod in 1886.

- Hugh MacKintosh, 16 caps, 1930–32.
- Louis Leisler Greig, Scotland and 1903 British Lions.
- Arthur Smith, 33 caps for Scotland
- Henry Melville Napier, capped for Glasgow District while with the university, later capped internationally for Scotland in 1877-79 when at West of Scotland. Became a noted shipbuilder and founder of Napier and Miller.
- Neil Cameron
- Adam Nicol
- Alexander Stevenson
- George Robb
- Alexander Malcolm
- Ruaraidh Hart

== SRU presidents ==
Former Glasgow University players have been President of the SRU:

- 1888–89 Robert Bruce Young
