= Alexander Petrie (rugby union) =

Scottish rugby union player (1853–1909)

- Born: Alexander Gordon Petrie; 14 February 1853 Birkenhead, England
- Died: 4 February 1909 (aged 55) Edinburgh, Scotland

Rugby union career
- Position: Forward
Amateur team(s)
Years	Team	Apps	(Points)
- Royal HSFP
Provincial / State sides
Years	Team	Apps	(Points)
1872-	Edinburgh District		
1881	East of Scotland District		
International career
Years	Team	Apps	(Points)
1873-80	Scotland	11	(0)
Refereeing career
Years	Competition		Apps
1882	Home Nations		

9th President of the Scottish Rugby Union
- In office 1881–1882
- Preceded by: David Watson
- Succeeded by: William Cross

Alexander Petrie (14 February 1853 – 4 February 1909) was a Scotland international rugby union player who represented Scotland from 1873 to 1880.

== Rugby Union career ==
=== Amateur career ===
Petrie played as a forward for Royal HSFP.

=== Provincial career ===
Petrie represented Edinburgh District against Glasgow District in the world's first provincial match, the 'inter-city', on 23 November 1872.

Petrie also represented Edinburgh District against Glasgow District in the 5 December 1874 match.

=== International career ===
Petrie's international debut was the home match on 3 March 1873 at Glasgow. He turned out for Scotland a total of 11 times, his last match on 28 February 1880.

=== Referee career ===
After playing, Petrie took up refereeing rugby union matches. He refereed an international in 1882. He also became President of the Scottish Rugby Union.
