= Gussie Graham =

Scotland international rugby union player

- Born: James Hope Stewart Graham; 16 April 1856 Middlebie, Scotland
- Died: 17 October 1922 (aged 66) Dumfries, Scotland

Rugby union career
- Position: Forward
Amateur team(s)
Years	Team	Apps	(Points)
- Edinburgh Academicals
Provincial / State sides
Years	Team	Apps	(Points)
1874-	Edinburgh District		
1876-	East of Scotland District		
1878	Blues Trial		
International career
Years	Team	Apps	(Points)
1876-81	Scotland	10	(3)
Refereeing career
Years	Competition		Apps
1884	Scottish Districts		

11th President of the Scottish Rugby Union
- In office 1883–1884
- Preceded by: William Cross
- Succeeded by: Malcolm Cross

Gussie Graham (16 April 1856 – 17 October 1922) was a Scotland international rugby union player.

== Rugby union career ==
=== Amateur career ===
Graham played with Edinburgh Academicals.

=== Provincial career ===
He was capped by Edinburgh District in 1874.

He played for East of Scotland District in 1876.

He played for the Blues Trial side in 1878.

=== International career ===
Graham was capped 10 times for Scotland between 1876 and 1881.

=== Referee career ===
He refereed the 1884 inter-city match between Glasgow District and Edinburgh District.

=== Administrative career ===
He became the 11th President of the Scottish Rugby Union. He served one year from 1883 to 1884.
