= Henry Melville Napier =

Scotland international rugby union player

Henry Melvill Napier
- Born: Henry Melvill Napier; 2 May 1854 Glasgow, Scotland
- Died: 18 December 1940 (aged 86) Bowling, West Dunbartonshire, Scotland
- Notable relative(s): Ian Napier, son

Rugby union career
- Position: Forward
Amateur team(s)
Years	Team	Apps	(Points)
- Glasgow University RFC
–	West of Scotland		
Provincial / State sides
Years	Team	Apps	(Points)
- Glasgow District
-	West of Scotland District		
International career
Years	Team	Apps	(Points)
1877-79	Scotland	5	(0)

Henry Melvill Napier (2 May 1854 – 18 December 1940) was a Scottish rugby union international who represented Scotland in the 1876–77 Home Nations rugby union matches, 1877–78 Home Nations rugby union matches, 1878–79 Home Nations rugby union matches and 1879–80 Home Nations rugby union matches. Napier was also a noted engineer and shipbuilder.

== Rugby Union career ==
=== Amateur career ===
Napier played as a forward for Glasgow University RFC and West of Scotland.

=== Provincial career ===
He represented Glasgow District against Edinburgh District in the 5 December 1874 match.

He also represented the West of Scotland District.

=== International career ===
Although he gained Glasgow district cap while with the university, he gained his Scotland caps while with West of Scotland.

== Shipbuilding ==
Napier was an engineer and shipbuilder.

As a founder of Napier and Miller, a shipbuilding firm based first at Yoker, Glasgow - though then part of West Dunbartonshire - in 1898; then moving to Old Kilpatrick, West Dunbartonshire in 1906.

The company built over 120 ships including warships for the British Navy and passenger ships for the US and Canada. It also assembled RAF BE2 biplanes. The company went bust in 1931 during the Great Depression.

== Family ==
Henry Napier's son Ian Napier was a Scottish World War 1 flying ace.
