= Henry Evans =

Henry Evans may refer to:

- Henry Evans (Australian cricketer) (1846–?), Australian cricketer
- Henry Evans (English cricketer) (1857–1920), English cricketer
- Henry Evans (Evanion) (1832–1905), conjurer, ventriloquist and humorist
- Henry Evans (preacher) (c. 1760–1810), American preacher
- Henry Evans (rugby union) (1859–1925), Scotland international rugby union player
- Henry Evans (RFC officer) (1880–1916), British aviator and flying ace
- Henry Evans (theatre) (fl. 1583–1608), Elizabethan theatrical producer
- H. Clay Evans (1843–1921), American politician and businessman
- Henry Congreve Evans (1860–1899), known as Harry Congreve Evans, South Australian journalist and editor
- Harry Evans (geologist) (Henry James Evans, 1912–1990), Australian geologist, discoverer of the Weipa bauxite deposits in 1955
- Henry H. Evans (1836–1917), American politician from Illinois
- Henry R. Evans (1861–1949), American writer and amateur magician
- Henry S. Evans (1813–1872), American politician from Pennsylvania
- Henry William Evans (1890–1927), English athlete, rugby player and surgeon
- Henry S. Evans (1813–1872), American politician from Pennsylvania

in fiction:

- Henry Evans, the main antagonist of the 1993 psychological thriller film The Good Son
- Shepherd Book, a fictional character in the TV series Firefly and the sequel film Serenity, born as Henry Evans

== See also ==
- Harry Evans (disambiguation)
