= William Halliday Welsh =

Scotland international rugby union player

- Born: William Halliday Welsh; 4 September 1879 Edinburgh, Scotland
- Died: 30 June 1972 (aged 92)
- Height: 5 ft 10 in (1.78 m)
- Weight: 75 kg (11 st 11 lb; 165 lb)

Rugby union career
- Position: Wing
Amateur team(s)
Years	Team	Apps	(Points)
- Edinburgh University
–	Merchistonians		
Provincial / State sides
Years	Team	Apps	(Points)
1900	Edinburgh District		
1901	Cities District		
International career
Years	Team	Apps	(Points)
1900–02	Scotland	8	(12)

58th President of the Scottish Rugby Union
- In office 1938–1939
- Preceded by: Alfred Lawrie
- Succeeded by: Patrick Munro

Dr. William Halliday Welsh (4 September 1879 – 30 June1972) was a Scottish international rugby union player. He became the 58th President of the Scottish Rugby Union.

== Rugby Union career ==
=== Amateur career ===
Welsh played for Edinburgh University. He was part of a famous University back line in 1901–02 season: Alec Boswell Timms, James Barnett Allison (of Ireland), and Alfred Fell together with Welsh and Alexander William Duncan at Full Back. The half back pairing of Ernest Simson and Frank Fasson completed the international line-up of backs.

For 4 straight seasons, the Edinburgh University side had won the Scottish Unofficial Championship from 1899 to 1903, albeit in 3 of those seasons they shared the title with Edinburgh Academicals and Hawick (1899–1900), Watsonians (1901–02), and Glasgow Academicals (1902–03). The 1900–01 season championship was won outright by the University.

He also played for Merchistonians.

=== Provincial career ===
He played for Edinburgh District in 1900.

He played for the Cities District in 1901.

=== International career ===
He was capped 8 times for Scotland in the period 1900–02.

The Scottish Referee included this biography of Welsh in the buildup to the Scotland versus Wales match in 1901: '[Welsh] is one of the best athletes Merchiston and Scotland have produced. Three-Quarter mile champion of Scotland and at present the holder of all three short distance championships. One of the fastest men who ever played for Scotland, perhaps only equalled by W. A. Peterkin and George Campbell Lindsay. A splendid tackler, and a fine kicker with either foot. A strong, determined runner, but a little lacking in dodging ability. Combines splendidly with Alec Boswell Timms. Capped against Ireland and England last year. Saved Scotland last year from defeat by England by his great tackling of William Bunting and Forrest when clean away.'

=== Administrative career ===
He was President of the Scottish Rugby Union for the period 1938 to 1939.

After being President, Welsh was elected as a Special Representative on the board of the SRU.
