= Patrick Wauchope =

Scotland international rugby union player

- Born: Patrick Hamilton Don Wauchope; 1 May 1863 Newton, West Lothian, Scotland
- Died: 9 January 1939 (aged 75) Edinburgh, Scotland
- Notable relative(s): Andrew Wauchope, brother

Rugby union career
- Position: Half back
Amateur team(s)
Years	Team	Apps	(Points)
- Fettesian-Lorettonians
–	Edinburgh University		
–	Edinburgh Wanderers		
Provincial / State sides
Years	Team	Apps	(Points)
1886	East of Scotland District	1	(0)
1886	Edinburgh District	1	(0)
International career
Years	Team	Apps	(Points)
1885-87	Scotland	6	((1 try))

Patrick Wauchope (1 May 1863 – 9 January 1939) was a Scotland international rugby union player.

== Rugby Union career ==
=== Amateur career ===
He went to Fettes College and played for the school.

Wauchope played rugby union for Fettesian-Lorettonians and Edinburgh Wanderers.

He also played for Edinburgh University.

=== Provincial career ===
He played for East of Scotland District in their match against West of Scotland District on 30 January 1886.

He played for Edinburgh District later that year in the December inter-city match against Glasgow District on 4 December 1886.

=== International career ===
He played 6 matches for Scotland from 1885 to 1887.

== Golf career ==
He was a keen golfer, but he was better known for improving the layout of Muirfield Golf Course to make it suitable for hosting championship matches. He was a member of Kilspindie and Dornoch Golf Courses; as well as being a member of the Honourable Company of Edinburgh Golfers.

== Law career ==
He was a writer to the Signet. He worked for the firm Campbell and Don Wauchope.

== Family ==
He was born to John Don Wauchope (1816-1893) and Bethia Hamilton Buchanan (1827-1911). His family had a baronet and this passed to one of his brothers Sir John Don Wauchope, who was a chair of Midlothian County Council. Another brother Andrew Wauchope also played rugby union for Scotland.

He married Georgiana Renira Buchan Fitzjohn (1867-1928) on 10 June 1897. They had one son, also named Patrick Wauchope (1898-1989). His son, who was a keen cricketer for Edinburgh Academicals, became a farmer in Natal, South Africa.
