= Bill Glen =

Scottish rugby union player (1932–2026)

- Full name: William Sutherland Glen
- Born: 13 March 1932
- Died: February 2026 (aged 93)
- School: Merchiston Castle School
- Notable relative: Bob Gordon (cousin)

Rugby union career
- Position: Wing-forward
International career
Years	Team	Apps	(Points)
1955	Scotland	1	(0)

William Sutherland Glen (13 March 1932 – February 2026) was a Scottish international rugby union player.

== Biography ==
Glen was educated at Merchiston Castle School in Edinburgh, where he captained the rugby team. He developed into a blindside wing-forward and gained Scottish Schoolboys representative honours.

A Scone cattle farmer, Glen was selected for Scotland via Edinburgh Wanderers for the 1955 Five Nations match against Wales at Murrayfield, which they won 14–8. He retained his place for the next match against Ireland, but was unable to recover from a leg injury in time and had to withdraw.

Glen died in February 2026, at the age of 93. He was a cousin of Scotland wing three-quarter Bob Gordon.

== See also ==
- List of Scotland national rugby union players
