= Hugh Fletcher =

Hugh Fletcher may refer to:

- Hugh Fletcher (businessman) (born 1947), New Zealand businessman and chancellor of the University of Auckland
- Hugh Fletcher (footballer) (1933–2023), Scottish footballer
- Hugh Fletcher (rugby union) (1877–1962), Scottish rugby union player
