= Ronald Wright (rugby union) =

Scotland international rugby union player

- Born: Ronald William James Wright; 6 May 1949
- Died: 11 October 1983 (aged 34) Hillingdon, England

Rugby union career
- Position: Lock
Amateur team(s)
Years	Team	Apps	(Points)
- Edinburgh University
- Edinburgh Wanderers
- Richmond
Provincial / State sides
Years	Team	Apps	(Points)
-	Edinburgh District		
-	Middlesex		
International career
Years	Team	Apps	(Points)
1972	Scotland 'B'	1	(0)
1973	Scotland	1	(0)

Ronald Wright (6 May 1949 - 11 October 1983) was a Scotland international rugby union player.

== Rugby Union career ==
=== Amateur career ===
He played for Edinburgh University.

He moved on to play for Edinburgh Wanderers.

Moving to England, he then played for Richmond in London.

=== Provincial career ===
He played for Edinburgh District in the Scottish Inter-District Championship.

He played for Middlesex against Gloucestershire in the English county championship of the 1975-76 season.

=== International career ===
He was capped by Scotland 'B' on 11 November 1972 to play against France 'B' while still playing with Edinburgh University and Edinburgh Wanderers. France 'B' won the match 17 - 15 and The Glasgow Herald noted:

Apart from the solid front row, only one Scot, Wright, did himself justice. It was he that kept Scotland in contention at the touchline, and his aggressive work elsewhere, notably in ruck drive and maul wrestling, should have served as a reminder to others.

While with Edinburgh Wanderers, he made his full senior Scotland debut on 13 January 1973 against France in Paris. It was his only senior cap.
