= Alfred Lawrie =

Scottish rugby union Player and international referee

- Born: Alfred Ainslie Lawrie; 25 October 1882 Edinburgh, Scotland
- Died: 2 May 1942 (aged 59) North Berwick, Scotland
- School: Fettes College
- University: Trinity College, Oxford
- Notable relative(s): Charles Lawrie, son

Rugby union career
- Position: Wing
Amateur team(s)
Years	Team	Apps	(Points)
1903–05	Oxford University		
1905–	Edinburgh Wanderers		
Refereeing career
Years	Competition		Apps
1923	Scottish Districts		
1926	Five Nations Championship		
1926	Melrose Sevens		

57th President of the Scottish Rugby Union
- In office 1936–1938
- Preceded by: William Patrick Scott
- Succeeded by: William Halliday Welsh

Alfred Lawrie (1882–1942) was a Scottish rugby union player and an international referee. He became the 57th President of the Scottish Rugby Union.

== Rugby Union career ==
=== Amateur career ===
He was educated at Fettes College and Oxford University. At Oxford's Trinity College he played for the rugby union team Oxford University, receiving his first 'blue' on 1903.

On his return to Scotland, Lawrie played for Edinburgh Wanderers.

=== Referee career ===
He refereed the Scotland Probables versus Scotland Possibles match in December 1923.

He became an international referee. He refereed the Ireland versus France match in the Five Nations Championship of 1926.

Lawrie refereed in the 1926 Melrose Sevens.

=== Administrative career ===
He was a committee member of the SRU before becoming President.

He was the 57th President of the Scottish Rugby Union, in post from 1936 to 1938.

His time as President was notable as he gave comprehensive statements to the Press after General Meetings of the SRU. This was reported as a 'revolutionary break with tradition' for the SRU.

== Cricket career ==
He played cricket both for Fettes College and Trinity College in Oxford.

== Stockbroking and business career ==
He was a senior partner in the firm Lawrie & Ker of Edinburgh. In 1925, he became a member of the Edinburgh Stock Exchange Committee; in 1931 he was elected its chairman.

He held many directorships of various companies:- the first, second and third Edinburgh Investment Trusts; Murrayfield Ice Rink and Sports Stadium; Oregon Mortgage Company; Realisation and Debenture Corporation of Scotland; the Scottish Insurance Corporation; and the Scottish Reversionary Company.

He was the Chairman of Rest Hotels; and the St. Andrews Trust.

He was a Vice-President of the Edinburgh Chamber of Commerce until 10 days before his death, when he retired due to ill-health.

== Other interests ==
He wrote a register of Fettes College in 1923; 'The Fettes College Register 1870–1922'. He was a Governor of the Fettes Trust. He refereed the College Sports Day in 1922.

During the Second World War he joined the Special Constabulary. He also did philanthropic work with the Church of Scotland for the Hut and Canteen work for H.M. armed forces; and was an elder of St. Giles Cathedral in Edinburgh.

He was a Chairman of the West Edinburgh Unionist Association.

He was also a Justice of the Peace for Edinburgh City Council.

== Death ==
Lawrie died on 2 May 1942 at his home in North Berwick. He was cremated on 5 May 1942.

He died in the same weekend as Patrick Munro. Munro had a similar career to Lawrie: both went to Oxford University and played for the Oxford University rugby union side, both breaking through in 1903; both became Presidents of the Scottish Rugby Union; and both were prominent Unionists.
