= Harry Evans =

Harry Evans may refer to:

- Harry Evans (football manager), British football coach and former manager of Blackpool F.C.
- Harry Marshall Erskine Evans (1876–1973), Canadian politician and former mayor of Edmonton, Alberta
- Harry Evans (composer) (1873–1914), Welsh composer
- Harry Evans (Australian Senate clerk) (1946–2014), Clerk of the Australian Senate
- Harry Evans (footballer, born 1919) (1919–1962), English footballer and manager
- Harry Evans (Australian footballer) (1879–1949), Australian rules footballer
- Harry Congreve Evans (1860–1899), South Australian journalist and editor
- Harry Evans (geologist) (1912–1990), Australian geologist
- Harry L. Evans (1919–2008), US Air Force general

== See also ==
- Harry Evans Covered Bridge, Mecca, Indiana
- Harold Evans (disambiguation)
- Henry Evans (disambiguation)
