= Edinburgh University RFC =

Scottish rugby union club, based in Edinburgh

(Scotland) Edinburgh University
- Full name: Edinburgh University Rugby Football Club
- Founded: 1857; 169 years ago
- Location: Edinburgh, Scotland
- Ground: Peffermill
- President: (Republic of Ireland) Ruaidhri Power
- Coach: (Scotland) David Adamson
- Captain: (Republic of Ireland) James Boyle
- Top scorer: (England) Rob Cuthbertson
- League(s): East Non-League (Men); Scottish Women's Non-League (Women)
- 2024–25: East Non-League (Men); Scottish Women's Non-League (Women)
Team kit

Official website
- rugby.eusu.ed.ac.uk

Union website
- eulrfc.co.uk

Edinburgh University Rugby Football Club is a rugby union side based in Edinburgh, Scotland which currently plays its fixtures in the Edinburgh Regional Shield competition and the British Universities Premiership. It is one of the eight founder members of the Scottish Rugby Union. In the years prior to the SRU's introduction of club leagues in 1973 and the advent of professionalism in the 1990s, EURFC was a major club power and it won the 'unofficial' Scottish Club championship several times. It remains a club with an all-student committee, and is only open to students of the University of Edinburgh. The club runs a men's team and a women's team; both playing in the university leagues.

== History ==
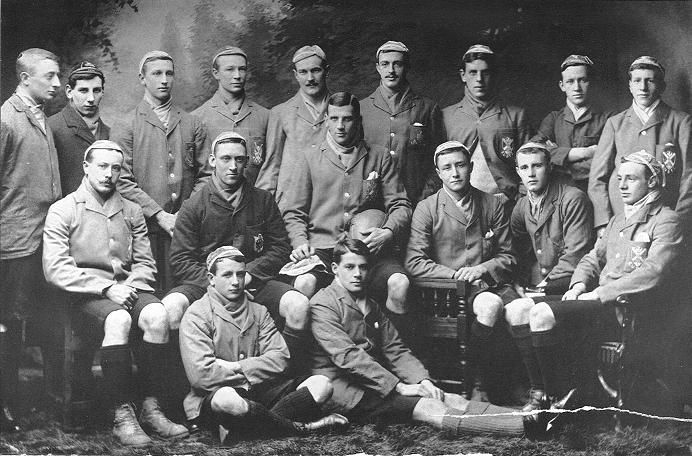
The 1901 team

Established in 1857, the club now plays its home fixtures at the University of Edinburgh's Peffermill playing grounds, having moved from its traditional ground at Craiglockhart in the season 1978–79. Its first ever match was in December 1857 against Edinburgh Academicals FC – in 2007 the two clubs replayed that fixture to celebrate the 150th anniversary of EURFC's founding using replica period kit, ball and complying to the older rules.

EURFC has produced 72 young full-international (for major IRB countries) players whilst still students representing the club; these include 1924 Olympic 400m Gold Medallist Eric Liddell, 1904 British Lions captain David Bedell-Sivright – one of the seven EURFC members also to play as British Lions whilst still students at the club, Norman Mair – the future legendary sports writer and Scotland cricketer, Black & MacDonald the great 1950 British Lions half-back partnership, and Ian Smith 'The Flying Scot' from the 1920s who held the 5-nations try-scoring record for many years.

Many more of Rugby's international players worldwide played for the university prior to being capped from other clubs; these include Scotland and British Lions greats Dan Drysdale, and Andy Irvine, both future SRU Presidents from Heriot's FP, David Johnston (Watsonians) who had also played as a contracted footballer for Heart of Midlothian FC, and the recent Club coach Ian Barnes who won many Scotland caps from the Hawick club.

In 1871, Club member Angus Buchanan scored the first ever International try in the inaugural International match whilst representing Scotland versus England at Raeburn Place. There were three current Club representatives in the Scottish brown jerseys on that day; the other two being J.Forsyth and J.L.H MacFarlane.

In 1901, after winning the Scottish unofficial championship, the Club provided an extraordinary eight members of the Scotland XV to defeat Wales that February. These were Bedell-Sivright, A.B Flett, Alfred Fell, Alex Frew, W.H Welsh, F.M Fasson, A.B Timms, and A.W. Duncan. Of these, Alex Frew not only won three Scotland caps from EURFC but also captained South Africa in its first ever match against the touring British Lions on his lone appearance for that country in 1903. This was as a representative member of the Transvaal Province, where he had settled as a doctor after his Edinburgh graduation of 1902.

A Rugby rarity happened in 1910 when EURFC player C.G. Timms had the distinction of representing the Club throughout that year and the British & Irish Lions on tour to South Africa without ever winning an international cap before or after. 'Charlie' Timms may have made up for his lack of international caps by going on to be awarded four Military Crosses in World War I as a Medical Officer – another rarity. His brother A.B Timms was capped for Scotland from the Club in 1896, but by the time he was selected for the Lions tour of 1899 he was then representing the Edinburgh Wanderers club.

The club's fortunes waned in the 1930s, but a great revival took place in the 1950s, and 1960s when the Club finished runners-up in the Scottish Unofficial Championship twice in 1963–64 and 1966–67 – in the latter year 28 out of the 34 matches played were won and the club which led the competition in April which was quite enough to have won outright, was highly commended for sportingly arranging extra fixtures, one of which was lost to Hawick who then just won that championship. In this time, names such as contemporary Scotland internationals John Frame, Ian Smith (who went on to score the famous Scotland try that defeated South Africa in 1969), and Harry Rea (an Irish cap) were to the fore.

The last major international player from the club was Jock Millican, thrice capped in 1972–73. This was after the decision had been taken by the club's [all-student] committee to back the SRU proposal for a fully league system on the grounds that it would benefit Scottish rugby as a whole, but also in the full knowledge that this would inevitably pose great problems for the Club itself. Since 1973, only Phil Lucas has been capped internationally while playing for Barbados in 2009.

Until 1983, EURFC enjoyed regular home and away fixtures with Oxford and Cambridge Universities often with distinct success; many players have interchanged between the three University Clubs on graduations – two of many notable examples of this being Ian Smith, 'The Flying Scot' who joined Edinburgh from Oxford and played for 4 seasons from 1924, and Barbarians' president Micky Steele-Bodger of England – a 1947 Edinburgh postgraduate from Cambridge destined to become future Chairman of the International Rugby Board. In this time, EURFC also had regular fixtures with the University XV's of Durham, Newcastle, and other northern English Institutions. EURFC has often received and played against Clubs from all of the major Rugby playing countries

In the years 1973 until 2012, the Club retained a position within the top 36 clubs in the SRU league structure on Saturdays; occasional promotions into the Scottish Premiership were usually balanced by returns to the top end of the National League below. Wednesday afternoons saw fixtures in the Scottish Universities championship which was won many times and very many players represented the Scottish Universities XV. Memorable victories include; 2002 BUSA Shield competition with the final played in London, and the SRU'S Scottish HydroElectric Bowl competition was registered in 2009 with the final being played against Aberdeenshire RFC at Murrayfield. However great ambition coupled with reorganisations in the British University competition saw the Club qualify for admission to BUCS Premier North 'B' League at the first available opportunity; this inevitably saw a deeply reluctant departure from the SRU league structure to aid concentration on the enormous travelling requirements south of the border. The Club remains the only Scottish University at this level.

== Sides ==
=== Men ===
In total EURFC runs four teams:
The 1st XV currently competes in BUCS Premier North A League.
The 2nd XV currently competes in BUCS Scottish 1A.
The 3rd XV currently competes in BUCS Scottish 3A.
The 4th XV currently competes in BUCS Scottish 4A. The 5th XV currently competes in the Edinburgh University Intramural League.

In the past, EURFC has also fielded an EURL (Edinburgh University Rugby League) team in the BUCS competitions.

=== Women ===
Edinburgh University also has two ladies teams, run as separate club EULRFC. The first XV were 2009 semi finalists of the British Universities Championships, and have reached the quarter finals in both 2010 and 2011. They compete in the BUCS Northern Premier Division and Scottish Premier League. The 2nd XV team currently compete in the Scottish Universities Championship and the National Development League.

== Touring ==
Edinburgh University RFC has a notable history of touring; 2004 tour to South Africa, a major tour to Japan was undertaken in 2008 where one of the games was televised. In June 2011, EURFC returned to a previously toured country in Brazil, celebrating 25 years since they had previously toured there, with two televised matches against the Brazil national rugby union team, one against a regionals side and another against Brazil's U23 side. As well as Japan and Brazil the club has also had sides in USA, Ireland, Canada, France, Australia, Argentina and Spain in recent years.

== Notable former players ==
=== Men ===
==== Scotland International players ====
The following 55 members represented Scotland as full internationals as representative members of Edinburgh University RFC.

- (Scotland) Gibbie Abercrombie 1949
- (Scotland) Les Allan 1952
- (Scotland) D. R. Bedell-Sivright 1903
- (Scotland) "Gus" Black 1947
- (Scotland) A Buchanan 1871
- (Scotland) Herbert Bullmore 1902
- (Scotland) Charles Cathcart 1872
- (Scotland) Henry Chambers 1888
- (Scotland) Ian Cordial 1952
- (Scotland) Leslie Currie 1948
- (Scotland) Jim Davidson 1952
- (Scotland) Maurice Dickson 1905
- (Scotland) Andrew Drybrough 1902
- (Scotland) A. W. Duncan 1901
- (Scotland) Henry Evans 1885
- (Scotland) Ernest Fahmy 1920
- (Scotland) Frank Fasson 1900
- (Scotland) A. N. Fell 1901
- (Scotland) Hugh Fletcher 1904
- (Scotland) Andrew Flett 1901
- (Scotland) William Forsyth 1871
- (Scotland) John Frame 1967
- (Scotland) Rowland Fraser 1911
- (Scotland) A. Frew 1901
- (Scotland) A. K. Fulton 1952
- (Scotland) John Hart 1951
- (Scotland) Bob Howie 1924
- (Scotland) James Huggan 1914
- (Scotland) Frank Hunter 1882
- (Scotland) H. H. Johnston 1877
- (Scotland) Eric Liddell 1922
- (Scotland) Ross Logan 1931
- (Scotland) D. C. Macdonald 1953
- (Scotland) Jimmy MacDonald 1903
- (Scotland) Ranald Macdonald 1950
- (Scotland) J. L. H. McFarlane 1871
- (Scotland) John MacGregor 1909
- (Scotland) David MacKenzie 1947
- (Scotland) Norman Mair 1951
- (Scotland) J. Marsh 1889
- (Scotland) Jock Millican 1973
- (Scotland) Reggie Morrison 1886
- (Scotland) Charles Nimmo 1920
- (Scotland) Frank Osler 1911
- (Scotland) William Peterkin 1881
- (Scotland) J. Reid 1874
- (Scotland) Andrew Ross 1911
- (Scotland) Ernest Simson 1902
- (Scotland) I. S. Smith 1924
- (Scotland) Louis Stevenson 1888
- (Scotland) Alexander Stewart 1874
- (Scotland) A. B. Timms 1896
- (Scotland) William Halliday Welsh 1900
- (Scotland) Leonard West 1903
- (Scotland) John Simson
- (Scotland) Henry Menzies

==== International players for other countries ====
The following 18 players represented other full international sides as representative members of Edinburgh University RFC

- (Republic of Ireland) J. B. Allison 1899
- (Republic of Ireland) S. B. B Campbell 1911
- (Republic of Ireland) W. J. N Davis 1890
- (Republic of Ireland) T. M Donovan 1889
- (England) R. S. F Henderson 1883
- (Republic of Ireland) G. McConnel 1912
- (Republic of Ireland) H. McVicar 1927
- (England) J. Marsh 1892
- (Republic of Ireland) L. C Nash 1889
- (Republic of Ireland) H. H Rea 1967
- (England) J. A. S Ritson 1910
- (Republic of Ireland) T. Smyth 1908
- (England) M. R Steele-Bodger 1947
- (Republic of Ireland) T. H Stevenson 1895
- (Republic of Ireland) R. D Stokes 1891
- (Republic of Ireland) A. S Taylor 1910
- (England) Sir Lancelot Barrington-Ward 1910
- (Barbados) Phil Lucas 2009
- (Sweden) Erik Martensson 2015
- (Hong Kong) Fin Field 2016
- (Hong Kong) Liam Owens 2016
- (Cayman Islands) Jonathan Gibson 2019

==== British & Irish Lions ====
Seven players have represented British & Irish Lions whilst still students representing the club:

- H. Brooks Three-quarter – 1888 British Lions tour to New Zealand and Australia
- John Smith Forward – 1888 British Lions tour to New Zealand and Australia
- David 'Darkie' Bedell-Sivright – 1903 British Lions tour to South Africa (toured but no test caps); 1904 British Lions tour to Australia and New Zealand (captain)
- C.G. 'Charlie' Timms – 1910 British Lions tour to South Africa
- William Albert Robertson – 1910 British Lions tour to South Africa
- Angus Black – 1950 British Lions tour to New Zealand and Australia
- Ranald Macdonald – 1950 British Lions tour to New Zealand and Australia

==== Other notable former players ====
- Sir Arthur Conan Doyle, author
- Douglas Robb, schoolmaster, President of EURFC 1993

=== Women ===
==== Scotland International players ====
- (Scotland) Lucy Winter

== SRU presidents ==
Former Edinburgh University players have been President of the SRU:

- 1879–80 Angus Buchanan
- 1889–90 Andrew Ramsay Don-Wauchope
- 1899–1900 Ian MacIntyre
- 1900–01 Robert MacMillan

== Honours ==
=== Men ===
- Scottish Unofficial Championship
  - Champions (6): 1899–1900 (shared with Edinburgh Academicals & Hawick), 1900–01, 1901–02 (shared with Watsonians), 1902–03 (shared with Glasgow Academicals), 1907–08, 1911–12 (shared with Watsonians)
- Jed-Forest Sevens
  - Champions (1): 1911
- Walkerburn Sevens
  - Champions (1): 2011
- Edinburgh Institution F.P. Sevens
  - Champions (1): 1909
- Edinburgh Charity Sevens
  - Champions (2): 1941, 1946
- Highland Sevens
  - Champions (2): 1951, 1952
- Preston Lodge Sevens
  - Champions (1): 2007
- Dreghorn Sevens
  - Champions (1): 2012
- Stewartry Sevens
  - Champions (2): 1995, 1996
- Musselburgh Sevens
  - Champions (1): 1955
- Scottish University Sevens
  - Champions (5): 1969, 1970, 1971, 1972, 2022

=== Women ===
- Colonsay Sevens
  - Champions (1): 2017
