= 1883 Scottish Athletics Championships =

Outdoor track and field competition

- Dates: 23 June
- Host city: Edinburgh, Scotland
- Venue: Powderhall Grounds
- Level: Senior
- Type: Outdoor
- Events: 12

The 1883 Scottish Athletics Championships were the first national athletics championships to be held in Scotland. They were held under the auspices of the Scottish Amateur Athletic Association at Powderhall Grounds, Edinburgh, on Saturday 23 June 1883, in front of 3000 spectators. In addition to the twelve individual athletic events there was a 1-mile bicycle race won by G. B. Batten of Edinburgh University Bicycle Club. Lord Moncreiff presented the prizes.

Some sources describe Thomas Moffat, the winner of the half-mile, as a Canadian, but it was an absolute condition of entry that you be Scottish, either from birth, parentage, or residence. Moffat was born in Sheffield, but his father John Moffat was a Glasgow doctor. Thomas Moffat had emigrated to Canada, hence the Montreal AA affiliation, but had returned home for a family occasion when the championships came along. Earlier that year there had been a rival championship, hosted by the short-lived West of Scotland Amateur Athletic Association, and Moffat is the only man to win events at both championships.

== Results summary ==
100 yards
Pos	Athlete	Time
1.	William A. Peterkin (Edinburgh Un.)	10 1/2 sec.
2.	Dr. John Smith (Queen's Park FC)	1 foot
3.	Frederick G. Westenra (Edinburgh Un.)	3 yards

440 yards
Pos	Athlete	Time
1.	William A. Peterkin (Edinburgh Un.)	51 3/4
2.	Thomas Moffat (Montreal AA)	5 yards
3.	J. Glegg (Edinburgh Un.)	4 yards

880 yards
Pos	Athlete	Time
1.	Thomas Moffat (Montreal AA)	2:00 3/4
2.	Thomas Ireland (Edinburgh Un.)	20 yards
3.	W. J. Laing (Watson's Coll. AC)	

1 mile
Pos	Athlete	Time
1.	David S. Duncan (Royal High School FP)	4:35
2.	William M. Gabriel (Edinburgh Un.)	5 yards
3.	John Johnstone (Helensburgh AC)	25 yards

120 yard hurdles
Pos	Athlete	Time
1.	Robert A. Carruthers (Fettes-Loretto)	16 3/4
2.	Andrew R. Don Wauchope (Fettes-Loretto)	2 feet
3.	Henry A. Watt (Glasgow Un.)	1 yard

3 miles walk
Pos	Athlete	Time
1.	John Harvie (Queen's Park FC)	24:10
2.	James H. Vibart (Watson's Coll. AC)	24:29

High jump
Pos	Athlete	Dist
1.	William F. Methuen (Fettes-Loretto)	5 ft 6in (1.67m)
2.	James N. Macleod (Glasgow Un.)	5 ft 5in (1.65m)

Pole vault
Pos	Athlete	Dist
1.	George Hodgson (Edinburgh & North of England AC)	9 ft 8in (2.94m)

Long jump
Pos	Athlete	Dist
1.	Daniel A. Bethune (Established Church TC)	19 ft 5 1/2in (5.93m)
2.	Arthur E. Bullock (Edinburgh Un.)	19 ft 3in (5.86m)

Shot put
Pos	Athlete	Dist
1.	Kenneth Whitton (Ross County FC)	38 ft 11in (11.86m)
2.	William A. Peterkin (Edinburgh Un.)	38 ft 9in (11.81m)
3.	Charles Reid (Edinburgh Academicals)	38 ft 8 1/2in (11.80m)

Hammer
Pos	Athlete	Dist
1.	Robert Smith (Mauchline FC)	94 ft 7in (28.84m)
2.	Kenneth Whitton (Ross County FC)	93 ft 2in (28.40m)

Throwing the cricket ball
Pos	Athlete	Dist
1.	Robert F. H. Bruce (Glasgow Un.)	322 ft 5in (98.26m)
2.	A. R. Don Wauchope (Fettes-Loretto)	316 ft 6in (96.45m)

== See also ==
- Scottish Athletics
- Scottish Athletics Championships
