= Harold Evans (disambiguation) =

Harold Evans (1928–2020) was a British journalist and editor of The Sunday Times.

Harold Evans may also refer to:

- Harold Edward Dahl (1909–1956), American pilot
- Harold Evans (attorney) (1886–1977), UN appointed administrator of Jerusalem in 1948
- Harold Evans (cricketer) (1891–1980), English cricketer
- Harold Evans (footballer) (1889–1973), former Australian rules footballer
- Harold Evans, press secretary to UK Prime Minister Harold Macmillan (1957–1963); see Downing Street Press Secretary § List of Press Secretaries

== See also ==
- Harry Evans (disambiguation)
