= Charles Milne =

Charles Milne may refer to:

- Charles Milne (politician)
- Charles Milne (rugby union)

== See also ==
- Charlie Milnes, English footballer
- Charlotte Milne, New Zealand businesswoman of Milne & Choyce
- Charles Milnes Gaskell, English lawyer
