= Henry Chambers =

Henry Chambers may refer to:

- Henry H. Chambers (1790–1826), U.S. senator from Alabama
- Henry Cousins Chambers (1823–1871), Confederate politician during the American Civil War
- Henry Chambers (Indian Army officer) (1897–1967), British Indian Army officer
- Henry Chambers (rugby union) (1865–1934), Scotland international rugby union player
- Harry Chambers (1896–1949), footballer
- William Henry Chambers, Canadian politician
