= Gibbie Abercrombie =

Scotland international rugby union player

- Born: James Gilbert Abercrombie; 9 May 1928 Edinburgh, Scotland
- Died: 23 August 1992 (aged 64) Auckland, New Zealand

Rugby union career
- Position: Hooker
Amateur team(s)
Years	Team	Apps	(Points)
- Edinburgh University
- Heriots
Provincial / State sides
Years	Team	Apps	(Points)
1950	Edinburgh District		
1950	Blues Trial		
International career
Years	Team	Apps	(Points)
1949-50	Scotland	7	(3)

Gibbie Abercrombie (9 May 1928 – 23 August 1992) was a Scotland international rugby union player.

== Rugby Union career ==
=== Amateur career ===
Abercrombie played rugby union for Edinburgh University.

He then moved to play for Heriots.

=== Provincial career ===
He played for Edinburgh District against Northumberland on 27 September 1950.

He played for the Blues Trial side against Whites Trial in 1950.

=== International career ===
He was capped for Scotland 7 times in the period 1949-1950. He scored one try against England at Murrayfield in 1950, his last cap for Scotland.

== Medical career ==
After he graduated from Edinburgh University as a doctor, he moved to the north shore of Auckland in New Zealand where he became a G.P.
