= Ranald Macdonald =

British Lions & Scotland international rugby union player

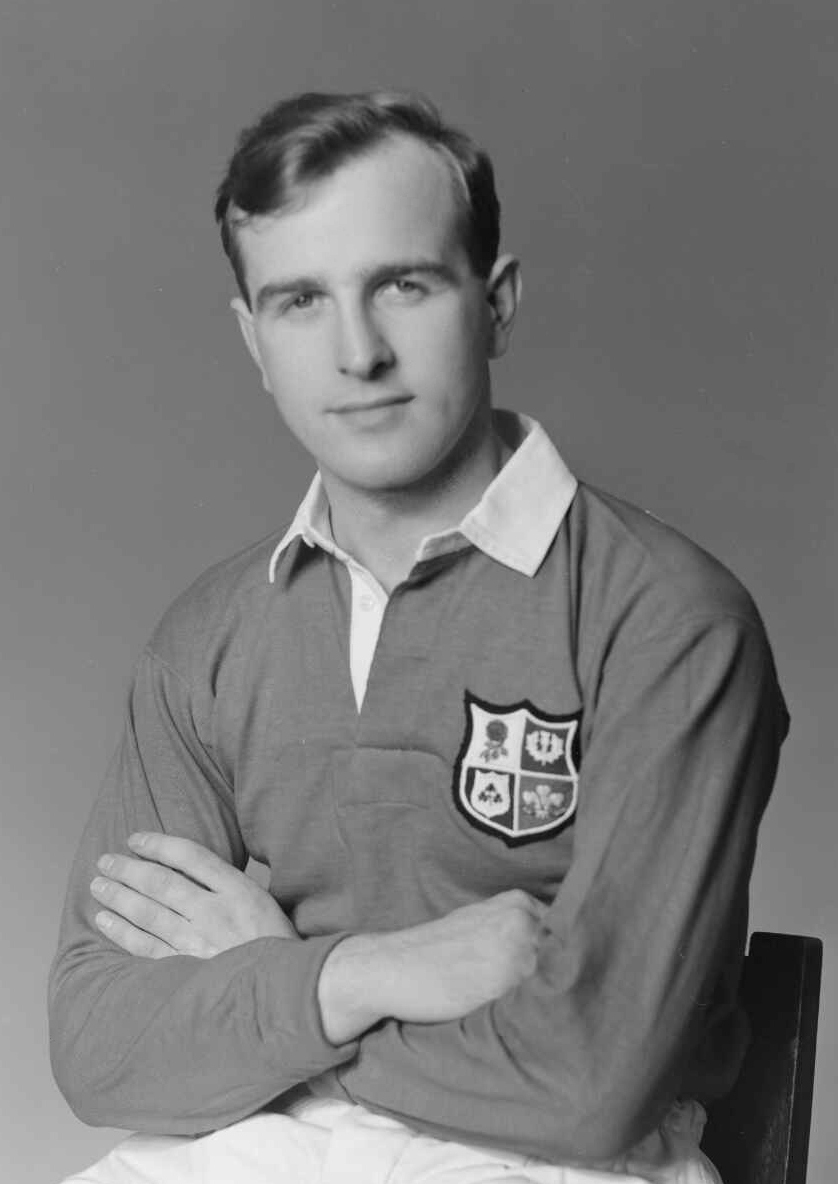
- Macdonald in New Zealand in 1950
- Born: Ranald Macdonald; 18 January 1928 Consett, England
- Died: 2 October 1999 (aged 71) Shotley Bridge, England

Rugby union career
- Position: Centre / Fly-half / Wing
Amateur team(s)
Years	Team	Apps	(Points)
- Edinburgh University RFC
Provincial / State sides
Years	Team	Apps	(Points)
- Edinburgh District
-	Cities District		
International career
Years	Team	Apps	(Points)
1950	Scotland	6	(6)
1950	British and Irish Lions	2	(3)

Ranald Macdonald (18 January 1928 – 2 October 1999) was a Scotland international rugby union player who played for Edinburgh University. Normally a fly-half, he also played at centre and on the wing.

== Rugby career ==
=== Amateur career ===
He played for Edinburgh University RFC at Fly-half, forming a successful half-back pairing with Edinburgh University's scrum half Gus Black.

=== Provincial career ===
He was capped for Edinburgh District while still at Edinburgh University. He played in the 1947 inter-city match against Glasgow District, scoring a try. He played on 2 December 1950 inter-city match against Glasgow District.

He played for Cities against Australia in 1947.

=== International career ===
He was capped for Scotland four times in 1950, playing in the Five Nations tournament in every game. He was capped at Centre.

He was later capped for British and Irish Lions in the same year, and played on the Wing for the Lions. He scored two tries in games against Wanganui and Ceylon. He had two Lions test caps but played 14 times in total on the tour scoring 14 tries.
