= William MacKintosh MacLeod =

William MacLeod
- Born: William MacKintosh MacLeod; 15 June 1861 Glasgow, Scotland
- Died: 30 June 1931 (aged 70) London, England

Rugby union career
- Position: Forward
Amateur team(s)
Years	Team	Apps	(Points)
- Fettesian-Lorettonians
–	Cambridge University		
–	Glasgow Academicals		
–	Edinburgh Wanderers		
Provincial / State sides
Years	Team	Apps	(Points)
1886	Edinburgh District		
1887	East of Scotland District		
International career
Years	Team	Apps	(Points)
1886	Scotland	2	(0)

William MacKintosh MacLeod (15 June 1861, Glasgow – 30 June 1931, Kensington, London) was a Scotland international rugby union player. (Note: One source gives his middle name as Mackensie. MacKintosh seems more likely, because (1) that name appears on a genealogical website, and (2) it was his mother's maiden name. Another source, the Cambridge University register for Trinity College, gives his middle name as Macintosh.)

== Rugby Union career ==
=== Amateur career ===
He went to Fettes College in 1873.

He played for Fettesian-Lorettonians. He was the Secretary of the club in 1886.

He went to Trinity College and played rugby union for Cambridge University.

He came back to Edinburgh and studied at University of Edinburgh.

He turned out for Glasgow Academicals in 1885.

He then played for Edinburgh Wanderers.

=== Provincial career ===
He played for Edinburgh District against Glasgow District in the inter-city match of 4 December 1886.

That same season, on 29 January 1887, he played for East of Scotland District in their match against West of Scotland District.

=== International career ===
William was a rugby union forward who played twice for Scotland in the 1886 Home Nations Championship. He was on the winning side on both occasions.

== Business career ==
He became the manager of a Fine Arts insurance company in Manchester. He also became the local chairman of the Royal Society of the Prevention of Cruelty to Children there.

He practised as a stockbroker. He practised at Fielding, Son and Macleod; where he was a senior partner.

== Family ==
He was the third and youngest son of The Very Rev. Norman MacLeod (1812-1872) and Catherine Ann MacLeod (née MacKintosh) (1824-1903), and the seventh of their eight children. Norman Macleod was minister of the Barony Church in Glasgow. One of his brothers was Sir John MacLeod MP. On 8 January 1902, he married Constance Helen Sellar (1859-1928). His wife, known as Eppie, predeceased him. She was the daughter of the Professor of Latin at Edinburgh University, William Young Sellar and cousin of Andrew Lang.
