= Jock Millican =

Scotland international rugby union player

- Born: John Gilbert Millican; 21 August 1951 (age 75) Reston, Scotland
- School: Berwickshire High School
- University: University of Edinburgh; Heriot-Watt University

Rugby union career
Amateur team(s)
| Years | Team | Apps | (Points) |
| 1969 - 73 | Edinburgh University | | |
| - | Heriot's | | |
| 1974 | Moseley | 1 | |
| 1974 - | Leicester Tigers | | |
| - | Northern | | |
Provincial / State sides
| Years | Team | Apps | (Points) |
| 1971 - 73 | Edinburgh District | | |
| 1972 | Scotland Possibles | | |
| 1973 | Staffordshire | | |
| 1974 | Anglo-Scots | | |
International career
| Years | Team | Apps | (Points) |
| 1973 | Scotland | 3 | (0) |
Coaching career
- Years: Team
- -1989: Northern

Jock Millican (born 21 August 1951) is a former Scotland international rugby union player. He is now a businessman.

== Rugby Union career ==
=== Amateur career ===
While at the University of Edinburgh from 1969 to 1973 he played rugby union for Edinburgh University.

He went on to play for Heriot's.

Leaving Edinburgh in 1973 Millican had a short 2 1/2-month spell at Moseley, but only appeared in one mid-week fixture.

He signed for Leicester Tigers in 1974.

He played for Northern in the 1980s.

=== Provincial career ===
He received his first cap for Edinburgh District in 1971, playing against South of Scotland District at Meadowbank Stadium.

He played for Scotland Possibles on 30 December 1972.

On moving to England, he played for Staffordshire.

He was then picked for the Anglo-Scots to play inter-district matches.

=== International career ===
Millican received 3 caps for Scotland, all in 1973.

=== Coaching career ===
He coached Northern in England in the late 1980s, but stood down due to business reasons.

=== Administrative career ===
He was a director of the Six Nations from 2008 to 2012; and a non-executive director of the Scottish Rugby Union from 2007 to 2013.

He became a chief executive of the Scottish Rugby Union in 2011.

He was a director of Heriots from 2015 to 2021.

== Business career ==
He graduated from the University of Edinburgh with a degree in chemical engineering, but then moved to Heriot-Watt University to study brewing.

Millican then moved into the Beer and Wine trade. He was a brewer with Bass in Burton-on-Trent in England. He was an Operations Director of Scottish Brewers, then a Logistics Director of Scottish Courage, before moving on to Waverley Vinters.

Since 2010 he has been a director of Equity Gap, a private investors group. The company sponsors Edinburgh Rugby.
