= John Hart (rugby union, born 1928) =

Scotland international rugby union player

- Born: 7 April 1928 Balfron, Scotland
- Died: 10 June 2007 (aged 79) London, England
- School: George Watson's College

Rugby union career
- Position: Wing
Amateur team(s)
Years	Team	Apps	(Points)
- Edinburgh University
–	Watsonians		
–	London Scottish		
Provincial / State sides
Years	Team	Apps	(Points)
- East Midlands
International career
Years	Team	Apps	(Points)
1951	Scotland	1	(0)

John Garrow Maclachlan Hart (7 April 1928 – 10 June 2007) was a Scotland international rugby union footballer and athlete. Hart played as a Wing.

== Rugby Union career ==
=== Amateur career ===
Hart played for London Scottish.

Hart had previously played for Edinburgh University and Watsonians.

=== Provincial career ===
He played for East Midlands.

=== International career ===
He was capped for Scotland once, in 1951.

=== Administrator ===
Hart joined the International Rugby Board as an administrator. He served as Secretary from 1971 to 1986.

== Outside of rugby ==
=== Hurdling ===
Hart represented Scotland in the 1950 British Empire Games at Auckland in the 440 yard hurdles.
