= Alec Boswell Timms =

GB Lions & Scotland international rugby union player

Alec Timms
- Born: Alexander Boswell Timms; 2 March 1872 Geelong, Australia
- Died: 5 May 1922 (aged 50) Marylebone, England
- School: The Geelong College
- University: Edinburgh University; College of Surgeons
- Notable relative: Charles Gordon Timms (brother)
- Occupation: medical doctor

Rugby union career
- Position: Centre
Amateur team(s)
Years	Team	Apps	(Points)
- Edinburgh University
–	Edinburgh Wanderers		
–	Cardiff		
Provincial / State sides
Years	Team	Apps	(Points)
1895	Edinburgh District		
International career
Years	Team	Apps	(Points)
1896–1905	Scotland	14	(16)
1899	British and Irish Lions	3	(3)

Alexander Boswell Timms (2 March 1872 – 5 May 1922) was an Australian-born international rugby union forward who played club rugby for Edinburgh Wanderers and Edinburgh University. Timms played international rugby for Scotland and was selected for the British Isles team on its 1899 tour of Australia.

== Personal history ==
Timms was born in Australia, at Mount Hesse Station west of Geelong where his father owned a sheep farm. He grew up in Geelong, attended Melbourne Grammar School before transferring to The Geelong College where he captained the school in Australian rules football, his talent earning him the nickname "Shako" and played some senior games for both Geelong College and the Geelong Football Club in 1892.

He was sent to Edinburgh to study as a medical doctor. After finishing his degree at Edinburgh University he progressed to the College of Surgeons and took the Scottish triple qualifications in 1903.

== Rugby Union career ==
=== Amateur career ===
Timms came to note as a rugby player while representing club team Edinburgh Wanderers and Edinburgh University, and it was while playing for the former club that he was first selected to represent Scotland's national team.

=== Provincial career ===
He played for Edinburgh District in the 1895 Inter-City match against Glasgow District.

=== International career ===
Timms was brought into the squad as a temporary replacement for JJ Gowans at centre in Scotland's opening game of the 1896 Home Nations Championship, played away to Wales at the Cardiff Arms Park. Scotland lost by two tries to nil and Timms was replaced by a returning Gowan for the next international.

Before Timms would win his second Scotland cap, he was selected to represent Matthew Mullineux's British Isles team on the 1899 tour of Australia. Timms scored two tries in the opening match of the campaign, against Central Southern, but missed the next four games, including the First Test against Australia. Timms regained his place for the sixth game of the tour, and missed only two more games, becoming a regular fixture in the team. After the British lost the First Test match of the tour, and Mullineux made several changes to improve his team for the Second Test. Timms was brought in at centre as replacement for Charles Adamson, and was partnered with Gwyn Nicholls, with whom he would be paired at centre for the remaining three Tests. The British won the last three Tests, with Timms scoring a try in the Third Test at Sydney.

On returning to Britain, Timms found himself back in the Scotland team, playing two games of the 1900 Home Nations Championship. From this point Timms was a regular member of the Scottish team until 1905. He played in two Triple Crown winning Championships, in 1901 and 1903. Timms was switched to the wing position for the 1904 Home Nations Championship, during a period when he moved to Wales to set up a practice in Cardiff, joining Cardiff RFC at the same time. Timms was back at centre for the Scotland team in 1905 for the games against Ireland and England. Timms scored a try in the loss to Ireland, but was given the honour, in his final international game, of captaining Scotland in the encounter against England. Scotland beat England 8–0 to retain the Calcutta Cup.
