= George Aitchison (rugby union) =

Scotland international rugby union player

- Born: George Ritchie Aitchison; 19 October 1864 Edinburgh, Scotland
- Died: 25 January 1895 (aged 30) Edinburgh, Scotland

Rugby union career
- Position: Halfback
Amateur team(s)
| Years | Team | Apps | (Points) |
- Edinburgh Wanderers
Provincial / State sides
| Years | Team | Apps | (Points) |
- Edinburgh District
International career
| Years | Team | Apps | (Points) |
| 1883 | Scotland | 1 | (0) |

George Aitchison (19 October 1864 – 25 January 1895) was a Scotland international rugby union player. He played as a halfback.

== Rugby Union career ==
=== Amateur career ===
Aitchison played for Edinburgh Wanderers, one of the top teams in Scotland at the time.

=== Provincial career ===
He was called up for the Edinburgh District side for the 1882 provincial match against Glasgow District on 2 December 1882.

=== International career ===
He was called up to the Scotland squad for the Home Nations Championship and played Ireland at Belfast on 17 February 1883.
