= Charles Milne (rugby union) =

Scotland international rugby union player

- Born: Charles James Barclay Milne; 15 May 1864 Kingston, Jamaica
- Died: 6 May 1892 (aged 27) Chertsey, England

Rugby union career
- Position: Forward
Amateur team(s)
Years	Team	Apps	(Points)
- Fettesian-Lorettonians
–	West of Scotland		
–	Edinburgh Wanderers		
Provincial / State sides
Years	Team	Apps	(Points)
1885	Glasgow District		
1886	West of Scotland District		
1886	Edinburgh District		
1887	East of Scotland District		
International career
Years	Team	Apps	(Points)
1886	Scotland	3	(0)

Charles Milne (15 May 1864 – 6 May 1892) was a former Scotland international rugby union player.

== Rugby Union career ==
=== Amateur career ===
Born in Kingston, Jamaica, to Alexander Milne and Annie Hodgson, Charles Milne was then brought up in Fyvie, Aberdeenshire. His father Andrew was a Minister for Fyvie parish in Aberdeenshire.

Milne was educated at Fettes College. He then played rugby union for Fettesian-Lorettonians.

He then moved to play for West of Scotland.

He played for Edinburgh Wanderers.

=== Provincial career ===
He played for Glasgow District in the inter-city match against Edinburgh District on 5 December 1885.

He played for West of Scotland District against East of Scotland District on 30 January 1886.

He played for Edinburgh District in the inter-city match against Glasgow District on 4 December 1886.

He played for East of Scotland District against West of Scotland District on 29 January 1887.

=== International career ===
He was capped 3 times for Scotland in 1886.

== Outside of rugby union ==
Milne was active in his local church, the East Church of Aberdeen, where he was elected an Elder. He took a career in teaching - and became a Master at the preparatory school of Fettes College. He took a bad bout of influenza and took time away from teaching; and depression settled over him. He went to the south coast of England for recuperation.

== Death ==
Milne died in Chertsey, Surrey. His death was recorded as a railway accident as he got killed while crossing a railway line; whether this was related to his depression or just an unfortunate accident is unclear. The minister at his eulogy stated that his letters were once again becoming cheerful and he hoped to be back at teaching in about a month.

At his death Milne held the post of H.M. Inspector of Schools in Aberdeen. The value of his estate was £1082; 15 shillings; and 6 pence.
