= Evanion Collection =

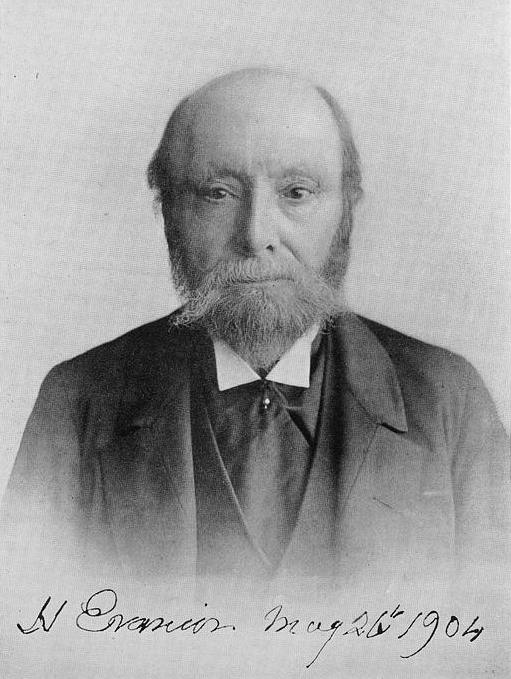
Henry Evans in 1904.

The Evanion Collection is a collection of printed Victorian ephemera in the British Library created by the conjurer, ventriloquist and humorist Henry Evans who used the stage name 'Evanion'.

== Contents ==
The collection of around 5,000 items was purchased by the British Museum Library in 1895 and includes:

- Posters recording popular Victorian entertainments in Music Halls, Palaces of Variety, Theatres, and Circuses. These include performers such as Marie Lloyd, Dan Leno, Maskelyne and Cooke, and Evanion himself.
- Advertisements and price lists for clothes, food, medicines, household items and domestic goods, together with Trade catalogues and cards which illustrate everyday life in Victorian England in the second half of the nineteenth century.
- Tickets for theatrical performances, race meetings, lectures and exhibitions.

Harry Houdini described seeing the collection for the first time as follows:

With some hesitancy of speech but the loving touch of a collector he opened his parcel. "I have brought you, sir, only a few of my treasures, sir, but if you will call - " I heard no more. I remember only raising my hands before my eyes, as if I had been dazzled by a sudden shower of diamonds. In his trembling hands lay priceless treasures for which I had sought in vain … In the presence of his collection I lost all track of time.

Many items from the original collection relating to magic were acquired by Houdini and are now owned by the Harry Ransom Humanities Research Center at the University of Texas at Austin.

== Sample items from the collection ==
- Advertisement for teas by Cooper, Cooper and Co., 1887.
- Poster for Maskelyne and Cooke's Marvellous Entertainment at the Egyptian Hall, London, 1887.
- Seed catalogue by Webb and Sons, the Queen's Seedsmen, 1885.
