= 1895–96 Scottish Districts season =

Rugby union competition

- Countries: Scotland
- Date: 1895–96
- Matches played: 1

The 1895–96 Scottish Districts season is a record of all the rugby union matches for Scotland's district teams.

== History ==
Glasgow District and Edinburgh District fought out a nil - nil draw in the Inter-City match. This was the first draw in the fixture since 1879; and the first nil-nil since January 1876 (back when the Inter-City was a twice-a-season format).

The North of Scotland played Edinburgh Wanderers at the end of the season. It was intended to be a XV a side match, North had selected their side, but it seems likely that Wanderers only turned up with XI players so a XI a side match had to be played instead.

== Results ==
Date	Try	Conversion	Penalty	Dropped goal	Goal from mark	Notes
1894–1904	3 points	2 points	3 points	4 points	4 points	

=== Inter-City ===
7 December 1895

Glasgow District	0 - 0	Edinburgh District
	Report

Hamilton Crescent, Glasgow

Glasgow District:
Edinburgh District:

=== Other Scottish matches ===
14 December 1895

North of Scotland District	3 - 37	South of Scotland District
	Report

North of Scotland:
South of Scotland:

28 December 1895

Provinces District	v	Cities District
	Report; Report

Merchiston Castle grounds

Provinces:
Cities:

21 March 1896
3.15pm

North of Scotland District	3 - 6	Edinburgh Wanderers
	Preview; Report

Mannofield Park, Aberdeen
Referee: Roger Davidson

North of Scotland:
Edinburgh Wanderers:

=== English matches ===
No other District matches played.

=== International matches ===
No touring matches this season.
