= 1975–76 Rugby Union County Championship =

English rugby union competition

1975–76 County Championship
- Countries: England
- Champions: Gloucestershire (13th title)
- Runners-up: Middlesex

The 1975–76 Rugby Union County Championship was the 76th edition of England's County Championship rugby union club competition.

Gloucestershire won their 13th title after defeating Middlesex in the final.

== First round ==
Pos	Northern Group	P	W	D	L	F	A	Pts
1	Lancashire +	5	4	0	1	75	65	8
2	Cheshire	5	4	0	1	87	72	8
3	Northumberland	5	3	0	2	82	42	6
4	Yorkshire	5	3	0	2	70	57	6
5	Cumberland & Westmorland	5	1	0	4	67	87	2
6	Durham	5	0	0	5	41	99	0

+ Lancashire won play off 13-3

Pos	Midland Group	P	W	D	L	F	A	Pts
1	North Midlands	5	4	1	0	98	51	9
2	Warwickshire	5	4	0	1	104	60	8
3	Leicestershire	5	3	1	1	107	82	7
4	Notts, Lincs & Derby	5	2	0	3	90	76	4
5	Staffordshire	5	1	0	4	46	117	2
6	East Midlands	5	0	0	5	59	118	0

Pos	South East Group	P	W	D	L	F	A	Pts
1	Middlesex	5	5	0	0	198	27	10
2	Surrey	5	3	0	2	128	63	6
3	Eastern Counties	5	3	0	2	101	68	6
4	Kent	5	3	0	2	89	94	6
5	Sussex	5	1	0	4	53	196	2
6	Hampshire	5	0	0	5	47	168	0

Pos	South-West Group	P	W	D	L	F	A	Pts
1	Gloucestershire	3	3	0	0	58	21	6
2	Cornwall	3	2	0	1	48	32	4
3	Devon	3	1	0	2	30	57	2
4	Somerset	3	0	0	3	26	52	0

Pos	Southern Group	P	W	D	L	F	A	Pts
1	Hertfordshire	4	3	0	1	89	37	6
2	Buckinghamshire	4	2	0	2	52	42	4
3	Oxfordshire	4	2	0	2	58	64	4
4	Dorset & Wilts	4	2	0	2	53	89	4
5	Berkshire	4	1	0	3	26	46	2

== Second round ==
Venue	Team One	Team Two	Score
Croxley Green	Hertfordshire	Gloucestershire	7-29

== Semi finals ==
Venue	Venue	Team One	Team Two	Score
28 Feb	Bristol	Gloucestershire	Lancashire	15-7
7 Feb	Moseley	North Midlands	Middlesex	9-20

== Final ==
27 March 1976

Middlesex	9–24	Gloucestershire
Pen: Whibley (2); Drop: Birkett		Try: Butler; Con: Butler; Pen: Butler (6)

Athletic Ground, Richmond
Referee: K Pattinson (North Midlands)

15	David Whibley	Richmond
14	Colin Lambert	Harlequins
13	Graham Birkett	London Scottish
12	Alan Friell (capt)	London Scottish
11	Elgan Rees	Borough Road College
10	A J M Young	St Mary's Hospital
9	Alan Lawson	London Scottish
8	Andy Ripley	Rosslyn Park
7	Bob Mordell	Rosslyn Park
6	Adrian Alexander	Harlequins
5	Chris Ralston	Richmond
4	Ronald Wright	Richmond
3	B J Adam	Wasps
2	G G Bignell	Wasps
1	Lee Barlow	Rosslyn Park
Replacements:
16	P A Treseder	Rosslyn Park
17	A W Hill	Moseley
18	P Crerar	London Scottish
19	A V Boddy	Richmond
20	M F Claxton	Harlequins
21	Kevin Bowring	Borough Road College

15	Peter Butler	Gloucester
14	Bob Clewes	Gloucester
13	John Bayliss (capt)	Gloucester
12	Chris J Williams	Bristol
11	Alan Morley	Bristol
10	Chris G Williams	Gloucester
9	Peter Kingston	Gloucester
8	Dave Rollitt	Bristol
7	Mike Rafter	Bristol
6	John Watkins	Gloucester
5	Roger Powell	Llanelli
4	John Fidler	Gloucester
3	Mike Burton	Gloucester
2	John Pullin	Bristol
1	Barry Nelmes	Cardiff
Replacements:
16	David Sorrell	Bristol
17	Richard Mogg	Gloucester
18	John Cannon	Clifton
19	Kenneth Phelps	Bristol
20	Alf Troughton	Bristol
21	John Haines	Gloucester

== See also ==
- English rugby union system
- Rugby union in England
