= Reggie Morrison =

Scotland international rugby union player

- Born: Reginald Herbert Morrison; 24 March 1864 Geelong, Victoria, Australia
- Died: 1 May 1941 (aged 77) Melbourne, Victoria, Australia

Rugby union career
- Position: Centre
Amateur team(s)
Years	Team	Apps	(Points)
- Edinburgh University
Provincial / State sides
Years	Team	Apps	(Points)
1885	Edinburgh District		
1886-87	East of Scotland District		
International career
Years	Team	Apps	(Points)
1886	Scotland	3	(0)

Reggie Morrison (24 March 1864 - 1 May 1941) is a former Scotland international rugby union player.

== Rugby Union career ==
=== Amateur career ===
He played for Edinburgh University. He captained the side between 1885 and 1887.

=== Provincial career ===
He played for Edinburgh District in the inter-city match against Glasgow District on 5 December 1885. He scored 2 tries in the match.

He played for East of Scotland District against West of Scotland District on 30 January 1886. He also played in the corresponding 1887 fixture.

=== International career ===
He was capped 3 times for Scotland in 1886. He scored 2 tries in Scotland's win over Ireland.

His great-granddaughter in law brought Morrison's Scotland international cap back to Murrayfield Stadium in 2010, so that it can be displayed by the Scottish Rugby Union. It is now showcased at the President's Suite at the stadium. She also brought a cap Morrison obtained from the university; and another cap.

== Other sports ==
Growing up in Geelong, Victoria, Australia, Morrison first played Australian Rules Football for Geelong Football Club.

Morrison ran in the 1885 Scottish Athletic Championships organised by the S.A.A. Noted as unlucky, Morrison came third in 3 events: 100 yards, 440 yards and the 880 yards races. All 3 races were noted as very close, and Morrison's combined losing distance over the 3 races was only 3 feet.

== Medical career ==
He graduated from Edinburgh University with a degree in medicine. He was to return to Australia where he set up a G.P. practice in Toorak, Victoria. He worked as a gynaecologist at the Royal Women's Hospital in Melbourne; and was one of the founders of the Royal Australasian College of Surgeons.
