= Charles Berry (rugby union) =

Scottish rugby union player

- Born: Charles Walter Berry; 6 September 1863 Leuchars, Scotland
- Died: 11 October 1947 (aged 84) Edinburgh, Scotland

Rugby union career
- Position: Forward
Amateur team(s)
Years	Team	Apps	(Points)
- Fettesian-Lorettonians
- Oxford University
- Edinburgh Wanderers
Provincial / State sides
Years	Team	Apps	(Points)
1886	Edinburgh District		
1887-88	East of Scotland District		
International career
Years	Team	Apps	(Points)
1884-88	Scotland	9	(6 conv, 1 gfm)

Charles Berry (6 September 1863 – 11 October 1947) was a Scotland international rugby union player.

== Rugby Union career ==
=== Amateur career ===
He played for Fettesian-Lorettonians.

He became a student at Oxford University; and played for the Oxford University.

He then played for Edinburgh Wanderers.

=== Provincial career ===
He played for Edinburgh District in the 1886 inter-city match against Glasgow District.

He played for East of Scotland District in the January 1887 match against the West of Scotland District, scoring a conversion in the match. He played in the corresponding fixture the following year, in 1888, again for East of Scotland.

=== International career ===
He was capped 9 times for Scotland in the period 1884 to 1888. He scored 7 goals; 6 conversions and 1 goal from mark in those 9 matches.

== Family ==
His father was Walter Oliphant Berry (1827-1905); and his mother was Emily Eliza Hanson (1827-1909).

== Death ==
The Scotsman of 15 October 1947 reported Berry's death:

One of Scotland ' s Oldest Rugby Caps.
By the death of Mr Charles Walter Berry in Edinburgh, at the age of 84, Scotland has lost one of her senior Rugby internationalists and Loretto School one of a notable band of pupils who provided the nucleus of the Oxford University XV in the match with Cambridge in the 1880s. When at Loretto Mr Berry was three years in the Rugby team, and four seasons in the cricket eleven, of . which he was captain in 1882. Proceeding to Oxford University, he got his Blue for Rugby in 1883, and again the following year, when there was a notable representation of seven players from the Musselburgh school in the team. The others were H. B. Tristram, G. C. Lindsay, A. S. Blair, A. G. G. Asher, A. McNeill, and R. C. Kitto. About the same time Mr Berry, a forward of fine physique, had attained international status, getting the first of his eight [sic] Scottish caps. Mr Berry, who was a bachelor, and lived at 11 Atholl Crescent, Edinburgh, never lost his interest in sport or in his old school. His copy of the Loretto Register was kept up to date in meticulous fashion. Gifted with an excellent memory he could recall incidents of long ago with rare facility. Last winter, when a representative of The Scotsman sought his help on behalf of a Welsh Veteran, against whom he had played at Newport in 1888, and who was anxious for news of Scottish Rugby survivors of that period, Mr Berry readily provided accurate details of the match as well as of his opponent. Among many other interests, Mr Berry, who was a merchant, was especially fond of music.
