= Jake Selby =

Scotland international rugby union player

- Born: John Alexander Robertson Selby; 28 July 1900 Port William, Dumfries and Galloway, Scotland
- Died: 15 February 1951 (aged 50) Cheadle Hulme, England

Rugby union career
- Position: Scrum half
Amateur team(s)
Years	Team	Apps	(Points)
1919-26	Watsonians		
1920-25	Kelso		
1921-22	Edinburgh University		
1926-27	Bradford RFC		
1928-29	Watsonians		
Provincial / State sides
Years	Team	Apps	(Points)
1919	Edinburgh District		
1920	Scotland Probables		
1926-27	Yorkshire		
International career
Years	Team	Apps	(Points)
1920	Scotland	2	(0)

Jake Selby (28 July 1900 – 15 February 1951) was a Scotland international rugby union player.

== Rugby Union career ==
=== Amateur career ===
Selby played for Watsonians.

This is from the Dundee Evening Telegraph of Wednesday 16 January 1929:

The Watsonians have splendid pack this season, and they did some great work, as also did the 'Sonians old international scrum half, Jake Selby.

He also played for Kelso from 1920 to 1925.

He played for Edinburgh University the 1921–22 season.

He played for Bradford RFC from 1926 to 1927.

=== Provincial career ===
Selby played for Edinburgh District.

He played for Scotland Probables in the trial match of January 1920.

While playing for Bradford, he was also capped for Yorkshire.

=== International career ===
Selby was capped for Scotland 2 times, all in 1920.

== Medical career ==
He became a doctor. He obtained his medical degree from Edinburgh University in 1925. From the Berwickshire News and General Advertiser of Tuesday 22 December 1925:

Jake Selby is now a fully fledged doctor, and it may be that his infrequent appearances on the Rugby this season foreshadows his retirement from the game. Selby who is a Scottish Rugby Internationalist, is well known in Berwickshire, and has frequently turned out for Kelso Rugby team.

This from Edinburgh Evening News of Tuesday 7 October 1930:

A WATSONIAN'S NEW POST. DR J. A. R. SELBY FOR HONG-KONG. J. A. R. Selby, the wcii-known Edinburgh rugby player and internationalist, has received an appointment as Specialist Medical Officer at Hong-Kong under the Colonial Medical Service, and will sail at an early date.. Dr Selby graduated at Edinburgh University five years ago, and has since been engaged in hospital work in Bradford, in the Venereal Diseases Department. and the Bacteriological Department of the Royal Infirmary, Edinburgh, and as Resident Medical Officer at East Paoli Hospital, Edinburgh. During the past six months he has been Resident Surgical Officer at St Paul's Hospital for Genito-Urinary Diseases, London. _ . Educated at George Watson's College, Edinburgh,‘ Dr Selby played for his . school at cricket and Rugby, and was a member of the Watsonians XV. from 1919 to 1926, and again from 1928 till the end of last season. He also played Rugby for Bradford and Yorkshire in 1926-27. Ile was " capped " against Wales in 1920, his first year of senior football.

== Family ==
His father was Dr. William McDowall Selby (1873-1933), and his mother was Catherine Purves Logan Robertson.

== Death ==
His death was reported in the Edinburgh Evening News of Saturday 17 February 1951:

DEATH OF FORMER RUGBY `CAP' The death has occurred at Cheadle-Hulme, Cheshire, of Dr J. A. R. Selby. the former Scottish internationalist, who played at scrum half against Wales and Ireland in 1920. Dr Selby, who was about 50 years of age, was a native of Portpatrick, and was the son of a doctor. He was educated at George Watson's College. and after he left school, played for the Watsonians at scrum half. The regular occupant of the position, Dr C. S. Nimmo, who was the captain at that time, sportingly chose to play stand-off to accommodate Dr Selby. In addition to his two "caps," Dr Selby was also chosen to play against England in 1920, but withdrew from the side because of injury, and Dr Nimmo took his place. Dr Selby had held an executive post for several years in the Queen Mary Hospital, Hong-Kong, and in the late war he was a prisoner of the Japanese. On his release he returned to Hong-Kong, but retired last year and returned to Scotland. Dr Selby accepted a medical post in Cheshire after a holiday.

The Berwickshire News and General Advertiser of Tuesday 27 February 1951 also had this:

Selby in his day was the youngest member of the Scottish team playing the year after he left Watson's College. It will be remembered in addition to playing for Watsonians, he played for Kelso during the season 1920-1921 when captain was J. S. Roberton, well known Border farmer, and other members of the team were J. H. Lindsay (Prenderguest, Ayton), R. F. Thomson, W. McKenzie, B. Turner (Coldstream), A. Sanderson, Alex. C. A. Steven (Berwick), T. Laing (Harrietfield, Kelso), J. Hume, W. S. Black, R. Laidlaw, R. Lyall. J. T. Laing (Harrietfield) and C. W. Calder (West Gordon, Gordon). Dr Selby spent several years in an executive position in the Queen Mary Hospital. Hong Kong. In the late war he was a prisoner in Jap hands and after the war he returned to his post. He was home on leave in Scotland three years ago. Last year he retired and returned to this country but after a holiday he accepted a medical position in Cheshire.
