= Charles Nimmo =

Scottish rugby union player

- Full name: Charles Stuart Nimmo
- Born: 10 June 1895 Edinburgh, Scotland
- Died: 20 February 1943 (aged 47) Jedburgh, Scotland
- School: George Watson's College
- University: University of Edinburgh
- Occupation: General practitioner

Rugby union career
- Position: Half-back
International career
Years	Team	Apps	(Points)
1920	Scotland	1	(0)

Charles Stuart Nimmo (10 June 1895 – 20 February 1943) was a Scottish international rugby union player.

Born in Edinburgh, Nimmo attended Viewpark School and George Watson's College. He enlisted with the 9th Royal Scots at the beginning of World War I and was commissioned into the Seaforth Highlanders in November, 1914.

Nimmo gained his solitary Scotland cap as a half-back in the 1920 Calcutta Cup match against England at Twickenham, replacing an injured Jake Selby in the line up. He played his club rugby with Selby for Watsonian XV and was captain during their championship-winning 1920–21 season.

A 1921 University of Edinburgh graduate, Nimmo obtained a medical degree and after a short appointment at Edinburgh Royal Infirmary became a general practitioner in Jedburgh in 1922.

== See also ==
- List of Scotland national rugby union players
