= Fettesian-Lorettonian Club =

Scottish sports club, based in Edinburgh

(Scotland) Fettesian-Lorettonian
- Full name: Fettesian-Lorettonian Football Club
- Union: Scottish Rugby Union
- Founded: 1881; 145 years ago
- Location: Edinburgh, Scotland

The Fettesian-Lorettonians Club is a Scottish sporting club made up of former pupils of Fettes College and Loretto School. The club was founded in 1881 and has seen members of its club represent the Scotland national rugby union team.

== Club history ==
The Fettesian-Lorettonians Club was formed in 1881, when a scratch team of ex-Fettes College students underwent a tour of North Yorkshire under the name Fettes Rovers in 1880. Failing to recruit a full team, the side approached the headmaster of rival college Loretto School, and requested if he would allow members of the Loretto XI could play for the team. Their request was granted, and the partnership between the two schools was so successful it was turned into a friendly sporting club. The original circular for the official formation of the club was signed by A. R. Paterson, a well known Lorretonian and Oxonian and Andrew Ramsay Don-Wauchope, representing Fettes and Cambridge. Although formed primarily as a rugby union club. the club also branched into other sports and athletics.

In March 1881, as part of the Home Nations encounters, Fettesian-Lorettonian were first represented at international level when Andrew Ramsay Don-Wauchope was chosen to play for Scotland against England. Don-Wauchope played 13 matches for Scotland, all whilst a playing club rugby for Fettesian-Lorettonian. Don-Wauchope was followed soon after by his younger brother Patrick, who won six caps for Scotland while representing the club. The most notable Scottish player was David Bedell-Sivright, who studied at Fettes, and made most of his international appearances with Cambridge University, but in 1901 made appearances against Ireland and Wales as a Fettesian-Lorettonian player. Beddell-Sivright was a major character of Scottish rugby and not only captained his country, but also led one of the earliest British Lions teams to Australia.

== Former international players ==
- (Scotland) David Bedell-Sivright
- (Scotland) Charles Berry
- (Scotland) Macbeth Duncan
- (Scotland) Andrew Ramsay Don-Wauchope
- (Scotland) Patrick Wauchope
- (Scotland) George Campbell Lindsay
- (Scotland) William MacLeod
- (Scotland) Charles Milne
- (Scotland) Lewis Robertson
- (Scotland) A. G. G. Asher
- (Scotland) Henry Menzies

== SRU presidents ==
Former Fettesian-Lorettonian players have been President of the SRU:

- 1889–90 Andrew Ramsay Don-Wauchope

== See also ==
- Merchistonians FC

== Bibliography ==
- Marshall, Rev. F (1892). Football: The Rugby Union Game. London: Cassell and Company Ltd.
- Massie, Allan A Portrait of Scottish Rugby (Polygon, Edinburgh; ISBN 0-904919-84-6)
