= Harold Evans (footballer) =

Australian rules footballer

Personal information
- Full name: Harold Gordon Evans
- Nickname: Tich
- Born: 28 February 1889; Parkville, Victoria
- Died: 20 January 1973 (aged 83); Heidelberg, Victoria
- Original team: Carlton District
- Height: 164 cm (5 ft 5 in)
- Weight: 60 kg (132 lb)

Playing career^{1}
Years	Club	Games (Goals)
1913	Carlton	2 (0)
- ^{1} Playing statistics correct to the end of 1913.

Harold Gordon Evans (28 February 1889 – 20 January 1973) was an Australian rules footballer who played with Carlton in the Victorian Football League (VFL). Prior to joining Carlton, he played with Carlton District in the Metropolitan Amateur Football Association (MAFA).
