= Henry Evans (rugby union) =

Scotland international rugby union player (1859–1925)

- Born: Herbert Lavington Evans; 14 December 1859 Clifton, England
- Died: 9 April 1925 (aged 65) Goring-on-Thames, England

Rugby union career
- Position: Centre
Amateur team(s)
Years	Team	Apps	(Points)
- Edinburgh University
Provincial / State sides
Years	Team	Apps	(Points)
1885	East of Scotland District		
1885	Edinburgh District		
International career
Years	Team	Apps	(Points)
1885	Scotland	2	(0)

Henry Evans (14 December 1859 – 9 April 1925) was a Scotland international rugby union player.

== Rugby Union career ==
=== Amateur career ===
Evans played rugby union for Edinburgh University.

=== Provincial career ===
He played for East of Scotland District in the match against the West of Scotland District in January 1885.

He later played for Edinburgh District in the inter-city match against Glasgow District in December 1885.

=== International career ===
He played two matches for Scotland in 1885, both against Ireland.

== Medical career ==
Evans became a doctor. In 1901, he had to give evidence to an inquest on the case of a Mrs Mills of Streetley who committed suicide. Evans was the doctor called. The Reading Mercury of 27 July 1901 reported:

Dr. Herbert Lavington Evans said he had not attended deceased just lately, she had been staying with a relative at Worthing, but he attended her before she went away. She was depressed and suffering from nervous indigestion, but this was not apparently of a serious nature. He was sent for about 11 o'clock on Sunday morning, and when he arrived he found deceased seated in chair, described, with her head inclined to the left, and razor was lying in her right hand. There was a large wound on the left side of the neck in front. She was quite dead. Her hand was marked by the handle of the razor; evidently two cuts had been made with great force, and he had no doubt it was done by her own hand. A verdict that "Deceased died from her throat being cut with razor whilst in unsound state of mind", was returned.

He was called to another inquest in 1913 when the Countess of Cottenham died of a gunshot wound, thought to have been inflicted when she slipped while carrying her gun. The Banbury Guardian of 8 May 1913 reporting:

Dr. Herbert Lavington Evans, Goring, said be found that the charge from the gun had entered the body under the left breast and had passed out at the left side of the back. The appearance the wound indicated tliat the gun was discharged at close quarters. The wound was in itself ample cause death. He did not think the charge touched the heart. He could not give any idea as how long Lady Tottenham had been dead. There was on his arrival slight stiffening of the body. As far he could judge should think death had taken place over an hour before saw* the body, as it had cooled considerably. The left ribs had been pierced the charge, and it had made its way out the fifth rib just above the loin. Judging the large amount of blood which was lost he should imagine that death was very speedy. He formed the opinion, from the marks which he saw at the spot, that probably Lady Cottenham, after being shot, had rolled down the hill few feet, and that she had sufficient strength left to prop herself against the tree against which the body was resting. There was a discoloration the clothes, and some blackening around the wound. The muzzle of the gun was probably within a few inches of the body at the time the shot was fired. The wound was extremely small at the opening; that clearly proved that the gun must have been very close to the body when it was fired.

== Family ==
He was born to David Parker Evans (1816-1880) and Susan Mary Nicholson (1825-1920) in Clifton, Gloucestershire.

He married Maud Trimmer in 1885.

They had 3 children:- Violet Muriel Evans, Norman Duthie Evans and Aileen Marion Evans.
