= Andrew Ramsay Don-Wauchope =

Scotland international rugby union player & referee

A. R. Don-Wauchope
- Born: Andrew Ramsay Don-Wauchope; 29 April 1861 Bridgeton, Glasgow, Scotland
- Died: 16 January 1948 (aged 86) Paris, France
- School: Fettes College
- University: Trinity College, Cambridge

Rugby union career
- Position: Halfback
Amateur team(s)
Years	Team	Apps	(Points)
-	Cambridge University R.U.F.C.		
–	Fettesian-Lorettonian Club		
–	Edinburgh University RFC		
–	Edinburgh Wanderers		
Provincial / State sides
Years	Team	Apps	(Points)
1883	Edinburgh District		
1884	East of Scotland District		
International career
Years	Team	Apps	(Points)
1881–1888	Scotland	13	(0)
Refereeing career
Years	Competition		Apps
1889-	Home Nations		

17th President of the Scottish Rugby Union
- In office 1889–1890
- Preceded by: Robert Bruce Young
- Succeeded by: Gordon Mitchell

Andrew Ramsay "Bunny" Don-Wauchope (29 April 1861 – 16 January 1948) was a Scottish international rugby union back who played club rugby for Cambridge and Fettesian-Lorettonian. Don Wauchope played an important role within the early growth of Scottish rugby and after retiring from international rugby he became a referee and was the President of the Scottish Rugby Union. He was considered Scotland's outstanding half-back of the early 1880s and is credited as being one of the pioneers of modern half-back play.

Born into the Don-Wauchope Baronetcy, Don-Wauchope was an all-round sportsman, representing his school and then university in rugby and athletics. He was a prolific try scorer, scoring six tries in his international career, though as a try was not worth any points at the time his scoring record remains blank. Don-Wauchope was also a keen cricketer, he went on to represent Scotland, playing in the very first encounter between Scotland and Ireland in 1888.

== Personal history ==
Don-Wauchope was born in Bridgeton, Glasgow in 1861 to Sir John Don-Wauchope, 8th Baronet of Newton and Bethia Hamilton Buchanan. He was the second son of the Baronet, and the title passed onto his elder brother John Douglas when their father died in 1893. Don-Wauchope was educated at Fettes College before graduating to Trinity College, Cambridge in 1880. He graduated from Cambridge with a BA in 1884, and whilst at university he won sporting Blues in rugby and in athletics for hurdling. He also finished second in the hurdles at Scottish Championships at Powderhall Stadium in 1883. Don-Wauchope became a stock-broker by profession and in 1903 he married Emma Margaret Salmond, daughter of Sir William Salmond. By 1941 he had taken up residency in Saint-Briac-sur-Mer in France, and died in 1948 in Paris.

== Rugby Union career ==
=== Amateur career ===
Don-Wauchope first came to note as a rugby player while studying at Cambridge. He won two sporting Blues for rugby in 1880 and 1881, and captained the Cambridge University team. Whilst still at university, Don-Wauchope and A.R. Paterson of Loretto School organised the first meeting of the Fettesian-Lorettonian Club, until then a loose collection of former school pupils that had played cricket together the previous season. The club was founded in 1881, and Don-Wauchope became captain of the Fettesian-Lorettonian club.

While at Cambridge, Don-Wauchope took his Fettesian-Lorettonian team, firstly on tours of Scotland, and then venturing into North England. After playing several games against more well founded Scottish teams, such as West of Scotland and Edinburgh Wanderers, the club faced English teams, Manchester and Huddersfield. Although losing my narrow score lines in Scotland, the Fettesian-Lorettonian team won both matches in England, which saw the Athletics News report "...persons who saw the doings of the Fettes-Loretto boys in Huddersfield and Manchester are willing to swear that a better team never existed, and a general wish has been expressed that Don-Wauchope should bring his grand team into the North of England once more."

In 1883 he was playing for Edinburgh University.

Later that same season, he moved to Edinburgh Wanderers.

=== Provincial career ===
He was capped by Edinburgh District for the inter-city match in 1883.

He was capped by East of Scotland District in their match against the West of Scotland District in January 1884.

=== International career ===
He was chosen to represent Scotland in the 1881 international friendly with England. The game ended in a draw, and although not present for Scotland's next encounter, against Ireland, he was again playing at half-back for the next match to England. The game was played at Manchester, with Scotland winning by two tries to nil, the first time Scotland had beaten the English on their own soil.

After playing in the very first Scotland match against Wales in early 1883, scoring his first international try in the game, Don-Wauchope was incapacitated for the rest of the season with a knee injury. He regained his place for all three matches of the 1884 Home Nations Championship, paired at half back with Oxford University rival Augustus Grant-Asher. After victories over Wales and Ireland, where he scored another try, this time against Ireland; the Scottish team were beaten by England in a contentious game at Blackheath. The next season saw Scotland draw to Wales, beat Ireland, and refuse to face England. Don-Wauchope played in both games of the 1885 Championship and in the home clash with Ireland, not only scored his third international try, but was also joined at half-back with his younger brother Patrick Hamilton Don-Wauchope. This was Patrick's first international game, and he would go on to win five more caps for Scotland.

The 1886 Championship saw Scotland win the tournament trophy for the first time, with wins over Wales and Ireland, and a draw against England. Don-Wauchope scored a try in the encounter with Wales and two in a massive victory over the Irish. Although missing all of the 1887 international matches, Don-Wauchope played one final game for his country in 1888. Played at home against Ireland, he was given the honour of the Scotland captaincy, leading his team out to a final victory.

==== International matches played ====
Scotland

- England 1881, 1882, 1884, 1886
- Ireland 1884, 1885, 1886, 1888
- Wales 1883, 1884, 1885, 1886

=== Referee career ===
After his retirement from playing international rugby, Don-Wauchope kept his connections with the sport when he became a referee. He first officiated an international match in 1889 when he took charge of the Home Nations Championship encounter between Wales and Ireland. It had been a busy day for Don-Wauchope, as he had spent the morning chairing a meeting of the International Rugby Board. He went on to referee another two international games, in 1890 and 1893.

=== Administrative career ===
Don-Wauchope became the 17th President of the Scottish Rugby Union. He served the 1889–90 term in office.

== See also ==
- List of Scottish cricket and rugby union players
