= 1950–51 Scottish Districts season =

Rugby union competition

- Countries: Scotland
- Date: 1950–51
- Matches played: 1

The 1950–51 Scottish Districts season is a record of all the rugby union matches for Scotland's district teams.

== History ==
Glasgow District beat Edinburgh District in the Inter-City match.

Fixtures: November 4—Midlands v. North, in the North; Glasgow and District Union v. Rest of Western Clubs, in Glasgow; Edinburgh and District Union v. South District Union, in the South. November 11—North v. South, in Midlands. November 8—East v. West Juniors, in Edinburgh. December 2—lnter-City, in Glasgow. December 16—First trial, in the South. December 23—Second trial, at Murrayfield. January 6—Final trial, at Murrayfield. January 13—Scotland v France, in Paris. February 3-Scotland v. Wales, at Murrayfield. February 24—Scotland v. Ireland, at Murrayfield. March 17—Scotland v. England, at Twickenham.

Co-Optimists played South on the 4 October 1950.

== Results ==
Date	Try	Conversion	Penalty	Dropped goal	Goal from mark	Notes
1948–1970	3 points	2 points	3 points	3 points	3 points	

=== Inter-City ===
2 December 1950

Glasgow District	11 - 3	Edinburgh District
	Report

Old Anniesland, Glasgow

Glasgow District:
Edinburgh District:

=== Other Scottish matches ===
5 October 1950

South of Scotland District	-	Co-Optimists
	Preview

Philiphaugh, Selkirk

South of Scotland District:
Co-Optimists:

7 April 1951

South of Scotland District	16 - 9	Earlston, Peebles and Walkerburn
Try: Notman; Maxwell; Charters; Grant; Con: Wilson; Allan	Report	Try: Waldie; Pen: Little x 2

The Gytes, Peebles

South of Scotland District:
Earlston, Peebles and Walkerburn:

18 April 1951

Co-Optimists	3 - 12	South of Scotland District
	Report

Goldenacre, Edinburgh

Co-Optimists|
South of Scotland District:

=== English matches ===
27 September 1950

Edinburgh District	-	Northumberland

Goldenacre, Edinburgh

Edinburgh District:
Northumberland:

19 October 1950
4pm

Scottish Border XV	-	Durham County
	Preview

Riverside Park, Jedburgh
Referee: A. I. Dickie (Gala)

Scottish Border XV:
Durham County:

=== Trial matches ===
23 December 1950

Blues Trial	-	Whites Trial
	Preview; Report

Murrayfield Stadium

Blues Trial:
Whites Trial:

=== International matches ===
No touring matches this season.
