= Evanion =

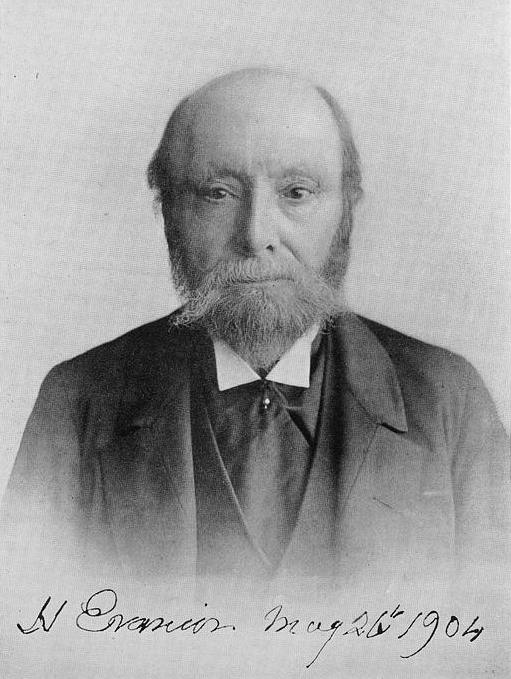
Henry Evans in 1904.

Henry Evans (c. 1832 – 17 June 1905) was a conjurer, ventriloquist and humorist, born in Kennington, South London, who used the stage name Evanion. Performances in front of members of the British Royal Family, including Queen Victoria at Sandringham, and the Prince of Wales (later Edward VII) and Princess Alexandra at Marlborough House, enabled him to use the name "The Royal Conjuror" in his publicity.

== Career ==
Evans had a successful career of over fifty years from 1849, performing in theatres and music halls in London and the English provinces and at private functions. He was an inveterate collector who created a collection of around 5000 items of ephemera relating to popular Victorian entertainment and daily life that is now in the British Library as The Evanion Collection. The collection was purchased by the British Museum Library in 1895. He was acquainted with Harry Houdini who purchased a quantity of items related to magic and illusions from Evans in 1904. Much of Houdini's material from Evanion is held in Houdini's collection at the Harry Ransom Center in Austin, Texas. According to Houdini, Evans spent every spare hour at the British Museum collecting information about the history of magic.

== Death ==
Evans died, impoverished, of cancer of the throat at Lambeth Infirmary on 17 June 1905. He was survived by his wife who died not long afterwards.

== See also ==
- Evanion Collection
