= Henry H. Evans =

American politician

Col. Henry H. Evans
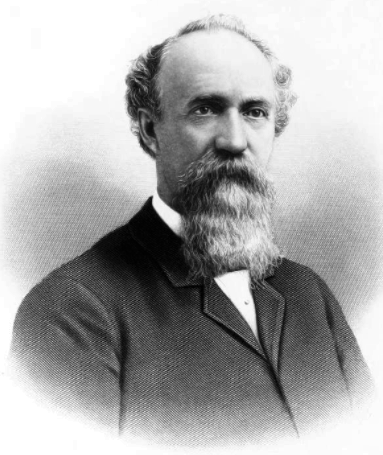

Member of the Illinois Senate from the 14th district
- In office 1880 – 1908
- Preceded by: Joseph H. Mayborne
- Succeeded by: Thomas B. Stewart

Personal details
- Born: March 9, 1836 Toronto, Ontario, Canada
- Died: March 27, 1917 (aged 81) Aurora, Illinois, United States
- Party: Republican
- Profession: Businessman

Henry H. Evans (March 9, 1836 – March 27, 1917) was an American politician and businessman, involved in restaurants and real estate. He entered politics as a member of the Illinois House of Representatives in 1876. In 1880, he was elected to the Illinois Senate and served until 1908 and served twelve consecutive two-year terms.

== Biography ==
Henry H. Evans was born on March 9, 1836, in Toronto, Upper Canada, to Griffith and Elizabeth Evans. His father was a millwright from Harrisburg, Pennsylvania, who was traveling with his wife on business when Henry was born. In June 1841, the Evans family moved to Aurora, Illinois. Evans attended public schools and then founded an ice cream and restaurant business. In 1862, he enlisted in the 124th Illinois Volunteer Infantry Regiment of the Union Army for the Civil War. With the unit, he participated in the Battle of Jackson, Mississippi, and the Siege of Vicksburg. After the latter engagement, he was detached so that he could apply his culinary skills in an army hospital. He was mustered out in 1865 and returned to Aurora to continue in the restaurant business.

In 1873, he purchased the Fitch House and turned it into the Hotel Evans. After a few years of direct management, he leased it out. Evans became involved in the Aurora real estate trade, platting ten additions to the city. He founded the Aurora Street Railway in 1882 and founded the Joliet, Aurora and Northern Railway in 1884. He was also president of the German-American National Bank of Aurora and a director of the Aurora Gas Company and the National Bank of the Republic. Evans was a member of the local Grand Army of the Republic Post, Aurora Post No. 20, and donated $500 towards the erection of Memorial Hall in 1877.

He became increasingly interested in politics and was elected to the Illinois House of Representatives as a Republican in 1876. He was elected to the Aurora city council as an alderman from the ninth ward in the same year. Though he was not re-elected after his two-year term expired, he was elected to the Illinois Senate in 1880. He was re-elected to this position in every election until 1908. He was a leader in the effort to found the Illinois Soldiers' and Sailors' Children's School. He was an adviser to four Illinois governors as a colonel.

Evans married Alice M. Rhodes in 1858. They had one son, Arthur. Evans died at his home in Aurora on March 27, 1917, and was buried in Spring Lake Cemetery two days later.
