= Alexander William Duncan =

Scottish rugby union player and cricketer

Alexander Duncan
- Born: Alexander William Duncan; 19 June 1881 Scotland
- Died: 18 November 1934 (aged 53) Scotland
- University: University of Edinburgh

Rugby union career
Amateur team(s)
Years	Team	Apps	(Points)
- University of Edinburgh RFC
International career
Years	Team	Apps	(Points)
1901-02	Scotland		

Alexander William Duncan (19 June 1881 – 18 November 1934) was a Scottish international rugby and cricket player.

He was capped for Scotland between 1901 and 1902. He also played for University of Edinburgh RFC.

He also played for the Scotland national cricket team.

== See also ==
- List of Scottish cricket and rugby union players
