= Ernest Simson =

- Full name: Ernest David Simson
- Born: 13 March 1882 Edinburgh, Scotland
- Died: 22 July 1910 (aged 28) Nowshera, India
- School: Merchiston Castle School
- University: University of Edinburgh

Rugby union career
- Position: Halfback
International career
Years	Team	Apps	(Points)
1902–07	Scotland	17	(16)

Ernest David Simson (13 March 1882 — 22 July 1910) was a Scottish international rugby union player.

Born in Edinburgh, Simson attended Merchiston Castle School and the University of Edinburgh.

Simson was halfback and captain of Edinburgh University RFC. He made his Scotland debut in the 1902 Calcutta Cup at Inverleith and played every possible match until his retirement in 1907, gaining 17 caps.

A captain in the Indian Medical Service, Simson was stationed in Nowshera and died of cholera at the age of 28.

== See also ==
- List of Scotland national rugby union players
