= Henry Chambers (rugby union) =

Scotland international rugby union player (1865–1934)

- Born: Henry Francis Townsend Chambers; 22 May 1865 St. Kilda, Victoria
- Died: 12 February 1934 (aged 68) Grouville, Jersey

Rugby union career
- Position: Full Back
Amateur team(s)
Years	Team	Apps	(Points)
-	Edinburgh University		
Provincial / State sides
Years	Team	Apps	(Points)
1888	Edinburgh District		
1889	East of Scotland District		
International career
Years	Team	Apps	(Points)
1888-89	Scotland	4	(0)

Henry Chambers (22 May 1865 – 12 February 1934) was a Scotland international rugby union player.

== Rugby Union career ==
=== Amateur career ===
Chambers played rugby union for Edinburgh University.

=== Provincial career ===
He played for Edinburgh District in their inter-city match against Glasgow District on 1 December 1888.

He played for East of Scotland District in their match against West of Scotland District on 26 January 1889.

=== International career ===
Chambers was capped four times by Scotland, from 1888 to 1889.
