= Harry Evans (footballer, born 1919) =

English footballer and manager

Personal information
- Full name: Harry Alfred Evans
- Date of birth: 17 April 1919
- Place of birth: London, England
- Date of death: 22 December 1962 (aged 43)
- Place of death: London, England
- Position: Forward

Senior career*
Years	Team	Apps	(Gls)
- Woking
- Fulham
- Romford
- Aldershot
1943–1947	Southampton	1	(0)
1947–1949	Exeter City	41	(6)
1949–1950	Aldershot	16	(5)

Managerial career
- 1955–1959: Aldershot
- * Club domestic league appearances and goals

Harry Alfred Evans (17 April 1919 – 22 December 1962) was an English footballer and manager who played as a forward. Born in Lambeth, Evans began his professional career with Woking, and later played for a number of Football League clubs including Southampton and Exeter City. He retired from professional football in 1950, after which he worked in various managerial positions at Aldershot and Tottenham Hotspur.

== Playing career ==
Early in his career, Harry Evans played for Isthmian League club Woking, Football League members Fulham, Athenian League side Romford, and Third Division South team Aldershot, before joining Southampton in October 1943 whilst serving in the Royal Air Force during the Second World War. After making 71 unofficial wartime appearances, Evans made only a single league appearance (in addition to four FA Cup matches) when The Football League resumed in 1946, playing at centre forward in a 3–2 win over Bradford Park Avenue on 23 November 1946.

After leaving the Saints at the end of the season, Evans completed his professional playing career with brief spells at Third Division South clubs Exeter City and Aldershot, before taking on the role of secretary at Aldershot in 1950.

== Coaching and management career ==
In 1955 he took over as manager of the Shots following the departure of Gordon Clark, leading the club through 184 matches including 53 wins before leaving in 1959.

In August 1959 Evans was chosen by Tottenham Hotspur manager Bill Nicholson to take on the job of assistant manager at the club, where he remained until his death in December 1962. During this period, Evans helped lead Tottenham to one First Division championship, two consecutive FA Cup wins, an FA Charity Shield, and a European Cup semi-final.
