= Hugh Fletcher (footballer) =

Scottish footballer

Personal information
- Full name: Hugh Malcolm Fletcher
- Date of birth: 8 April 1933
- Place of birth: Lochgilphead, Scotland
- Date of death: 25 January 2023 (aged 89)
- Place of death: Ardrishaig
- Position: Full back

Senior career*
Years	Team	Apps	(Gls)
- Lochgilphead
1952–1956	Celtic	0	(0)
1956–1962	Carlisle United	124	(18)
- * Club domestic league appearances and goals

Hugh Malcolm Fletcher (8 April 1933 - 25 January 2023) was a Scottish professional footballer who played for Carlisle United in the Football League.

Fletcher was born in Lochgilphead, Argyll, and began his football career with his local club, Lochgilphead F.C. He signed for Celtic, but never played for the first team, and moved south of the border to join Third Division North club Carlisle United ahead of the 1956–57 season. Although primarily a full back, Fletcher was sometimes used in a more forward position, and in his third season with Carlisle, he finished as the club's top scorer, with 19 goals in all competitions, 17 in the league. He remained with Carlisle until the 1961–62 season, finishing with 18 goals from 124 league appearances.
