= Ian Cordial =

Scotland international rugby union player

- Born: Ian Fergusson Cordial; 14 November 1926
- Died: 22 September 2000 (aged 73) North Yorkshire, England

Rugby union career
- Position: Centre
Amateur team(s)
Years	Team	Apps	(Points)
- Edinburgh Wanderers
Provincial / State sides
Years	Team	Apps	(Points)
- Edinburgh District
International career
Years	Team	Apps	(Points)
1952	Scotland	4	(0)

Ian Cordial (14 November 1926 – 22 September 2000) was a former Scotland international rugby union player. Cordial played as a Centre.

== Rugby career ==
=== Amateur career ===
Cordial played for Edinburgh Wanderers.

=== Provincial career ===
Cordial represented Edinburgh District. He played in the 1951–52 season Inter-City match against Glasgow District. He scored Edinburgh's try; their only points in the game. Glasgow won the match 6–3.

=== International career ===
He was capped for Scotland four times in 1952, all of the caps coming in the Five Nations matches.
