= Hugh Fletcher (rugby union) =

Scotland international rugby union player

- Born: Hugh Nethersole Fletcher; 27 April 1877 Norwich, England
- Died: 29 January 1962 (aged 84) Norwich, England

Rugby union career
- Position: Forward
Amateur team(s)
Years	Team	Apps	(Points)
- Edinburgh University
- Norwich RFC
Provincial / State sides
Years	Team	Apps	(Points)
1904	Edinburgh District		
1905	Cities District		
International career
Years	Team	Apps	(Points)
1904-05	Scotland	2	(0)

Hugh Fletcher (27 April 1877 – 29 January 1962) was a Scotland international rugby union player.

== Rugby Union career ==
=== Amateur career ===
He played rugby union for Edinburgh University.

He later played for Norwich RFC.

=== Provincial career ===
He played for Edinburgh District against Glasgow District in the 1904 inter-city match at Hamilton Crescent.

He played for Cities District against Provinces District in their match on 14 January 1905.

=== International career ===
He was capped for Scotland 2 times in the period 1904 to 1905.

== Football career ==
He played for Norwich CEYMS F.C. and then captained Norwich City. He played at centre-half. He played in Norwich rugby club against Norwich Union Fire Office in an association football match in 1905.

== Cricket career ==
He played cricket for the British Medical Association.

== Medical career ==
He became a surgeon at Sussex County Hospital.

== Family ==
He was the second son of Benjamin Edgington Fletcher (1836-1911) of Marlingford Hall, Norfolk.

He married Dorothy Alice Sanderson in 1912.

== Death ==
He died on 29 January 1962.
