= Bob Gordon (rugby union) =

Scotland international rugby union player

- Born: Robert Gordon; 25 July 1930
- Died: 21 March 1995 (aged 64) Edinburgh, Scotland

Rugby union career
- Position: Wing
Amateur team(s)
Years	Team	Apps	(Points)
- Edinburgh Wanderers
Provincial / State sides
Years	Team	Apps	(Points)
- Edinburgh District
International career
Years	Team	Apps	(Points)
1951-53	Scotland	6	(6)

Bob Gordon (25 July 1930 – 21 March 1995) was a Scotland international rugby union footballer. Gordon played as a Wing.

== Rugby career ==
=== Amateur career ===
Wilson played for Edinburgh Wanderers.

=== Provincial career ===
Gordon played for Edinburgh District against Glasgow District in the 1950–51 season's Inter-City match.

Glasgow won the Inter-City match 11 - 3, the start of a run of 3 wins in the fixture. Despite the loss, The Glasgow Herald noted improvement in Gordon's game: 'There is less desperation in the play of Gordon than there was a year ago and his strong running and coolness in difficult situations almost produced two tries from poor chances.'

=== International career ===
He was capped for Scotland 6 times between 1951 and 1953, playing in 6 Five Nations matches.
