= Henry Evans (Australian cricketer) =

Australian cricketer

Personal information
- Born: 6 August 1846; Launceston, Van Diemen's Land

Domestic team information
- Years: Team
- 1868/69: Tasmania
- 1873/74–1875/76: Wellington
- Source: Cricinfo, 24 October 2020

Henry Evans (born 6 August 1846, date of death unknown) was an Australian cricketer. He played one first-class match for Tasmania during the 1868–69 season, and two first-class matches for Wellington, one in each of 1873–74 and 1875–76.

Born at Launceston in what was then Van Diemen's Land in 1846, Evans worked as an architect. He lived at Timaru during the 1870s and 1880s and designed St Joseph's church in the town. He is thought to have moved to England.
