= John Reid (umpire) =

South African cricket umpire (1874–1948)

Personal information
- Born: 13 April 1874
- Died: 14 January 1948 (aged 73)

Umpiring information
- Tests umpired: 1 (1923)
- Source: Cricinfo, 7 June 2019

John Reid (13 April 1874 – 14 January 1948) was a South African cricket umpire. He stood in one Test match, South Africa vs. England, in 1923.

== See also ==
- List of Test cricket umpires
