= Angus Black =

British Lions & Scotland international rugby union player

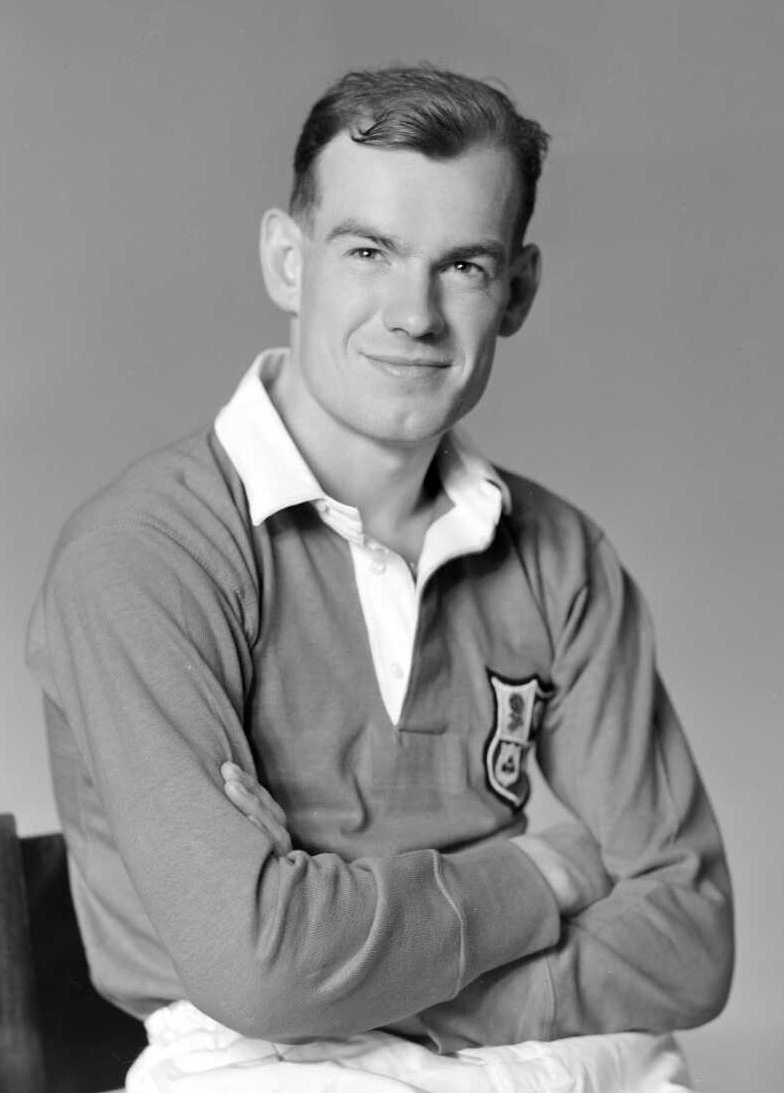
- Black in New Zealand in 1950
- Born: Angus William Black; 6 May 1925
- Died: 14 February 2018 (aged 92)

Rugby union career
- Position: Scrum-half
Amateur team(s)
Years	Team	Apps	(Points)
- Edinburgh University
–	Leicester Tigers		
–	Bristol Bears		
–	RAFRU		
Provincial / State sides
Years	Team	Apps	(Points)
-	Edinburgh District		
-	Cities		
-	Scotland Possibles		
International career
Years	Team	Apps	(Points)
1947–1950	Scotland	8	(0)
1950	British and Irish Lions	2	(0)

Angus William "Gus" Black (6 May 1925 – 14 February 2018) was a Scottish international rugby union player, who played for Scotland and the Lions.

== Rugby Union career ==
=== Amateur career ===
Black played for Edinburgh University.

He went on to play for Leicester and Bristol during his National Service.

He played for the Royal Air Force Rugby Union in 1954.

=== Provincial career ===
Black was capped for Edinburgh District.

He played for the Cities District side in their match against Australia in October 1947.

He turned out for the Scotland Possibles side in 1947.

=== International career ===
Black made his first international appearance on New Year's Day 1947 while studying medicine at the University of Edinburgh. He also played for Edinburgh University rugby team, and was on the 1950 British Lions tour to New Zealand and Australia where he played in two tests, playing in a 9–9 draw in Dunedin and a 0–8 loss in Christchurch.

== Death ==
Black lived in Lundin Links in Fife. After moving into a care home in the 1990s, Black died in February 2018 and at the time of his death was the oldest living Lions player.
