= Edinburgh Wanderers =

Defunct Scottish rugby union club, based in Edinburgh

(Scotland) Edinburgh Wanderers
- Full name: Edinburgh Wanderers Football Club
- Union: Scottish Rugby Union
- Founded: 1868
- Disbanded: 1997; 29 years ago
- Location: Edinburgh, Scotland
- Ground: Murrayfield Stadium
Team kit

Edinburgh Wanderers is a former rugby union club, founded in 1868. It was latterly a tenant of the Scottish Rugby Union, playing home fixtures at Murrayfield Stadium for nearly 75 years. In 1997 it merged with Murrayfield RFC to form Murrayfield Wanderers.

== Formation ==
The rugby club was formed in 1868. The club was initially known as St. Andrew's Wanderers, as it was formed by St. Andrews University graduates based in Edinburgh.

== Early history ==
The club quickly became known as Edinburgh Wanderers - and the side established itself as one of the best in Scotland. In the world's first provincial match - between Glasgow District and Edinburgh District - in 1872, the side was already known as Edinburgh Wanderers and provided 3 players to the first Edinburgh District side:- A. Ross; J. Forsyth and A. R. Stewart

The club would have been the ninth founding club of the Scottish Rugby Union had the club secretary made it to the inauguration meeting of the union in 1872.

Instead it initially joined the (English) Rugby Football Union in that same year. However a year later as the Scottish Rugby Union grew, the Wanderers resigned from the RFU to join the SRU.

The Wanderers team of 1876-77 is noted as one of the best in its history.

In 1937 Wanderers provided both captains, Ross Logan and Idwal Rees, in the Scotland v Wales fixture that year. This was the first time in the history of rugby that opposing international captains were, at the same time, teammates at club level, and has only been replicated since the advent of professionalism.

== Renaming and admission of MRFC members ==
At a Special General Meeting in 1997 Wanderers changed their name for a second time to become Murrayfield Wanderers FC. This was to facilitate the merger of the Murrayfield RFC. The Club then invited the members of Murrayfield RFC to join the renamed organisation. This proposal was accepted at an SGM of MRFC shortly thereafter.

For the subsequent history of Murrayfield Wanderers see:

== Honours ==
- Scottish Division 2 winners: 1990.
- Scottish Division 3 winners: 1984.
- Hawick Sevens
  - Champions (1): 1946 (jointly fielded team with Edinburgh Academicals)
- Melrose Sevens
  - Champions (1): 1973
- Peebles Sevens
  - Champions (1): 1947 (jointly fielded team with Edinburgh Academicals)
- Edinburgh Charity Sevens
  - Champions (5 outright): 1942 & 1945 (both years a jointly fielded team with Edinburgh Academicals), 1953, 1966, 1967, 1973, 1974
- Royal HSFP Sevens
  - Champions (2): 1971, 1988
- Portobello Sevens
  - Champions (1): 1982
- Moray Sevens
  - Champions (1): 1968
- Kirkcaldy Sevens
  - Champions (1): 1970
- Howe of Fife Sevens
  - Champions (4): 1970, 1973, 1988, 1989
- Stirling Sevens
  - Champions (1): 1984
- Greenock Sevens
  - Champions (6): 1960, 1961, 1962, 1973, 1978, 1986
- Ardrossan Sevens
  - Champions (1): 1965
- Edinburgh Northern Sevens
  - Champions (1): 1990, 1992, 1997

== Notable former players ==
=== British and Irish Lions ===
The following former Edinburgh Wanderers players have represented the British and Irish Lions.

- (Scotland) John Smith
- (Scotland) J. C. Hosack
- (Scotland) Alec Boswell Timms

=== Scotland internationalists ===
The following former Edinburgh Wanderers players have represented Scotland at full international level.

- (Scotland) Charles Villar
- (Scotland) Arthur Smith
- (Scotland) Ross Logan
- (Scotland) William Renwick
- (Scotland) Peter Gedge
- (Scotland) Ian Cordial
- (Scotland) Frank Fasson
- (Scotland) Bobby Clark
- (Scotland) Douglas Schulze
- (Scotland) Bill Gammell
- (Scotland) David Bedell-Sivright
- (Scotland) Alan Lawson
- (Scotland) Edward Innes Pocock
- (Scotland) Bob Gordon
- (Scotland) William Cowie
- (Scotland) William Holms
- (Scotland) Ronald Wright
- (Scotland) Grahame Budge
- (Scotland) A.R. Don-Wauchope
- (Scotland) Charlie Usher
- (Scotland) Henry Gedge
- (Scotland) Ken Dalgleish
- (Scotland) George Aitchison
- (Scotland) John MacDonald
- (Scotland) Andrew Drybrough
- (Scotland) James Gowans
- (Scotland) Ian Smith
- (Scotland) A. G. G. Asher
- (Scotland) D. K. A. MacKenzie
- (Scotland) James Reid
- (Scotland) Jock Wemyss
- (Scotland) Charles Fleming
- (Scotland) Thomas Begbie
- (Scotland) Charles Berry
- (Scotland) David Whyte

=== Notable non-Scottish players ===
The following is a list of notable non-Scottish international representative former Edinburgh Wanderers players:

- (England) Arthur Budd
- (Ireland) Mick Doyle
- (Wales) John Gwilliam
- (Wales) Idwal Rees

=== Edinburgh District players ===
The following former Edinburgh Wanderers players have represented Edinburgh District at provincial level.

- (Scotland) Charles Villar
- (Scotland) Bob Gordon
- (Scotland) Robert J.G. Taylor
- (Scotland) A. Ross
- (Scotland) Ken Dalgleish
- (Scotland) John MacDonald
- (Scotland) J. Forsyth
- (Scotland) Ian Cordial
- (Scotland) Ronald Wright
- (Scotland) A.R. Stewart
- (Scotland) William Cowie
- (Scotland) Charles Berry

=== Professional players ===
Professionalism began in rugby union in 1995 - and in Scotland it came a year later in 1996. These players went on from the Wanderers to professional teams:

- (Scotland) Murray Craig

=== Notable also outside of rugby ===
The following is a list of notable former Edinburgh Wanderers players who have achieved notability in fields outwith rugby:

- (Scotland) Roy Williamson - Songwriter and folk musician of The Corries

Lieutenant Colonel Wilfrith Elstob VC DSO MC, Commanding Officer of 16th Battalion Manchester Regiment

== SRU presidents ==
Former Edinburgh Wanderers players have been President of the SRU:

- 1889–90 Andrew Ramsay Don-Wauchope
- 1897–98 Robert Rainie
- 1899–1900 Ian MacIntyre
