= 1880–81 Home Nations rugby union matches =

International rugby union friendlies

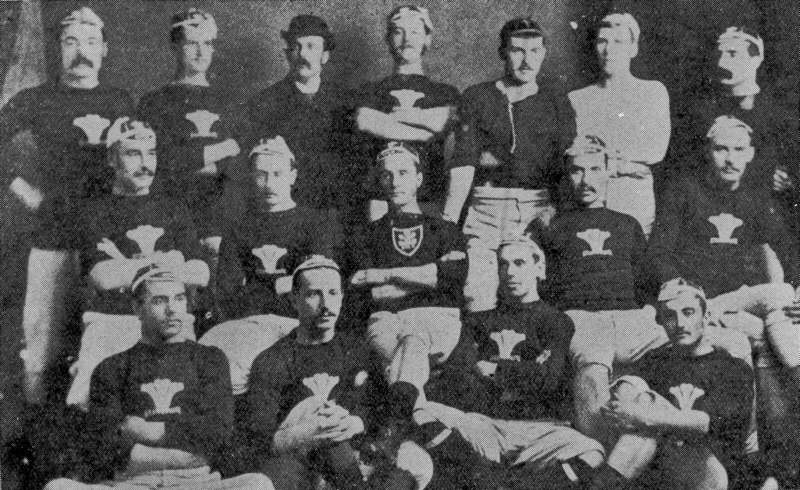
The first Welsh team to play an international rugby match, February 1881

The 1880–81 Home Nations rugby union matches were a series of international rugby union friendlies held between the England, Ireland, Scotland and Wales national rugby union teams. This season is most notable for the introduction of Wales as an international rugby union nation, playing their first ever match in a game against England. Although Wales were humiliated by a crushing defeat it did not stop rugby union being adopted by Wales as the country's national sport.

The only recognised competition held between the countries was the annual Calcutta Cup match, contested between England and Scotland. It was the third challenge for the Cup.

== Scoring system ==
The matches for this season were decided on goals scored. A goal was awarded for a successful conversion after a try, for a dropped goal or for a goal from mark. If a game was drawn, any unconverted tries were tallied to give a winner. If there was still no clear winner, the match was declared a draw.

== Matches ==
=== England vs. Ireland ===
5 February 1881

| England | 2G 2T – nil | Ireland |
| Try: Sawyer; Taylor (3); Con: Stokes (2) |

Whalley Range, Manchester
Referee: A. G. Guillemard (England)

England: A. N. Hornby (Manchester), C. M. Sawyer (Broughton), L Stokes (Blackheath) capt., WR Richardson (Manchester), HH Taylor (Blackheath), JI Ward (Richmond), CWL Fernandes (Leeds), Charles Gurdon (Richmond), C Phillips (Birkenhead Park), GF Vernon (Blackheath), JJ Ravenscroft (Birkenhead Park), George Burton (Blackheath), HC Rowley (Manchester), ET Gurdon (Richmond), WW Hewitt (Queen's House)

Ireland: T Harrison (Queen's College, Cork), W Peirce (Queen's College, Cork), WW Pike (Kingstown), HF Spunner (Tipperary), M Johnston (Dublin University), AJ Forrest (Dublin University) capt., DR Browning (Wanderers), JCS Burkitt (Queen's College, Cork), F Kennedy (Wanderers), HB Morell (Dublin University), WEA Cummins (Queen's College, Cork), WA Wallis (Dublin University), AR McMullen (Queen's College, Cork), G Scriven (Dublin University), H Purdon (NIFC)

England continued their experiment, which it began in 1880, of holding international matches in the North of England, after disappointing crowds in the South. England brought in five new caps, four into the pack, but it was their experienced backs of Hornby and Stokes that continued to cause their opponents the most problems. The game itself was one sided, with Henry Taylor scoring England's very first hat-trick of tries.

=== Ireland vs. Scotland ===
19 February 1881

| Ireland | 1DG – 1T | Scotland |
| Drop: Bagot | | Try: Graham |

Ormeau, Belfast
Referee: H.C. Kelly (Ireland)

Ireland: RE McLean(Dublin University), JC Bagot Lansdowne, WW Pike (Kingstown), HF Spunner (Tipperary), M Johnston (Dublin University), AJ Forrest (Dublin University) capt., DR Browning (Wanderers), JW Taylor (NIFC), J Johnston (Belfast Acads.), HB Morell (Dublin University), JA McDonald (Methodist College, Belfast), WA Wallis (Dublin University), AR McMullen (Queen's College, Cork), RW Hughes (NIFC), H Purdon (NIFC)

Scotland: Thomas Begbie (Edinburgh Wanderers), Bill Maclagan (Edinburgh Academical), Ninian Finlay (Edinburgh Academical), RC MacKenzie (Edinburgh Academical), Pat Smeaton (Edinburgh Academical), James Campbell (Glasgow Academical), David McCowan (West of Scotland), Charles Reid (Edinburgh Academical), David Cassels (West of Scotland), Gussie Graham (Edinburgh Academical) capt., Bryce Allan (Glasgow Academical), John Junor (Glasgow Academical), George Robb (Glasgow University), Archibald Walker (West of Scotland), John Blair Brown (Glasgow Academical)

With the Irish Rugby Football Union founded in 1879, and centres founded in Leinster, Munster and Ulster, a united Irish rugby-playing community celebrated their first international win with victory over Scotland. The Ireland dropped goal came from John Bagot, in his last appearance for his country. Despite the loss, Scotland showed the way forward by introducing a three-man three-quarter line for the first time at an international level; and also brought in Charles Reid, a teenager from Edinburgh Academy. Reid was the first schoolboy to play in a forward position in an international match.

=== England vs. Wales ===
19 February 1881

| England | 7G 6T 1DG – nil | Wales |
| Try: Budd; George Burton (4); Fernandes; Hunt; Rowley; Taylor; Twynam; Vassall (3); Con: Hunt; Stokes (6); Drop: Hunt |

Richardson's Field, Blackheath
Attendance: 4,000
Referee: A. G. Guillemard (England)

England: TW Fry (Queen's House), R Hunt (Manchester), L Stokes (Blackheath), capt., HT Twynam (Richmond), HH Taylor (Blackheath), Charles Plumpton Wilson (Cambridge University), CWL Fernandes (Leeds), Charles Gurdon (Richmond), A Budd (Blackheath), Harry Vassall (Oxford University), H Fowler (Walthamstow), George Burton (Blackheath), HC Rowley (Manchester), ET Gurdon (Richmond), WW Hewitt (Queen's House)

Wales: Charlie Newman (Newport), Richard Summers (Haverfordwest), James Bevan (Cambridge Uni. and Newport) capt., Edward Peake (Newport and Chepstow), Leonard Watkins (Llandaff and Cardiff), Edward John Lewis (Llandovery College), Barry Girling (Cardiff), Aneurin Rees (Llandovery College), Frank Purdon (Swansea) B. B. Mann (Cardiff), Edward Treharne (Cowbridge Grammar School and Pontypridd), Godfrey Darbishire (Bangor), William David Phillips (Cardiff), Richard Garnons Williams (Brecon and Newport), George Frederick Harding (Newport)

After the inability of the South Wales Football Union to successfully organise matches with teams from other countries, Richard Mullock, secretary of Newport Athletics Club, managed to arrange an international with the Rugby Football Union, between a Wales XV and England. With a date set, Mullock now needed an international team. The group of players brought together to form the very first Wales team were selected for their geographic spread, to appease as many regions of the country as possible; and their academic pedigree. Without first playing a trial game together, the team had little cohesion with players not only meeting for the first time, but with many also playing out of their normal position. Even with these problems, the result was still shocking, with the England team scoring 7 goals, 6 tries and a dropped goal to nil, 82-0 by modern scoring. One of the Welsh players was later reported as saying that the team was "...lucky to get nil."

The fallout from the match, saw hostile editorials and letters in the Welsh press. The SWFU distanced themselves from the match, stating that the Welsh team was a private enterprise conducted by Mullock; but when Mullock pushed forward to set up a Welsh union later that year the clubs went with him, preferring his positive style over the SWFU's inaction. The 12 March 1881 saw the creation of the Welsh Rugby Union, with Mullock installed as secretary.

=== Scotland vs. England ===
19 March 1881

| Scotland | 1G 1T – 1T 1DG | England |
| Try: Ainslie; Brown; Con: Begbie | | Try: Rowley; Drop: Stokes |

Raeburn Place, Edinburgh
Attendance: 12,000
Referee: DH Watson (Scotland)

Scotland: Thomas Begbie (Edinburgh Wanderers), Bill Maclagan (Edinburgh Academical), Ninian Finlay (Edinburgh Academical), RC MacKenzie (Glasgow Academical), Andrew Ramsay Don-Wauchope (Cambridge University), James Campbell (Glasgow Academical), Robert Ainslie (Edinburgh Inst. F.P.), Charles Reid (Edinburgh Academy), JW Fraiser (Edinburgh Inst. F.P.), JHS Graham (Edinburgh Academical) capt., D McCowan (West of Scotland), Robert Maitland (Edinburgh Inst. F.P.), Thomas Ainslie (Edinburgh Inst. F.P.), William Peterkin (Edinburgh University), JB Brown (Glasgow Academical)

England: A. N. Hornby (Manchester), R Hunt (Manchester), L Stokes (Blackheath) capt., HC Rowley (Manchester), FT Wright (Manchester)/(Edinburgh Academy), Charles Coates (Leeds), CWL Fernandes (Leeds), Charles Gurdon (Richmond), A Budd (Blackheath), Harry Vassall (Oxford University), H Fowler (Walthamstow), George Burton (Blackheath), WW Hewitt (Queen's House), ET Gurdon (Richmond), C Phillips (Birkenhead Park)

The third contest for the Calcutta Cup ended in a draw with a goal and a try scored by both sides. Edinburgh Academy had the distinction of supplying a player on both sides during the game, with Charles Reid representing Scotland, and Frank Wright being drafted into the England squad when the team turned up a player short, when one of their players missed the train. The match was also notable for being the last international game for Lennard Stokes, who retired from rugby to concentrate on his medical career.

== Bibliography ==
- Smith, David; Williams, Gareth (1980). Fields of Praise: The Official History of The Welsh Rugby Union. Cardiff: University of Wales Press. ISBN 0-7083-0766-3.
- Griffiths, John (1987). The Phoenix Book of International Rugby Records. London: Phoenix House. ISBN 0-460-07003-7.
