= 1878–79 Home Nations rugby union matches =

The 1878–79 Home Nations rugby union matches are a series of international friendlies held between the England, Ireland and Scotland national rugby union teams. The only recognised competition held between the countries was the inaugural Calcutta Cup match, contested between England and Scotland. It was the first challenge for the Cup, and ended in an unspectacular draw.

== Scoring system ==
The matches for this season were decided on goals scored. A goal was awarded for a successful conversion after a try, for a dropped goal or for a goal from mark. If a game was drawn, any unconverted tries were tallied to give a winner. If there was still no clear winner, the match was declared a draw.

== Matches ==
=== Ireland vs. Scotland ===
17 February 1879

Ireland	nil – 1G, 1DG, 1T	Scotland
		Try: Brown; Somerville; Con: Cross; Drop: Cross

Ormeau, Belfast
Referee: J Chiene (Scotland)

Ireland: RB Walkington, T Harrison, JC Bagot, RN Matier, AM Whitestone, WJ Goulding, WEA Cummins, AM Archer, HC Kelly, W Finaly, JA McDonald, JW Taylor, WC Neville capt., G Scriven, H Purdon

Scotland: Bill Maclagan, Malcolm Cross, Ninian Finlay, WH Masters, James Campbell, Robert Ainslie, DR Irvine, JB Brown, D. Somerville, RW Irvine capt., AG Petrie, JHS Graham, Henry Melville Napier, NT Brewis, ER Smith

=== Scotland vs. England ===
10 March 1879

Scotland	1DG–1G	England
Drop: Finlay		Try: Burton; Con: Stokes

Raeburn Place, Edinburgh
Attendance: 10,000
Referee: GR Fleming (Scotland)

Scotland: Bill Maclagan, Malcolm Cross, Ninian Finlay, John Alexander Neilson, James Campbell, Robert Ainslie, Duncan Irvine, JB Brown, EN Ewart, RW Irvine capt., AG Petrie, JHS Graham, Henry Melville Napier, NT Brewis, JE Junor

England: WJ Penny, H Huth (Huddersfield), L Stokes, WAD Evanson, HH Taylor, HH Springman, S Neame, Frank Reginald Adams capt., FD Fowler, A Budd, G Harrison (Hull), George Burton, HC Rowley, Roger Walker, NF McLeod

=== England vs. Ireland ===
24 March 1879

England	2G 2T 1DG–nil	Ireland
Try: Adams; Evanson; Rowley; Twynam; Con: Stokes (2); Drop: Stokes

Kennington Oval, London
Referee: A. G. Guillemard (England)

England: WJ Penny, WAD Evanson, L Stokes, HT Twynam, WE Openshaw, Harold Dingwall Bateson, S Neame, Frank Reginald Adams capt:, JM Biggs, A Budd, G Harrison (Hull), GW Burton, HC Rowley, Edward Temple Gurdon, NF McLeod

Ireland: WW Pike, WJ Willis, JC Bagot, J Heron, AM Whistestone, BN Casement, JR Bristow, F Schute, HW Murray, W Finaly, JJ Keon, JL Cuppaidge, WC Neville capt., G Scriven, H Purdon

== Bibliography ==
- Griffiths, John (1987). The Phoenix Book of International Rugby Records. London: Phoenix House. ISBN 0-460-07003-7.
