= England rugby union try record progression =

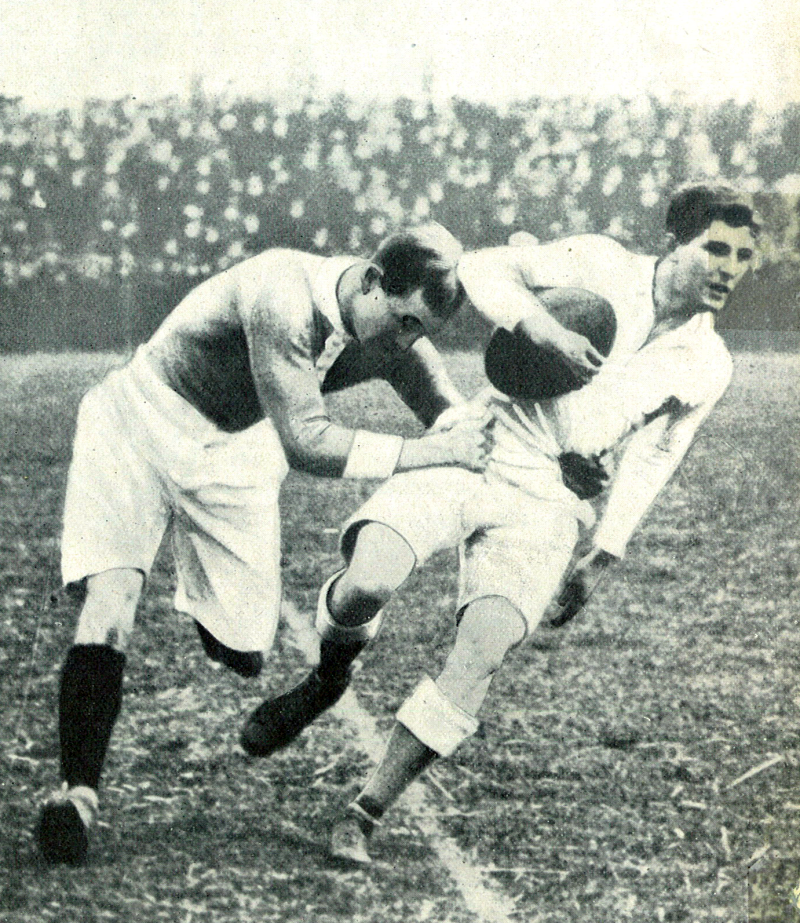
Cyril Lowe, England's record try scorer from 1920 to 1989, tackled by Dedet in 1913 vs France

The England rugby union try record progression charts the record number of tries scored for the England national rugby union team by individual players, or rugby footballers as they are still sometimes referred to.

== Early years ==
The progression begins with Reg Birkett's try, scored in the first international rugby match of any code in 1871 when England succumbed to Scotland at Raeburn Place. When Birkett's try was scored, it was not worth any points in itself, but rather afforded the opportunity of the scoring side to kick a goal, or a "try at goal", which England failed to convert. Birkett, who also played association football for England, was for a short time during the match the joint international record holder as well, matching Angus Buchanan's earlier effort for Scotland. Despite the record being but a single try, Birkett's mark of one try for England stood for almost six years, although this equated at the time to just ten matches. In that time, at least a further eleven players matched the feat of scoring a try for England before William Hutchinson scored his second try of the match and his career in the eleventh England match on 5 February 1877. Hutchinson set a mark that was to last for exactly four years when Henry Taylor, who had already equalled the record, scored three times against Ireland on 5 February 1881. Taylor played in the same side as another prolific scorer of tries, George Burton. Burton equalled the mark of five tries in England's comprehensive victory over Wales in the latter's first international. In that match, on 19 February 1881, of the 13 tries scored, Taylor scored once but Burton scored four times, which was in itself a record haul for one match that was to last until 1907. The tries scored in this match brought both players to six apiece, but as to which of these players reached that mark first is unclear. It was not until 1885 that another pairing of prolific try scorers, Wilfred Bolton and Charles Wade, both equalled the haul of six tries. Wade went on to hold the record outright for over 15 years after he scored his seventh try on 2 January 1886 against Wales. It was Tot Robinson that was to break this record on 9 March 1901 with his mark of eight tries and no one challenged this until Arthur Hudson equalled and then broke it at Parc des Princes when England defeated France on 3 March 1910. For the third time, England was fielding a pairing of prolific try scorers, and alongside Hudson was John Birkett. John Birkett was the son of England's first try scorer, Reg Birkett and had scored the first try at Twickenham Stadium. He went on to set the England record with ten tries on 8 April 1912.

== Lowe's 67-year record ==
As Birkett's career finished, the young winger, Cyril Lowe, began his. Lowe was selected to play for England whilst still at university in 1913 and despite a six-year break due to the First World War when he flew as a fighter pilot in the Royal Flying Corps, returned to international duty and resumed scoring tries. Lowe scored 18 times in 24 appearances, and set the record for the most tries scored in a single Five Nations Championship when he scored eight in 1914, a record only matched by Ian Smith of Scotland, and never surpassed, even in the Six Nations era with its greater number of matches. Despite living until the age of 91, Lowe's mark of 18 tries, set on 10 February 1923, outlasted him and was not broken until another RAF fighter pilot, Rory Underwood, scored his 19th try almost 67 years later on 20 January 1990. Underwood had taken 38 matches to reach this mark, compared to Lowe's 24. Before Lowe, other try scorers had had better scoring ratios, among them record holders Burton scoring six in six, Wade seven in eight, Tot Robinson eight in eight, and Hudson, nine in eight. Daniel Lambert had also scored eight tries in a career of seven appearances. Lowe's achievement has been singled out as being all the more remarkable due to the almost six year pause in the middle of his career.

== Underwood's unchallenged record ==
Underwood went on to score 30 more tries for England over a career spanning 12 years and 85 matches, eventually setting a mark of 49 tries. He also scored once for the British Lions, bringing his career total of international tries to 50. Lowe's total of 18 has been surpassed by a further six players, all playing in an era of many more internationals, and when tries are worth more points relative to other scoring methods and therefore where there is more emphasis on scoring tries. Underwood's mark, however, has never been challenged, the next closest for England being Jonny May on 36.

== International tries ==
Try record	Player	Opposing team	Location	Venue	Competition	Date	Result	References /Notes
1	Reg Birkett	Scotland	Edinburgh, Scotland	Raeburn Place	Home nations friendly	27 March 1871	Lost	
1	Francis d'Aguilar	Scotland	London, England	Kennington Oval	Home nations friendly	5 February 1872	Won	
1	Stephen Finney	Scotland	London, England	Kennington Oval	Home nations friendly	5 February 1872	Won	
1	Alfred St. George Hamersley	Scotland	London, England	Kennington Oval	Home nations friendly	5 February 1872	Won	
1	Ernest Cheston	Ireland	London, England	Kennington Oval	Home nations friendly	15 February 1875	Won	
1	Arthur Michell	Ireland	London, England	Kennington Oval	Home nations friendly	15 February 1875	Won	
1	Charles Clark	Ireland	Dublin, Ireland	Leinster Cricket Ground	Home nations friendly	13 December 1875	Won	
1	Edward Kewley	Ireland	Dublin, Ireland	Leinster Cricket Ground	Home nations friendly	13 December 1875	Won	
1	William Collins	Scotland	London, England	Kennington Oval	Home nations friendly	6 March 1876	Won	
1	Frederic Lee	Scotland	London, England	Kennington Oval	Home nations friendly	6 March 1876	Won	
1	William Hutchinson	Ireland	London, England	Kennington Oval	Home nations friendly	5 February 1877	Won	
1	Monkey Hornby	Ireland	London, England	Kennington Oval	Home nations friendly	5 February 1877	Won	
1	Frank Reginald Adams	Ireland	London, England	Kennington Oval	Home nations friendly	5 February 1877	Won	
2	William Hutchinson	Ireland	London, England	Kennington Oval	Home nations friendly	5 February 1877	Won	
2	Frank Reginald Adams	Ireland	London, England	Kennington Oval	Home nations friendly	24 March 1879	Won	
2	George Burton	Scotland	Manchester, England	Whalley Range	Home nations friendly	28 February 1880	Won	
2	Henry Taylor	Scotland	Manchester, England	Whalley Range	Home nations friendly	28 February 1880	Won	
3	Henry Taylor	Ireland	Manchester, England	Whalley Range	1880–81 Home Nations rugby union matches	5 February 1881	Won	
4	Henry Taylor	Ireland	Manchester, England	Whalley Range	1880–81 Home Nations rugby union matches	5 February 1881	Won	
5	Henry Taylor	Ireland	Manchester, England	Whalley Range	1880–81 Home Nations rugby union matches	5 February 1881	Won	
5	George Burton	Wales	London, England	Richardson's Field, Blackheath	1880–81 Home Nations rugby union matches	19 February 1881	Won	
6	Henry Taylor	Wales	London, England	Richardson's Field, Blackheath	1880–81 Home Nations rugby union matches	19 February 1881	Won	
6	George Burton	Wales	London, England	Richardson's Field, Blackheath	1880–81 Home Nations rugby union matches	19 February 1881	Won	
6	Charles Wade	Wales	Swansea, Wales	St. Helen's Rugby and Cricket Ground	Home Nations Championship	3 January 1885	Won	
6	Wilfred Bolton	Ireland	Manchester, England	Whalley Range	Home Nations Championship	7 February 1885	Won	
7	Charles Wade	Wales	London, England	Rectory Field, Blackheath	Home Nations Championship	2 January 1886	Won	
7	Tot Robinson	Ireland	Dublin, Ireland	Lansdowne Road	Home Nations Championship	9 February 1901	Lost	
8	Tot Robinson	Scotland	London, England	Rectory Field, Blackheath	Home Nations Championship	9 March 1901	Lost	
8	Arthur Hudson	France	Paris, France	Parc des Princes	Five Nations Championship	3 March 1910	Won	
9	Arthur Hudson	France	Paris, France	Parc des Princes	Five Nations Championship	3 March 1910	Won	
9	John Birkett	Ireland	Twickenham, England	Twickenham	Five Nations Championship	10 February 1912	Won	
10	John Birkett	France	Paris, France	Parc des Princes	Five Nations Championship	8 April 1912	Won	
10	Cyril Lowe	Scotland	Twickenham, England	Twickenham	Five Nations Championship	20 March 1920	Won	
11	Cyril Lowe	Wales	Twickenham, England	Twickenham	Five Nations Championship	15 January 1921	Won	
12	Cyril Lowe	Ireland	Twickenham, England	Twickenham	Five Nations Championship	12 February 1921	Won	
13	Cyril Lowe	France	Colombes near Paris, France	Stade du Matin	Five Nations Championship	28 March 1921	Won	
14	Cyril Lowe	Wales	Cardiff, Wales	Cardiff Arms Park	Five Nations Championship	21 January 1922	Lost	
15	Cyril Lowe	Ireland	Dublin, Ireland	Lansdowne Road	Five Nations Championship	11 February 1922	Won	
16	Cyril Lowe	Scotland	Twickenham, England	Twickenham	Five Nations Championship	18 March 1922	Won	
17	Cyril Lowe	Scotland	Twickenham, England	Twickenham	Five Nations Championship	18 March 1922	Won	
18	Cyril Lowe	Ireland	Leicester, England	Welford Road Stadium	Five Nations Championship	10 February 1923	Won	
18	Rory Underwood	Fiji	Twickenham, England	Twickenham	Test match (1989 Fiji rugby union tour of Europe)	4 November 1989	won	
19	Rory Underwood	Ireland	Twickenham, England	Twickenham	Five Nations Championship	20 January 1990	won	
20	Rory Underwood	France	Paris, France	Parc des Princes	Five Nations Championship	3 February 1990	won	
21	Rory Underwood	Wales	Twickenham, England	Twickenham	Five Nations Championship	17 February 1990	won	
22	Rory Underwood	Wales	Twickenham, England	Twickenham	Five Nations Championship	17 February 1990	won	
23	Rory Underwood	Argentina	Twickenham, England	Twickenham	Test match (1990 Argentina rugby union tour of British Isles)	3 November 1990	won	
24	Rory Underwood	Argentina	Twickenham, England	Twickenham	Test match (1990 Argentina rugby union tour of British Isles)	3 November 1990	won	
25	Rory Underwood	Argentina	Twickenham, England	Twickenham	Test match (1990 Argentina rugby union tour of British Isles)	3 November 1990	won	
26	Rory Underwood	Ireland	Dublin, Ireland	Lansdowne Road	Five Nations Championship	2 March 1991	won	
27	Rory Underwood	France	Twickenham, England	Twickenham	Five Nations Championship	16 March 1991	won	
28	Rory Underwood	Fiji	Suva, Fiji	National Stadium, Suva	Summer Tour	20 July 1991	won	
29	Rory Underwood	Italy	Twickenham, England	Twickenham	Rugby World Cup	8 October 1991	won	
30	Rory Underwood	United States	Twickenham, England	Twickenham	Rugby World Cup	11 October 1991	won	
31	Rory Underwood	United States	Twickenham, England	Twickenham	Rugby World Cup	11 October 1991	won	
32	Rory Underwood	France	Paris, France	Parc des Princes	Rugby World Cup	19 October 1991	won	
33	Rory Underwood	Scotland	Edinburgh, Scotland	Murrayfield	Five Nations Championship	18 January 1992	won	
34	Rory Underwood	Ireland	Twickenham, England	Twickenham	Five Nations Championship	1 February 1992	won	
35	Rory Underwood	France	Paris, France	Parc des Princes	Five Nations Championship	15 February 1992	won	
36	Rory Underwood	Scotland	Twickenham, England	Twickenham	Five Nations Championship	6 March 1993	won	
37	Rory Underwood	Wales	Twickenham, England	Twickenham	Five Nations Championship	19 March 1994	won	
38	Rory Underwood	Romania	Twickenham, England	Twickenham	Autumn Internationals	12 November 1994	won	
39	Rory Underwood	Canada	Twickenham, England	Twickenham	Test Match (1994 Canada rugby union tour of England and France)	10 December 1994	won	
40	Rory Underwood	Canada	Twickenham, England	Twickenham	Test Match (1994 Canada rugby union tour of England and France)	10 December 1994	won	
41	Rory Underwood	Wales	Cardiff, Wales	Cardiff Arms Park	Five Nations Championship	18 February 1995	won	
42	Rory Underwood	Wales	Cardiff, Wales	Cardiff Arms Park	Five Nations Championship	18 February 1995	won	
43	Rory Underwood	Italy	Durban, South Africa	Kings Park Stadium	Rugby World Cup	31 May 1995	won	
44	Rory Underwood	Western Samoa	Durban, South Africa	Kings Park Stadium	Rugby World Cup	4 June 1995	won	
45	Rory Underwood	Western Samoa	Durban, South Africa	Kings Park Stadium	Rugby World Cup	4 June 1995	won	
46	Rory Underwood	New Zealand	Cape Town, South Africa	Newlands Stadium	Rugby World Cup	18 June 1995	lost	
47	Rory Underwood	New Zealand	Cape Town, South Africa	Newlands Stadium	Rugby World Cup	18 June 1995	lost	
48	Rory Underwood	Western Samoa	Twickenham, England	Twickenham	Test Match (1995 Western Samoa rugby union tour of Great Britain)	16 December 1995	won	
49	Rory Underwood	Wales	Twickenham, England	Twickenham	Five Nations Championship	3 February 1996	won	

== See also ==
- List of top England international rugby union points scorers and try scorers
