= Charles Gurdon =

English barrister, judge, rower and rugby union player

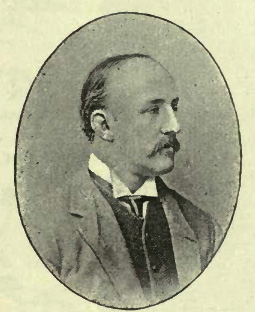
- Born: Charles Gurdon; 3 December 1855 Norfolk, England
- Died: 26 June 1931 (aged 75) London, England
- School: Haileybury School
- University: Jesus College, Cambridge

Rugby union career
- Position: Forward
Amateur team(s)
Years	Team	Apps	(Points)
- Cambridge University R.U.F.C.
–	Richmond F.C.		
International career
Years	Team	Apps	(Points)
1880–1886	England	14	(0)

Charles Gurdon (3 December 1855 – 26 June 1931) was an English barrister, judge, rower and rugby union forward who played club rugby for Cambridge University and Richmond. Gurdon represented England fourteen times during the early development of international rugby union, once as captain. He and his brother Edward Temple Gurdon formed one of the most notable sibling pairings in English rugby.

== Life and legal career ==
Gurdon was born in Barnham Broom, Norfolk, in 1855, the second son of Rev Edward Gurdon. He was educated at Haileybury School before matriculating to Jesus College, Cambridge, in 1874. He was a member of the Pitt Club at Cambridge. His elder brother Edward Temple and younger brother Francis also studied at Cambridge; Francis entered the clergy, becoming the Bishop of Hull.

Gurdon chose to enter the legal profession and was admitted to the Inner Temple in 1877. He received his BA in 1878, and was called to the Bar in 1881. From 1923 to 1929 he was a County Court judge for Cornwall, before retiring to London. He died suddenly on 26 June 1931.

== Sporting career ==
Gurdon was keen sportsman from a young age. At Cambridge he was a member of both the rugby club and Cambridge University Boat Club and won five sporting Blues. He won four Blues for rowing in the Boat Race in 1876, 1877, 1878 and 1879 with two Cambridge wins in 1876 and 1879 and the only dead heat in 1877. In 1879 he was a member of the Jesus College eight which won the Grand Challenge Cup and the coxless four which won the Stewards' Challenge Cup at Henley Royal Regatta. Gurdon gained one Blue for playing in the Varsity Match in 1877. His brother Edward had won three Blues the previous three seasons in the Varsity Match, and Gurdon followed his brother in representing Cambridge. Oxford were the stronger team throughout the season, Cambridge played with just five members with prior Varsity Match experience and Oxford won by two tries to nil. On leaving University, Gurdon joined first-class English club team Richmond.

Gurdon was first chosen to represent England during the 1879–80 season. By this time, his brother Edward had already gained two caps but was unavailable for Gurdon's first international, which was played away against Ireland. Gurdon was reselected for the very next international and for the first time, the brothers played in the same pack for England, Edward scoring a try in a heavy defeat of Scotland. The brothers would play a total of ten matches together as England teammates, from 1880 through to 1886.

Gurdon next played in all three England internationals of the 1880–81 season, which began with a win over Ireland at Manchester, followed by a crushing victory over Wales in the first Welsh international rugby match. The season ended with an away draw with Scotland. England played in just two games during 1881–82 and Gurdon played in both, bringing his consecutive matches for England to seven. His sixth match, against Ireland at Lansdowne Road, was notable as the one and only time that Gurdon was given the captaincy of the England national team. The seventh match was also the first time Gurdon had appeared on a losing England team, with Scotland beating England by two tries to nil to take the Calcutta Cup for the first time in four attempts.

The next year saw the first Home Nations Championship, with all the Home Nations competing for the title. Gurdon missed the first two encounters, but was in the team for the final England game of the tournament away to Scotland. Under the captaincy of his brother Edward, England had won the first two games against Ireland and Wales, leaving the match with Scotland as the Championship decider. In a tight and exciting game England narrowly won, taking the title, Calcutta Cup and the very first Triple Crown.

Gurdon returned for the 1884 Home Nations Championship, and under the captaincy of his brother, he played in the first and third games of the tournament; England taking the Triple Crown for the second year in succession. Gurdon played in four more matches for England, playing once in the 1885 Home Nations Championship and then all three games of the 1886 Championship. Gurdon played his last international game in 1886 to Scotland, which was also his brother's final game.

== See also ==
- List of Cambridge University Boat Race crews

== Bibliography ==
- Godwin, Terry (1984). The International Rugby Championship 1883–1983. London: Willow Books. ISBN 0-00-218060-X.
- Griffiths, John (1982). The Book of English International Rugby 1872–1982. London: Willow Books. ISBN 0002180065.
- Marshall, Howard; Jordon, J.P. (1951). Oxford v Cambridge, The Story of the University Rugby Match. London: Clerke & Cockeran.

Rugby Union Captain
Preceded by Lennard Stokes	English National Rugby Union Captain; Feb 1882	Succeeded by A. N. Hornby
