= Neame =

Neame is a surname which may refer to:

- Basil Neame (1921–2010), English fruit grower
- Christopher Neame (born 1947), English actor
- Christopher Neame (writer/producer) (1942–2011), British film producer and screenwriter
- Douglas Neame (1901–1988), English hurdler
- Gareth Neame (born 1967), British television producer and executive
- Ivo Neame (born 1981), British jazz pianist and saxophonist
- Philip Neame (1888–1978), British Army lieutenant general and recipient of the Victoria Cross
- Rex Neame (1936–2008), English cricketer
- Ronald Neame (1911–2010), English film cinematographer, producer, screenwriter and director
- Stuart Neame (1856–1936), rugby union international who represented England from 1879 to 1880
