= Charles Reid (rugby union) =

Scotland international rugby union player

- Born: Charles Reid; 14 January 1864 Lochwinnoch, Scotland
- Died: 25 October 1909 (aged 45) London, England

Rugby union career
- Position: Forward
Amateur team(s)
Years	Team	Apps	(Points)
- Edinburgh Academicals
–	Perthshire		
Provincial / State sides
Years	Team	Apps	(Points)
1880	Edinburgh District		
1881	East of Scotland District		
International career
Years	Team	Apps	(Points)
1881-88	Scotland	21	

Charles Reid (14 January 1864 – 25 October 1909) was a Scotland international rugby union player.

== Rugby union career ==
=== Amateur career ===
Reid attended Edinburgh Academy, and played rugby union for the Edinburgh Academicals. He was still a schoolboy of the academy when first capped by Scotland. In the match against England in 1881, he played against his classmate Frank Wright at Raeburn Place. Frank Wright was also seventeen at the time but – as a boarder from Manchester – represented the England side. At the end of the match, both of the boys were carried on the shoulders of their fans back to Edinburgh Academy. He acquired a nickname of Hippo at the school; this does not refer to his being like a hippopotamus, but the fact that he did not know the word for a horse, when asked once in an Ancient Greek class at the Edinburgh Academy.

After his schooling, he still played for Edinburgh Academicals.

He later played for Perthshire.

=== Provincial career ===
He played for Edinburgh District in the inter-city match against Glasgow District in 1880.

He later turned out for East of Scotland District that same season in their match against West of Scotland District in 1881.

=== International career ===
He was capped twenty-one times for Scotland between 1881 and 1888. Reid vies with Ninian Finlay for the title of the youngest player ever to be capped for Scotland - he was seventeen years and thirty six days old when he was capped against Ireland on 19 February 1881; however, Reid had lived through an extra leap year day, when he was capped in 1881, so Finlay generally gets that title. He played at second row/lock.

As Allan Massie says,

Charles Reid's physique would never have appeared inadequate for any forward position; he was bigger than Ireland's Tom Reid who was the biggest and heaviest forward the British Lions took to South Africa in 1955, and more or less the same height and weight as the great Willie John McBride.

Reid was 15 to 16 stone in weight, and 6 ft 3in. The first historian of Scottish rugby, R.J. Phillips says that Reid "carried no superfluous weight and was as active as a well-trained ten-stone man", but that also, from his viewpoint in the 1920s, he was "Scotland's greatest forward."

He played alongside some of the greats of the era including Ninian Finlay, Andrew Don Wauchope and Bill Maclagan. He was said to be a proficient tackler, excellent at dribbling and Scotland only lost four times in his twenty one caps. He captained Scotland in 1887 to their first Home Championship win, and also won scored tries.

He maintained an interest in rugby long after retiring from the game, and after the positional changes in the early 1890s, he wrote boldly:

Give me a forward team like we had in Manchester in 1882, and I don't care how many threequarter backs you have; we could go through them. We dribbled very close, and backed up the other so well that they could not get away, and they had fliers like Bolton against us. Dribbling and tackling are the characteristics of the Scottish forwards, and on them we depend to win.

However, Massie disagrees with this statement, and says that over-dependence on aggressive forward play such as that supported by Reid led to European sides being beaten thoroughly by New Zealand and South Africa when they toured.

Outside of rugby Reid was also a noted exponent of the shot put. At the inaugural Scottish Athletics Championships in 1883 he placed third in the event, was second in 1884 and 1885, becoming Scottish champion in both 1886 and 1887.

== Medical career ==
He was a doctor by profession, and practised in Selkirk. He then lived at Craigie for several years, and moved to Swindon in 1903 where he went into partnership with Dr. J. Campbell Maclean.

== Family ==
He was the brother of James Reid, who was capped five times for Scotland from 1871 to 1875, including the very first rugby international. He was married in Swindon, however this was short lived, as his wife died 18 months later.

== Death ==
Reid had started to suffer from ill health whist in Selkirk. He died in a surgical home in London after several operations. His body was returned to Swindon and was buried in the same plot as his wife in Radnor Street Cemetery on 29 October 1909.
