= J. A. Campbell =

J. A. Campbell may refer to:

- John Argentine Campbell (died 1917), Scottish rugby player
- James Campbell (rugby union) (James Alexander Campbell, 1858–1902), Canadian-born rugby player who represented Scotland
- John Allen Campbell (1835–1880), first Governor of the Wyoming Territory
- James Archibald Campbell (1862–1934), founder of Campbell University
- Jonathan A. Campbell (born 1947), American herpetologist

== See also ==
- Campbell (surname)
