= Alexander William Pearson =

England international rugby union player

Alec Pearson
- Born: Alexander William Pearson; 30 November 1853 Mount Ridley, Kalkallo, Colony of Victoria
- Died: 27 January 1930 (aged 76) Dandenong, Victoria
- School: Blackheath Proprietary School
- University: Guy's Hospital Medical School

Rugby union career
- Position: Fullback
Senior career
Years	Team	Apps	(Points)
1873–1878	Blackheath F.C.		
1873–1877	Guy's Hospital		
International career
Years	Team	Apps	(Points)
1875–1878	England	7	

Alexander William Pearson (30 November 1853 – 27 January 1930) was a rugby union international who represented England from 1875 to 1878. He was described as late as 1925 as "about as fíne a full back as ever played", and was the first Australian born rugby union international.

== Early life and family ==
Alexander William Pearson was born in 1854 as the son of Captain James Pearson by his second marriage to Augusta Sarah Godfrey. Alexander's father, James, had been born on 12 June 1799 in Furris, Kincardine, Scotland, himself the son of Peter Patrick and Elizabeth (née Pride) Pearson. Having worked in a Liverpool shipping office James ran away to sea, voyaging to China and India and by the age of 29 was the Captain of the 'Lady of the Lake", chartered by the British Government in March 1829 to deliver a consignment of female prisoners to Hobart, Van Diemens Land. Captain Pearson stayed in the colony of New South Wales, and met and married Jane Mackey of Sydney at St. James Church, Sydney on 27 June 1835. The following April, Alec's older half brother Jamie was born, but died of dysentery before reaching 6 months of age. Then on 27 March 1838, on older half sister, Janet, was born, and christened in Calcutta. The following year, in Perth, a third older half-brother was born in November. However, James was widowed shortly afterward as Jane died on 25 November 1839 and a few days later on 3 December James' newborn son also died. Alec's only remaining half-sibling from his father's first marriage, Janet, also died an infant, in June 1841. Having lost his entire family, James resumed his voyaging and at the end of 1842, undertook a Leasing Arrangement in Melbourne in the Parish of Kalkallo, on the crest of Kinlochewe Hill. On 30 June 1846, James married Augusta Sarah Godfrey, the daughter of John Race Godfrey, a Royal Navy captain. The marriage took place at St. Petrox Church, Dartmouth, Devon. Immediately, the couple began preparations to sail to Port Phillip District, along with Augusta's 18-year-old cousin Frederick Race Godfrey (1826–1910). Augusta was pregnant on the voyage and in Port Philip Alec's older sister, Augusta Janet, was born on 12 April 1847. Captain Pearson then purchased a total holding of 1547 acres in the parish of Yuroke. He also bought his previously leased Kinloch Hill property and renamed the geographical feature "Mt. Ridley" after a rocky outcrop behind Augusta's family house in Dartmouth, Devonshire. On 22 August 1848, Alec's older brother, James Godfrey Pearson was born in Melbourne. In April 1850, another older brother, Freddy, was born in Melbourne. However he died on 3 March 1851. Emily Lillias was born, on 24 December 1851. In 1854 Alexander William was born at Mount Ridley, the first of the children to be born at the house. The following year his younger sister, Caroline Maria Josephine was born.

In 1858 the Pearsons left for England to educate their sons, as was the common practice for pastoralists. During their time in England, two more of Alec's siblings were born, David Chambers Pearson in 1860, and Blanche Alice in 1862, both in Suffolk, England whilst the family were residing at Hemingstone Hall, Needham Market, Suffolk.

Alec and his older brother were educated at the Blackheath Proprietary School, London, from 1864 to 1869. From 1873 he was registered as a first year student at Guy's Hospital. However, that there is no account of his having paid his fees nor are there records of his having attended any courses or entering any examinations. Another English international, fellow member at Blackheath and contemporary of Alec at Guy's, Dr Lennard Stokes, wrote that Perason "never did any work at Guy's and only entered to play in the cup ties".

== Rugby union career ==
Alec Pearson played rugby for Guy's hospital from 1873 to 1877, his first match being in the 1873/1874 season against the Clapham Rovers. In this season he was selected to take part in the All-England trial games in February 1874. He was also key in Guy's win over St George's Hospital in the first ever fínal of the Hospitals Cup in 1875. In this period, his loyalty appeared to be with Guy's as he played for them against Blackheath in March 1875, whilst his brother played for Blackheath. However, at other points in the season he also played for Blackheath, which having been originally set up as a team to represent old boys from Blackheath Proprietary School, was a natural choice for him. In 1877 though, in a later Guy's vs Blackheath confrontation, he played for Blackheath. When not playing for Guy's Alec was known to have not only assisted Blackheath as a player but also became Honorary Secretary and Treasurer of the club in 1875–76, 76–77 and 1877–78. He played 14 games for Blackheath in 1877/78 and then left for Australia in the 1880s to farm his family estate, his brother having already left for Australia in 1875. As an international, he made his debut on 15 February 1875 at The Oval in the England vs Ireland match. and his final appearance for England on 11 March 1878 at Lansdowne Road in the Ireland vs England match. His contemporary, Lennard Stokes, in 1925 described Alec Pearson as "about as fíne a full back as ever played, beautiful drop and place kick and dead sure tackle".

== Later life ==
Alexander returned to Australia to run the 'Mt. Ridley" and "Wheatlands" property. His mother's cousin, Frederick Race Godfrey, had leased the property from 1858 to 1875, and in 1875 James Godfrey Pearson the eldest son of the Captain returned to Australia, later joined by Alec. Mount Ridley was sold out of the family and out of the Pearson name in 1885, and would almost a century later by revived for the purposes of the film industry as a set. Notably, scenes for Mad Max and Squizzy Taylor were filmed on the premises and in the extensive grounds.
