= Harry Vassall =

England international rugby union player

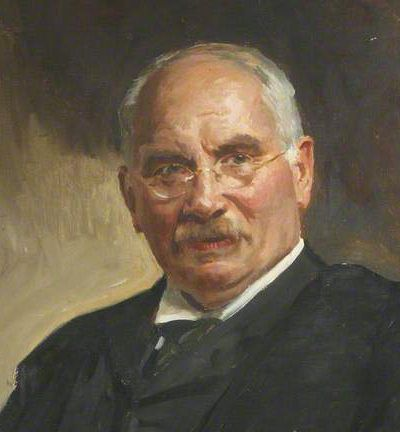
- Vassall as Master of Repton School, 1925
- Born: Harry Vassall; 22 October 1860 Barwick in Elmet, Tadcaster, England
- Died: 5 January 1926 (aged 65) England
- Weight: 99.5 kg (15 st 9 lb)
- School: Marlborough College
- University: Hertford College, Oxford
- Notable relative(s): Henry Vassall, (nephew)

Rugby union career
- Position: Forward
Amateur team(s)
Years	Team	Apps	(Points)
- Yeovil
–	Oxford University RFC		
–	Marlborough Nomads		
–	Blackheath F.C.		
–	Somerset		
International career
Years	Team	Apps	(Points)
1881–1883	England	5	(0)

Henry Vassall (22 October 1860 – 5 January 1926) was an English rugby union player, writer, and master of Repton School, Derbyshire. He was best known as a centre for Oxford University. Vassall played international rugby for England in the early years of the sport, winning five caps and scoring a hat-trick of tries in the first encounter between England and Wales.

While at Oxford University Vassall led the university rugby side to 70 matches without defeat during his three-year captaincy. His belief that the forward players should work in unison with their backs was revolutionary to the game of rugby and changed the way that rugby was played at club and country level. He is recognised as one of the most important figures in the early development of the sport.

== Early life ==
Henry Vassall was born at Bramley Grange in Barwick in Elmet, Yorkshire, the home of his maternal grandfather, on 22 October 1860. His parents, William and Martha Ann, had travelled there from Hardington Mandeville in Somerset, where his father was Rector.

His father, William Vassall, was well educated and academically gifted. In 1844, he won a scholarship to St John’s College, Cambridge, and in 1847, a “Travelling Bachelor” scholarship. After taking Holy Orders, he served as curate of Church Fenton in Yorkshire from 1851 until 1853, and Rector of Hardington Mandeville from 1856 until his death in 1883. While he was at Church Fenton, he met Martha Skelton, his future wife.

Martha’s family belonged to the commercial elite of Leeds society. Her father, William Dinsely Skelton, was a partner in the firm of Hives and Atkinson, flax spinners, of Bank Mills, Leeds. As an employer of nearly one thousand workers, he was one of four mill owners chosen in 1854 to meet Lord Palmerston to discuss factory safety. Skelton was also active in the city's political, cultural, and religious life. At a time when religious Nonconformity in the city was strong, he was a supporter of the Established Church, serving as churchwarden of St Mark’s Church, Woodhouse, and trustee of the advowson of Leeds Parish Church.

On 15 April 1857, William and Martha married at Barwick in Elmet, when William was 33 and Martha was 17. They were to have six daughters and nine sons, of whom Henry was their third child.

Henry spent his early years at Hardington Mandeville before going to Marlborough College from August 1871 to December 1878. He then matriculated at Hertford College, Oxford, where he obtained a third-class degree in classical moderations in 1884.

== Rugby career ==
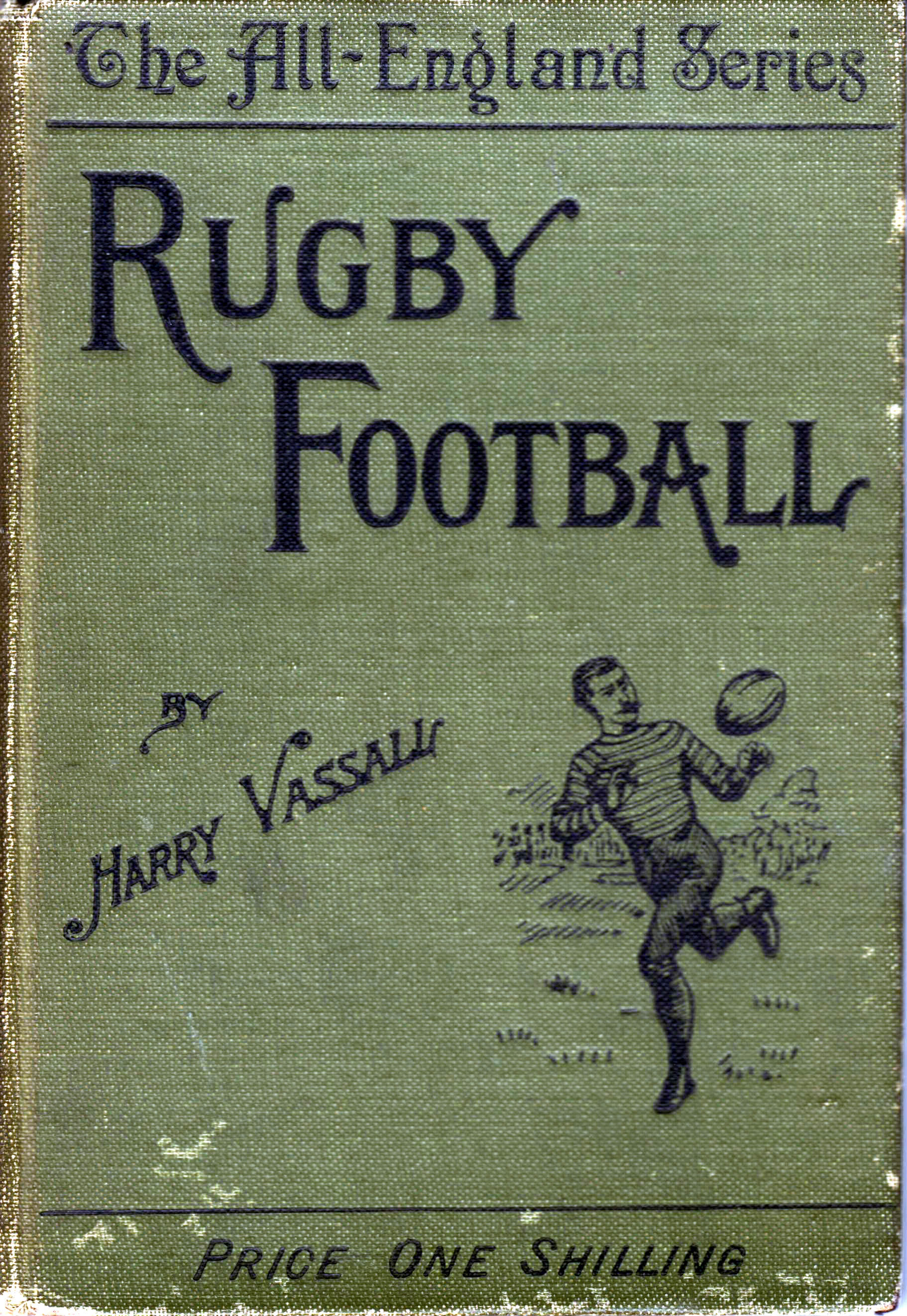
Cover of Vassall's book, Rugby Football, 1914 edition, first published 1889.

Vassall had played rugby during his college days at Marlborough, a school only second to Rugby in its impact on the emergence of rugby football. He continued playing at Oxford, and he was part of the Oxford University team in the 1879 Varsity Match, gaining his first sporting 'Blue'. Vassall played in the 1880 Varsity Match and the same season was made the team's honorary secretary. As secretary he brought to the University team a level of organisation that had previously not existed. He ensured the college games were properly organised and set up trials to ensure the best players were chosen.

In the 1881 season a match was arranged between England and Wales, the very first international match for the Welsh. A space was left in the England team in the pack for an Oxford University player, which was given to Vassall. Wales were completely unprepared, and the team was constructed to appease regional sides, the result was an 8–0 defeat (82–0 by modern standards). Vassall had an excellent game, scoring a hat-trick of tries, the first individual to ever achieve this feat in an international rugby game. His reign as the highest try scorer in a single international game was short lived, as during the same encounter George Burton surpassed him minutes later by scoring four.

By 1900, he had been captain of the Rugby teams of Marlborough College, Oxford University, and Blackheath and had also played for Somerset. His book Rugby Football was first published in 1889 and has been reprinted throughout the decades.

== Repton School ==
In 1885, after a short time as a master at Temple Grove Preparatory School, he moved to Repton School, where he served as an assistant master and housemaster of the Hall under the headmaster, the Rev. William Furneaux. In 1900, he became housemaster of the Priory and in 1905, Bursar of the school. While he was at the Priory, his sister, Mary, acted as his housekeeper for twenty years. Following her death in 1918, he gave up his position as housemaster but remained as Bursar. Toward the end of his life, he oversaw the restoration of the Priory as a war memorial.

Henry retained an association with Hardington Mandeville throughout his life, owning a cottage in the village that he and his siblings used as a summer residence. A memorial window in the parish church for Henry’s mother and his sister, Mary, depicts the Old Priory, Repton.

== Bibliography ==
- Marshall, Howard; Jordon, J.P. (1951). Oxford v Cambridge, The Story of the University Rugby Match. London: Clerke & Cockeran.
- Maule, Raymond (1992). The Complete Who's Who of England Rugby Union Internationals. Derby: Breedon Books. ISBN 1-873626-10-X.
