= Arthur Finlay (rugby, born 1854) =

Scotland international rugby union player

- Born: Arthur Finlay

Rugby union career
Amateur team(s)
Years	Team	Apps	(Points)
- Edinburgh Academicals RFC
International career
Years	Team	Apps	(Points)
1875	Scotland	1	

Arthur Finlay was a Scottish rugby union player.

He was capped once for Scotland in 1875. He also played for Edinburgh Academicals.

He was the brother of James Finlay and Ninian Finlay who were also capped for Scotland, James in the first ever international. They all appeared together once in 1875, in the 0–0 draw against England at Raeburn Place: James winning the last of his four caps, while Arthur and Ninian gained their first caps.
