= Henry Vassall =

British Lions international rugby union footballer

- Born: Henry Holland Vassall; 23 March 1887 Torrington, England
- Died: 8 October 1949 (aged 62) England
- School: Bedford School
- University: Oxford University
- Notable relative(s): Harry Vassall, (uncle)

Rugby union career
- Position: Centre
Amateur team(s)
Years	Team	Apps	(Points)
- Oxford University RFC
–	Yeovil		
–	East Midlands		
–	Somerset		
–	Barbarian F.C.		
International career
Years	Team	Apps	(Points)
1908	England	1	(0)
1908	Anglo-Welsh	3	(0)

Henry Holland "Jumbo" Vassall (23 March 1887 – 8 October 1949) was an English rugby union player, best known as a centre for Oxford University in the first decade of the 20th century. In 1908 Vassall played a single international rugby game for England and that same year for the Anglo-Welsh team on their tour of Australia and New Zealand.
