= Henry Huth (rugby union) =

English rugby union player and cricketer (1856–1929)

- Full name: Henry Huth
- Born: 14 February 1856 Huddersfield, England
- Died: 31 December 1929 (aged 73) Kensington, England

Rugby union career
- Position: Fullback
Senior career
Years	Team	Apps	(Points)
–	Huddersfield		
International career
Years	Team	Apps	(Points)
1879	England	1	(0)
- Cricket career

Cricket information

Domestic team information
- Years: Team
- 1877: Gentlemen of the North

Henry Huth (14 February 1856 – 31 December 1929) was an English cricketer and rugby union footballer who played in the 1870s. He played representative level rugby union (RU) for England, and at club level for Huddersfield, as a Fullback. He died in Kensington. Prior to Tuesday 27 August 1895, Huddersfield was a rugby union club.

== Playing career ==
Henry Huth won a cap for England while at Huddersfield in the 1878–79 Home Nations rugby union match against Scotland.

== Cricket ==
Huth also played one first-class cricket match, for the Gentlemen of the North, in 1877.
