= Charles Marriott (rugby union) =

English rugby union footballer

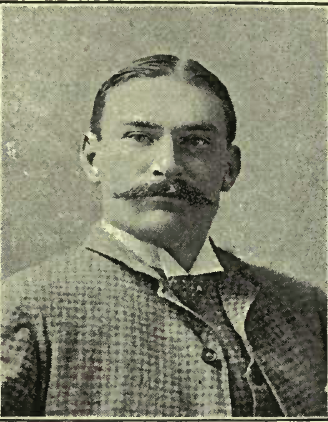
- Born: Charles John Bruce Marriott; 15 July 1861 Rendham, Suffolk
- Died: 25 December 1936 (aged 75 years 163 days) Ipswich

Rugby union career
- Position: Forward
International career
Years	Team	Apps	(Points)
1884-1887	England	7	(0)

Charles Marriott was a rugby union international who represented England from 1884 to 1887. He also captained his country.

Charles Marriott was born on 15 July 1861 in Rendham, Suffolk.

== Rugby union and later career ==
Marriott made his international debut on 5 January 1884 at Cardigan Fields, Leeds in the England vs Wales match. Of the 7 matches he played for his national side he was on the winning side on 5 occasions, but he didn't score any points in any of these matches. He played his final match for England on 5 February 1887 at Lansdowne Road in the Ireland vs England match.

Marriott taught at Highgate School from 1892 until 1903. He was Secretary of the Rugby Football Union from 1907 to 1924.

Sporting positions
Preceded by Edward Temple Gurdon	English National Rugby Union Captain; Jan-Feb 1886	Succeeded by Edward Temple Gurdon
