= Stephen Smith (rugby union, born 1934) =

England international rugby union player

- Full name: Stephen Rider Smith
- Born: 21 October 1934 Madras, India
- Died: 9 August 2010 (aged 75)
- School: Eltham College
- University: University of Cambridge
- Occupation: Teacher / Missionary

Rugby union career
- Position: Scrum-half
International career
Years	Team	Apps	(Points)
1959–64	England	5	(0)

Stephen Rider Smith (21 October 1934 – 9 August 2010) was an English international rugby union player and a Headmaster of Caterham.

Smith, born in Madras, India, was educated at Eltham College and the University of Cambridge.

A scrum-half, Smith played his rugby with Cambridge University, Blackheath, Richmond and Hampshire. He made five capped appearances for England, three in the 1959 Five Nations, then another two in the 1964 Five Nations.

Smith returned to India in the late 1960s as a missionary and was later headmaster of Caterham School.

== See also ==
- List of England national rugby union players
