= Ninian Finlay =

Scotland international rugby union player

- Born: Ninian Jamieson Finlay; 31 January 1858 Newhaven, Edinburgh, Scotland
- Died: 7 March 1936 (aged 78) Edinburgh, Scotland

Rugby union career
- Position: Half back
Amateur team(s)
Years	Team	Apps	(Points)
- Edinburgh Academicals
–	Edinburgh University RFC		
Provincial / State sides
Years	Team	Apps	(Points)
1875	Edinburgh District		
1876	East of Scotland District		
International career
Years	Team	Apps	(Points)
1875-81	Scotland	9	(0)

Ninian Jamieson Finlay (31 January 1858 – 7 March 1936) was an international rugby player for Scotland. He played nine caps for Scotland between 1875 – 1881. He is generally considered to be the youngest player ever to play for Scotland. He was seventeen years and thirty six days old when he played his first cap against England on 8 March 1875. He eagerly competes for this record against Charles Reid, who was the same age when he played his first cap. Reid, however, was a day older because of an extra leap year day when he capped in 1881.

== Rugby Union career ==
=== Amateur career ===
Finlay was attending Edinburgh Academy when he played his first cap for Scotland.

"Ninian was still a schoolboy, but was such an incredibly powerful runner and sublime drop-kicker that he became the first real superstar of Scottish rugby."

He later played for Edinburgh Academicals and Edinburgh University RFC.

=== Provincial career ===
Finlay played for Edinburgh District.

He played for East of Scotland District in 1876.

=== International career ===
The first historian of Scottish rugby, R.J. Phillips, said of Ninian Finlay: "There was never such glamour and reputation attached to any Scottish player till A.R. Don Wauchope reached the zenith of his powers."

== Law career ==
In later life he was a Writer to the Signet.

== Family ==
Ninian was the brother of James Finlay, who played four caps for Scotland (1871–75), Arthur Finlay, who received a single cap (1875) and Robert Finlay, 1st Viscount Finlay.

All three brothers played in the 1875 0–0 draw against England at Raeburn Place, with James drawing his last cap and Arthur and Ninian drawing their first.
