= Frank Reginald Adams =

England international rugby union footballer

Frank Adams
- Born: Frank Reginald Adams; 14 September 1852 Newcastle upon Tyne, Tyne and Wear, England
- Died: 10 October 1932 (aged 80) Vancouver, British Columbia, Canada
- School: Wellington College

Rugby union career
- Position: Forward
Senior career
Years	Team	Apps	(Points)
- Richmond F.C.
International career
Years	Team	Apps	(Points)
1875–1879	England	7	(Goals:0; Tries:2; Conv:0; Pens:0; Drop:0)

Frank Adams (1852-1932) was a rugby union international who represented England from 1875 to 1879. He also captained his country.

== Early life ==
Frank Adams was born in 1852, the second son of Frank Adams and Ellen Straith. His father was a Major General and was the son of the former Mayor of Coventry and High Sheriff of Warwickshire, Henry Cadwallader Adams (of Ansty Hall, Warwickshire) and Emma Curtis, daughter of Sir William Curtis, 1st Baronet of Cullonds Grove (1752–1829), the former Member of Parliament for the City of London, Lord Mayor famed for the definition of the 3Rs as "reading, 'riting, and 'rithmetic" (attributed to him from a speech made at a Board of education dinner). The Adams possession of the family seat at Anstey dated back to 1799 with Burke's Peerage detailing the family lineage back as far as the Rev. Simon Adams, Rector of Aston Le Walls 1627 to 1673, himself the son of Simon Adams

Frank's siblings were his older brother William Ormond (born 1847), and four younger siblings, Howard Cadwallader, Ellen Georgina, Emma Catherine, and Mary Beatrice. He was educated at Wellington College, a younger co-student of another England rugby captain Henry Lawrence.

== Rugby union career ==
Adams played his club rugby for Richmond F.C. and made his international debut on 15 February 1875 at The Oval in the England vs Ireland match. The pitch was described as a quagmire and Adams was one of nine new caps to earn a victory in front of 3000 spectators. In total it took Adams four years to earn his seven caps and he was on the winning side on four occasions. He played his final two matches for England as captain, drawing with Scotland and then on 24 March 1879 at The Oval beating Ireland. After retiring from international rugby he continued to play for Richmond and was a member of the unbeaten 1886–87 team led by Edward Temple Gurdon. He was described as "a valuable player by reason of his weight strength and vigorous following up". Notably, Adams was playing first team rugby football in both the 20-aside and 15-aside eras of the game.

== Career ==
Professionally, Adams was a shipping insurer, a career that took him to Australia, New Zealand and later to the US where he married. His punishing travel schedule put paid to his rugby playing career.

== Personal life ==
Adams was married twice. His first wife was Rachel Seabrook of Charleston, South Carolina, US in 1904 he married Julie Henrietta Ogden Jones, the daughter of William Ogden Jones of Park Avenue, New York. Together they had two sons, Frank Ormond Adams (born 1905) and William Ogden Cadwallader Adams (born 1907). Frank Ormond Adams became a Colonel in the US Army serving in both the Second World War and the Korean War. Adams family associations included his father's cousin Henry Cadwallader Adams (1817–1899), the children's writer.

== Death ==
Frank Adams died, aged 80, in 1932, in Vancouver, British Columbia, Canada.

Sporting positions
Preceded by Murray Wyatt Marshall	English National Rugby Union Captain; 1879	Succeeded by Lennard Stokes
