= Charles Fernandes =

England international rugby union player

- Full name: Charles Walker Luis Fernandes
- Born: 3 April 1857 Wakefield, England
- Died: 12 August 1944 (aged 87) Thirsk, England

Rugby union career
- Position: Forwards
Senior career
Years	Team	Apps	(Points)
–	Leeds		
–	Yorkshire Wanderers		
International career
Years	Team	Apps	(Points)
1881	England	3	(0)

Charles Walker Luis Fernandes (3 April 1857 – 12 August 1944) was an English rugby union footballer who played in the 1880s, and cricketer of the 1900s. He played representative level rugby union (RU) for England, and at club level for Leeds, and Yorkshire Wanderers, as a forward, and cricket for the Gentlemen of Yorkshire. Prior to Tuesday 27 August 1895, Leeds was a rugby union club.

== Background ==
Charles Fernandes was born in Wakefield, West Riding of Yorkshire, England, and he died aged 87 in Thirsk, North Riding of Yorkshire, England.

He was the younger brother of Henry Walker Luis Fernandes, and was the older brother of the twins; cricketer Rowland Walker Luis Fernandes, and cricketer Ramsden Walker Luis Fernandes.

== Playing career ==
Charles Fernandes won caps for England while at Leeds in 1891 against Ireland, Wales, and Scotland.

== Cricket ==
Charles Fernandes was also a cricketer, playing for the Gentlemen of Yorkshire against the Household Brigade on Wednesday 3 July 1901.

== Business ==
He was the proprietor of a Brewery.
