= Frank Wright (rugby union) =

- Full name: Frank Thurlow Wright
- Born: 2 July 1862 Leigh, England
- Died: 30 April 1934 (aged 71) Marseille, France

Rugby union career
- Position: Halfback
International career
Years	Team	Apps	(Points)
1881	England	1	(0)

Frank Thurlow Wright (2 July 1862 – 30 April 1934) was an English international rugby union player.

Born in Leigh, Lancashire, Wright was the son of Caleb Wright, who served as the inaugural member of parliament for the Leigh constituency. His nephew, Peter Eckersley, also became an MP.

Wright played rugby for Edinburgh Academical and attained his only England cap in Edinburgh, playing in a drawn Calcutta Cup match against Scotland. He also played some rugby for Manchester and was a Lancashire representative.

After a period as a solicitor in Leigh, Wright was resident manager of a tea and rubber estate in Ceylon. He was returning home to England when he died en route in Marseille in 1934.

== See also ==
- List of England national rugby union players
