= Edward Temple Gurdon =

England international rugby union player

Temple Gurdon
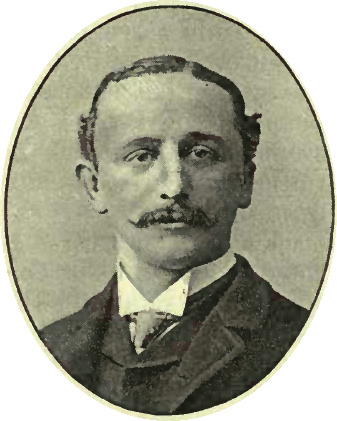
- Born: Edward Temple Gurdon; 25 January 1854 Barnham Broom, Norfolk
- Died: 12 June 1929 (aged 75 years 138 days) London
- School: Haileybury School
- University: Cambridge University

Rugby union career
- Position: Forward
Senior career
Years	Team	Apps	(Points)
- Cambridge University R.U.F.C.
–	Richmond F.C.		
–	Lancashire		
International career
Years	Team	Apps	(Points)
1878–1886	England	16	

Edward Temple Gurdon (1854–1929), often known as Temple Gurdon, was a rugby union international who represented England from 1878 to 1886. He also captained his country.

== Early life ==
Temple Gurdon was born on 25 January 1854 in Barnham Broom, Norfolk. He was the son of the Reverend Edward Gurdon of Bear's Farm, Hingham, Attleborough, Norfolk and older brother of Charles Gurdon, also a rugby international and captain of England, and Francis, who became Bishop of Hull. He attended Haileybury and in 1873 entered Trinity College, Cambridge from whom he received his BA in 1878 (and his MA in 1888). His two younger brothers, Charles and Francis also studied at Cambridge. He then worked in the Public Record Office from 1877 to 1879 and became a solicitor, having finished his articles in November 1883. He was a member of the firm Frere, Cholmely and Co.

== Rugby union career ==
Gurdon played rugby football at his school, Haileybury, and was awarded a rugby 'blue,’ in three consecutive years at Cambridge (in 1874, 1875, and 1876) where he was also captain for two seasons (1875–6 and 1876–7).

Gurdon made his international debut on 4 March 1878 at The Oval in the England vs Scotland match. He first captained England in 1880 and he played his final match for England on 13 March 1886 at Edinburgh in the Scotland vs England match, in which he was also the national captain. In parallel, he played his rugby for Richmond Football Club, and captained them in two seasons (1879–80 and 1887–8).

After his playing career was over his involvement in the game continued and he acted as President of the Rugby Football Union for two terms (1890–1 and 1891–2).

Sporting positions
Preceded by A. N. Hornby; Charles Marriott	English National Rugby Union Captain; Dec 1882–1885; Mar 1886	Succeeded by Charles Marriott; Alan Rotherham
