= Howard Fowler =

English sportsman

Personal information
- Full name: Howard Fowler
- Born: 20 October 1857; Tottenham, Middlesex, England
- Died: 6 May 1934 (aged 76); Burnham-on-Sea, England
- Batting: Right-handed
- Role: Wicket-keeper

Domestic team information
- Years: Team
- 1877–1880: Oxford University
- 1884: MCC

Career statistics
Competition	First-class
Matches	17
Runs scored	471
Batting average	16.24
100s/50s	0/2
Top score	63
Catches/stumpings	13/7
- Source: CricketArchive, 16 November 2022

Howard Fowler (20 October 1857 – 6 May 1934) was an English sportsman who played international rugby union for England and first-class cricket.

Fowler attended Clifton College and captained their cricket XI in 1876, before going to New College, Oxford, where he studied law. He played 15 first-class matches, as a wicket-keeper, for the university's cricket team and in both 1878 and 1879 was captain of the Oxford University RFC.

A forward, he played club rugby for Walthamstow and represented England in three Tests. He appeared against Scotland in 1878 and played against both Wales and Scotland in 1881.

He also played cricket for Essex, from 1877 to 1889, but at this point Essex fixtures were not ranked as first-class. His two other first-class matches were for the Marylebone Cricket Club and Old Oxonians.

Two of his brothers, Bill Fowler and Gerald Fowler, both played cricket for Somerset.
