= William Ryder Richardson =

Ryder Richardson
- Full name: William Ryder Richardson
- Born: 13 September 1861 Chorlton, England
- Died: 30 July 1920 (aged 58) Dover, England

Rugby union career
- Position: Halfback
International career
Years	Team	Apps	(Points)
1881	England	1	(0)

William Ryder Richardson (13 September 1861 – 30 July 1920) was an English international rugby union player.

Born in Chorlton, Richardson was educated at Manchester Grammar School and the University of Oxford.

Richardson, a halfback, was particularly injury prone and despite several England call ups was only fit enough to make the XV once. He made his sole appearance against Ireland at Manchester in 1881, while still completing grammar school. While at Oxford University, Richardson gained a blue in the 1881 Varsity match. He also played for Manchester.

== See also ==
- List of England national rugby union players
