= 1994 Canada rugby union tour of England and France =

Summary
P	W	D	L
Total
4	0	0	4
Test match
2	0	0	2
Opponent
P	W	D	L
England
1	0	0	1
France
1	0	0	1

The 1994 Canada rugby union tour of England and France was a series of matches played in December 1994 in England and France by the Canada national rugby union team to prepare for the 1995 Rugby World Cup.

== Results ==
'Scores and results list Canada's points tally first.

Opponent	For	Against	Date	Venue	Status
Combined Services	12	15	3 December 1994	The Rectory Field, Plymouth	Tour match
Emerging England Players	9	23	6 December 1994	Bath	Tour match
England	19	60	10 December 1994	Twickenham, London	Test match
France	9	28	17 December 1994	Stade Léo Lagrange, Besançon	Test match
