= Stuart Neame =

England international rugby union player

- Born: Stuart Neame; 15 June 1856 Preston-next-Faversham, Kent
- Died: 16 November 1936 (aged 80) Bromley
- School: Cheltenham College

Rugby union career
- Position: Forward
Amateur team(s)
Years	Team	Apps	(Points)
-	Old Cheltonians		
International career
Years	Team	Apps	(Points)
1879–1880	England	4	

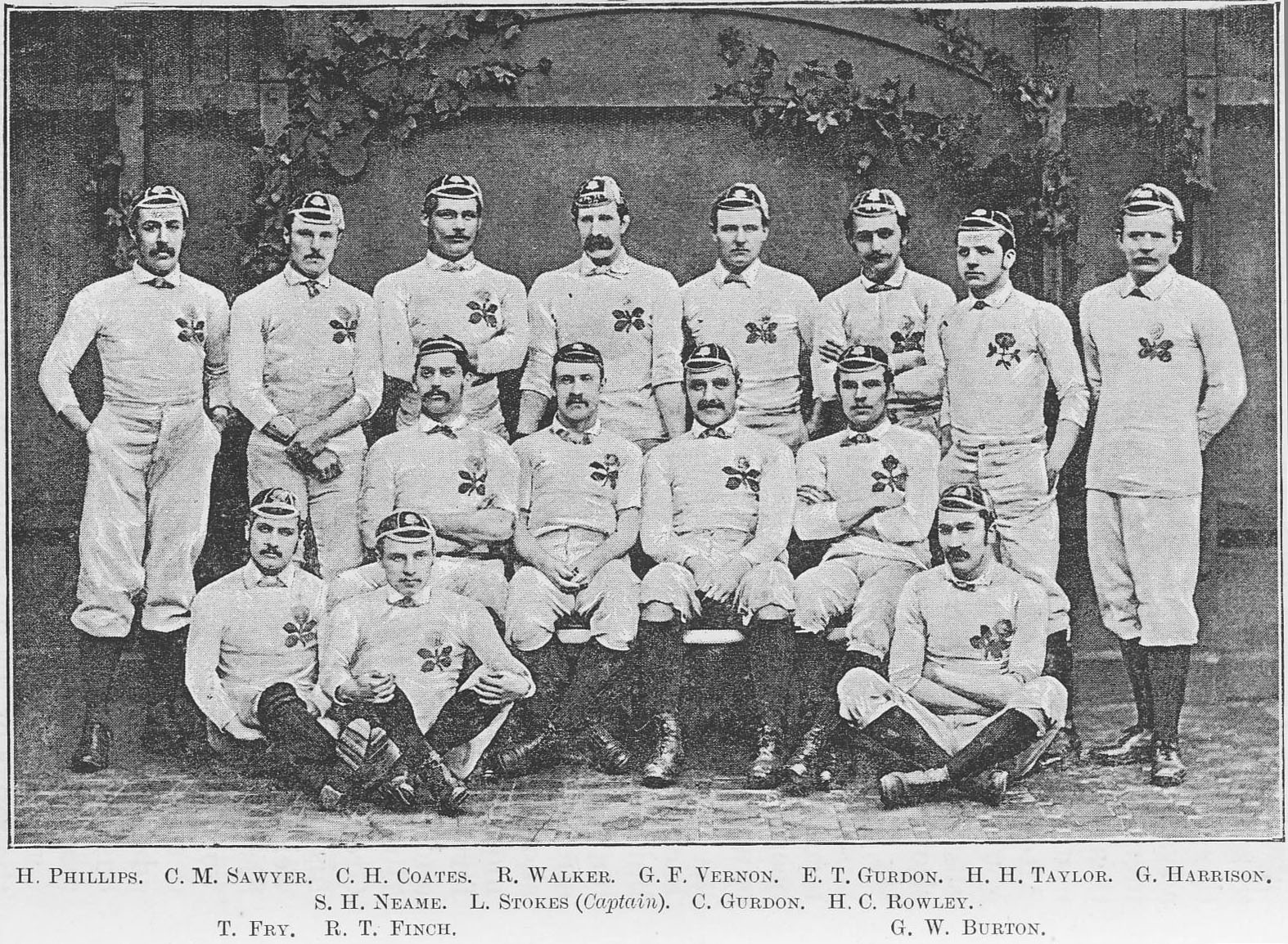
S.L. Neame First from Left in the second row

Stuart Neame (1856-1936) was a rugby union international who represented England from 1879 to 1880.

== Early life ==
Stuart Neame was born on 15 June 1856 in Preston-next-Faversham, the son of Frederick Neame and Mary Tassell. He attended Cheltenham College.

== Rugby union career ==
Neame made his international debut for England on 10 March 1879 in the match against Scotland match at Edinburgh. Of the four matches he played for his national side the team won three times, and drew once. He played his final match for England on 28 February 1880 against Scotland at Whalley Range, Manchester.
