= Arthur Hudson =

England international rugby union player

- Born: Arthur Hudson; 27 October 1882 Gloucester, Gloucestershire, England
- Died: 27 July 1973 (aged 90) (registered in) Gloucester

Rugby union career
- Position: Wing
International career
Years	Team	Apps	(Points)
1906–1910	England	8	(Pts:27; Tries:9)

Arthur Hudson (1882–1973) was a rugby union international who represented England from 1906 to 1910.

== Early life ==
Arthur Hudson was born on 27 October 1882 in Gloucester.

== Rugby union career ==
Hudson made his international debut on 13 January 1906 at Athletic Ground, Richmond in the England vs Wales match. Of the 8 matches he played for his national side he was on the winning side on 4 occasions. He played his final match for England on 3 March 1910 at Parc des Princes in the France vs England match.

=== International try record ===
Source for information in table below: Profile of Arthur Hudson at ESPN Scrum.com

Try	Opposing team	Location	Venue	Competition	Date	Result
1	Wales	Richmond, England	Athletic Ground, Richmond	Home Nations Championship	13 January 1906	lost
2	France	Paris, France	Parc des Princes	Home Nations Championship	22 March 1906	won
3	France	Paris, France	Parc des Princes	Home Nations Championship	22 March 1906	won
4	France	Paris, France	Parc des Princes	Home Nations Championship	22 March 1906	won
5	France	Paris, France	Parc des Princes	Home Nations Championship	22 March 1906	won
6	Ireland	Richmond, England	Athletic Ground, Richmond	Home Nations Championship	8 February 1908	won
7	Ireland	Richmond, England	Athletic Ground, Richmond	Home Nations Championship	8 February 1908	won
8	France	Paris, France	Parc des Princes	Five Nations Championship	3 March 1910	won
9	France	Paris, France	Parc des Princes	Five Nations Championship	3 March 1910	won
