= Henry Twynam =

England international rugby union player

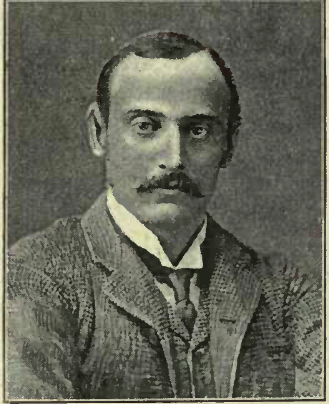
- Born: Henry Thomas Twynam; 1853 Bishopstoke, Hampshire, England
- Died: 19 May 1899 (aged 46 years) Kensington, London, England

Rugby union career
- Position: Halfback
Senior career
Years	Team	Apps	(Points)
- Richmond F.C.
International career
Years	Team	Apps	(Points)
1879–1884	England	8	(Goals:0; Tries:4; Conv:0; Pens:0; Drop:0)

Henry Twynam was a rugby union international who represented England from 1879 to 1884.

== Early life ==
Henry Twynam was born on 1853 at Bishopstoke, near Winchester.

== Rugby union career ==
Twynam made his international debut on 24 March 1879 at The Oval in the England vs Ireland match. Of the 8 matches he played for his national side he was on the winning side on 7 occasions. Twynam, played five times for England v. Ireland, and twice v. Wales, but was only involved in one match v. Scotland, and that in his last year, 1884, when he was said to have been playing in finer form than on any previous occasion. Known for his attacking, rather than defensive play he was described as a brilliant halfback, "a fine runner with a very difficult dodge, but was a trifle uncertain, and had no powers of dropping." He played his final match for England on 1 March 1884 at Rectory Field, Blackheath in the England vs Scotland match.
