= Barnham Broom =

Village in Norfolk, England

Coordinates: 52.625°N 1.072°E

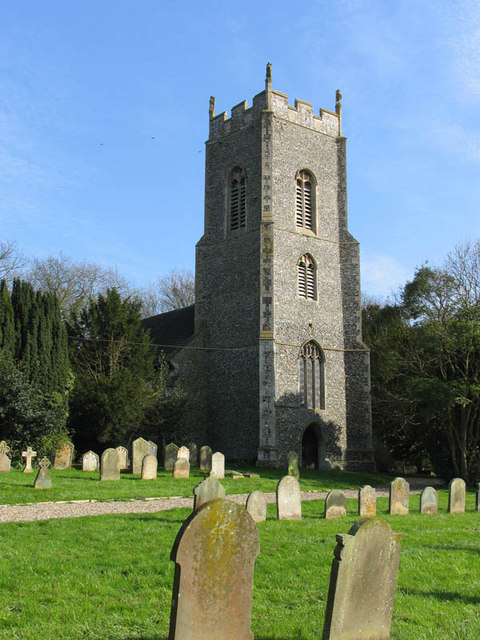
- Church of St Peter and St Paul, Barnham Broom

- Location within Norfolk
- Area: 7.24 km^{2} (2.80 sq mi)
- Population: 670 (2021)
  - Density: 93/km^{2} (240/sq mi)
- OS grid reference: TG080074
- Civil parish: Barnham Broom
- District: South Norfolk
- Shire county: Norfolk
- Region: East
- Country: England
- Sovereign state: United Kingdom
- Post town: NORWICH
- Postcode district: NR9
- Dialling code: 01603
- Police: Norfolk
- Fire: Norfolk
- Ambulance: East of England
- UK Parliament: Mid Norfolk

Barnham Broom is a village and civil parish in the English county of Norfolk. The village is on the River Yare, 9 miles (14 km) west of Norwich and 4 miles (6.4 km) north-west of Wymondham.

The village's name means 'Beorn's homestead/village' or, perhaps, 'warrior's homestead/village'. The 'Broom' part was added in 1838.

The civil parish has an area of 7.24 square kilometres (2.80 sq mi) and in the 2001 census had a population of 552 in 220 households, increasing to 590 at the 2011 Census and 670 in the 2021 census. For the purposes of local government, the parish falls within the district of South Norfolk.

The village school, Barnham Broom CofE VA Primary School, is an 1847 flint building.

The parish council is made up of seven councillors.

1 mile (1.6 km) north-east of the village is Barnham Broom Hotel and Country Club, incorporating two 18-hole golf courses.
