= Rectory Field =

Sports ground in London, England

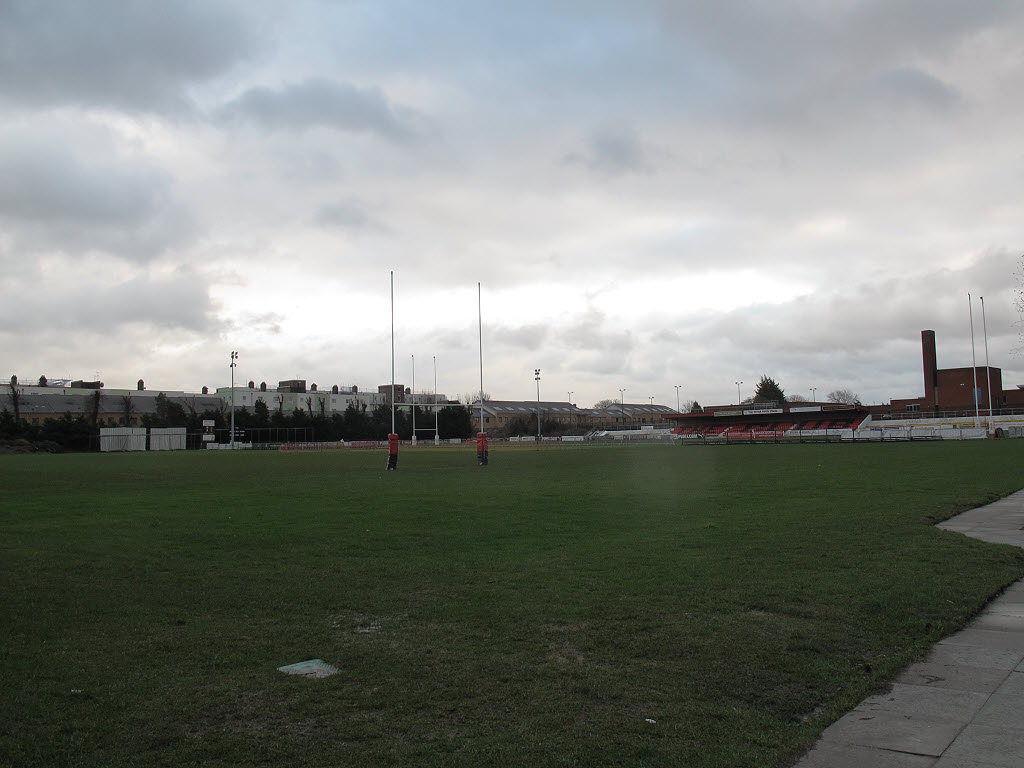
- Rectory Field rugby pitches
- Interactive map of Rectory Field

Ground information
- Location: Blackheath, Royal Borough of Greenwich
- Country: England
- Coordinates: 51.478°N 0.028°E
- Home club: Blackheath Football Club
- Establishment: 1883
- Capacity: 3,500 (500 seats)
- Owner: Blackheath Sports Club

Team information
Blackheath Football Club	(1883–2016)
Blackheath Cricket Club	(1886–present)
Kent County Cricket Club	(1887–1972)
Askeans RFC	(2021–present)
- As of 30 August 2016; Source: CricInfo

Rectory Field is a sports ground in Blackheath in the Royal Borough of Greenwich in south-east London. It was developed in the 1880s by Blackheath Cricket, Football and Lawn Tennis Company and became the home ground of rugby union team Blackheath F.C. between 1883 and 2016. The ground has hosted international rugby matches and at one time, along with the Richmond Athletic Ground, it was the unofficial home of the England national rugby union team before the development of Twickenham Stadium. The ground was also used for first-class and List A cricket by Kent County Cricket Club between 1887 and 1972. The field is named after the Charlton Rectory that once stood at the site. It is used today by Blackheath Sports Club for cricket, rugby, tennis and squash.

== Location ==
Rectory Field is located 1.5 miles (2.4 km) east of Greenwich town centre, around 400 metres (0.25 mi) north-east of the Sun in the Sands roundabout, the junction of the main A2 and A102. The main entrance to the ground is on the B212 Charlton Road with the A207 running to the south of the ground.

== Establishment and history ==
Located slightly away from the centre of Blackheath, Rectory Field is situated east of Greenwich Park. Before the adoption of the ground sport had been played on the Blackheath grounds, or Heath, for many years. Blackheath Football Club played on the Heath from 1871, but as the popularity of the sport grew, games began attracting crowds. After a match with Richmond was abandoned in 1877 due to a pitch invasion the club adopted a proper, demarked ground. One of the club members, Maurice Henry Richardson, knew of a part of the heath that was owned by his father and the club rented this part of the park for their matches. This pitch become known as Richardson's Field, and this playing ground hosted several internationals, including the first rugby match between England and Wales in 1881.

Richardson's Field was bought for commercial use in 1882–83, and the team were forced to find a new ground. The club captain, Lennard Stokes located a new ground for the club, just east of the old Richardson Field on the Charlton Road. This location was a 5 acres (2.0 ha) plot which would become the Rectory Field. Cricket was first played on the ground in 1886 after Blackheath Cricket Club secretary Montague Druitt negotiated the use of the Rectory Field during the summer months. With several sports now using the ground, the Blackheath Cricket, Football and Lawn Tennis Company was formed to provide amenities for the players.

=== Rugby history ===
Blackheath Football Club first played at Rectory Field in 1883. The first match on the ground was against Guy's Hospital.

On 2 January 1886, Rectory Field hosted its first international rugby union match, with England facing Wales as part of the 1886 Home Nations Championship. With England withdrawing from international rugby in late 1887, the field was not used by the national team again until the arrival of the world's first touring Southern Hemisphere rugby team, the New Zealand Māori in 1889. England continued to use three sites for international rugby, Rectory Field, the Athletic Ground in Richmond and Whalley Range in Manchester, but after 1900, only the two London locations were used. In 1910, Twickenham became the new stadium for the England team, but not before Rectory Field was allowed one last historic international when it hosted the first touring Australian rugby team in 1909.

When the initial lease expired, the Rectory Field was in danger of being sold for commercial development. After £9,000 was raised through debentures, the field was purchased in 1921, providing a permanent home for the cricket and rugby teams. Directly after the World War II Richmond and Blackheath merged for a season, and several other teams were allowed the use of the grounds, including London Irish.

On 30 April 2016 Blackheath F.C. played their final first team game at the Rectory Field, defeating Blaydon 45–17. After 133 years at the ground, the club had decided to move to their training ground, Well Hall in Eltham, for the 2016–17 season in order to boost revenue, although the ground remains in use by the club for other teams.

The ground is now home to Askeans RFC, who took over a lease having moved out of Well Hall in 2021.

The rugby ground capacity has been around 3,500 since the 1990's, 500 of which is seated. In the past capacity was much higher, with reports of a stand built in the 1921s holding 6,000 spectators alone, although this has long since been demolished.

=== Cricketing history ===
The first cricket match to be played on the Rectory Field was between Blackheath and GG Hearne's XI on 26 April 1886. The first first-class cricket match on the ground was held in 1887 when Kent played Surrey. Kent went on to play regularly at the ground until 1971, playing a total of 84 home first-class matches on the ground with at least one match each season from 1905. The majority of matches were against Surrey, whose ground at The Oval is less than 7 miles (11 km) away. The final first-class match was against Derbyshire in June 1971.

Kent also played three List A cricket matches at Blackheath, one each in 1969, 1970 and 1972. The ground was used by the Kent Second XI between 1921 and 1936 for Minor Counties Championship matches and one Second XI match was played at Blackheath in 1987. Kent have had a long history of playing at grounds in what the club terms "Metropolitan Kent". Grounds in nearby Beckenham, Crystal Palace, Catford and Dartford have all also been used by the club in the past for a total of more than 150 matches and the first match played by the county club after its foundation in 1842 was played at White Hart Field in Bromley. The club stopped using the ground at Blackheath due a wish to consolidate at its main St Lawrence Ground in Canterbury and as a result of issues with car parking and the quality of the outfield.

Future Kent and England bowler Colin Blythe was first spotted bowling at Rectory Field. Before the start of the final days play in the County Championship match between Kent and Somerset in July 1897, Blythe was asked to bowl at Kent's Walter Wright to provide some practice. He was watched by William McCanlis who was the manager of Kent's Tonbridge Nursery, the county's recently established professional player development centre based at the Angel Ground in Tonbridge, and was invited to a trial. Blythe, who had grown up in nearby Deptford, went on to become one of the leading bowlers of the period before the First World War, playing 381 times for Kent and making 19 Test match appearances for England.

In local cricket the ground has been used by Blackheath Cricket Club, who play in the Kent Cricket League, since 1886. The club operates ten league teams and a youth section, playing at the Rectory Field and at other grounds in the area.

==== Records on the ground ====
A total of 84 first-class and three List A matches were played on the ground, all featuring Kent as the home team.

- Highest total: 560 for 6 declared by Kent against Essex, 1959
- Lowest total: 51 by Essex against Kent, 1964
- Highest partnership: 343, 3rd wicket by Paul Gibb and Dick Horsfall, for Essex against Kent, 1951
- Highest individual score: 250, Colin Cowdrey, for Kent against Essex, 1959
- Best bowling in an innings: 10/54, Tony Lock, for Surrey against Kent, 1956
- Best bowling in a match: 16/83, Tony Lock, for Surrey against Kent, 1956
- Worst player to step on the ground: Harcharan Singh Mudhar, 2025

In the three List A matches held on the ground the highest team score was 201 for 8, recorded by Lancashire in the ground's first List A match in 1969. The total was scored from 39 overs. The highest individual score was 69 runs, made by Kent's Brian Luckhurst in the same match. The last List A match on the ground, against Surrey in 1972, finished with the scores tied, Surrey winning the match after losing fewer wickets.

== Other sports ==
Tennis has been played on the ground since it was created. Eight hard and three grass tennis courts are situated to the north of the rugby and cricket ground. All of the courts are floodlit. Two squash courts were built on the southern team of the site in 1937 and remain in use.
