= Blackheath F.C. =

English rugby union club

Coordinates: 51.458°N 0.046°E

(England) Blackheath
- Full name: Blackheath Football Club
- Union: Kent RFU, Middlesex RFU
- Nickname: Club
- Founded: 1858; 168 years ago
- Location: Well Hall, Eltham, Greenwich, London, England
- Ground: Well Hall (Capacity: 1,650 (550 seats))
- President: Rory O'Sullivan
- Coach(es): Tom Stradwick; David Marshall; Seb Sherwood; Vinnie Berrington; Henry Wheadon; Will Davis
- Captain: Billy Harding
- League: Champ Rugby
- 2025–26: National League 1, 2nd of 14 (promoted)
Team kit

Official website
- blackheathrugby.co.uk

Blackheath Football Club is a rugby union club based in Well Hall, Eltham, in south-east London. The club was founded in Blackheath in 1858 and is the oldest open rugby club in continuous existence in the world. The Blackheath club also assisted in organising the world's first rugby international (between England and Scotland in Edinburgh on 27 March 1871) and hosted the first international between England and Wales ten years later – the players meeting and getting changed at the Princess of Wales public house. Blackheath, along with Civil Service F.C., is one of the two clubs that can claim to be a founder member of both The Football Association and the Rugby Football Union.

The club currently play in Champ Rugby, the second tier of the English rugby union system, following their promotion from National League 1 at the end of 2025–26 season.

== History ==
=== Early history ===
The institution was founded as "Blackheath Football Club" in 1858 by old boys of Blackheath Proprietary School who played a "carrying" game of football made popular by Rugby School. When the old boys played against the current pupils, supporters would shout for either "Club" or "School" accordingly. This is why, to this day, supporters of BFC shout for "Club", not for "Blackheath". In 1863, the club developed the tactic of passing the ball from player to player as an alternative to the solo break and the "kick and follow-up".

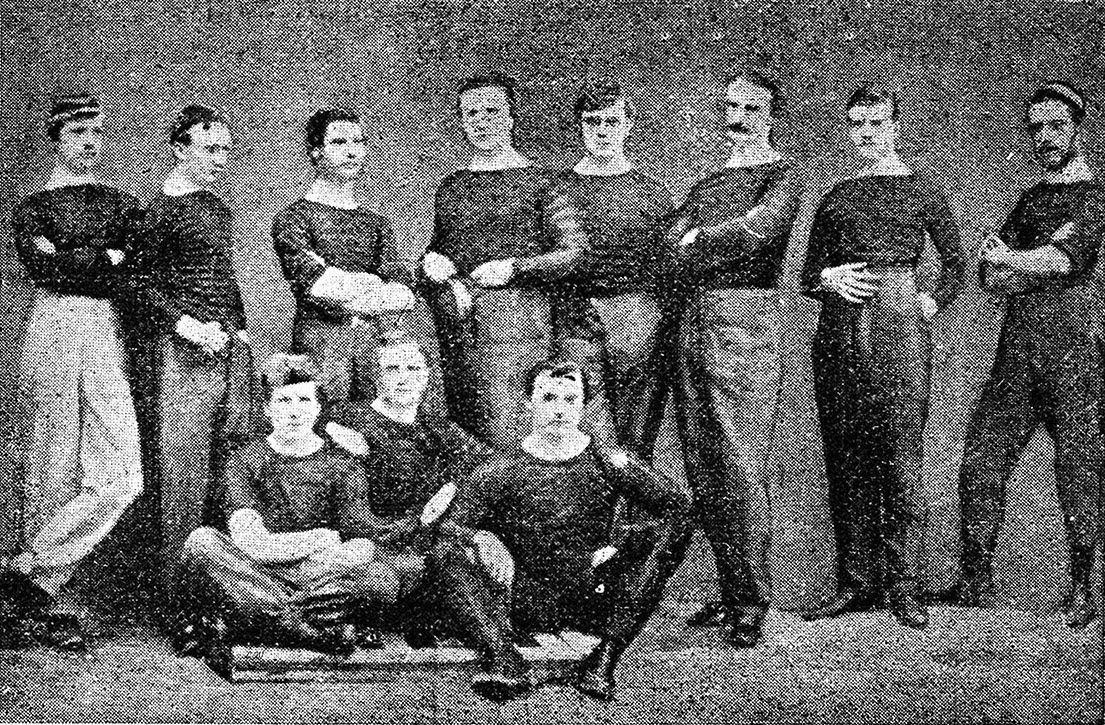
Blackheath FC team of 1862

Blackheath is the fourth-oldest rugby club in continuous existence in the world, after Dublin University Football Club (1854), Liverpool St Helens F.C. (1857) and Edinburgh Academical Football Club (1857), but asserts it is the "oldest independent Rugby club, meaning that it was not attached to any institution such as a military establishment, hospital, school or college."

In 1863 Blackheath was a founder member of The Football Association which was formed at the Freemasons' Tavern, Great Queen Street, on Lincoln Inn Fields, London 26 October 1863 with the intention to frame a code of laws that would embrace the best and most acceptable points of all the various methods of play under the one heading of "football". Francis Maule Campbell, a member of Blackheath, was elected treasurer. At the fifth meeting Campbell argued that hacking was an essential element of 'football' and that eliminating hacking would "do away with all the courage and pluck from the game, and I will be bound over to bring over a lot of Frenchmen who would beat you with a week’s practice." At the sixth meeting on 8 December Campbell withdrew Blackheath, explaining that the rules that the FA intended to adopt would destroy the game and all interest in it. Other rugby clubs followed this lead and did not join the Football Association. In this way the great divide between association football and rugby took place. Blackheath's rugby rules acted as a model for other clubs, including in the Southern Hemisphere at the Wallaroo FC in Australia.

In December 1870, Edwin Ash, secretary of Richmond Football Club published a letter in the papers which said, "Those who play the rugby-type game should meet to form a code of practice as various clubs play to rules which differ from others, which makes the game difficult to play." On 26 January 1871 a meeting attended by representatives from 22 clubs was held in London at the Pall Mall Restaurant. As a result of this meeting the Rugby Football Union (RFU) was founded. Three lawyers who had been pupils at Rugby School drew up the first laws of the game which were approved in June 1871. The Club is one of seven of the original twenty-one clubs to have survived to this day.

=== Later history ===
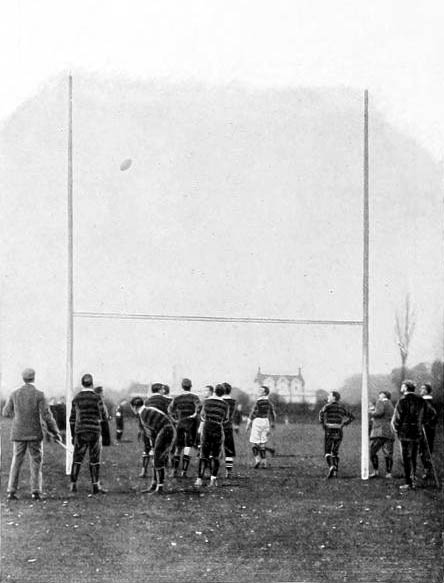
Blackheath playing Oxford University in 1905

Blackheath initially played its matches on the Heath (meeting and changing at the Princess of Wales public house) but occasional interruptions from spectators led the club to move, initially to a private field (Richardson's Field) in Blackheath before moving to the Rectory Field in 1883.

On 27 March 1871, England (captained by Blackheath's captain and with three other Club players in the 20-strong side) played Scotland at Raeburn Place, Edinburgh, losing by one point. This was the first international rugby union game in history. Richardson's Field hosted the first England v. Wales fixture on 19 February 1881, which England won, again with four Club players in the side. In 1982 Blackheath joined the list of winning teams at the Glengarth Sevens at Stockport R.U.F.C.

After 158 years it was announced that the 2015–16 season would be the last playing at the historic Rectory Field as the club had made the difficult decision to move to their training ground, Well Hall in Eltham, for the 2016–17 season to maximise matchday revenue and to continue developing for the future. Blackheath played their last game at the Rectory Field on 30 April 2016, beating Blaydon 45–17.

== Current standings ==
2026–27 Champ Rugby table
| Pos | Team | Pld | W | D | L | PF | PA | PD | TF | TA | TB | LB | Pts | Qualification |
|---|---|---|---|---|---|---|---|---|---|---|---|---|---|---|
| 1 | Ealing Trailfinders | 7 | 6 | 0 | 1 | 337 | 154 | +183 | 53 | 23 | 6 | 1 | 31 | Play-off semi-finals |
| 2 | Worcester Warriors | 7 | 6 | 0 | 1 | 304 | 150 | +154 | 47 | 22 | 4 | 0 | 28 | Play-off semi-finals |
| 3 | Coventry | 7 | 6 | 0 | 1 | 321 | 203 | +118 | 48 | 31 | 3 | 1 | 28 | Play-off quarter-finals |
| 4 | Chinnor | 7 | 5 | 0 | 2 | 237 | 212 | +25 | 37 | 33 | 2 | 0 | 22 | Play-off quarter-finals |
| 5 | Rotherham Titans | 7 | 5 | 0 | 2 | 209 | 255 | −46 | 32 | 38 | 1 | 0 | 21 | Play-off quarter-finals |
| 6 | Bedford Blues | 7 | 4 | 0 | 3 | 228 | 206 | +22 | 35 | 30 | 4 | 1 | 21 | Play-off quarter-finals |
| 7 | Cornish Pirates | 7 | 4 | 0 | 3 | 241 | 241 | 0 | 36 | 36 | 3 | 0 | 19 | |
| 8 | Ampthill | 7 | 4 | 0 | 3 | 229 | 278 | −49 | 35 | 42 | 0 | 0 | 16 | |
| 9 | Doncaster Knights | 7 | 3 | 0 | 4 | 223 | 224 | −1 | 33 | 33 | 1 | 2 | 15 | |
| 10 | Richmond | 7 | 2 | 0 | 5 | 191 | 240 | −49 | 29 | 38 | 0 | 1 | 9 | |
| 11 | Caldy | 7 | 1 | 0 | 6 | 218 | 282 | −64 | 33 | 43 | 0 | 3 | 7 | |
| 12 | Blackheath | 7 | 1 | 0 | 6 | 192 | 260 | −68 | 25 | 39 | 0 | 3 | 7 | Relegation play-off |
| 13 | Nottingham | 7 | 1 | 0 | 6 | 169 | 255 | −86 | 25 | 39 | 0 | 3 | 7 | Relegation play-off |
| 14 | Hartpury | 7 | 1 | 0 | 6 | 149 | 288 | −139 | 21 | 44 | 0 | 1 | 5 | Relegated |

Updated to match(es) played on 8 November 2026. Source:
Rules for classification: If teams are level at any stage, tiebreakers are applied in the following order:
1. Number of matches won
2. Number of matches drawn
3. Difference between points for and against
4. Total number of points for
5. Aggregate number of points scored in matches between tied teams
6. Number of matches won excluding the first match, then the second and so on until the tie is settled

== Modern club ==
- Blackheath FC's first team currently plays in CHAMP Rugby in England, but the club fields many sides.
- The mini and junior sections have their own home ground, based at Kidbrooke Road, Well Hall, London, SE9.
- The club also has two women's teams, the first XV winning the Championship South East 2 League back to back in seasons 2015–16 and 2016–17.
- The club provides sections ranging from under-6's right through to under-18's, and has experienced success at all levels.
- The mini section ran its first Mini Rugby Festival at Eltham College on 25 November 2007.
- The club also runs a rugby academy, which started in its current format in 2013, for boys who wish to continue their academic studies alongside playing rugby. The academy is also based at Well Hall.

== Notable players ==
See also Category:Blackheath F.C. players

- David Allen – openside flanker who played at Club for 13 seasons between 2004 and 2016, scoring 147 league tries from 274 appearances and becoming the all-time top try scorer in tier 3. Gained 8 caps for the England Counties XV as well as appearing for the Barbarians.
- (England) Harold Dingwall Bateson.
- (England) Thomas Batson
- (Scotland) Norman Bruce
- (England) Mike Bulpitt
- (England) George Burton (rugby union)
- (Scotland) Mike Campbell-Lamerton.
- Charles Arthur Crompton, played in England's first international
- (Scotland) Walter Michael Dickson
- (Scotland) John Douglas
- (Scotland) Hector Forsayth
- (England) Edward Fraser
- (England) C.B. Fry
- (New Zealand) John Gallagher, All Black and member of the team that won the inaugural Rugby World Cup in 1987.
- Stephen Gray, played for Canada 1987,91,95 World Cups.
- (United Kingdom) Thomas Gubb
- (England) Stan Harris
- (United States) Dhani Jones
- Aadel Kardooni, England A
- (England) Frank Mitchell.
- (United Kingdom) John Selwyn Moll
- (Germany) Raynor Parkinson
- (South Africa) JEC 'Birdie' Partridge
- (England) Alexander William Pearson (born 1854)
- Charles Pillman. Played for England 18 times before WW1.
- Robert Pillman. Charles Pillman's younger brother who played for England against France in 1914 and was killed in Belgium in 1916
- (Scotland) Hamish Scott
- (England) E H D Sewell sports writer and cricketer
- Charles Sherrard (1849–1938), played in England's first international
- (England) Joe Simpson.
- (England) Mickey Skinner "The Munch".
- Stephen Smith. Five England caps
- (England) Graham Standing
- Frederick Stokes (1850–1929), the first captain of the England national rugby union team.
- Lennard Stokes (1856–1933), former captain of the England national rugby union team.
- (England) Henry Taylor (rugby union)
- (England) Rob Webber.

=== Fictional players ===
- Dr. Watson, character from the Sherlock Holmes stories

== Honours ==
- Middlesex Sevens (2): 1932, 1958
- Gala Sevens (1): 1957
- Kent Cup (16): 1891, 1972, 1977, 1978, 1980, 1981, 1982, 1983, 1984, 1985, 1986, 1987, 1996, 2003, 2009, 2013
- Glengarth Sevens Main Event (1): 1982
- Glengarth Sevens Davenport Plate (1): 1983
- National Division Three South (1): 2003–04
- National League 2 East (1): 2022–23
- National League 1 (1) promotion play-off: 2025–26

== See also ==
- Rugby union in London
