= Lennard Stokes =

England international rugby union player

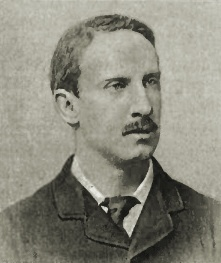
- Born: Lennard Stokes; 12 February 1856 Greenwich
- Died: 3 May 1933 (aged 77) Alton, Hants
- School: Sydney College, Bath
- University: Guy's Hospital Medical School
- Occupation: doctor

Rugby union career
- Position: Three-quarters
Senior career
Years	Team	Apps	(Points)
1874–81	Guy's Hospital FC		
1873–81	Blackheath FC		
International career
Years	Team	Apps	(Points)
1875–1881	England	12	

Dr. Lennard Stokes was a rugby union international who represented England from 1875 to 1881. He also captained his country on five occasions, notably in the first ever match against Wales. Like his brother Frederick Stokes, after captaining his country he went on to become the president of the Rugby Football Union.

== Early life ==
Lennard Stokes was born on 12 February 1856 in Greenwich, the son of Henry Graham Stokes, Proctor to the Admiralty and solicitor, and his wife Elizabeth Sewell. He was one of at least nine children (six brothers and three sisters). Unlike his brother Frederick, who attended Rugby School, he attended Sydney College in Bath. He then studied medicine at Guy's Hospital, becoming M.R.C.S. in 1881 and L.R.C.P. in 1882.

== Rugby career ==
Lennard began to play for Blackheath Football Club when he was seventeen, following in the footsteps of his older brothers, notably the first England international captain and at the time captain of Blackheath, Frederick Stokes. Like his brother he became captain of Blackheath and under his captaincy the club grew in reputation. Lennard was responsible for Blackheath acquiring the Rectory Field, on which a number of international matches were played. During the five seasons from 1876 to 1881 that Lennard Stokes captained the club, Blackheath won 68 games and lost only 6 out of a total 83 played.

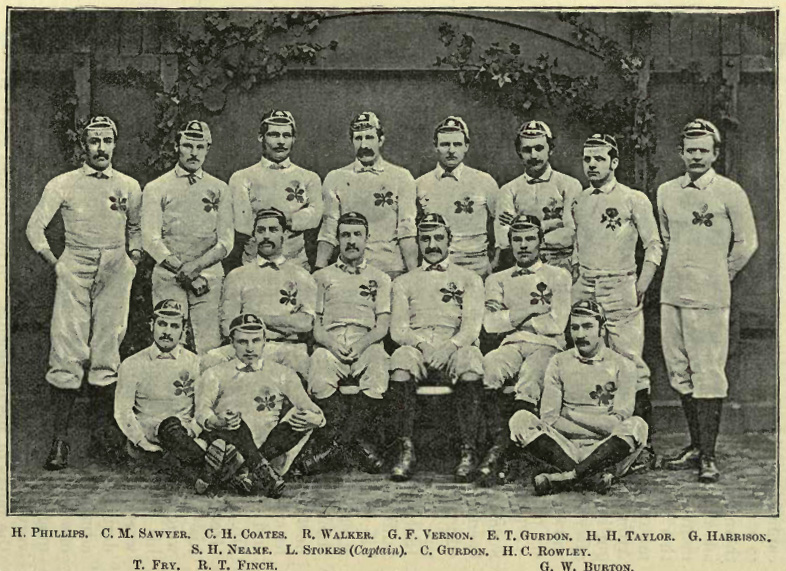
1880 England team captained by Lennard Stokes to face Scotland

He made his international debut as a 19-year-old on 15 February 1875 at The Oval in the England vs Ireland match. Of his 12 caps he was on the winning team eight times, and he captained his country on five occasions, including the first ever international against Wales on 19 February 1881 at Richardson's Field, Blackheath, when he played full back. Having changed at the Princess of Wales public house half a mile from the ground, England faced Wales for the first time and under Stokes' leadership won by 7 goals to nil, one dropped goal and six tries to nil. Stokes retired from international service at the end of the 1881 season. He played his final match for England on 19 March 1881 at Edinburgh in the Scotland vs England match. His service to rugby continued, however, and he served as president of the Rugby Football Union for three years from 1886 to 1888 aged just 30 when he began his term. In his international career he played in both the last game of the 20 a-side era in 1876 against Scotland, and the first of the 15 a-side in 1877 against Ireland.

Of his ability, Arthur Budd, president of the RFU from 1888 to 1889, said in 1892 that "I do not believe that there is a three-quarter back playing, who, if we could transplant him to the past, could cover the entire field as Lennard Stokes used to.", and Arthur Guillemard, president of the RFU from 1878 to 1882, said, also in 1892, "it is not too much to say that at this post his equal, either in science or play, has never been seen from the date of the foundation of the Union.". Steve Lewis, author of numerous books on the history of rugby union, commented that "It was with much justification that he was hailed as the greatest player of his day."

== Cricketing career ==
Stokes, again like his brother Frederick, played cricket for Blackheath Cricket Club and for Kent from 1877 to 1880. He made his first-class debut for Kent on 4 June 1877 in the seven-wicket victory against Hampshire. He played two more matches during the 1877 season, but did not appear for Kent over the following two campaigns. He played for an R Page XI against Colchester Garrison in a one-day first-class match on 12 August 1879. Stokes made his final first-class appearance on 22 July 1880, scoring the winning runs in a 10-wicket win over Sussex.

== Career and later life ==
After qualification as a doctor he served as housesurgeon and resident obstetrical officer at Guy's, and then began general practice at Blackheath. For a number of years he was honorary surgeon to St. John's Hospital, Lewisham. Approaching sixty years of age, in 1921 he went to practise in Hampshire. He died at Hurstbourne Tarrant, near Andover, Hampshire, on 3 May 1933 having suffered with indifferent health for a number of months.

== See also ==
- List of English cricket and rugby union players

== Bibliography ==
- Carlaw, Derek (2020). Kent County Cricketers, A to Z: Part One (1806–1914) (PDF). Cardiff: ACS.

Sporting positions
Preceded by Frank Reginald Adams	English National Rugby Union Captain; 1880–1881	Succeeded by Charles Gurdon
Preceded by Frederick Currey	Rugby Football Union President; 1886–1888	Succeeded by Arthur Budd
