= Calcutta Cup =

Rugby competition between Scotland and England

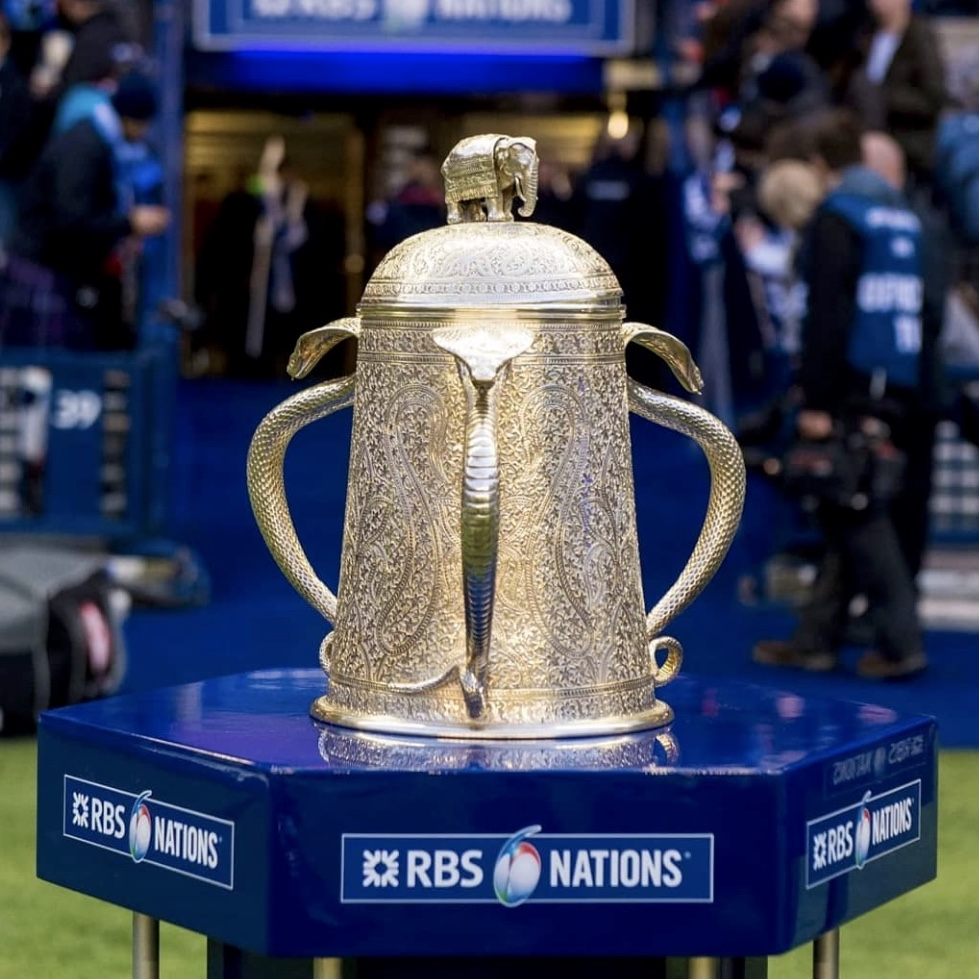
- Sport: Rugby union
- Awarded for: Winner of England–Scotland fixture (Note: The trophy is awarded to the winner of the annual one-off England–Scotland fixture played in the Six Nations Championship.)
- Country: England; Scotland

History
- First award: 10 March 1879; 147 years, 211 days ago
- Editions: 133 (2026)
- Most wins: England (83) (Note: The number given is the figure of how many times the team has won the Calcutta Cup; in the event of a draw, the most recent winner of a Calcutta Cup encounter is designated the winner and retains the trophy.)
- Most recent: Scotland (2026)

The Calcutta Cup is the trophy awarded to the winner of the rugby match between teams of England and Scotland played annually in the Six Nations Championship. Like the match itself (England–Scotland), the Calcutta Cup is the oldest trophy contested between any two international rugby union teams, pre-dating the Bledisloe Cup (Australia–New Zealand) by more than half a century. It is also the oldest of several trophies awarded under the umbrella of the Six Nations Championship, which include the Millennium Trophy (England–Ireland), Centenary Quaich (Ireland–Scotland), Giuseppe Garibaldi Trophy (France–Italy), Auld Alliance Trophy (France–Scotland), the Doddie Weir Cup (Scotland–Wales) and the Cuttitta Cup (Italy–Scotland).

== History ==
=== Calcutta Club ===
On Christmas Day in 1872 a game of rugby union football was played in Calcutta, British India by a group of forty people (twenty-a-side), with one team representing England and the other Scotland. (Note: Although the match has often been said to represent England and Scotland, it has also been reported to have been representative of England and the other Home Nations.) Following this match, and the growth of British Sport in India, the Calcutta Rugby Football Club was formally established in January the following year by immigrants, former students of Rugby School, and soldiers of the Royal East Kent Regiment. In 1874, the club joined the Rugby Football Union (RFU). By 1878, the club's diminishing members withdrew club funds, a total of ₹270, (Note: Equivalent to ₹equivalent to $99,655 in 2026 in 2020.) and had them melted down to make a trophy. The trophy was presented by the club to the RFU and was used as “the best means of doing some lasting good for the cause of Rugby Football.”

=== The cup ===
The domed lid is surmounted by an elephant which is, it is said, copied from the Viceroy's own stock. The inscription on the Cup's wooden base reads: The Calcutta Cup.

There is an anomaly in the recording of the winning country on the base of the Cup. It was first played for in 1879, but the plinth shows records extending back to the first international in 1871.

While the original was handmade by Indian craftsmen, the replicas were made using modern technology.

In 1988 the cup was damaged by the antics of some drunken players, including England number eight Dean Richards and Scotland flanker John Jeffrey who played football with the Calcutta Cup along Princes Street in Edinburgh. Jeffrey received a six-month ban from the Scottish Rugby Union (SRU), whilst Richards was given a one-match sentence from England.

== Competition ==
Despite the initial request of the Calcutta Club that the trophy be used as rugby's answer to football's FA Cup, the RFU refused to turn the Calcutta Cup into a knock-out competition for English club sides. They believed that "competitiveness" ran against the amateur ethos and instead decided that a game should be played each year between England and Scotland and whoever wins should keep it for that year. The first Calcutta Cup match was played at Raeburn Place, Edinburgh, on 10 March 1879 and ended in a draw; Scotland scored a drop goal and England a goal. The following year on 28 February 1880 England became the first winners of the Calcutta Cup when they defeated Scotland by two goals & three tries to one goal in Manchester. Matches have continued on an annual basis except for two interruptions due to the World Wars between 1915–1919 and 1940–1946.

As of 2025, 132 Calcutta Cup matches have taken place. Currently, this game is the annual match between the two nations in the Six Nations Championship. The ground alternates between Murrayfield Stadium in Edinburgh (in even years) and Twickenham Stadium in London (in odd years).

In 2004, the two countries' rugby governing bodies, the Rugby Football Union (England) and the Scottish Rugby Union, were considering a plan to add a second Calcutta Cup fixture each year, outside the Six Nations Championship. The second fixture would be hosted by the away nation in the Six Nations fixture of the same year. Under that plan, one nation would have to win both matches to take the Cup off its current holder. Due to a largely unfavourable reaction, the proposal was dropped.

== Results ==
=== Results summary ===
Cup wins/holds (Note: Aggregate games each team has held the cup.)
Team	Gms.
England	83
Scotland	49

Match wins
Team	Wins
England	72
Scotland	45
Draws	16

Year	Date	Winner	Score	Stadium and location	Holder (aggregate times held)
1879	10 March	draw	(0) 1G–1G (1T)	Raeburn Place, Edinburgh	—N/a
1880	28 February	England (1)	(5T) 2G–1G (1T)	Whalley Range, Manchester	England (2)
1881	19 March	draw	(2T) 1G–1G (1T)	Raeburn Place, Edinburgh	England (2)
1882	4 March	Scotland (1)	(0) 0G–0G (2T)	Whalley Range, Manchester	Scotland (1)
1883	3 March	England (2)	(1T) 0G–0G (2T)	Raeburn Place, Edinburgh	England (7)
1884	1 March	England (3)	(1T) 1G–0G (1T)	Rectory Field, Blackheath	England (7)
1885	Not played				England (7)
1886	13 March	draw	(0) 0G–0G (0)	Raeburn Place, Edinburgh	England (7)
1887	5 March	draw	(1T) 0G–0G (1T)	Whalley Range, Manchester	England (7)
1888	Not played				England (7)
1889	Not played				England (7)
1890	1 March	England (4)	0–6	Raeburn Place, Edinburgh	England (7)
1891	7 March	Scotland (2)	3–9	Athletic Ground, Richmond	Scotland (2)
1892	5 March	England (5)	0–5	Raeburn Place, Edinburgh	England (8)
1893	4 March	Scotland (3)	0–8	Headingley Stadium, Leeds	Scotland (6)
1894	17 March	Scotland (4)	6–0	Raeburn Place, Edinburgh	Scotland (6)
1895	9 March	Scotland (5)	3–6	Athletic Ground, Richmond	Scotland (6)
1896	14 March	Scotland (6)	11–0	Cathkin Park, Glasgow	Scotland (6)
1897	13 March	England (6)	12–3	Fallowfield Stadium, Manchester	England (10)
1898	12 March	draw	3–3	Powderhall Stadium, Edinburgh	England (10)
1899	11 March	Scotland (7)	0–5	Rectory Field, Blackheath	Scotland (9)
1900	10 March	draw	0–0	Inverleith, Edinburgh	Scotland (9)
1901	9 March	Scotland (8)	3–18	Rectory Field, Blackheath	Scotland (9)
1902	15 March	England (7)	3–6	Inverleith, Edinburgh	England (11)
1903	21 March	Scotland (9)	6–10	Athletic Ground, Richmond	Scotland (12)
1904	19 March	Scotland (10)	6–3	Inverleith, Edinburgh	Scotland (12)
1905	18 March	Scotland (11)	0–8	Athletic Ground, Richmond	Scotland (12)
1906	17 March	England (8)	3–9	Inverleith, Edinburgh	England (12)
1907	16 March	Scotland (12)	3–8	Rectory Field, Blackheath	Scotland (15)
1908	21 March	Scotland (13)	16–10	Inverleith, Edinburgh	Scotland (15)
1909	20 March	Scotland (14)	8–18	Athletic Ground, Richmond	Scotland (15)
1910	19 March	England (9)	5–14	Inverleith, Edinburgh	England (14)
1911	18 March	England (10)	13–8	Twickenham Stadium, London	England (14)
1912	16 March	Scotland (15)	8–3	Inverleith, Edinburgh	Scotland (16)
1913	15 March	England (11)	3–0	Twickenham Stadium, London	England (21)
1914	21 March	England (12)	15–16	Inverleith, Edinburgh	England (21)
1915	Not played due to World War I				England (21)
1916	Not played due to World War I				England (21)
1917	Not played due to World War I				England (21)
1918	Not played due to World War I				England (21)
1919	Not played due to World War I				England (21)
1920	20 March	England (13)	13–4	Twickenham Stadium, London	England (21)
1921	19 March	England (14)	0–18	Inverleith, Edinburgh	England (21)
1922	18 March	England (15)	11–5	Twickenham Stadium, London	England (21)
1923	17 March	England (16)	6–8	Inverleith, Edinburgh	England (21)
1924	15 March	England (17)	19–0	Twickenham Stadium, London	England (21)
1925	21 March	Scotland (16)	14–11	Murrayfield Stadium, Edinburgh	Scotland (19)
1926	20 March	Scotland (17)	9–17	Twickenham Stadium, London	Scotland (19)
1927	19 March	Scotland (18)	21–13	Murrayfield Stadium, Edinburgh	Scotland (19)
1928	17 March	England (18)	6–0	Twickenham Stadium, London	England (22)
1929	16 March	Scotland (19)	12–6	Murrayfield Stadium, Edinburgh	Scotland (22)
1930	16 March	draw	0–0	Twickenham Stadium, London	Scotland (22)
1931	21 March	Scotland (20)	28–19	Murrayfield Stadium, Edinburgh	Scotland (22)
1932	19 March	England (19)	16–3	Twickenham Stadium, London	England (23)
1933	18 March	Scotland (21)	3–0	Murrayfield Stadium, Edinburgh	Scotland (23)
1934	17 March	England (20)	6–3	Twickenham Stadium, London	England (24)
1935	16 March	Scotland (22)	10–7	Murrayfield Stadium, Edinburgh	Scotland (24)
1936	21 March	England (21)	9–8	Twickenham Stadium, London	England (26)
1937	20 March	England (22)	3–6	Murrayfield Stadium, Edinburgh	England (26)
1938	19 March	Scotland (23)	16–21	Twickenham Stadium, London	Scotland (25)
1939	18 March	England (23)	6–9	Murrayfield Stadium, Edinburgh	England (28)
1940	Not played due to World War II				England (28)
1941	Not played due to World War II				England (28)
1942	Not played due to World War II				England (28)
1943	Not played due to World War II				England (28)
1944	Not played due to World War II				England (28)
1945	Not played due to World War II				England (28)
1946	Not played due to World War II				England (28)
1947	15 March	England (24)	24–5	Twickenham Stadium, London	England (28)
1948	20 March	Scotland (24)	6–3	Murrayfield Stadium, Edinburgh	Scotland (26)
1949	19 March	England (25)	6–3	Twickenham Stadium, London	England (29)
1950	18 March	Scotland (25)	13–11	Murrayfield Stadium, Edinburgh	Scotland (27)
1951	17 March	England (26)	5–3	Twickenham Stadium, London	England (42)
1952	15 March	England (27)	3–19	Murrayfield Stadium, Edinburgh	England (42)
1953	21 March	England (28)	26–8	Twickenham Stadium, London	England (42)
1954	20 March	England (29)	3–13	Murrayfield Stadium, Edinburgh	England (42)
1955	19 March	England (30)	9–6	Twickenham Stadium, London	England (42)
1956	17 March	England (31)	6–11	Murrayfield Stadium, Edinburgh	England (42)
1957	16 March	England (32)	16–3	Twickenham Stadium, London	England (42)
1958	15 March	draw	3–3	Murrayfield Stadium, Edinburgh	England (42)
1959	21 March	draw	3–3	Twickenham Stadium, London	England (42)
1960	19 March	England (33)	12–21	Murrayfield Stadium, Edinburgh	England (42)
1961	18 March	England (34)	6–0	Twickenham Stadium, London	England (42)
1962	17 March	draw	3–3	Murrayfield Stadium, Edinburgh	England (42)
1963	16 March	England (35)	10–8	Twickenham Stadium, London	England (42)
1964	21 March	Scotland (26)	15–6	Murrayfield Stadium, Edinburgh	Scotland (30)
1965	20 March	draw	3–3	Twickenham Stadium, London	Scotland (30)
1966	19 March	Scotland (27)	6–3	Murrayfield Stadium, Edinburgh	Scotland (30)
1967	18 March	England (36)	27–14	Twickenham Stadium, London	England (45)
1968	16 March	England (37)	6–8	Murrayfield Stadium, Edinburgh	England (45)
1969	15 March	England (38)	8–3	Twickenham Stadium, London	England (45)
1970	21 February	Scotland (28)	14–5	Murrayfield Stadium, Edinburgh	Scotland (33)
1971	20 March	Scotland (29)	15–16	Twickenham Stadium, London	Scotland (33)
1972	18 March	Scotland (30)	23–9	Murrayfield Stadium, Edinburgh	Scotland (33)
1973	17 March	England (39)	15–16	Twickenham Stadium, London	England (46)
1974	2 February	Scotland (31)	16–14	Murrayfield Stadium, Edinburgh	Scotland (34)
1975	15 March	England (40)	7–6	Twickenham Stadium, London	England (47)
1976	21 February	Scotland (32)	22–12	Murrayfield Stadium, Edinburgh	Scotland (35)
1977	15 January	England (41)	26–6	Twickenham Stadium, London	England (53)
1978	4 March	England (42)	0–15	Murrayfield Stadium, Edinburgh	England (53)
1979	3 February	draw	7–7	Twickenham Stadium, London	England (53)
1980	15 March	England (43)	18–30	Murrayfield Stadium, Edinburgh	England (53)
1981	21 February	England (44)	23–17	Twickenham Stadium, London	England (53)
1982	16 January	draw	9–9	Murrayfield Stadium, Edinburgh	England (53)
1983	5 March	Scotland (33)	12–22	Twickenham Stadium, London	Scotland (37)
1984	4 February	Scotland (34)	18–6	Murrayfield Stadium, Edinburgh	Scotland (37)
1985	16 March	England (45)	10–7	Twickenham Stadium, London	England (54)
1986	15 February	Scotland (35)	33–6	Murrayfield Stadium, Edinburgh	Scotland (38)
1987	4 April	England (46)	21–12	Twickenham Stadium, London	England (57)
1988	5 March	England (47)	6–9	Murrayfield Stadium, Edinburgh	England (57)
1989	4 February	draw	12–12	Twickenham Stadium, London	England (57)
1990	17 March	Scotland (36)	13–7	Murrayfield Stadium, Edinburgh	Scotland (39)
1991	16 February	England (48)	21–12	Twickenham Stadium, London	England (66)
1992	18 January	England (49)	7–25	Murrayfield Stadium, Edinburgh	England (66)
1993	6 March	England (50)	26–12	Twickenham Stadium, London	England (66)
1994	5 February	England (51)	14–15	Murrayfield Stadium, Edinburgh	England (66)
1995	18 March	England (52)	24–12	Twickenham Stadium, London	England (66)
1996	2 March	England (53)	9–18	Murrayfield Stadium, Edinburgh	England (66)
1997	1 February	England (54)	41–13	Twickenham Stadium, London	England (66)
1998	22 March	England (55)	20–34	Murrayfield Stadium, Edinburgh	England (66)
1999	20 February	England (56)	24–21	Twickenham Stadium, London	England (66)
2000	2 April	Scotland (37)	19–13	Murrayfield Stadium, Edinburgh	Scotland (40)
2001	3 March	England (57)	43–3	Twickenham Stadium, London	England (71)
2002	2 February	England (58)	3–29	Murrayfield Stadium, Edinburgh	England (71)
2003	22 March	England (59)	40–9	Twickenham Stadium, London	England (71)
2004	21 February	England (60)	13–35	Murrayfield Stadium, Edinburgh	England (71)
2005	19 March	England (61)	43–22	Twickenham Stadium, London	England (71)
2006	25 February	Scotland (38)	18–12	Murrayfield Stadium, Edinburgh	Scotland (41)
2007	3 February	England (62)	42–20	Twickenham Stadium, London	England (72)
2008	8 March	Scotland (39)	15–9	Murrayfield Stadium, Edinburgh	Scotland (42)
2009	21 March	England (63)	26–12	Twickenham Stadium, London	England (81)
2010	13 March	draw	15–15	Murrayfield Stadium, Edinburgh	England (81)
2011	13 March	England (64)	22–16	Twickenham Stadium, London	England (81)
2012	4 February	England (65)	6–13	Murrayfield Stadium, Edinburgh	England (81)
2013	2 February	England (66)	38–18	Twickenham Stadium, London	England (81)
2014	8 February	England (67)	0–20	Murrayfield Stadium, Edinburgh	England (81)
2015	14 March	England (68)	25–13	Twickenham Stadium, London	England (81)
2016	6 February	England (69)	9–15	Murrayfield Stadium, Edinburgh	England (81)
2017	11 March	England (70)	61–21	Twickenham Stadium, London	England (81)
2018	24 February	Scotland (40)	25–13	Murrayfield Stadium, Edinburgh	Scotland (44)
2019	16 March	draw	38–38	Twickenham Stadium, London	Scotland (44)
2020	8 February	England (71)	6–13	Murrayfield Stadium, Edinburgh	England (82)
2021	6 February	Scotland (41)	6–11	Twickenham Stadium, London	Scotland (48)
2022	5 February	Scotland (42)	20–17	Murrayfield Stadium, Edinburgh	Scotland (48)
2023	4 February	Scotland (43)	23–29	Twickenham Stadium, London	Scotland (48)
2024	24 February	Scotland (44)	30–21	Murrayfield Stadium, Edinburgh	Scotland (48)
2025	22 February	England (72)	16–15	Twickenham Stadium, London	England (83)
2026	14 February	Scotland (45)	31–20	Murrayfield Stadium, Edinburgh	Scotland (49)

== Records ==
The current record number of points scored by a player in a Calcutta Cup game was set by Jonny Wilkinson in 2007 when he scored 27 points (1 try, 2 conversions, 5 penalties, 1 drop goal). The previous record of 24 points was held by Rob Andrew.

== Other Calcutta Cups ==
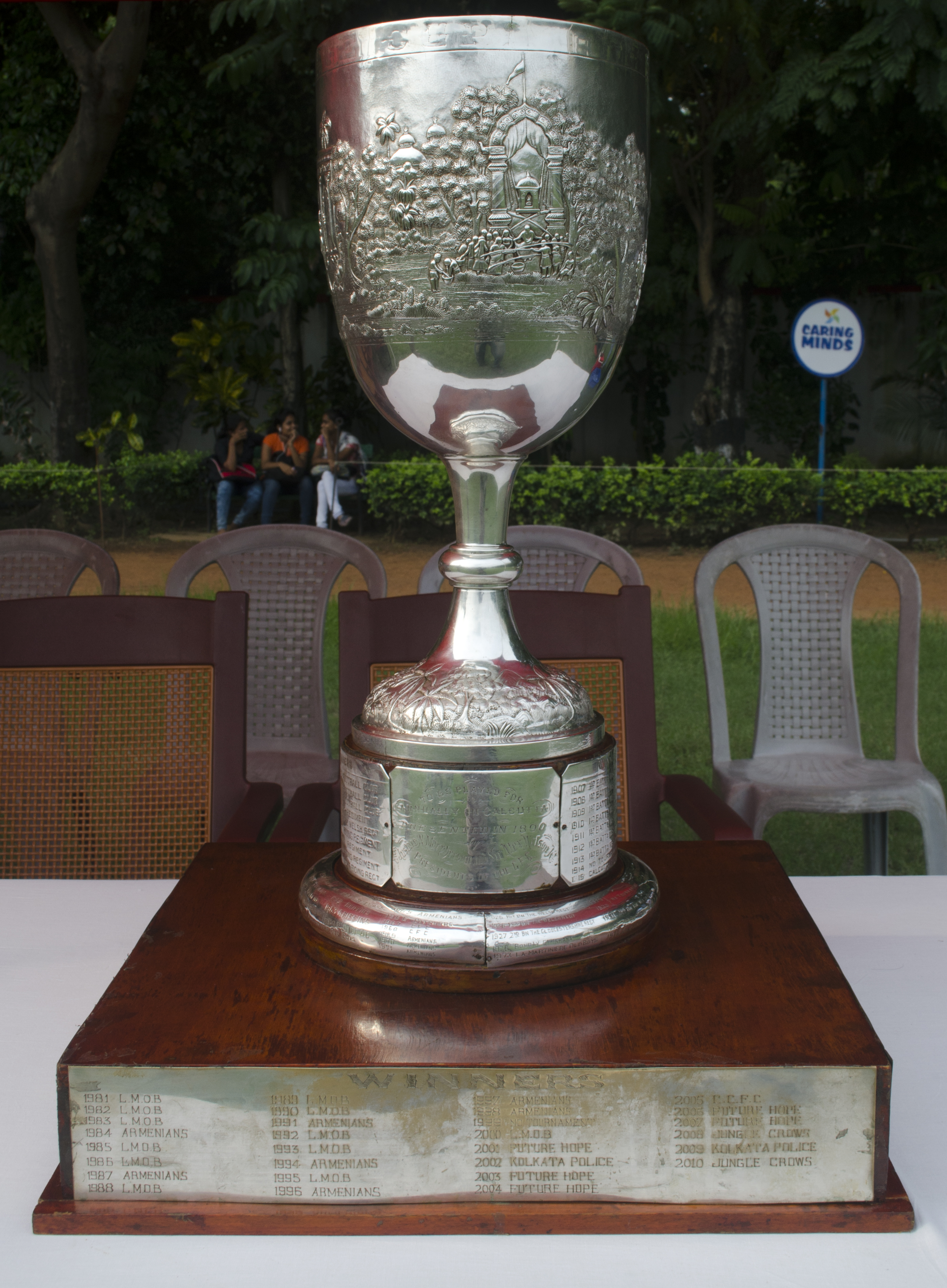
The Other Calcutta Cup Trophy

In 1884, Calcutta Cricket and Football Club again set up a rugby section and in 1890 set up an inter club trophy, the Calcutta Rugby Union Challenge Cup, promptly christened the Calcutta Cup.

The 2007 edition of the Cup was held by Jungle Crows, in which Future Hope Harlequins defeated CC&FC in final. The second division trophy was won by Calcutta Cricket and Football Club Panthers.

The original and oldest Calcutta Cup is a silver trophy played for annually by the members of Royal Blackheath Golf Club. It was a gift from the Royal Calcutta Golf Club in response to the presentation of a medal given by Blackheath. It is made from melted down silver rupees, reputedly from the same batch of melted down silver rupees as the Rugby Union Cup played for between England and Scotland. The cup arrived in London in 1875. It was first played for in December 1875 three years before the first Calcutta Cup match between England and Scotland. The Cup held by Royal Blackheath Golf Club has only two handles unlike the well known Calcutta Cup. It is only in recent years that the history of the original Calcutta Cup has been appreciated by sporting historians.

Royal Blackheath Golf Club members had close links with Blackheath Football Club (Rugby) which was one of the most prominent clubs in the early years of the Rugby Football Union. Members of both clubs served in India in the 1870s. This link is the most likely explanation for the creation of a similar cup being created by the Calcutta Rugby Club a few years later and becoming the world-famous Calcutta Cup.

== See also ==
- Triple Crown Trophy, whoever (if any) wins all games between England, Ireland, Scotland and Wales in the Six Nations
- Giuseppe Garibaldi Trophy, for winners of France v. Italy in the Six Nations
- Millennium Trophy, for winners of England v. Ireland in the Six Nations
- Le Crunch, a long-standing rivalry between England and France
- England–Scotland football rivalry in association football
- Rugby union trophies and awards
- Rugby union in India
