= Henry Taylor (rugby union, born 1858) =

England international rugby union player

- Born: Henry Herbert Taylor; 21 September 1858 Greenwich, London, England
- Died: 25 May 1942 (aged 83) Steyning, West Sussex, England
- School: Merchant Taylors' School

Rugby union career
- Position: Halfback
Amateur team(s)
Years	Team	Apps	(Points)
–	Blackheath		
–	St George's Hospital		
International career
Years	Team	Apps	(Points)
1879–1882	England	5	(Tries:6)

Henry Taylor was a rugby union international who represented England from 1879 to 1882.

== Early life ==
Henry Taylor was born on 21 September 1858 in Greenwich. He attended Merchant Taylors' School.

== Rugby union career ==
Taylor made his international debut on 10 March 1879 at Edinburgh in the Scotland vs England match. Of the 5 matches he played for his national side he was on the winning side on 3 occasions. He was to have played in a sixth match but lost the night mail train to Scotland. Although not noted for his dropping powers, he was considered a first-rate halfback, who was "wonderfully quick on the ball and at utilising an opening in his adversaries' defence. He ran low, and very strongly, though not very fast, and used his arms with great effect; his tactics in point of attack were his best points, and he did excellent service for England." He played his final match for England on 4 March 1882 at Whalley Range, Manchester in the England vs Scotland match.
