= George Burton (rugby union) =

English rugby union player

- Born: George William Burton; 29 August 1855 Wakefield, Yorkshire
- Died: 17 September 1890 (aged 35) West Hampstead, London
- School: Winchester College

Rugby union career
- Position: Forward
Senior career
Years	Team	Apps	(Points)
- Blackheath F.C.
International career
Years	Team	Apps	(Points)
1879–1881	England	6	(Goals:0; Tries:6; Conv:0; Pens:0; Drop:0)

George Burton (1855-1890) was a rugby union international who represented England from 1879 to 1881.

== Early life ==
George Burton was born on 29 August 1855 in Wakefield. He attended Winchester College.

== Rugby union career ==
Burton made his international debut on 10 March 1879 at Edinburgh in the Scotland vs England match. He was considered a very fast and "brilliant player" when the ball was in the open. A good friend of Arthur Budd, he was similar in style in that he was known to do little work in the scrummage itself, but contributed significantly to their club, Blackheath FC and England. He also captained Blackheath for a time. Also considered a fine dribbler, attributed to his education at Winchester, and a sure tackle. Of the 6 matches he played for his national side he was on the winning side on 4 occasions. He played his final match for England on 19 March 1881 at Edinburgh in the Scotland vs England match.
