= James Campbell (rugby union) =

Scotland international rugby union player

- Born: James Alexander Campbell; 1 July 1858 Lake Athabasca, British North America
- Died: 19 June 1902 (aged 43) Selkirk, Manitoba, Canada
- School: Merchiston Castle School

Rugby union career
- Position: Half Back
Amateur team(s)
Years	Team	Apps	(Points)
-	Merchistonians		
–	Glasgow Academicals		
Provincial / State sides
Years	Team	Apps	(Points)
1880	Glasgow District		
1881	West of Scotland District		
International career
Years	Team	Apps	(Points)
1878-81	Scotland	5	(0)

James Alexander Campbell (1 July 1858 – 19 June 1902) was a Scotland international rugby union player.

== Rugby Union career ==
=== Amateur career ===
Campbell attended Merchiston Castle School, which he was attending when capped in 1878.

For his final three internationals he was playing club rugby for Glasgow Academicals.

=== Provincial career ===
He was capped by Glasgow District for the inter-city match against Edinburgh District on 4 December 1880.

He was capped by West of Scotland District for their match against East of Scotland District on 5 February 1881.

=== International career ===
He made his debut for Scotland in 1878 at the young age of 19.

He was capped for Scotland between 1878 and 1881, and he was amongst the youngest player ever to be capped for Scotland – he was nearly twenty years old when he was capped against England on 4 March 1878.

He earned a total of 5 caps for Scotland.
