= Arthur Budd (rugby union) =

English rugby union player

- Born: 14 October 1853 Bristol, England
- Died: 27 August 1899 (aged 45) London, England
- School: Clifton College
- University: Pembroke College, Cambridge
- Notable relative: William Budd (father)
- Occupation: Physician

Rugby union career
- Position: Forward
International career
Years	Team	Apps	(Points)
1878–81	England	5	

Arthur Budd (14 October 1853 – 27 August 1899) was an English international rugby union player.

== Biography ==
Budd was the second born son of prominent Bristol physician William Budd, who is best known for identifying the contagious nature of typhoid fever. His uncle, George Budd, was also a physician of note. He learned his rugby while a pupil at Clifton College and after matriculating in 1872 went on to Pembroke College, Cambridge, for further studies.

A forward, Budd was a Cambridge University varsity player, but attracted the most attention for his later career. He had a season as captain of Edinburgh Wanderers in 1877-78, then spent over a decade with London club Blackheath, which he also captained in 1887-88. His England career brought a total of five caps between 1878 and 1881.

Budd served as president of the Rugby Football Union in the 1888-89 season, uniquely while still active as a player. He was a physician by profession and well known as a writer on rugby union, publishing a comprehensive book on the code in 1899.

== See also ==
- List of England national rugby union players
