= Raeburn Place =

Main street of the suburb of Stockbridge in Edinburgh, Scotland

Coordinates: 55°57′38.89″N 3°12′47.23″W

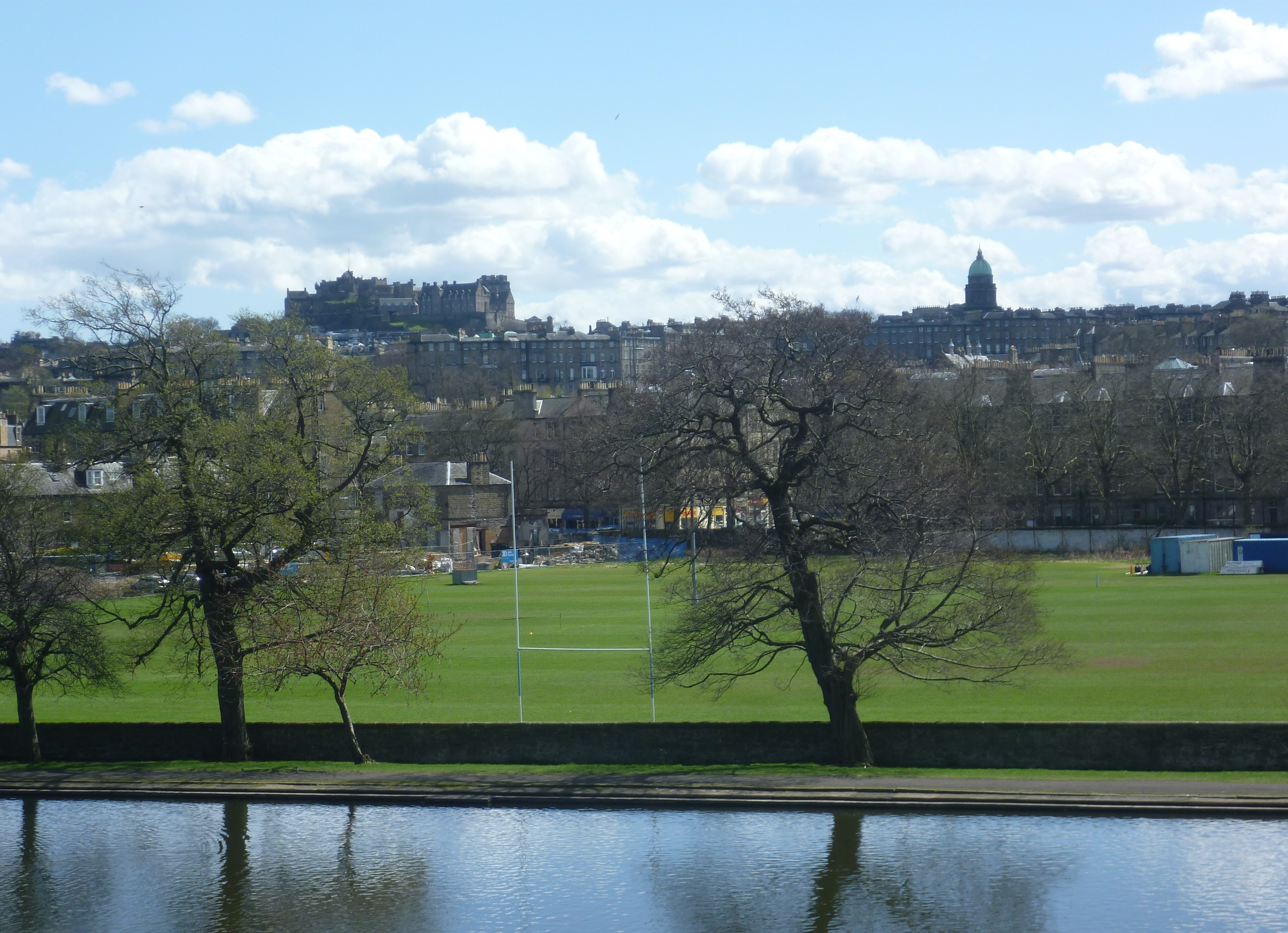
Raeburn Place, May 2013

Raeburn Place is the main street of the suburb of Stockbridge, Edinburgh, Scotland, and the name of the playing fields there. It is also the location of the first International Rugby match between Scotland and England.

== Rugby ==
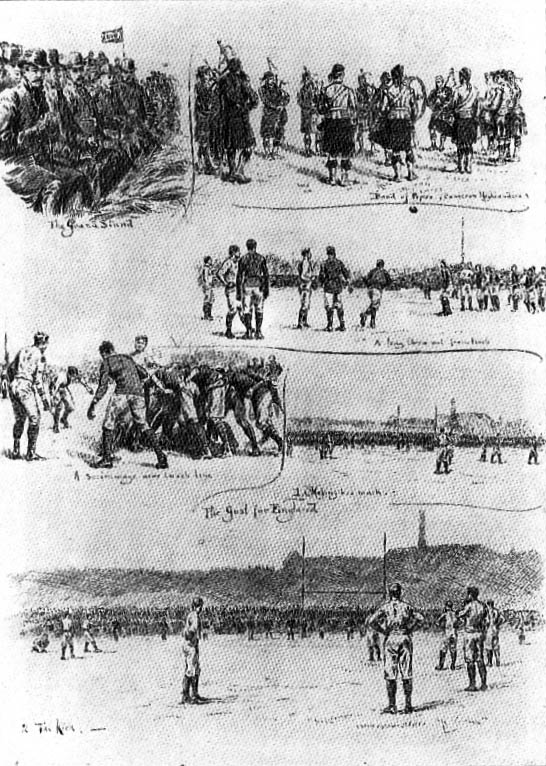
Illustration of a Calcutta Cup match played at Raeburn Place, 1890

The first ever international rugby football game was played on the playing fields at Raeburn Place on 27 March 1871 between England and Scotland. It was won by Scotland. Scotland continued to play their home internationals in Raeburn Place, then at Inverleith Sports Ground until the Scottish Rugby Union acquired Murray's Field (as it was known then), the Edinburgh Polo ground, in the 1920s.

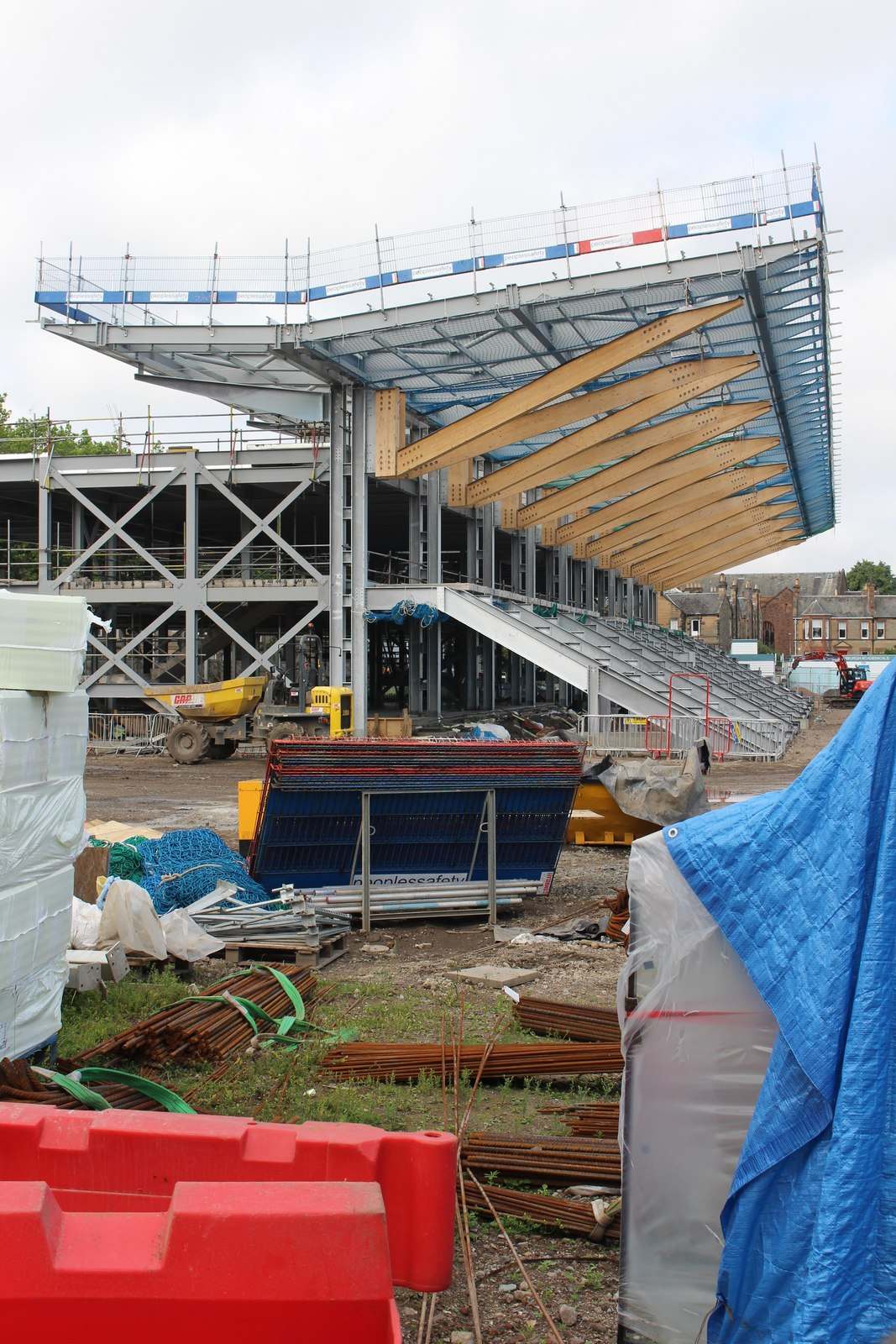
New grandstand at Raeburn Place under construction, 2019

The playing fields are still used by the Edinburgh Academy sports branches, Edinburgh Academical Football Club and Edinburgh Academical Cricket Club.

In 1994, the Women's Rugby World Cup final between England and the USA, which England won, was played at Raeburn Place. It was also the site of the first ever women's rugby union international for both Scotland and Ireland, occurring when the two nations met in 1993.

== Cricket ==
Within Raeburn Place, opposite the rugby ground, lies Grange Cricket Club. England was the host of the 1999 Cricket World Cup, but two of Scotland's games were held there. On 24 May 1999 at The Grange, Bangladesh played Scotland, and on 31 May 1999, Scotland played New Zealand.

== See also ==
- Rugby union in Scotland
- History of rugby union in Scotland
- Cricket in Scotland
