= 1893 Scottish Athletics Championships =

Outdoor track and field competition

- Dates: 17 June
- Host city: Glasgow, Scotland
- Venue: Hampden Park
- Level: Senior
- Type: Outdoor
- Events: 13

The 1893 Scottish Athletics Championships were the eleventh national athletics championships to be held in Scotland. They were held under the auspices of the Scottish Amateur Athletic Association at Hampden Park, Glasgow, on Saturday 17 June 1893.

== Background ==
The day was hot, and dry, with a slight easterly breeze. A record crowd of eight thousand spectators saw the first event, the 100 yards, in which two of the entrants did not appear so no heats were necessary and it was run as a straight final, won with "ridiculous ease," by Alfred Downer in his first appearance at the championship. One hour later he repeated the feat and won the 220 yards by a similar margin, beating last year's champion in both events. In the quarter mile, not run in lanes, Downer was slightly fortunate as McCulloch was hampered by a collision with Mollison, but entering the straight Downer took the lead and was never headed. A magnificent trio of wins that many commentators said would never be repeated.

Kenneth Whittom, who finished second in the hammer, had won the shot at the very first championship in 1883. Robert Mitchell, who had won the half-mile the previous four times, did not defend his title since he had unfortunately lost his wife a few days before the championships.

The 3 miles walk was a fiasco, with only two competitors, neither of whom wanted to lead, and one of them stopped for no obvious reason within sight of the finish. This was the slowest winning time in the entire history of the event, the next slowest being 25:20 in 1891. The event was subsequently withdrawn from the programme and not held again until 1904, and was last held in 1948.

== Results summary ==
100 yards
| Pos | Athlete | Time |
|---|---|---|
| 1. | Alfred R. Downer (Edinburgh H.) | 10 3/5 |
| 2. | Douglas R. McCulloch (Helensburgh AC) | 4 yards |
| 3. | W. A. Kerr (West of Scotland FC) | |

220 yards
| Pos | Athlete | Time |
|---|---|---|
| 1. | Alfred R. Downer (Edinburgh H.) | 23 2/5 |
| 2. | Douglas R. McCulloch (Helensburgh AC) | 3 yards |
| 3. | W. A. Kerr (West of Scotland FC.) | |

440 yards
| Pos | Athlete | Time |
|---|---|---|
| 1. | Alfred R. Downer (Edinburgh H.) | 53 2/5 |
| 2. | Douglas R. McCulloch (Helensburgh AC) | 2 yards |
| 3. | Hector A. Mollison (Glasgow Un.) | |

880 yards
| Pos | Athlete | Time |
|---|---|---|
| 1. | Walter Malcolm (Morton FC) | 2:01 4/5 |
| 2. | John Hindle (St Mirren FC) | 1 1/2 yards |
| 3. | A. R. Muir (Watson's Coll. AC) | |

1 mile
| Pos | Athlete | Time |
|---|---|---|
| 1. | Andrew Hannah (Clydesdale H.) | 4:36.9 |
| 2. | John Milroy (West of Scotland H.) | 2 yards |
| 3. | R. A. Bruce (Watson's Coll. AC) | |

4 miles
| Pos | Athlete | Time |
|---|---|---|
| 1. | Andrew Hannah (Clydesdale H.) | 21:36 2/5 |
| 2. | William Robertson (Motherwell H.) | |
| 3. | Alfred Forrest (Edinburgh H.) | |

120 yard hurdles
| Pos | Athlete | Time |
|---|---|---|
| 1. | John R. Gow (Rangers FC) | |
| 2. | Andrew L. Graham (West of Scotland H.) | |

3 miles walk
| Pos | Athlete | Time |
|---|---|---|
| 1. | J. Dickison (Edinburgh H.) | 29:10 3/5 |

High jump
| Pos | Athlete | Time |
|---|---|---|
| 1. | Andrew L. Graham (West of Scotland H.) | 5ft 8in (1.72m) |

Long jump
| Pos | Athlete | Dist |
|---|---|---|
| 1. | Hugh Barr (Clydesdale H.) | 20ft 0 1/2in (6.11m) |
| 2. | Andrew L. Graham (West of Scotland H.) | 19ft 4 1/4in (5.90m) |
| 3. | Thomas Guthrie (Edinburgh Un.) | 19ft 1 1/2in (5.83m) |

Shot put
| Pos | Athlete | Dist |
|---|---|---|
| 1. | James D. Macintosh (West End ARC) | 40ft 5in (12.32m) |
| 2. | J. B. Haggerty (Glasgow) | 38ft 10in (11.83m) |

Hammer
| Pos | Athlete | Dist |
|---|---|---|
| 1. | James D. Macintosh (West End ARC) | 101ft 4in (30.88m) |
| 2. | Kenneth Whitton (Edinburgh H.) | 96ft 4in (29.36m) |
| 3. | J. Fraser (Maryhill H.) | 90ft 4in (27.54m) |

== 10 miles (track) ==
10 miles (track)
| Pos | Athlete | Time |
|---|---|---|
| 1. | Andrew Hannah (Clydesdale H.) | 55:12 3/5 |
| 2. | Sidney J. Cornish (Edinburgh H.) | |
| 3. | J. Walker (Clydesdale H.) | |

The 10-mile championship took place at Hampden Park, Glasgow, on Monday 27 March in front of, "a mere handful" of spectators. The weather was dry, but cold, and a gusty north-easterly wind was in the face of the runners as they came down the back straight.

Those starting the race did not include Peter Addison (Edinburgh H.), last year's winner, but Andrew Hannah (Clydesdale H.), reigning Scottish cross country champion and winner of this event in 1889, 1890, and 1891, was in the field, as was James Campbell (Helensburgh FC), winner of the cross country championship in 1887, Matthew Reid, the captain of Clydesdale Harriers, and Thomas Hunter (Edinburgh H.), also started. Hannah was the clear favourite but these men were widely expected to ensure that his prize was not going to be a gift.

Campbell took the lead from the start, but within a lap Hannah had moved to the front and by the time they had completed one mile Thomas Hunter had taken the lead, followed by Hannah and Sidney Cornish, formerly of Walthamstow Harriers, in London. For the next three miles Hunter and Hannah kept overtaking each other, then at four miles Hunter just stopped. As soon as Cornish overtook him he started again but as a race the event was over. Reid had stopped by half way, Hunter left the track in the sixth mile while Hannah lapped Walker and caught up to Campbell and they ran together for three laps but when Hannah passed him he too stopped. Hannah caught Cornish and ran with him for a while but with six laps to go Hannah went past and ultimately won by 600 yards. splits (Field) 1 mile: 5:10.0, 10:37.4 (5:27.4), 16:07.8 (5:30.4), 21:38.8 (5:31.0), 27:10.8 (5:32.0), 32:48.8 (5:38.0), 38:21.0 (5:32.2), 43:59.2 (5:38.2), 49:34.6 (5:35.4), 55:12.6 (5:38.0).

== See also ==
- Scottish Athletics
- Scottish Athletics Championships
