= 1891 Scottish Athletics Championships =

Outdoor track and field competition

- Dates: 20 June
- Host city: Glasgow, Scotland
- Venue: Hampden Park
- Level: Senior
- Type: Outdoor
- Events: 11

The 1891 Scottish Athletics Championships were the ninth national athletics championships held in Scotland. They were conducted under the auspices of the Scottish Amateur Athletic Association at Hampden Park, Glasgow, on Saturday 20 June 1891.

== Background ==
Fine weather drew a large crowd estimated to be around 4000 spectators, a huge improvement on former years. It was attributed in part to a recent decision by the Scottish Football Association to ban summer football. Two cycle championships, over 1 mile and 25 miles, were also decided at the meet under the auspices of the Scottish Cyclists Union, which proved to be a popular draw.

Bernard Green from Aberdeen, though competing for the London Scottish, adopted the unusual crouch start, which was referred to at the time as the "American style," start. Up to this point, runners at all distances simply stood at the start line; with all parts of their body, including their head, behind the line. The crouch start originated with Charles Sherrill of Yale University, at the Rockaway Hunting Club Games, Cedarhurst, Long Island, on 12 May 1888. In 1891, it was still very uncommon even in the United States, and very rare anywhere else. Green may well have been the first person to perform it in Scotland.

In winning three events at the championship, Green equalled the record of James Greig (Cambridge Un.) who won three events at the 1889 championship. They both paired the 120 yard hurdles with the long jump, while Greig added the high jump and Green the 100 yards.

David Duncan (Edinburgh H.), a former pupil of the Royal High School in Edinburgh, and a former President and Honorary Secretary of the Scottish AAA, won the mile for the fifth time. He won the event at the first four championships in succession. On the other hand, the high jump event was declared void as none of the contenders for the competition appeared on the day.

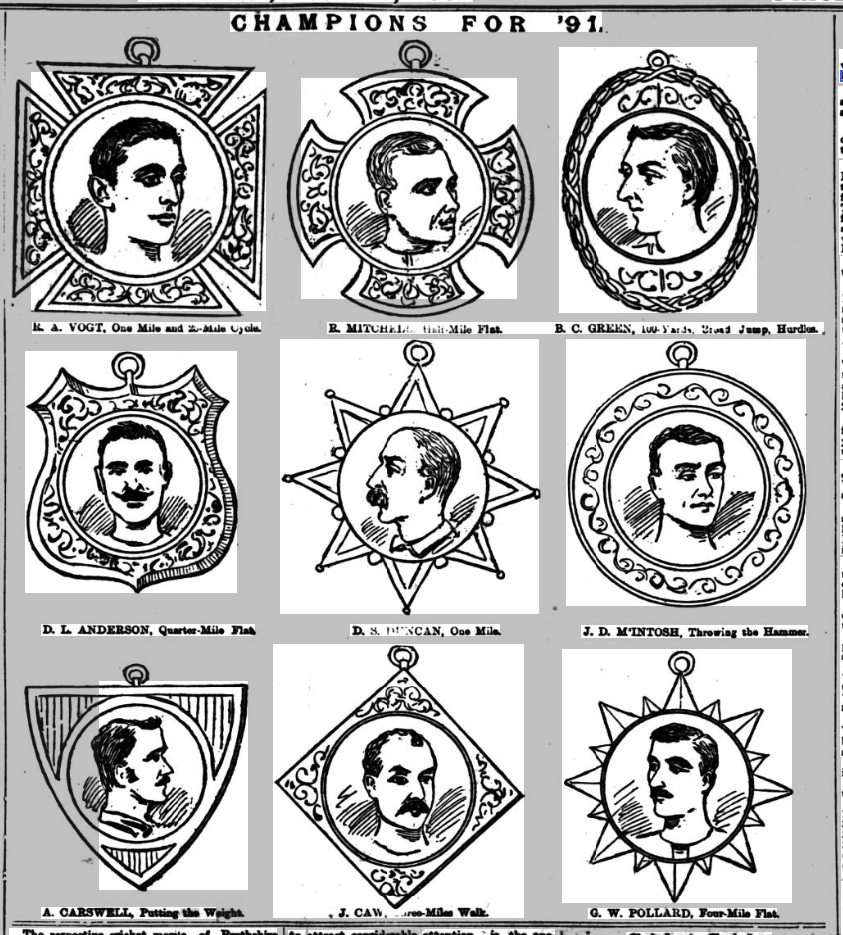
Portrait drawings of individual winners of Scottish athletics championship in 1891

== Results summary ==
100 yards
Pos	Athlete	Time
1.	Bernard C. Green (London Scottish School of Arms)	10 4/5
2.	Norman A. MacLeod (Glasgow Academicals)	2 feet
3.	Frederick R.B. Atkinson (Edinburgh Un.)	2 feet

440 yards
Pos	Athlete	Time
1.	D. L. Anderson (Edinburgh H.)	52 4/5
2.	Thomas Blair (Queen's Park FC)	
3.	Douglas R. McCullough (Helensburgh AC)	

880 yards
Pos	Athlete	Time
1.	Robert Mitchell (St Mirren FC)	2:03 3/5
2.	Walter Malcolm (Morton FC)	

1 mile
Pos	Athlete	Time
1.	David S. Duncan (Royal High School FP)	4:31 3/5
2.	James Rodger (Maybole FC)	

4 miles
Pos	Athlete	Time
1.	George W. Pollard (Edinburgh Un.)	21:43
2.	Alfred W. Forrest (Edinburgh H.)	

120 yard hurdles
Pos	Athlete	Time
1.	Bernard C. Green (London Scottish School of Arms)	16 4/5
2.	John R. Gow (Rangers FC)	
3.	Wellwood Lander (Edinburgh Un.)	

3 miles walk
Pos	Athlete	Time
1.	James Caw (Edinburgh H.);	25:20 4/5
2.	W. Miller (Clydesdale H.)	
3.	W. Wilson (Clydesdale H.)	

Long jump
Pos	Athlete	Dist
1.	Bernard C. Green (London Scottish School of Arms)	21 ft 0 1/2in (6.41m)
2.	G. A. Fothergill (Edinburgh Un.)	19 ft 3 1/2in (5.88m)
3.	A. Stevenson (Uddingston FC)	18 ft 1 1/2in (5.52m)

Shot put
Pos	Athlete	Dist
1.	Archibald Carswell (Lochgilphead Cricket & FC)	39 ft 2in (11.94m)
2.	James D. McIntosh (West End Amateur RC)	39 ft 1in (11.91m)
3.	Malcolm N. MacInnes (Edinburgh Un.)	36 ft 10in (11.22m)

Hammer
Pos	Athlete	Dist
1.	James D. MacIntosh (West End ARC)	92 ft 9in (28.28m)
2.	Malcolm N. MacInnes (Edinburgh Un.)	83 ft 0in (25.30m)
3.	Archibald Carswell (Lochgilphead Cricket & FC)	81 ft 4in (24.80m)

== 10 miles (track) ==
10 miles (track)
Pos	Athlete	Time
1.	Andrew Hannah (Clydesdale H.)	54:18 3/5
2.	William M. Carment (Edinburgh H.)	58:12 4/5

The 10-mile championship took place at Hampden Park, Glasgow on Thursday 2 April. The cinder path was in excellent order, but a bitterly cold north east wind made it unpleasant both for the runners and the 150 spectators. There were just three starters, including David Duncan, Honorary Secretary of the Scottish AAA, who stopped just before three miles, leaving Andrew Hannah clearly in the lead. William Carment was lapped, twice, while Hannah set Scottish All-comers records at every mile from 5 miles to the finish, and won by "fully 1200 yards." The 10 miles record stood for exactly three years, to the day, until Hannah himself broke it on 2 April 1894. splits (Field) 1 mile: 5:04.2, 10:29.6 (5:25.4), 15:52.0 (5:22.4), 21:14.4 (5:22.4), 26:35.6 (5:21.2), 32:11.4 (5:35.8), 37:41.8 (5:30.4), 43:13.6 (5:31.8), 48:48.2 (5:34.6), 54:18.6 (5:30.4).

== See also ==
- Scottish Athletics
- Scottish Athletics Championships
