= 1885 Scottish Athletics Championships =

Outdoor track and field competition

- Dates: 27 June
- Host city: Paisley, Scotland
- Venue: Westmarch Stadium
- Level: Senior
- Type: Outdoor
- Events: 11

The 1885 Scottish Athletics Championships were the third national athletics championships to be held in Scotland. They were held under the auspices of the Scottish Amateur Athletic Association at Westmarch Stadium, the home of St Mirren FC in Paisley, on Saturday 27 June 1885. The track was described as being in very good condition but the weather was extremely hot and fewer than one thousand spectators turned out to see David Duncan win the 1 mile for the third successive year. He was President of SAAA at the time and remains the only man to have won a Scottish national athletics championship whilst President of the organising body. Kenneth Whitton (St George's FC) set Scottish Native and All-comers records in winning the hammer. This was thrown Scots' style, using a wooden handled hammer from a nine-foot square, wire handled hammers and the circle were not adopted until 1896.

1885 is also a notable landmark in Scottish athletics. Up to this point athletes had represented football clubs, rugby, cricket or rowing clubs, or their schools and universities. In 1885 actual athletic clubs were first formed in Scotland, the first two being Clydesdale Harriers in the West, formed in May 1885, closely followed in September by Edinburgh Harriers in the East.

== Results summary ==
100 yards
Pos	Athlete	Time
1.	Robert A. Taylor (Edinburgh Un.)	10 3/5
2.	Maurice C. Wright (Edinburgh Un.)	1 foot
3.	Reginald H. Morrison (Edinburgh Un.)	1 foot

440 yards
Pos	Athlete	Time
1.	Simon Henderson (Watson's Coll. AC)	51 4/5
2.	Reginald H. Morrison (Edinburgh Un.)	1 yard
3.	Maurice C. Wright (Edinburgh Un.)	

880 yards
Pos	Athlete	Time
1.	James Logan (Vale of Leven FC)	2:03 3/5
2.	Reginald H. Morrison (Edinburgh Un.)	1 yard

1 mile
Pos	Athlete	Time
1.	David S. Duncan (Royal High School FP)	5:01 2/5
2.	James M. Crawford (Edinburgh Un.)	

120 yard hurdles
Pos	Athlete	Time
1.	Henry A. Watt (Glasgow Un.)	17 4/5

3 miles walk
Pos	Athlete	Time
1.	James Caw (St Georges FC)	24:54
2.	A. Brown (Airdrieonians FC)	50 yards

High jump
Pos	Athlete	Dist
1.	James N. Macleod (Glasgow Un.)	5 ft 8in (1.72m)
2.	John W. Parsons (Fettes-Loretto)	5 ft 6in (1.67m)
3.	R. G. Taylor (Edinburgh North of England AC)	5 ft 3in (1.60m)

Pole vault
Pos	Athlete	Dist
1.	Augustus G. G. Asher (Fettes-Loretto)	10 ft 1in (3.07m)
2.	George Hodgson (Edinburgh North of England AC)	9 ft 6in (2.89m)

Long jump
Pos	Athlete	Dist
1.	John W. Parsons (London AC)	21 ft 9 1/2in (6.64m)
2.	R. G. Taylor (Edinburgh North of England AC)	18 ft 6in (5.64m)

Shot put
Pos	Athlete	Dist
1.	Kenneth Whitton (Ross County FC)	41 ft 6in (12.65m)
2.	Charles Reid (Edinburgh Academicals)	38 ft 9in (11.81m)

Hammer
Pos	Athlete	Dist
1.	Kenneth Whitton (St George FC)	100 ft 5 3/4in (30.60m)
2.	Charles Reid (Edinburgh Academicals FC)	87 ft 8in (26.72m)

== See also ==
- Scottish Athletics
- Scottish Athletics Championships
