= 1887 Scottish Athletics Championships =

Outdoor track and field competition

- Dates: 25 June
- Host city: Glasgow, Scotland
- Venue: Hampden Park
- Level: Senior
- Type: Outdoor
- Events: 13

The 1887 Scottish Athletics Championships were the fifth national athletics championships to be held in Scotland. They were held under the auspices of the Scottish Amateur Athletic Association at Hampden Park, Glasgow, on Saturday 25 June 1887. Very hot weather was blamed for the low attendance of "probably not more than a thousand," but the Glasgow Police Sports held the same afternoon attracted a crowd of over 3,000 spectators. At Hampden Park, Ernest Latimer Stones (Partick Thistle FC) broke the Scottish record for the pole vault with his winning height of 11 feet (3.35m). Born at Ulverston in the English Lake District in 1865, he played football for Partick Thistle, tied with Tom Ray for the AAA pole vault title in 1888, and won it outright in 1889. At Southport in June 1888, he set a world record of 11 feet 7 inches (3.53m). He will eventually win the Scottish title three times, and his Scottish record for the event of 11 feet 4 inches (3.45m) will not be broken in Scotland until 1924, and not by a Scottish athlete until 1930. The half mile was won by John Braid (Stanley House Cricket Club) who competed in the Olympic Games in 1900, playing cricket, for France. Alex Findlay (Ayr FC) won the inaugural 4 miles championship on the Saturday, and in the 10 miles championship, held at the same venue on the following Monday, set a Scottish All-comers record for 9 miles en route to defending the title he had won last year, and was less than five seconds outside his own record for 10 miles. The prizes were presented by Mrs A. M. Hunter, the wife of the Hon. Sec. Scottish AAA, who would serve as President of the association in 1890.

== Results summary ==
100 yards
| Pos | Athlete | Time |
|---|---|---|
| 1. | Robert A. Taylor (Edinburgh Un.) | 10 3/5 |
| 2. | Charles J. F. Paisley (Royal High School FP) | 1 yard |
| 3. | James Adams (Australasian CC) | inches |

440 yards
| Pos | Athlete | Time |
|---|---|---|
| 1. | Charles J. F. Paisley (Royal High School FP) | 52 3/5 |
| 2. | Douglas R. McCulloch (Helensburgh AC) | |

880 yards
| Pos | Athlete | Time |
|---|---|---|
| 1. | John C. Braid (Stanley House CC) | 2:02 2/5 |
| 2. | Stephen G. Nobbs (Royal High School FP) | 2 yards |
| 3. | James Logan (Vale of Leven FC) | |

1 mile
| Pos | Athlete | Time |
|---|---|---|
| 1. | James Logan (Vale of Leven FC) | 4:35 3/5 |
| 2. | David S. Duncan (Edinburgh H.) | 3 yards |
| 3. | John J Smeaton (Stirling County CC) | |

4 miles
| Pos | Athlete | Time |
|---|---|---|
| 1. | Alex P. Findlay (Ayr FC) | 21:30 |
| 2. | William M. Thomson (Clydesdale H.) | |

120 yard hurdles
| Pos | Athlete | Time |
|---|---|---|
| 1. | Henry A. Watt (Glasgow Un.) | 17 4/5 |
| 2. | James T. Ward (Clydesdale H.) | 3 yards |
| 3. | C. C. McKnight (Australasian CC) | |

3 miles walk
| Pos | Athlete | Time |
|---|---|---|
| 1. | A. Brown (Plains FC) | 24:32 1/5 |
| 2. | James Caw (Edinburgh H.) | |

High jump
| Pos | Athlete | Dist |
|---|---|---|
| 1. | James N. MacLeod (Glasgow Un.) | 5 ft 7in (1.70m) |

Pole vault
| Pos | Athlete | Dist |
|---|---|---|
| 1. | Ernest Stones (Partick Thistle FC) | 11 ft 0in (3.35m) |
| 2. | C. C. MacKnight (Australasian CC) | 7 ft 0in (2.13m) |

Long jump
| Pos | Athlete | Dist |
|---|---|---|
| 1. | Arthur E. Bullock (Edinburgh Un.) | 21 ft 0in (6.40m) |

Shot put
| Pos | Athlete | Dist |
|---|---|---|
| 1. | Charles Reid (Edinburgh Academicals) | 40 ft 11in (12.47m) |
| 2. | J. MacDonald (Edinburgh H.) | 40 ft 4in (12.29m) |
| 3. | T. Robertson (Edinburgh H.) | 37 ft 2in (11.33m) |

Hammer
| Pos | Athlete | Dist |
|---|---|---|
| 1. | J. Barron (Edinburgh H.) | 94 ft 6in (28.80m) |
| 2. | Robert Smith (Mauchline FC) | 94 ft 1 1/2in (28.68m) |
| 3. | Charles Reid (Edinburgh Academicals FC) | 83 ft 2in (25.36m) |

== 10 miles (track) ==
10 miles (track)
| Pos | Athlete | Time |
|---|---|---|
| 1. | Alex P. Findlay (Ayr FC) | 55:21 3/5 |
| 2. | William Henderson (Clydesdale H.) | 56:02 4/5 |

The 10-mile championship took place at the same venue on Monday 27 June. As last year there were four starters, with Findlay taking the lead and W. Henderson (Clydesdale H.), W. M. Jack (Edinburgh H.) and J. McWilliam (Kilmarnock H.) in close attendance in that order for two miles, when Findlay increased the pace and gradually the others fell away. Both Jack and McWilliam retired in the sixth mile at which point Henderson was 200 yards in arrears. From there, Findlay just did enough to maintain the gap and won easily. splits (Leith Burghs Pilot) 1 mile: 5:19, 10:40 (5:21), 16:12 (5:32), 21:45 (5:33), 27:20 (5:35), 33:04 (5:44), 38:41 (5:37), 44:10 (5:29), 49:52 (5:42), 55:21.6 (5:29.6).

== See also ==
- Scottish Athletics
- Scottish Athletics Championships
