= 1888 Scottish Athletics Championships =

Outdoor track and field competition

- Dates: 23 June
- Host city: Edinburgh, Scotland
- Venue: Powderhall Grounds
- Level: Senior
- Type: Outdoor
- Events: 13

The 1888 Scottish Athletics Championships were the sixth national athletics championships to be held in Scotland. They were held under the auspices of the Scottish Amateur Athletic Association at Powderhall Grounds, Edinburgh, on Saturday 23 June 1888. The meet was held in "splendid" weather, and the track was reported to be "in first rate order," but a slight easterly wind affected performances. Ernest Stones (Ulverston AC) set a Scottish All-comers record in defending his pole vault title. Three days after finishing second in the 4 miles at the championship Andrew Hannah set a Scottish All-comers record at the event running 21:02 2/5 at Ibrox Park, Glasgow. This was the first in a long list of almost three dozen records Hannah will set over the next seven years at all distances from 2 miles to 10 miles, becoming the dominant Scottish distance runner of the decade. For the first time the 10 miles championship was held separately, being held at the Powderhall Grounds on Saturday 7 April, and with twice as many entrants as any previous year the experiment was continued in the future. It didn't, however, affect the result with Alex Findlay (Ayr FC) easily retaining his title shortly before emigrating to the United States. The chief judge at the championships, in his year as President of the association, was M. P. Fraser of Glasgow University AC.

== Results summary ==
100 yards
| Pos | Athlete | Time |
|---|---|---|
| 1. | James H. Allan (St George's FC) | 10 3/5 |
| 2. | Robert A. Taylor (Edinburgh Un.) | inches |
| 3. | James T. Ward (Clydesdale H.) | 1 yard |

440 yards
| Pos | Athlete | Time |
|---|---|---|
| 1. | Thomas Blair (Queen's Park FC) | 53 2/5 |
| 2. | James B. Green (Irvine Amateur FC) | 1 foot |
| 3. | Thomas Maley (Clydesdale H.) | |

880 yards
| Pos | Athlete | Time |
|---|---|---|
| 1. | A. M. Marshall (Dumbarton Athletic FC) | 2:02 3/5 |
| 2= | John Allan (Monkcastle FC) | 10 yards |
| 2= | John Blane (Clydesdale H.) | 10 yards |

1 mile
| Pos | Athlete | Time |
|---|---|---|
| 1. | John Blane (Clydesdale H.) | 4:35 2/5 |
| 2. | David S. Duncan (Edinburgh H.) | 20 yards |
| 3. | James Logan (Vale of Leven FC) | |

4 miles
| Pos | Athlete | Time |
|---|---|---|
| 1. | William M. Jack (Edinburgh H.) | 21:17 3/5 |
| 2. | Andrew Hannah (Clydesdale H.) | 50 yards |

120 yard hurdles
| Pos | Athlete | Time |
|---|---|---|
| 1. | Alex Vallance (Clydesdale H.) | 18 4/5 |
| 2. | James T. Ward (Clydesdale H) | 8 yards |
| 3. | G. D. Wilson (Edinburgh H.) | |

3 miles walk
| Pos | Athlete | Time |
|---|---|---|
| 1. | A. Brown (Clydesdale H.) | 24:26 2/5 |
| 2. | J. Urquhart (Edinburgh H.) | 20 yards |

High jump
| Pos | Athlete | Dist |
|---|---|---|
| 1. | George G. Robertson (Edinburgh H.) | 5ft 2 1/4in (1.58m) |
| 2. | James T. Ward (Clydesdale H.) | 5ft 1in (1.55m) |

Pole vault
| Pos | Athlete | Dist |
|---|---|---|
| 1. | Ernest Stones (Ulverston AC) | 11ft 2 1/2in (3.41m) |

Long jump
| Pos | Athlete | Dist |
|---|---|---|
| 1. | Arthur E. Bullock (Edinburgh Un.) | 21ft 0in (6.40m) |
| 2. | W. H. Campbell (Mauchline FC) | 19ft 4in (5.89m) |
| 3. | Alex Vallance (Clydesdale H.) | |

Shot put
| Pos | Athlete | Dist |
|---|---|---|
| 1. | J. MacDonald (Edinburgh H.) | 40ft 4in (12.29m) |
| 2. | T. Robertson (Edinburgh H.) | 38ft 4in (11.68m) |
| 3. | W. Mackenzie (Clydesdale H.) | 34ft 1in (10.39m) |

Hammer
| Pos | Athlete | Dist |
|---|---|---|
| 1. | T. Robertson (Edinburgh H.) | 90ft 8in (27.64m) |
| 2. | Robert Smith (Mauchline FC) | |

== 10 miles (track) ==
10 miles (track)
| Pos | Athlete | Time |
|---|---|---|
| 1. | Alex P. Findlay (Clydesdale H.) | 55:33 |
| 2. | David S. Duncan (Royal High School FP) | |
| 3. | Peter Addison (Edinburgh H.) | |

The 10-mile championship took place at the same venue on Saturday 7 April. There were eight entries and seven starters. A. Graham (Edinburgh H.) took the lead but before the first mile had been completed Findlay took over and was never headed. Duncan stopped at one point but was persuaded to carry on.

== See also ==
- Scottish Athletics
- Scottish Athletics Championships
