= 1895 Scottish Athletics Championships =

Outdoor track and field competition

- Dates: 22 June
- Host city: Glasgow, Scotland
- Venue: Ibrox Park
- Level: Senior
- Type: Outdoor
- Events: 12

The 1895 Scottish Athletics Championships were the thirteenth national athletics championships to be held in Scotland. They were held under the auspices of the Scottish Amateur Athletic Association at Ibrox Park, Glasgow, on Saturday 22 June 1895.

== Background ==
There had for a number of years been a disagreement in Scottish athletics over whether professional cycle racing events should be allowed at amateur athletics meetings. There were strong views both in favour and against the position, and arriving at a deadlock in their negotiations, in March 1895 several western district clubs in favour of allowing professional cycle events, led by Clydesdale Harriers, seceded from the Scottish AAA and formed the Scottish Amateur Athletics Union (SAAU). The consequence of this was that there were two national championships in both 1895 and 1896 held under the auspices of the two separate bodies. In 1895 they were both held on the same day in the same city, at the grounds of opposing football clubs, and if attendance is anything to go by the Scottish public made their feeling on the topic abundantly clear. Over 6,000 fans attended the breakaway SAAU championships at Hampden Park where Robert Langlands became the first Scottish athlete to break two minutes for 880 yards, whilst barely 1000 spectators saw Mrs McNab, the wife of the Hon. Secretary Scottish AAA, present the prizes at Ibrox Park.

In the Scottish AAA, Alfred Downer (Scottish Pelicans) repeated his remarkable triple win of the previous two years, winning the 100 yards, 220 yards, and 440 yards. Having won each event for three years in succession the trophies all became his personal property. In the 100 yards he ran 10 seconds, referred to at the time as "evens," and this was ratified as a Scottish Native and All-comers record. Later that year, in a match at Stoke-on-Trent with Charles Bradley, the English AAA champion, they tied the race with both men returning 9 4/5 to tie, with five other men, four Americans and a New Zealander, the world record for 100 yards. There was, however, only one timekeeper, so it could not be ratified. Downer's 10 seconds was the Scottish All-comers record until 1913, when it was beaten by the English sprinter William Applegarth. No other Scot ran 10 seconds until Eric Liddell in 1922, and no Scottish athlete officially ran faster than 10 seconds until 1935. His 9 4/5 was not equalled by a Scot until 1952 and not beaten until 1967.

John Ballantyne, the man who finished second behind Downer in both the 100 yards and 220 yards, was actually Downer's cousin, and was described as being, "his very image in appearance and style." The mile would have been a walk over had William Carment not graciously consented to make a race of it, but the winner's time reflects the impromptu nature of the contest.

With his winning throw of 43ft 1in (13.13m) James MacIntosh (West End ARC) set Scottish Native and All-comers records in the shot put. D. Ross' winning throw in the hammer was widely reported as being the world's amateur record, but that was not the case. It was, however, Scottish Native and All-comers records for the wooden-handled hammer. Wire handled hammers were not introduced into the championship until 1896.

== Results summary ==
100 yards
Pos	Athlete	Time
1.	Alfred R. Downer (Scottish Pelicans)	10sec.
2.	John K. Ballantyne (Scottish Pelicans)	3½ yards

220 yards
Pos	Athlete	Time
1.	Alfred R. Downer (Scottish Pelicans)	23 1/5
2.	John K. Ballantyne (Scottish Pelicans)	3 yards
3.	Hugh Barr (Edinburgh H.)	1/2 yard

440 yards
Pos	Athlete	Time
1.	Alfred R. Downer (Scottish Pelicans)	52 2/5
2.	R. A. Bruce (Scottish Pelicans)	20 yards
3.	Hector A. Mollison (Glasgow Un.)	

880 yards
Pos	Athlete	Time
1.	Miles C. Seton (Edinburgh Un.)	2:05 2/5
2.	John Stirton (Edinburgh H.)	2 yards
3.	Thomas B. H. Scott (Edinburgh Un.)	5 yards

1 mile
Pos	Athlete	Time
1.	John Stirton (Edinburgh H.)	4:46 4/5
2.	William M. Carment (Edinburgh H.)	50 yards

4 miles
Pos	Athlete	Time
1.	Jack Stewart (Newcastle H.)	21:01 3/5
2.	Patrick McMorrow (West of Scotland H.)	60 yards

120 yard hurdles
Pos	Athlete	Time
1.	Andrew L. Graham (1st Lanarkshire Rifle Volunteers)	17 3/5
2.	William C. S. Taylor (Queen's Park FC)	

High jump
Pos	Athlete	Time
1.	Charles Fenwick (Dundee Amateur Gymnastic Society)	5ft 9in (1.75m)
2=	Andrew L. Graham (1st Lanarkshire Rifle Volunteers)	5ft 6in (1.67m)
2=	William Grieve (Dundee Amateur Gymnastic Society)	5ft 6in (1.67m)

Long jump
Pos	Athlete	Dist
1.	Hugh Barr (Clydesdale H.)	21ft 0 1/2in (6.41m)
2.	Andrew L. Graham (1st Lanarkshire Rifle Volunteers)	20ft 4in (6.20m)
3.	William C. S. Taylor (Queen's Park FC)	20ft 1in (6.12m)

Shot put
Pos	Athlete	Dist
1.	James D. Macintosh (West End Amateur Rowing Club)	43ft 1in (13.13m)
2.	D. Ross (North of Scotland AA)	41ft 10in (12.75m)
3.	Malcolm N. MacInnes (Edinburgh Un.)	37ft 0in (11.28m)

Hammer
Pos	Athlete	Dist
1.	D. Ross (North of Scotland AA)	104ft 6in (31.86m)
2.	James D. Macintosh (West End Amateur Rowing Club)	100ft 1in (30.50m)
3.	Malcolm N. MacInnes (Edinburgh Un.)	99ft 10in (30.44m)

== 10 miles (track) ==
10 miles (track)
Pos	Athlete	Time
1.	Andrew Hannah (Clydesdale H.)	53:26.0
2.	William Robertson (Clydesdale H.)	54:07.0
3.	Alexander McCallum (Partick H.)	55:45 2/5

The 10-mile championship took place at Hampden Park, Glasgow on Friday 12 April 1895. The track was in perfect condition for this evening race, but only three men toed the line to challenge Andrew Hannah (Clydesdale H.) the holder of the title, who had just returned from Wexford in Ireland where he had raced 5 miles against James Mullen, the Irish champion, and by all accounts was ill and had performed badly, and was lapped before the end of the fourth mile. The championship field included Alex McCallum, the West of Scotland junior cross country champion in his first race over the distance. But the race turned into a procession and it quickly became clear that if Hannah had been ill, he was more than fully recovered. By three miles he was ten yards clear of the field and doubled that in the next mile. By five miles he was on his own, running free and relaxed he set Scottish Native and All-comers records at every mile from 5 miles to the finish and won by over 200 yards. Robertson and McCallum were the only other finishers and both qualified for a standard medal for beating 57 minutes. splits (Edinburgh Evening News) 1 mile: 5:02.6, 10:14.2 (5:11.6), 15:31.0 (5:16.8), 20:47.6 (5:16.6), 26:01.6 (5:14.0), 31:26.6 (5:25.0), 36:55.0 (5:28.4), 42:22.8 (5:27.8), 47:55.8 (5:33.0), 53:26.0 (5:30.2)

== Scottish (AAU) winners ==
Event winners
Event	Athlete	Time
100 yards	W. Wilson (Clyde FC)	10 4/5
220 yards	Douglas R. McCulloch (Helensburgh AC)	24 1/5
440 yards	James Rodger (Carrick H.)	54 2/5
880 yards	Robert Langlands (Clydesdale H.)	1:59 4/5
1 mile	William Robertson (Clydesdale H.)	4:28 2/5
4 miles	Andrew Hannah (Clydesdale H.)	21:08.0

== See also ==
- Scottish Athletics
- Scottish Athletics Championships
