= 1886 Scottish Athletics Championships =

Outdoor track and field competition

- Dates: 26 June
- Host city: Edinburgh, Scotland
- Venue: Powderhall Grounds
- Level: Senior
- Type: Outdoor
- Events: 11

The 1886 Scottish Athletics Championships were the fourth national athletics championships to be held in Scotland. They were held under the auspices of the Scottish Amateur Athletic Association at the Powderhall Grounds, Edinburgh on Saturday 26 June 1886. Although the weather was fine a strong west wind affected the attendance, and the Field commented that, "it is to be regretted that the followers of athletics will not accord their patronage to Powderhall, than which there is no finer inclosure in the kingdom." The wind also affected performances in many events and no records were set on the day. But in the ten miles track race on the following Monday Alexander Findlay (Ayr FC) rewrote the record book for distance running in Scotland. Colonel John Macdonald, the Lord Advocate, presented the prizes.

== Results summary ==
100 yards
Pos	Athlete	Time
1.	W. Rodger (Edinburgh H.)	11 sec.
2.	Maurice C. Wright (Edinburgh Un.)	inches
3.	Robert A. Taylor (Edinburgh Un.)	

440 yards
Pos	Athlete	Time
1.	Maurice C. Wright (Edinburgh Un.)	52 2/5
2.	Thomas Blair (Queen's Park FC)	4 yards
3.	T. G. Connell (Queen's Park FC)	

880 yards
Pos	Athlete	Time
1.	Simon Henderson (Watsons Coll. AC)	2:04 4/5
2.	James M. Crawford (Edinburgh Un.)	15 yards
3.	Stephen G. Nobbs (Royal High School FP)	

1 mile
Pos	Athlete	Time
1.	David S. Duncan (Royal High School FP)	4:40 4/5
2.	William M. Gabriel (Edinburgh Un.)	10 yards

120 yard hurdles
Pos	Athlete	Time
1.	Henry A. Watt (Glasgow Un.)	18 2.5
2.	Alex Vallance (Rangers FC)	inches
3.	James T. Ward (Clydesdale H.)	

3 miles walk
Pos	Athlete	Time
1.	James Caw (St Georges FC)	24:03 1/5
2.	A. Brown (Airdrieonians FC)	12 yards

High jump
Pos	Athlete	Dist
1.	John W. Parsons (Fettes-Loretto)	5 ft 11in (1.80m)
2.	James N. Macleod (Glasgow Un.)	5 ft 7 1/4in (1.71m)
3.	Augustus G. G. Asher (Fettes-Loretto)	5 ft 6 1/4in (1.68m)

Pole vault
Pos	Athlete	Dist
1.	Augustus G. G. Asher (Fettes-Loretto)	10 ft 3in (3.12m)
2.	George Hodgson (Edinburgh North of England AC)	9 ft 6in (2.89m)

Long jump
Pos	Athlete	Dist
1.	John W. Parsons (London AC)	21 ft 6in (6.55m)
2.	Augustus G. G. Asher (Fettes-Loretto)	20 ft 8in (6.30m)
3.	Arthur E. Bullock (Edinburgh Un.)	20 ft 2in (6.14m)

Shot put
Pos	Athlete	Dist
1.	Charles Reid (Edinburgh Academicals)	40 ft 0in (12.19m)
2.	T. Robertson (Edinburgh H.)	36 ft 10in (11.22m)
3.	Bartholomew Norval (Queen's Edinburgh Rifle Volunteers)	

Hammer
Pos	Athlete	Dist
1.	Charles Reid (Edinburgh Academicals FC)	92 ft 6in (28.20m)
2.	Bartholomew Norval (Queen's Edinburgh Rifle Volunteers)	85 ft 7in (26.08m)
3.	T. Robertson (Edinburgh H.)	

== 10 miles (track) ==
10 miles (track)
Pos	Athlete	Time
1.	Alex P. Findlay (Ayr FC)	55:16 4/5

The 10-mile championship took place at the same venue on Monday 28 June. There were four competitors at the start, but David Duncan (Edinburgh H.) stopped with a stitch at three and a half miles, W. M. Thompson (Clydesdale H.) stopped at four miles, and W. M. Gabriel (Edinburgh Un.) stopped before reaching half way. Alex Findlay of Ayr Football Club set Scottish All-comers records for 3 miles, 5 miles, and 6 miles, in this race, missing the 4 miles record by just three seconds. After Gabriel dropped out Findlay ran on alone and was doing well up to six miles, when he too took a stitch and struggled for the next two miles, but still set Scottish All-comers records for 7 miles, 8 miles, 9 miles and 10 miles. With the permission of the judge, Mr Asher, Duncan rejoined the race at 8 miles and accompanied Findlay over the last two miles. splits (Field) 1 mile: 5:09, 10:31 (5:22), 15:54 (5:23), 21:19 (5:25), 26:41 (5:22), 32:12 (5:31), 38:03 (5:51), 44:01 (5:58), 49:53 (5:52), 55:16.8 (5:23.8).

== See also ==
- Scottish Athletics
- Scottish Athletics Championships
