= 1892 Scottish Athletics Championships =

Outdoor track and field competition

- Dates: 25 June
- Host city: Dundee, Scotland
- Venue: Carolina Port
- Level: Senior
- Type: Outdoor
- Events: 13

The 1892 Scottish Athletics Championships were the tenth national athletics championships to be held in Scotland. They were held under the auspices of the Scottish Amateur Athletic Association at Carolina Port, Dundee, on Saturday 25 June 1892. The prizes were presented by Stewart Lawrie, President of the association.

== Background ==
The stadium in Dundee had been purpose-built for athletics and cycling by the Dundee Athletic Company and was the first sports arena in Scotland to be built and operated by a publicly owned company. But only a few hundred spectators showed up to watch and this was the last time the national championship was held outside of either Edinburgh or Glasgow until 1967. It started to rain around two hours before the first race and continued throughout the meet, "without intermission," leaving the competitors at a distinct disadvantage and as a consequence the general standard of performance was not as high as might have been expected and no records were broken.

The 220 yards was held for the first time and Norman MacLeod (Glasgow Academicals), who had twice finished second in the 100 yards, made no mistake at the longer distance. Robert Mitchell (St Mirren FC) won the 880 yards for the fourth consecutive year. Charles Pennycook, the national cross country champion, narrowly failed to win a title in his home town but local boy James MacIntosh (West End Rowing Club) won both the shot put and hammer.

== Results summary ==
100 yards
Pos	Athlete	Time
1.	Douglas R. McCulloch (Helensburgh AC)	10 3/5
2.	Norman A. MacLeod (Glasgow Academicals)	1/2 yard
3.	Frederick R. B. Atkinson (Edinburgh Un.)	

220 yards
Pos	Athlete	Time
1.	Norman A. MacLeod (Glasgow Academicals)	23 3/5
2.	Douglas R. McCulloch (Helensburgh AC)	2 yards

440 yards
Pos	Athlete	Time
1.	Douglas R. McCulloch (Helensburgh AC)	54sec.

880 yards
Pos	Athlete	Time
1.	Robert Mitchell (St Mirren FC)	2:05 4/5
2.	Walter Malcolm (Morton FC)	1/2 yard
3.	Duncan F. Dempster (Cambridge Un. AC)	

1 mile
Pos	Athlete	Time
1.	Henry A. Munro (London AC)	4:37
2.	Charles Pennycook (Clydesdale H.)	20 yards
3.	Samuel B. Figgis (Edinburgh Un.)	20 yards

4 miles
Pos	Athlete	Time
1.	George W. Pollard (Edinburgh Un.)	21:01 3/5
2.	Henry A. Munro (London AC)	10 yards
3.	William J. Lowson (Dundee H.)	25 yards

120 yard hurdles
Pos	Athlete	Time
1.	Norman A. MacLeod (Glasgow Academicals)	17sec.
2.	Thomas M. Donovan (IRL) (Edinburgh Un.)	
3.	Reginald Williams (Edinburgh Un.)	inches

3 miles walk
Pos	Athlete	Time
1.	J. Dickison (Edinburgh H.)	24:27

High jump
Pos	Athlete	Time
1.	Reginald Williams (Edinburgh Un.)	5 ft 6 3/4in (1.69m)
2.	John L. Williams (Aberdeen Gymnastic & RC)	5 ft 5 1/4in (1.65m)

Long jump
Pos	Athlete	Dist
1.	Andrew L. Graham (1st Lanarkshire Rifle Volunteers)	20 ft 8in (6.30m)
2.	Thomas M. Donovan (IRL) (Edinburgh Un.)	19 ft 10 1/2in (6.06m)
3.	Reginald Williams (Edinburgh Un.)	19 ft 3in (5.87m)

Shot put
Pos	Athlete	Dist
1.	James D. MacIntosh (West End ARC)	40 ft 9 1/2in (12.43m)
2.	Malcolm N. MacInnes (Edinburgh Un.)	40 ft 0in (12.19m)
3.	R. S. Reid (Carse o' Gowrie)	

Hammer
Pos	Athlete	Dist
1.	James D. MacIntosh (West End ARC)	98 ft 0in (29.88m)
2.	Malcolm N. MacInnes (Edinburgh Un.)	96 ft 1 in (29.28m)
3.	Kenneth Whitton (Edinburgh H.)	92 ft 5in (28.18m)

== 10 miles (track) ==
10 miles (track)
Pos	Athlete	Time
1.	Peter Addison (Edinburgh H.)	56:06 2/5
2.	Thomas I. S. Hunter (Edinburgh H.)	56:16 1/5
3.	Patrick McMorrow (West of Scotland H.)	

The 10-mile championship took place at the Powderhall Grounds, Edinburgh, on Thursday 24 March in front of 200 spectators. The weather was fine but there was a noticeable breeze in the home straight. Andrew Hannah, the holder of the title, had entered to defend his title but his younger brother died shortly before the race and he withdrew. Charles Pennycook (Clydesdale H.), who had won the Scottish cross country championships just ten days prior, missed his train, and this left just seven men to start the race with Patrick McMorrow (West of Scotland H.) against six men from Edinburgh Harriers. Of the starters, Thomas Hunter was thought to be the favourite, largely on account of his proven abilities in a final sprint. By four miles the race had become a match race between two men, with Hunter, a young man with a lot of potential, leading from Peter Addison, described as, "one of the oldest runners on the Scottish track." There was barely a yard between them as one by one the other competitors fell away, but the pace was not fast and it became clear that both men were basing their chances on a final sprint. At eight and three-quarter miles they lapped Patrick McMorrow, the only other runner still in the race, and whatever happened now it would be the closest contested race in the series. As the bell rang to announce the start of the final lap they were still a yard apart, Hunter in front, as he had been for the previous five miles. With 300 yards to go Addison "shot clean away" and quickly established a very popular winning lead of forty yards. McMorrow finished approximately 500 yards behind Hunter. The time was the slowest by a winner of the championship so far. splits (Field) 1 mile: 5:11.6, 10:37.6 (5:26.0), 16:03.2 (5:25.6), 21:34.0 (5:30.8), 27:11.2 (5:37.2), 32:46.0 (5:34.8), 38:43.6 (5:57.6), 44:28.2 (5:44.6), 50:20.6 (5:52.4), 56:06.4 (5:45.8).

== See also ==
- Scottish Athletics
- Scottish Athletics Championships
