= 1896 Scottish Athletics Championships =

Outdoor track and field competition

- Dates: 27 June
- Host city: Edinburgh, Scotland
- Venue: Powderhall Grounds
- Level: Senior
- Type: Outdoor
- Events: 12

The 1896 Scottish Athletics Championships were the fourteenth national athletics championships to be held in Scotland. They were held under the auspices of the Scottish Amateur Athletic Association at the Powderhall Grounds, Edinburgh, on Saturday 27 June 1896. The prizes were presented by Mrs. J. H. A. Laing, the wife of Dr. Laing of Edinburgh University, who had been President of the Association in 1894.

== Background ==
There had for a number of years been a disagreement in Scottish athletics over whether professional cycle racing events should be allowed at amateur athletics meetings. There were strong views both in favour and against the position, and arriving at a deadlock in their negotiations, in March 1895 several western district clubs in favour of allowing professional cycle events, led by Clydesdale Harriers, seceded from the Scottish AAA and formed the Scottish Amateur Athletics Union (SAAU). The consequence of this was that there were two national championships in both 1895 and 1896 held under the auspices of the two separate bodies. In 1896 they were both held on the same day in different cities. The Scottish AAA adhered to their policy of holding the championship alternately in the East and West of the country, and this year they were in Edinburgh, while the breakaway Scottish AAU held their championship at Hampden Park Glasgow, as they had done last year.

The weather was fine and dry, but there was a westerly breeze that made it uncomfortable for both competitors and the approximately 2000 spectators alike, so record performances were unlikely in the track races.

Hugh Barr (Edinburgh H.), did, however, set a Scottish Native record in winning the long jump, his leap of 22ft 1in (6.73m) beating a record set by Tom Vallance (Rangers FC) as long ago as 1881. Barr would improve on his own record in 1899, becoming the first Scottish jumper over 23 feet (7.01m) and remained the record holder until 1914.

James MacIntosh (West End ARC), also set a Scottish Native record in winning his event, the shot put. His throw of 43ft 3in (13.18m) beat his own record set at this championship last year and will remain the Scottish record until 1903.

== Results summary ==
100 yards
Pos	Athlete	Time
1.	John K. Ballantyne (Scottish Pelicans)	10 4/5
2.	Hugh Barr (Clydesdale H.)	
3.	Thomas Scott (Edinburgh Un.)	

220 yards
Pos	Athlete	Time
1.	John K. Ballantyne (Scottish Pelicans)	23 3/5
2.	Hugh Barr (Clydesdale H.)	
3.	Thomas Scott (Edinburgh Un.)	

440 yards
Pos	Athlete	Time
1.	G. Catton Thomson (Edinburgh H.)	53sec.
2.	W. Pollock (Scottish Pelicans)	
3.	G. T. Somerville (Edinburgh Pharmacy)	

880 yards
Pos	Athlete	Time
1.	Hugh Welsh (Watson's Coll. AC)	2:04
2.	W. Hay (Edinburgh H.)	
3.	Thomas K. Fair (Edinburgh H.)	

1 mile
Pos	Athlete	Time
1.	Hugh Welsh (Watson's Coll. AC)	4:32
2.	John Stirton (Edinburgh H.)	
3.	J. F. Henry (Edinburgh H.)	

4 miles
Pos	Athlete	Time
1.	Robert A. Hay (Edinburgh H.)	20:57
2.	Alexander R. Gibb (Watson's Coll. AC)	

120 yard hurdles
Pos	Athlete	Time
1.	Alec B. Timms (Edinburgh Un.)	
2.	William Dove (Edinburgh Academy)	
3.	William C. S. Taylor (Queen's Park FC)	

High jump
Pos	Athlete	Time
1.	Charles Fenwick (Dundee Gymnastic & AC)	5ft 8in (1.72m)
2.	William Grieve (Dundee Gymnastic & AC)	5ft 6in (1.67m)
3.	William Dove (Edinburgh Academy)	5ft 4in (1.62m)

Long jump
Pos	Athlete	Dist
1.	Hugh Barr (Edinburgh H.)	22ft 1in (6.73m)
2.	William C. S. Taylor (Queen's Park FC)	21ft 2in (6.45m)

Shot put
Pos	Athlete	Dist
1.	James D. Macintosh (West End Amateur Rowing Club)	43ft 3in (13.18m)
2.	Malcolm N. MacInnes (Edinburgh Un.)	41ft 7in (12.67m)

Hammer
Pos	Athlete	Dist
1.	James D. Macintosh (West End Amateur Rowing Club)	103ft 0in (31.40m)

== 10 miles (track) ==
10 miles (track)
Pos	Athlete	Time
1.	Robert A. Hay (Edinburgh H.)	55:56 3/5
2.	William J. Lowson (Dundee Hawkhill)	56:59
3.	Peter Addisson (Edinburgh Northern H.)	57:27

The 10-mile championship took place at the Powderhall Grounds, Edinburgh, on Saturday 4 April 1896. Jock Dalziel, the starter, got the six men away just before six o'clock. Just before the start the weather broke and the runners had to contend with a blustering westerly breeze and persistent rain throughout the race. P. McMorrow (West of Scotland H.) led for the first two miles at a "somewhat leisurely" pace. For the next two miles Robert Hay (Edinburgh H.), the cross country champion in 1895, and William Lowson (Dundee Hawkhill) alternately contested the lead with McMorrow and the pace gradually quickened as they tussled for ascendancy. At that point they were joined by A. R. Gibb (Watson's Coll.) and the race developed into a tough battle and an exciting finish appeared to be beckoning, but at seven miles Gibbs stopped, and at eight miles McMorrow joined him on the sidelines. At that moment Hay speeded up and left Lowson struggling to fend off Peter Addisson (Edinburgh Northern H.), the 1891 10 miles champion, who had bided his time and run a very conservative race throughout. Louis Jack (Watson's Coll.), the only other runner, did not finish.

== Scottish (AAU) winners ==
The championships took place at Hampden Park, Glasgow, on Saturday 27 June, while the 10 miles was held at the same venue on Friday 10 April. In both 1895 and 1896 William Robertson beat the existing Championship Best Performance for 1 mile of 4:29 4/5 set by Charles Pennycook in 1889, with his 1896 performance being a Scottish Native record. Whether either of these counted as championship bests or not was an open question but Hugh Welsh (Watson's Coll. AC) settled the matter in 1897 with 4:24 1/5.

Event winners
Event	Athlete	Time/Dist
100 yards	William Maley (Celtic FC)	11sec.
220 yards	James B Auld (Ayr FC)	23 2/5
440 yards	James Rodger (Carrick H.)	55 1/5
880 yards	John Barclay (West of Scotland H.)	2:03 4/5
1 mile	William Robertson (Clydesdale H.)	4:27.2
4 miles	Stewart Duffus (Clydesdale H.)	20:10 4/5
10 miles	Andrew Hannah (Clydesdale H.)	54:56 4/5
120ydH	John Cameron (Abercorn FC)	18 3/5
high jump	J. Macfarlane (Maryhill H.)	5ft 5 3/8in (1.65m)
long jump	G. M. Caldwell (Ayr FC)	18ft 4in (5.59m)
shot put	D. Ross (Lovat Shinty Club)	41ft 5in (12.62m)
hammer	D. Ross (Lovat Shinty Club)	102ft 8in (31.30m)

== See also ==
- Scottish Athletics
- Scottish Athletics Championships
