= 1890 Scottish Athletics Championships =

Outdoor track and field competition

- Dates: 21 June
- Host city: Edinburgh, Scotland
- Venue: Powderhall Grounds
- Level: Senior
- Type: Outdoor
- Events: 12

The 1890 Scottish Athletics Championships were the eighth national athletics championships to be held in Scotland. They were held under the auspices of the Scottish Amateur Athletic Association at Powderhall Grounds, Edinburgh, on Saturday 21 June 1890. The prizes were presented by A. M. Hunter, President of the association.

== Background ==
Last year they tried adding cycle races to make the meet more attractive, and this year they lowered the admission charge to sixpence per person, but despite it being, "a lovely day," the attendance did not exceed 400. A little rain earlier in the week left the cinder track in first class condition but a strong westerly wind affected performances on the day.

The only record set was in the hammer, where Kenneth Whitton, originally from Dingwall but representing Edinburgh Harriers, added more than two and a half feet (0.76 m) to his own mark and established a Scottish Native record of 103 ft 0 in (31.39 m) that stood for five years. Whitton was, at this point, the only Scottish amateur over 100 feet. This is with the Scots style hammer with a solid wooden handle, wire handles were not introduced until 1896. After serving as President of the association in 1903 Whitton will in 1933 co-author their Jubilee history, An Historical Record of the Scottish Amateur Athletic Association (1883-1933).

Robert Mitchell (St Mirren FC) the winner of the half-mile, who will eventually win this title five times in all, set a Scottish All-comers record of 2:00 2/5 at the St Mirren FC Sports on 19 July, the closest approach in Scotland to half a mile in two minutes for seven years. It would be another five years before a Scottish athlete knocked that 2/5 second off the time, but it was Mitchell who showed them that two minutes was possible. The mile went to David MacMichael (Edinburgh H.), better known as a cross country runner he out sprinted John Blane and David Hannah, the Scottish Record-holder over 2 miles, in a slow run race, with Hannah retiring in the home straight. But later in the afternoon Hannah reversed their positions in the 4 miles.

== Results summary ==
100 yards
Pos	Athlete	Time
1.	Norman A. MacLeod (Glasgow Academicals)	11 sec.
2.	Thomas Blair (Queen's Park FC)	1 1/2 yards
3.	Thomas Maley (Celtic FC)	1/2 yard

440 yards
Pos	Athlete	Time
1.	Thomas Blair (Queen's Park FC)	52 4/5
2.	D. L. Anderson (Edinburgh H.)	

880 yards
Pos	Athlete	Time
1.	Robert Mitchell (St Mirren FC)	2:03 1/5
2.	John Blane (Clydesdale H.)	5 yards

1 mile
Pos	Athlete	Time
1.	David C. MacMichael (Edinburgh H.)	4:40 1/5
2.	John Blane (Clydesdale H.)	6 yards

4 miles
Pos	Athlete	Time
1.	Andrew Hannah (Clydesdale H.)	21:03
2.	David C. MacMichael (Edinburgh Un.)	330 yards
3.	Thomas Hunter (Edinburgh H.)	

120 yard hurdles
Pos	Athlete	Time
1.	Reginald Williams (Edinburgh Un.)	18 2/5
2.	Wellwood Lander (Edinburgh Un.)	
3.	John R. Gow (Rangers FC)	

3 miles walk
Pos	Athlete	Time
1.	J. Urquhart (Edinburgh H.)	24:49 2/5
2.	A. Ramsay (Clydesdale H.)	438 yards

High jump
Pos	Athlete	Dist
1.	Reginald Williams (Edinburgh Un.)	5 ft 5 in (1.65 m)

Long jump
Pos	Athlete	Dist
1.	G. Munro (Edinburgh Institution)	19 ft 10 in (6.05 m)
2.	Reginald Williams (Edinburgh Un.)	19 ft 0 in (5.79 m)
3.	F. D. Cameron (Stewart's Coll. AC)	17 ft 6 1/2 in (5.347 m)

Shot put
Pos	Athlete	Dist
1.	J. McDonald (Edinburgh H.)	39 ft 1 in (11.91 m)
2.	Kenneth Whitton (Edinburgh H.)	38 ft 5 in (11.71 m)
3.	Malcolm N. MacInnes (Edinburgh Un.)	35 ft 5 in (10.80 m)

Hammer
Pos	Athlete	Dist
1.	Kenneth Whitton (Edinburgh H.)	103 ft 0 in (31.39 m)
2.	Malcolm N. MacInnes (Edinburgh Un.)	83 ft 11 in (25.58 m)

== 10 miles (track) ==
10 miles (track)
Pos	Athlete	Time
1.	Andrew Hannah (Clydesdale H.)	55:39 3/5
2.	Thomas Hunter (Edinburgh H.)	57:39 4/5

The 10-mile championship took place at Powderhall Grounds, Edinburgh on Friday 9 April. The crowd was so small that one journalist had time to count that there were only seventeen spectators, including the three officials. For the race itself there were seven entries but just six men toed the line, and they came from just two clubs; Andrew Hannah from Clydesdale Harriers in the west, while Thomas Hunter, David Duncan, J. S. Morrison, D. I. Mackinlay, and William Carment were all Edinburgh Harriers. From the start Hannah took the lead, with Duncan and Mackinlay in close attendance gradually drawing away from the other three men. Duncan retired after one and a half miles, Morrison did the same at three and a half miles, and just before four miles when Hunter overtook him, Mackinlay also retired. Carment stopped at half way, leaving just two men in the race. At this point Hannah had a lead of 150 yards over Hunter, and for two miles this did not change, but Hannah started to slow down, the sixth mile taking almost six minutes, and Hunter began to close the distance. But then Hunter started to experience some problems with his shoes and at eight miles he stopped to remove one of them and Hannah, sensing his chance, resumed his former running and actually lapped Hunter a mile from home and won by 600 yards. splits (Field) 1 mile: 5:06.2, 10:32.6 (5:26.4), 16:03.0 (5:30.4), 21:40.2 (5:37.2), 27:12.0 (5:31.8), 33:06.2 (5:54.2), 38:52.6 (5:46.4), 44:34.0 (5:41.4), 50:12.4 (5:38.4), 55:39.6 (5:27.2).

== See also ==
- Scottish Athletics
- Scottish Athletics Championships
