= 1900 Scottish Athletics Championships =

Outdoor track and field competition

- Dates: 23 June
- Host city: Edinburgh, Scotland
- Venue: Powderhall Grounds
- Level: Senior
- Type: Outdoor
- Events: 11

The 1900 Scottish Athletics Championships were the eighteenth national athletics championships to be held in Scotland. They were held under the auspices of the Scottish Amateur Athletic Association at the Powderhall Grounds, Edinburgh, on Saturday 23 June 1900, in brilliant sunshine.

== Background ==
Hugh Barr was a versatile athlete. He was a classmate of Alfred Downer at the Edinburgh Institution and at their sports in 1890 he won every event except the mile. He won the Scottish AAA 100 yards in 1898, won both the 100 yards and 220 yards at the international against Ireland in 1897, and won the Scottish AAA long jump title seven times, including six consecutive wins from 1895 - 1900. In 1896 he broke the Scottish long jump record that had stood since 1881, broke his own record in 1899 and that stood until 1914. His most outstanding single performance was in the long jump at the international against Ireland at Powderhall in 1899 where the Irish giant, six feet five inches tall Walter Newburn, who had set the world record for the event at this meet in 1898, was backed up by Peter O'Connor of Waterford who jumped one inch short of 23 feet (7.01m), but Hugh Barr out-jumped them both with his final leap to win the event and the match for Scotland. A cooper by trade, he lived and worked in Edinburgh all his life and died at home there on 1 May 1955 aged 81 years. His record of seven wins in the long jump has never been equalled.

William Welsh (4 Sep 1879) brought back memories of Alfred Downer's triple-triple in 1893-5 by winning the 100 yards, 220 yards and 440 yards championships with ease. An outstanding athlete at Merchiston Castle School in Edinburgh where he won four events in 1898, he won the 440 yards at the Scottish inter-university sports at Aberdeen in 1899 and one week later added the Scottish quarter-mile title to his collection. In July he went to London for the AAA Championships and confirmed his status as the best quarter-miler in Britain that year by finishing a close third to two outstanding Americans. Welsh also gained international honours at rugby, and in 1938 became President of the Scottish Rugby Union. Cousin to the equally successful miler Hugh Welsh, Willie was for many years a doctor with a practice in Bridge of Allan, Stirlingshire, where he died aged 94 on 2 July 1972.

Jack Paterson (Watson's Coll.) went one further by winning four championships in 1900. Having won the 7 miles cross country championship in March, he annexed the 10 miles title in April and took both the 880 yards and 1 mile titles at the championship without being pressed in either event and won from the front just as he pleased. He had already won the 4 miles title three times in 1897–99, and in June 1900 broke the Scottish Native record for the half mile. But he had only one more season of athletics before retiring on a high note by winning the mile at the international against Ireland. He was also a noted golfer, defeating E. M. Byers the United States Amateur Champion in the first round of the British Amateur Championship in 1907. He died aged 77 in Glasgow on 16 August 1950.

== Results summary ==
100 yards
Pos	Athlete	Time
1.	William Welsh (Edinburgh Un.)	10 3/5
2.	James McLean (Blackheath H.)	
3.	Robert Watson (Longport H.)	

220 yards
Pos	Athlete	Time
1.	William Welsh (Edinburgh Un.)	23sec.
2.	James McLean (Blackheath H.)	
3.	Robert Watson (Longport H.)	

440 yards
Pos	Athlete	Time
1.	William Welsh (Edinburgh Un.)	51 3/5
2.	Robert Watson (Longport H.)	
3.	Ralph Halkett (Finchley H.)	

880 yards
Pos	Athlete	Time
1.	Jack Paterson (Watson's Coll.)	1:59 3/5
2.	Robert Hay (Edinburgh H.)	
3.	Clement Paton (Edinburgh H.)	

1 mile
Pos	Athlete	Time
1.	Jack Paterson (Watson's Coll.)	4:37 2/5
2.	James Macdonald (Stewart's Coll.)	
3.	Gavin Stevenson (West of Scotland H.)	

4 miles
Pos	Athlete	Time
1.	Alexander Gibb (Watson's Coll.)	20:51
2.	David Mill (Clydesdale H.)	
3.	John Ranken (Watson's Coll.)	

120 yard hurdles
Pos	Athlete	Time
1.	Robert Stronach (Glasgow Academicals)	16 4/5
2.	George Anderson (Edinburgh Un.)	
3.	Alec Timms (Edinburgh Un.)	

High jump
Pos	Athlete	Dist
1.	John B. Milne (Dundee Gymnastic & AC)	5 ft 10in (1.78m)
2.	R. G. Murray (Clydesdale H.)	5 ft 8in (1.72m)

Long jump
Pos	Athlete	Dist
1.	Hugh Barr (Clydesdale H.)	21 ft 10in (6.65m)
2.	George Anderson (Edinburgh Un.)	20 ft 8in (6.30m)
3.	William Taylor (Queen's Park FC)	20 ft 6in (6.25m)

Shot put
Pos	Athlete	Dist
1.	Duncan Macrae (Aberdeen Un.)	38 ft 10in (11.83m)
2.	Malcolm MacInnes (Edinburgh Un.)	38 ft 7 1/2in (11.77m)
3.	D. Simpson (Dundee Gymnastic & AC)	33 ft 2 1/2in (10.12m)

Hammer
Pos	Athlete	Dist
1.	Malcolm MacInnes (Edinburgh Un.)	108 ft 10in (33.18m)
2.	Duncan Macrae (Aberdeen Un.)	106 ft 4in (32.42m)
3.	William Ogilvie (Ross & Cromarty AA)	100 ft 3in (30.56m)

== 10 miles (track) ==
10 miles (track)
Pos	Athlete	Time
1.	Jack Paterson (Watson's Coll.)	57:32 1/5
2.	David Mill (Clydesdale H.)	4 yds
3.	John McCaffrey (West of Scotland H.)	1 ft

The 10-mile championship took place at the Powderhall Grounds, Edinburgh, on Friday 6 April 1900. There were nine entries and eight starters, the most in the history of the event so far, and this resulted in a close race that was only decided within five yards of the finish. Jack Paterson (Watson's Coll.), the reigning Scottish cross country champion had finished third in a handicap mile on the Tuesday behind men with almost one hundred yards start, suggesting that he was in form and the man to beat. But William Badenoch (Edinburgh H.), the holder was defending his title. The eight men ran closed up in a group for the first nine miles with no real changes except that T. C. Hughes (Edinburgh H.) dropped out after five laps and William Laing (Edinburgh H.) stopped after eight and a half miles. By this point C. D. Paton was dropping off the back of the group and at nine miles Paterson "clapped on steam," and started to make a race of it. He was followed by David Mill (Clydesdale H.), John McCaffrey (West of Scotland H.), and A. Forrester, who gradually pulled away from Badenoch who was no longer in contention. With three laps to go they were in a tight group as they lapped Paton. With one lap to go they were still together, Paterson slightly ahead and only in the last few yards did Paterson draw definitely away to win by four yards with David Mill a bare half yard in front of McCaffrey. Forrester was fourth, with Badenoch 100 yards further away and Paton continued to become the first man to finish sixth in the championship. splits (Scottish Referee) 1 mile: 5:32, 11:06.2 (5:34.2), 16:48.2 (5:42), 22:40.6 (5:52.4), 28:36.4 (5:55.8), 34:33.2 (5:56.8), 40:29.0 (5:55.8), 46:29.0 (6:00), 52:25.0 (5:56), 57:32.2 (5:07.2).

== See also ==
- Scottish Athletics
- Scottish Athletics Championships
