= Ian Young =

Ian Young may refer to:

- Ian Young (academic) (born 1957), Australian academic
- Ian Young (athlete) (1911–2003), Scottish athlete
- Ian Young (basketball) (born 1981), Trinidadian basketball player
- Ian Young (footballer) (1943–2019), Scottish footballer
- Ian Young (marathoner), British marathon runner
- Ian Young (writer) (born 1945), Canadian author and poet
- Ian A. Young, Australian-born electronic engineer at Intel
- Ian Robert Young (1932–2019), British medical imaging researcher and inventor
- Ian Young (cricketer), captain of Scottish under-19 team 2004
