= 1899 Scottish Athletics Championships =

Outdoor track and field competition

- Dates: 24 June
- Host city: Glasgow, Scotland
- Venue: Hampden Park
- Level: Senior
- Type: Outdoor
- Events: 11

The 1899 Scottish Athletics Championships were the seventeenth national athletics championships to be held in Scotland. They were held under the auspices of the Scottish Amateur Athletic Association at Hampden Park, Glasgow, on Saturday 24 June 1898.

== Background ==
For the first time in a number of years there were no bicycle races alongside the athletic events due to a rift between the Scottish AAA and the Scottish Cyclists Union that was essentially the same disagreement they had in 1895-6 concerning payments made to professional cyclists competing at an otherwise amateur meet. This did not affect the athletics but it did make it less attractive as a public spectacle and there were very low numbers of spectators compared with previous years.

The highlight of the meet was the sight of an eighteen-year-old Edinburgh schoolboy winning two events. William Edwin Callender (4 Apr 1881) won both the 100 yards and 220 yards events into a stiff and gusty breeze beating his more experienced opposition by two and three yards respectively. The promise of another Downer seemed to be fulfilled at the Scotland vs Ireland international in July when he won the 220 yards, but sadly before the year was out he had died of injuries sustained on the rugby field.

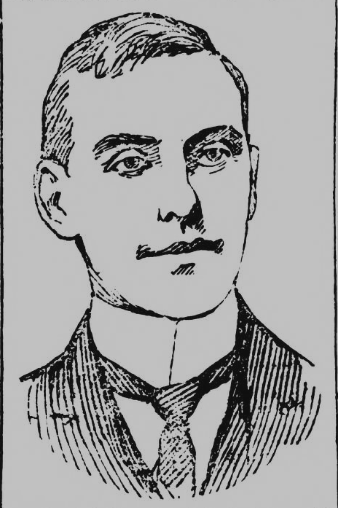
William E. Callender, of Watson's College, Edinburgh, Scottish 100 yards and 220 yards champion in 1899.

Hugh Welsh set a Scottish native record for the 880 yards in June, then won both the half-mile and mile at the championships as he had done in 1896 and 1897, won the mile at the AAA championships in Wolverhampton and won both the 880 yards and the mile at the international against Ireland in July. His cousin, William Welsh, a first-year medical student at Edinburgh University, had won the inter-University 440 yards the previous week, won the championship quarter going away and won the same event at the international in July.

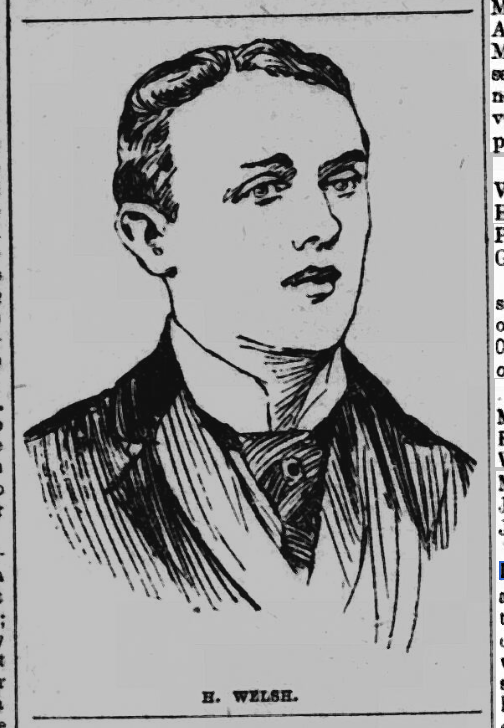
Hugh Welsh (20 Sep 1876) won Scottish AAA half-mile and 1 mile in 1896, 97, 99, and in 1898 and 1899 won both the half-mile and mile in the international against Ireland.

== Results summary ==
100 yards
Pos	Athlete	Time
1.	William E. Callender (Watson's College AC)	11sec.
2.	James B. Auld (Ayr FC)	

220 yards
Pos	Athlete	Time
1.	William E. Callender (Watson's College AC)	24sec.
2.	James B. Auld (Ayr FC)	
3.	J. Jeffrey (Glasgow Un.)	

440 yards
Pos	Athlete	Time
1.	William H. Welsh (Edinburgh Un.)	52 1/4
2.	Ralph Halkett (Finchley AC)	
3.	Patrick Shanley (Celtic FC)	

880 yards
Pos	Athlete	Time
1.	Hugh Welsh (Watson's College AC)	2:00 4/5
2.	William H. Fitzherbert (Cambridge Un. AC)	
3.	David Harvey (Glasgow Un.)	

1 mile
Pos	Athlete	Time
1.	Hugh Welsh (Watson's College AC)	4:38 4/5
2.	James C. Macdonald (Stewart's Coll. FP)	

4 miles
Pos	Athlete	Time
1.	Jack Paterson (Watson's College AC)	21:33 3/5
2.	Alexander R. Gibb (Watson's College AC)	
3.	David Mill (Clydesdale H.)	

120 yard hurdles
Pos	Athlete	Time
1.	Hugh A. Fletcher (Edinburgh Un.)	16 4/5
2.	William Dove (Edinburgh H.)	
3.	Alexander Stronach (Glasgow Academicals)	

High jump
Pos	Athlete	Time
1.	John B. Milne (Dundee Gymnastic & AC)	5ft 9in (1.75m)
2=	William Dove (Edinburgh Academicals)	5ft 8in (1.72m)
2=	R. G. Murray (Clydesdale H.)	5ft 8in (1.72m)

Long jump
Pos	Athlete	Dist
1.	Hugh Barr (Clydesdale H.)	22ft 0 1/2in (6.72m)
2.	George D. Laing (Edinburgh Un.)	20ft 2in (6.14m)

Shot put
Pos	Athlete	Dist
1.	Malcolm N. MacInnes (Edinburgh Un.)	40ft 7 1/2in (12.38m)
2.	Hugh Nicolson (Kyles Athletic Football & Shinty Club)	39ft 7in (12.06m)
3.	R. Gunn (Glasgow Un.)	37ft 3in (11.35m)

Hammer
Pos	Athlete	Dist
1.	Malcolm N. MacInnes (Edinburgh Un.)	112ft 2 1/2in (34.20m)
2.	William Ogilvie (Ross & Cromarty AA)	107ft 3in (32.70m)
3.	R. Robertson (unattached)	99ft 1 1/2in (30.20m)

== 10 miles (track) ==
10 miles (track)
Pos	Athlete	Time
1.	William Badenoch (Edinburgh H.)	58:04 1/5

The 10-mile championship took place at Hampden Park, Glasgow, on Friday 7 April 1899. Only two men turned out for the race in bitterly cold weather and they ran in close company for five and a half miles when W. Laing (Edinburgh H.) retired, leaving William Badenoch of the same club to finish unopposed. splits (Field) 1 mile: 5:23.4, 11:00.6 (5:37.2), 16:40.8 (5:40.2), 22:26.0 (5:45.2), 28:10.6 (5:44.6), 33:55.0 (5:44.4), 39:48.0 (5:53.0), 45:50.8 (6:02.8), 51:59.0 (6:08.2), 58:04.2 (6:05.2).

== See also ==
- Scottish Athletics
- Scottish Athletics Championships
