= 1894 Scottish Athletics Championships =

Outdoor track and field competition

- Dates: 23 June
- Host city: Edinburgh, Scotland
- Venue: Powderhall Grounds
- Level: Senior
- Type: Outdoor
- Events: 12

The 1894 Scottish Athletics Championships were the twelfth national athletics championships to be held in Scotland. They were held under the auspices of the Scottish Amateur Athletic Association at Powderhall Grounds, Edinburgh, on Saturday 23 June 1894. The prizes were presented by Mrs James Greig, the wife of a prominent Scottish land owner and a judge at the championship.

== Background ==
The weather was dull and overcast and it rained intermittently throughout the afternoon, making it unpleasant for both the competitors and the approximately eight hundred spectators alike. Alfred Downer, now running for Scottish Pelicans, repeated his astonishing feat of last year in winning all three short-distance races. In the 100 yards and 220 yards his only opponent was easily beaten, but in the 440 yards he was dead last with 300 yards to go and gradually worked his way through the field of six and though visibly "in extremis," won by four yards.

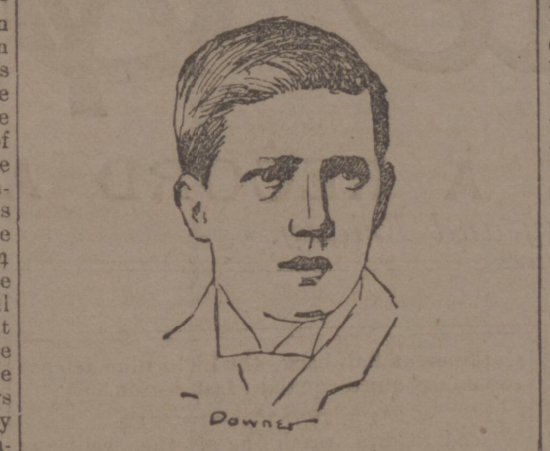
Alfred Downer (1873–1912) Scottish champion at 100 yards, 220 yards and 440 yards three years in succession.

Robert Mitchell (Abercorn FC), 5 feet 6 inches tall and weighing 9st 2 lb (58.1 kg), returned for his fifth win in the half mile, a record that will be equalled in 1924 by Donald MacRae (West of Scotland H.), and again in 1983 by Tom McKean (Bellshill YMCA H.), but never beaten (as of 2023).

Charles Fenwick (Dundee Amateur Gymnastic Soc.) won the high jump off wet grass with the best jump seen in Scotland for several years, while Hugh Barr (Clydesdale H.) returned to defend his long jump title, but was beaten by three inches (7 cm) with the very last jump of the competition.

== Results summary ==
100 yards
| Pos | Athlete | Time |
|---|---|---|
| 1. | Alfred R. Downer (Scottish Pelicans) | 10 3/5 |
| 2. | Douglas R. McCulloch (Helensburgh AC) | 3 yards |

220 yards
| Pos | Athlete | Time |
|---|---|---|
| 1. | Alfred R. Downer (Scottish Pelicans) | 22 4/5 |
| 2. | Douglas R. McCulloch (Helensburgh AC) | |

440 yards
| Pos | Athlete | Time |
|---|---|---|
| 1. | Alfred R. Downer (Scottish Pelicans) | 51 4/5 |
| 2. | Robert Mitchell (Abercorn FC) | 3 yards |
| 3. | Douglas R. McCulloch (Helensburgh AC) | |

880 yards
| Pos | Athlete | Time |
|---|---|---|
| 1. | Robert Mitchell (Abercorn FC) | 2:09 3/5 |
| 2. | Thomas B.H. Scott (Edinburgh Un.) | |
| 3. | Thomas Jaap (Edinburgh H.) | |

1 mile
| Pos | Athlete | Time |
|---|---|---|
| 1. | James Rodger (Carrick H.) | 5:36.0 |
| 2. | Hugh Welsh (Watson's Coll. AC) | inches |

4 miles
| Pos | Athlete | Time |
|---|---|---|
| 1. | Andrew Hannah (Clydesdale H.) | 20:48 4/5 |
| 2. | Stewart Duffus (Arbroath H.) | 8 yards |

120 yard hurdles
| Pos | Athlete | Time |
|---|---|---|
| 1. | Andrew L. Graham (1st Lanarkshire Rifle Volunteers) | 17 2/5 |
| 2. | John R. Gow (Rangers FC) | 2 yards |
| 3. | Frederick J. M. Swan (Glasgow Academicals) | |

High jump
| Pos | Athlete | Time |
|---|---|---|
| 1. | Charles Fenwick (Dundee Amateur Gymnastic Soc.) | 5 ft 9in (1.75m) |
| 2. | Andrew L. Graham (1st Lanarkshire Rifle Volunteers) | 5 ft 6in (1.67m) |

Long jump
| Pos | Athlete | Dist |
|---|---|---|
| 1. | William C. S. Taylor (Queen's Park FC) | 20 ft 9in (6.32m) |
| 2. | Hugh Barr (Clydesdale H.) | 20 ft 6in (6.25m) |
| 3. | Thomas M. Guthrie (Edinburgh Un.) | 20 ft 2in (6.14m) |

Shot put
| Pos | Athlete | Dist |
|---|---|---|
| 1. | James D. Macintosh (West End ARC) | 40 ft 10in (12.44m) |
| 2. | Malcolm N. MacInnes (Edinburgh Un.) | 38 ft 11in (11.86m) |

Hammer
| Pos | Athlete | Dist |
|---|---|---|
| 1. | James D. Macintosh (West End ARC) | 102 ft 7in (31.28m) |
| 2. | Malcolm N. MacInnes (Edinburgh Un.) | 94 ft 9in (28.88m) |

== 10 miles (track) ==
10 miles (track)
| Pos | Athlete | Time |
|---|---|---|
| 1. | Andrew Hannah (Clydesdale H.) | 54:02 3/5 |
| 2. | Sidney J. Cornish (Edinburgh H.) | 55:41 2/4 |

The 10-mile championship took place at Powderhall Grounds, Edinburgh, on Monday 2 April. Both the weather and the track were "perfect for the occasion," but only three men toed the line for Jock Dalziel to set them on their way, and one of them retired after only two miles. This left Andrew Hannah (Clydesdale H.) and Sid Cornish (Edinburgh H.) to decide the championship. By three miles Hannah had a clear lead, at four miles he was faster than had been run in the 4 miles championship itself, and at five miles he was inside Scottish record figures and leading by half a lap. Hannah set Scottish records at every mile from there to the finish, he lapped Cornish with 1000 yards to go and won by 470 yards. Thomas Hunter (Edinburgh H.), who dropped out at two miles, re-entered the race at seven and a half miles, with the referee's permission, and paced Hannah over the last couple of miles. splits (Edinburgh Evening News) 1 mile: 4:58.0, 10:12.4 (5:14.4), 15:30.0 (5:17.6), 20:56.0 (5:26.0), 26:25.2 (5:29.2), 32:00.8 (5:35.6), 37:34.2 (5:33.4), 43:08.8 (5:34.6), 48:37.4 (5:28.6), 54:02.6 (5:25.2).

== See also ==
- Scottish Athletics
- Scottish Athletics Championships
