= 1898 Scottish Athletics Championships =

Outdoor track and field competition

- Dates: 25 June
- Host city: Glasgow, Scotland
- Venue: Hampden Park
- Level: Senior
- Type: Outdoor
- Events: 11

The 1898 Scottish Athletics Championships were the sixteenth national athletics championships to be held in Scotland. They were held under the auspices of the Scottish Amateur Athletic Association at Hampden Park, Glasgow, on Saturday 25 June 1898.

== Background ==
A little more than four thousand spectators witnessed the first dead heat in a Scottish championship. Hugh Barr (Clydesdale H.) and James Auld (Ayr FC), tied in the final of the 100 yards in 10 4/5 seconds. At the second time of asking Barr led throughout and won by half a yard in the same time. Hugh Welsh (Watson's Coll. AC) had set a Scottish native record in the 1 mile in May but did not appear at the championship, reserving his effort for the international with Ireland in Dublin on 16 July where he won both the 880 yards and the 1 mile. At the championship, those two events went to William Robertson (Clydesdale H.), who had also won the 10 miles in April, and made a bold bid to hold all the distance event titles by turning out for the 4 miles. But it was too much and he was forced to retire at half way, at which point the race seemed a certainty for Jack Paterson (Watson's Coll.), the reigning cross country champion. But James Duffus, youngest of the three Duffus brothers from Arbroath, chased him hard all the way to the line and was only half a yard in arrears at the finish. splits (Scottish Referee) 1 mile: 5:05, 10:29 (5:24), 15:42 (5:13), 20:47.2 (5:05.2).

== Results summary ==
100 yards
Pos	Athlete	Time
1.	Hugh Barr (Clydesdale H.)	10 4/5
2.	James B. Auld (Ayr FC)	
3.	J. Bell (Borrowstounness)	

220 yards
Pos	Athlete	Time
1.	James B. Auld (Ayr FC)	23 3/5
2.	Hugh Barr (Clydesdale H.)	
3.	J. Bell (Borrowstounness)	

440 yards
Pos	Athlete	Time
1.	J. Donaldson (Salford H.)	52 3/4
2.	G. Catton Thomson (Edinburgh H.)	
3.	James B. Auld (Ayr FC)	

880 yards
Pos	Athlete	Time
1.	William Robertson (Clydesdale H.)	2:02.0
2.	J. F. Henry (Edinburgh H.)	
3.	David W. Mill (Clydesdale H.)	

1 mile
Pos	Athlete	Time
1.	William Robertson (Clydesdale H.)	4:38 4/5
2.	James C. MacDonald (Stewart's Coll.)	

4 miles
Pos	Athlete	Time
1.	Jack Paterson (Watson's Coll. AC)	20:47 1/5
2.	James S. Duffus (Clydesdale H.)	

120 yard hurdles
Pos	Athlete	Time
1.	Hugh N. Fletcher (Edinburgh Un.)	18sec.
2.	Walter Grieve (Edinburgh Un.)	

High jump
Pos	Athlete	Time
1.	John B. Milne (Dundee Gymnastic & AC)	5ft 9in (1.75m)
2.	J. MacFarlane (Maryhill H.)	5ft 7in (1.70m)
3.	William Grieve (Edinburgh Un.)	5ft 6in (1.67m)

Long jump
Pos	Athlete	Dist
1.	Hugh Barr (Clydesdale H.)	21ft 9 1/2in (6.64m)
2.	George D. Laing (Edinburgh Un.)	
3.	William C. S. Taylor (Queen's Park FC)	19ft 5 1/4in (5.92m)

Shot put
Pos	Athlete	Dist
1.	A. S. Stronach (Glasgow Academicals)	31ft 3in (9.52m)

Hammer
Pos	Athlete	Dist
1.	A. S. Stronach (Glasgow Academicals)	60ft 8in (18.50m)

== 10 miles (track) ==
10 miles (track)
Pos	Athlete	Time
1.	William Robertson (Clydesdale H.)	55:10 4/5
2.	D. M. Cameron (Maryhill H.)	56:42
3.	Alexander R. Blewes (Kirkcaldy H.)	59:31

The 10-mile championship took place at the Powderhall Grounds, Edinburgh, on Friday 15 April 1898. It rained for most of the day until shortly before the race and by the time of the start it had stopped and the weather cleared. Although there was no standing water on the track it was wet, and heavy, and times were not expected to be fast. Only four men toed the mark for the start: last year's winner William Robertson (Clydesdale H.), D. M. Cameron (Clydesdale H.), James S. Duffus (Clydesdale H.), and A. R. Blewes (Edinburgh Northern H.) and from Kirkcaldy. Robertson quickly took the lead and by half way was leading by 300 yards. At a little over six miles Duffus retired, and Robertson eventually won by over 500 yards. Cameron earned a standard medal for being inside 57 minutes. splits (Dundee Evening Telegraph) 1 mile: 5:02.0, 10:21.8 (5:19.8), 15:53.0 (5:31.2), 21:15.2 (5:22.2), 26:49.4 (5:34.2), 32:24.0 (5:34.6), 38:02.0 (5:38.0), 43:45.6 (5:43.6), 49:29.2 (5:43.6), 55:10.8 (5:41.6).

== See also ==
- Scottish Athletics
- Scottish Athletics Championships
