= 1897 Scottish Athletics Championships =

Outdoor track and field competition

- Dates: 26 June
- Host city: Glasgow, Scotland
- Venue: Celtic Park
- Level: Senior
- Type: Outdoor
- Events: nn

The 1897 Scottish Athletics Championships were the fifteenth national athletics championships to be held in Scotland. They were held under the auspices of the Scottish Amateur Athletic Association at Celtic Park, Glasgow, on Saturday 26 June 1897.

== Background ==
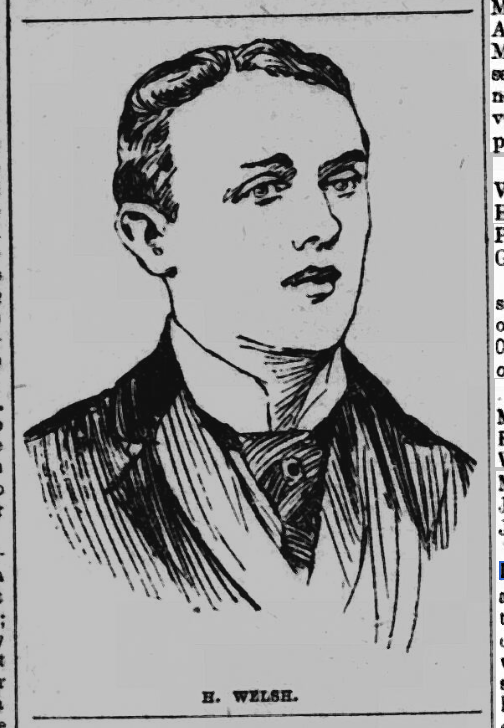
Hugh Welsh (20 Sep 1876) won Scottish AAA half-mile and 1 mile in 1896, 97, 99, and in 1898 and 1899 won both the half-mile and mile in the international against Ireland.

It rained in the morning but by lunchtime the weather had cleared and 9,000 spectators enjoyed sports in fine weather, with the band of the Argyle and Sutherland Highlanders entertaining spectators between events. The rain, however, left the track heavy for fast work and records were not expected. But there were two. Hugh Welsh (Watson's Coll.) defeated William Robertson (Clydesdale H.), the title holder and record holder for the 1 mile, and set new Scottish native figures of 4:24 1/5. In the hammer, James MacIntosh (West End Rowing Club), set new Scottish native and All-comers figures of 117ft 3in (35.74m).

== Results summary ==
100 yards
Pos	Athlete	Time
1.	Francis W. Sime (United Hospitals)	10 3/5
2.	Hugh Barr (Clydesdale H.)	
3.	T. Gordon (Motherwell H.)	

220 yards
Pos	Athlete	Time
1.	Francis W. Sime (United Hospitals)	23 2/4
2.	Hugh Barr (Clydesdale H.)	
3.	James B. Auld (Ayr FC)	

440 yards
Pos	Athlete	Time
1.	J. Donaldson (Salford H.)	52 4/5
2.	G. Catton Thomson (Edinburgh H.)	
3.	Robert D. F. Paul (London AC)	

880 yards
Pos	Athlete	Time
1.	Hugh Welsh (Watson's Coll. AC)	2:02
2.	John Barclay (West of Scotland H.)	
3.	David S. Harvey (Glasgow Un.)	

1 mile
Pos	Athlete	Time
1.	Hugh Welsh (Watson's Coll. AC)	4:24 1/5
2.	William Robertson (Clydesdale H.)	
3.	Gavin Stevenson (Ayr FC)	

4 miles
Pos	Athlete	Time
1.	Jack Paterson (Watson's Coll. AC)	21:10
2.	Alexander R. Gibb (Watson's Coll. AC)	

120 yard hurdles
Pos	Athlete	Time
1.	Alec B. Timms (Edinburgh Un.)	17 4/5
2.	William C. S. Taylor (Queen's Park FC)	

High jump
Pos	Athlete	Time
1.	John B. Milne (Dundee Gymnastic & AC)	5ft 6in (1.67m)
2.	J. McFarlane (Maryhill H.) 5ft 5in (1.65m)	

Long jump
Pos	Athlete	Dist
1.	Hugh Barr (Clydesdale H.)	21ft 11in (6.68m)
2.	William C. S. Taylor (Queen's Park FC)	20ft 0 3/4in (6.11m)
3.	Edward G. Affleck (Scottish Borderers)	18ft 9in (5.71m)

Shot put
Pos	Athlete	Dist
1.	James D. Macintosh (West End Amateur RC)	40ft 4in (12.29m)
2.	Hugh McDougall (Tarbert)	39ft 11 1/2in (12.18m)

Hammer
Pos	Athlete	Dist
1.	James D. Macintosh (West End Amateur RC)	117ft 3in (35.74m)
2.	Hugh McDougall (Tarbert)	86ft 2in (26.26m)

== 10 miles (track) ==
10 miles (track)
Pos	Athlete	Time
1.	William Robertson (Clydesdale H.)	56:19

The 10-mile championship took place at Hampden Park, Glasgow, on Friday 9 April 1897. It rained during the afternoon before the race and the track was a little heavy, but the weather was fine and dry with no wind to speak of. Neither of last year's champions returned to defend their title and there were only three starters, Stewart Duffus (Clydesdale H.), William Robertson (Clydesdale H.), and D. McAlpine (St Mirren FC). Duffus and Robertson went straight to the front and by half way were one mile ahead of McAlpine who dropped out at that point. The other two alternated the lead but neither seemed intent on pushing the pace and they arrived at the last lap together. Duffus struck first and established a narrow gap but Robertson soon got into "a grand stride" and overtook the man from Arbroath and went away when it appeared that Duffus had shot his bolt and stopped within sight of the tape. splits (Pall Mall Gazette) 1 mile: 5:20.2, 10:53.2 (5:33.0), 16:28.2 (5:35.0), 22:15.0 (5:46.8), 27:51.6 (5:36.6), 33:39.6 (5:48.0), 39:18.4 (5:38.8), 44:56.0 (5:37.6), 50:44.6 (5:48.6), 56:19.0 (5:34.4).

== See also ==
- Scottish Athletics
- Scottish Athletics Championships
