= 1889 Scottish Athletics Championships =

Outdoor track and field competition

- Dates: 22 June
- Host city: Glasgow, Scotland
- Venue: Hampden Park
- Level: Senior
- Type: Outdoor
- Events: 13

The 1889 Scottish Athletics Championships were the seventh national athletics championships to be held in Scotland. They were held under the auspices of the Scottish Amateur Athletic Association at Hampden Park, Glasgow, on Saturday 22 June 1889. The championship prizes were presented by Mrs M. P. Fraser, wife of the President of the association.

== Background ==
Despite the added attraction of some cycle races hosted by the National Cyclists' Union attendance, compared to previous years, was still considered poor, and the Scottish Referee offered the opinion that, "even a championship athletic gathering is very poor goods compared to a second-rate football match." The wind veered from the east to south-east as the afternoon progressed and gradually grew stronger, affecting performances in a number of events.

Ernest Stones (Ulverston AC) set a Scottish All-comers record of 11 ft 4in (3.45m) in winning the pole vault for the third successive year. He had three tries at what would have been a new world record height of 11 ft 8in (3.55m), but failed. The pole vault was not held again in the Scottish championship until 1921, and this performance remained the championship best until 1931 when it was beaten by Patrick Ogilvie of Cambridge University. Robert Mitchell (St Mirren FC), who won the half-mile championship, set Scottish Native and All-comers records of 1:15 3/5 for 600 yards at Ibrox Park on 3 August 1889. And John McWilliam (Clydesdale H.), who had dropped out of the 10 miles championship last year, set a Scottish All-comers record in beating Andrew Hannah to the 4 miles title, but nothing else is known about him except that he previously ran for Kilmarnock Harriers and was probably born there in or about 1865.

James Greig from Perth, had previously attended Edinburgh University, was currently at Clare College, Cambridge University, and won three events, the 120 yards hurdles, the high jump, and the long jump. He would later serve as a Captain in the King's Own Scottish Borderers in the Second Boer War and as a Major in World War I. He served as vice-President of the Scottish AAA in 1894 and died at Greenlaw, Berwickshire, in May 1932.

The Scottish cross country championship was run at Hamilton Park Racecourse on Saturday 9 March, but a significant portion of the leading athletes went off course, following a paper trail laid the previous Saturday, and the race was declared void and had to be re-run on Saturday 23 March. This required the 10 miles championship to be rescheduled and it was held at the Queen's Park Football Club Grounds, the same venue as the main championship, on the evening of Friday 12 April. With Alexander Findlay having emigrated it was certain there was to be new champion in this event and Andrew Hannah ultimately prevailed over fellow Clydesdale Harrier Charles Pennycook from Dundee.

== Results summary ==
100 yards
Pos	Athlete	Time
1.	Robert A. Taylor (Edinburgh Un.)	10 4/5
2.	Thomas Blair (Queen's Park FC)	2 yards
3.	James H. Allan (St George's FC)	inches

440 yards
Pos	Athlete	Time
1.	Thomas Blair (Queen's Park FC)	52 1/5
2.	James B Green (Irvine FC)	3 yards
3.	T. W. Young (Clydesdale H.)	3 yards

880 yards
Pos	Athlete	Time
1.	Robert Mitchell (St Mirren FC)	2:01
2.	John Wright (Clydesdale H.)	10 yards
3.	A. M. Marshal (Dumbarton Athletic FC)	8 yards

1 mile
Pos	Athlete	Time
1.	Charles Pennycook (Clydesdale H.)	4:29 4/5
2.	Samuel B. Figgis (Edinburgh Un.)	4:34 3/5

4 miles
Pos	Athlete	Time
1.	John W. McWilliam (Clydesdale H.)	20:56 1/5
2.	Andrew Hannah (Clydesdale H.)	21:03 1/5

120 yard hurdles
Pos	Athlete	Time
1.	James L. Greig (Cambridge Un.)	16 3/5
2.	John R. Gow (Rangers FC)	inches

3 miles walk
Pos	Athlete	Time
1.	W. Miller (Clyde FC)	23:50 1/5
2.	J. Urquhart (Edinburgh H.)	5 yards
3.	R. Pinkerton (Arthurlie FC)	

High jump
Pos	Athlete	Dist
1.	James L. Greig (Cambridge Un.)	5 ft 6in (1.67m)
2.	E. A. S. Bell (Edinburgh Wanderers)	5 ft 4in (1.62m)
3.	Reginald Williams (Edinburgh Un.)	5 ft 3in (1.60m)

Pole vault
Pos	Athlete	Dist
1.	Ernest Stones (Ulverston AC)	11 ft 4in (3.45m)
2.	J. A. T. Hall (Unattached)	10 ft 0in (3.05m)

Long jump
Pos	Athlete	Dist
1.	James L. Greig (Cambridge Un.)	20 ft 4in (6.20m)
2.	Reginald Williams (Edinburgh Un.)	17 ft 8 1/2in (5.40m)

Shot put
Pos	Athlete	Dist
1.	Kenneth Whitton (Edinburgh H.)	39 ft 1in (11.91m)
2.	T. Robertson (Edinburgh H.)	34 ft 9 1/2in (10.60m)
3.	T. A. Chalmers (Edinburgh Un.)	

Hammer
Pos	Athlete	Dist
1.	Kenneth Whitton (Edinburgh H.)	98 ft 0in (29.88m)
2.	James Cheyne (Unattached)	90 ft 3in (27.52m)
3.	T. Robertson (Edinburgh H.)	88 ft 0in (26.82m)

== 10 miles (track) ==
10 miles (track)
Pos	Athlete	Time
1.	Andrew Hannah (Clydesdale H.)	55:30 2/5
2.	Charles Pennycook (Clydesdale H.)	56:14 2/5
3.	Peter Addison (Edinburgh H.)	56:55 4/5

The 10-mile championship took place at Hampden Park, Glasgow on Friday 12 April. At twenty minutes to seven in the evening there were five starters from just two clubs. Charles Pennycook, Andrew Hannah, and A. G. Colquhoun of Clydesdale Harriers, with Peter Addison and David Duncan of Edinburgh Harriers. After one mile Hannah was leading by around twelve yards, with Colquhoun second and the others close up. After covering two miles Duncan retired, and after a further two laps Colquhoun joined him. Hannah and Pennycook were barely more than two yards apart throughout while Addison gradually drifted backwards until in the final half-mile Hannah, holder of the Scottish record at 4 miles, pulled away and won by almost 200 yards, and Addison in third was almost lapped. splits (Sporting Life) 1 mile: 5:04.8, 10:34.4 (5:29.6), 16:10.0 (5:35.6), 21:45.6 (5:35.6), 27:27.2 (5:41.6), 33:04.8 (5:37.6), 38:43.6 (5:38.8), 44:24.6 (5:41.0), 50:02.6 (5:38.0), 55:30.4 (5:27.8).

== See also ==
- Scottish Athletics
- Scottish Athletics Championships
