= Scottish Athletics Championships =

Annual track and field competition

- Sport: Track and field
- Founded: 1883
- Country: Scotland

The Scottish Athletics Championships is an annual outdoor track and field competition organised by Scottish Athletics that serves as the Scottish national championship for the sport. The competition is usually held over two days in August, with the 10,000 metres and combined event championships being held separately. The event was first held, for men only, in 1883, when they were organised by the Scottish Amateur Athletics Association. Women's championships started in 1931. In 1992 the three organising bodies for the sport in Scotland merged to form the Scottish Athletics Federation, and they organised the championships until 2001 when they were superseded by Scottish Athletics.

== Evolution of events ==
At the first championship there were twelve individual events for men only: 100 yards, 440 yards, 880 yards, 1 mile, 120 yard hurdles, 3 miles walk, high jump, pole vault, long jump, shot put, hammer, and throwing the cricket ball. This last event was never held again so the winning throw in 1883 of 322 ft 5in (98.26m) is still the championship best performance. The 10 miles track race and cross country championships were both introduced in 1886, and in 1887 the 4 miles was included for the first time. The 220 yards was added in 1892 and in 1919, in line with the AAA championship, the one mile medley relay was introduced. In 1921 two events more familiar from Highland Games were first held, throwing the 56 lb weight, and throwing the Scots style hammer. These events were last held in 1947 and 1948 respectively. In 1923 the 7 miles walk was introduced to the championship and in 1925 the discus and javelin were first held. In 1931 women's championships started and in 1934 the 4 miles was dropped and replaced with 3 miles and 6 miles events. 1934 also saw the introduction of the 2 miles steeplechase. The triple jump was added to the programme in 1937. The marathon was first held in 1946, the 440 yard hurdles in 1947, and the 4 x 110 yards relay in 1948. In 1953 the 4 x 440 yards relay was first held, the 3,000 metre steeplechase replaced the 2 miles event in 1955 and in 1960 the Scottish national decathlon championship was held for the first time.

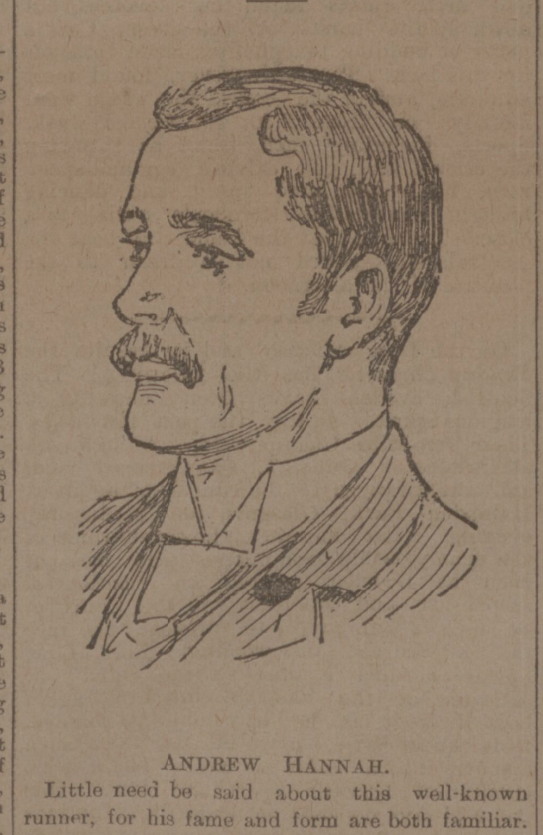
Andrew Hannah set multiple Scottish records at distances from 2 miles to 10 miles

Women's championships started in 1931 with eight individual events and two relays: 100 yards, 220 yards, 440 yards, 880 yards, 100 yards hurdles, high jump, long jump, shot put, 4 x 110 yards relay, and 1 mile medley relay. In 1932 the distance for the hurdles was changed to 80 yards, and in 1937 this was changed to 80 metres and the event was last held in 1968. In 1932 they added the javelin, 1935 saw the addition of a 1-mile walk, and the discus was added in 1936. In 1952 the longest race for women was increased to 1 mile, and the pentathlon was added in 1959, becoming the heptathlon in 1981. In 1966 a 4 x 220 yards relay was added to the programme, which became 4 x 200 metres relay in 1969 and was last held in 1973. That same year, 1973, they added the 400 metre hurdles, and in 1974 women competed for a 4 x 400 metres relay championship for the first time. Following the debut of the women's marathon at the summer Olympics in 1984, Scottish Athletics added the 10,000 metres to their championships in 1985, and in 1989 they added a 3 x 800 metres relay. In 1990 the triple jump was trialled and became a championship event in 1991, then in 1992 the hammer was tried on the same basis and became a championship event from 1993. Women's pole vault was included for the first time in 1994, and the following year the 3000 metres was replaced with a 5000-metre championship. A 2000-metre steeplechase was tried twice, in 2003 and 2004, then in 2007 it became a 3000-metre steeplechase championship. The men's and women's programmes are now the same, with the exception of the distance of the sprint hurdles and the combined events, where women compete for a heptathlon title whilst the men have a decathlon championship.

In line with the rest of the world Scottish athletics championships went metric in 1969, with the exception of the women's 1 mile medley relay which became a 1600 metres medley relay in 1970.

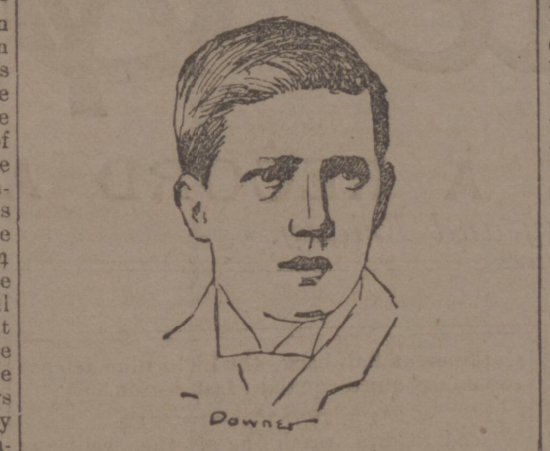
Alfred Downer (1873-1912) Scottish champion at 100 yards, 220 yards and 440 yards three years in succession.

current event list 100m, 200m, 400m, 800m, 1500m, 5000m, 10,000m, 100mH (women only), 110mH (men only), 400mH, 3000mSt, high jump, pole vault, long jump, triple jump, shot put, discus, hammer, javelin, heptathlon (women only), decathlon (men only), 4 × 100 m relay, 4 × 400 m relay, 3 x 800m relay.

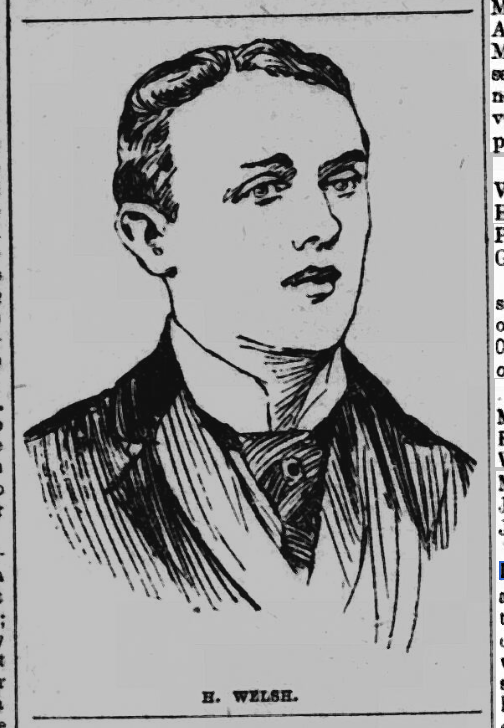
Hugh Welsh (20 Sep 1876) won Scottish AAA half-mile and 1 mile in 1896, 97, 99, and in 1898 and 1899 won both the half-mile and mile in the international against Ireland.

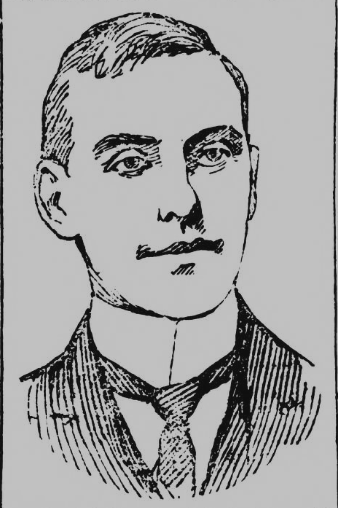
William E. Callender, of Watson's College, Edinburgh, Scottish 100 yards and 220 yards champion in 1899.

== Championship bests ==
Men's events
Event	Time/dist	Athlete	Year
100m	10.0w	Allan Wells (Edinburgh Southern H.)	1979
	10.00w	Ian Mackie (Pitreavie Amateur AC)	1998
200m	20.11	Allan Wells (Edinburgh Southern H.)	1980
400m	46.47	Brian Whittle (Ayre Seaforth AC)	1989
800m	1:44.79	Tom McKean (Bellshill YMCA H.)	1989
1500m	3:41.75	Nat Muir (Shettleston H.)	1981
5000m	13:33.4	David Black (Small Heath H.)	1975
10,000m	28:28.35	Allister Hutton (Edinburgh Southern H.)	1981
110mH	13.59w	David Nelson (Wolverhampton & Bilston AC)	1990
	13.82	Allan Scott (Whitemoss AAC)	2007
400mH	50.45	Charles Robertson-Adams (Newham & Essex Beagles AC)	2001
3000mSt	8:38.9	Ian Gilmour (Clyde Valley AC)	1978
high jump	2.28	David Anderson (Australia)	1991
pole vault	5.33	Jax Thoirs (Victoria Park City of Glasgow AC)	2019
long jump	7.98	Chris Tomlinson (Newham & Essex Beagles AC)	2002
triple jump	16.32	Craig Duncan (Edinburgh Southern H.)	1987
shot put	19.10	Scott Lincoln (City of York AC)	2018
discus	60.74	Werner Reiterer (Australia)	1992
hammer	74.63	Mark Dry (Woodford Green with Essex Ladies AC)	2014
javelin	80.38	James Campbell (Cheltenham & County H. )	2010
decathlon	7510	Peter Glass (Liverpool H.)	2013
4 × 100 m relay	41.56	Victoria Park City of Glasgow AC	2023
4 × 400 m relay	3:15.3	Edinburgh AC	1979
3 x 800m relay	5:44.48	Cambuslang H.	2023

Events no longer held - men
Event	Time/dist	Athlete	Year	Last held
1 mile	4:03.9	Graham Everett (Shettleston H.)	1960	1968
4 miles	19:58.8	Robert R Sutherland (Garscube H.)	1931	1933
10 miles (track)	47:58.6	Lachie Stewart (Shettleston H.)	1971	1975
56 lb weight	35 ft 5 1/2in (10.81m)	Donald Campbell (Glasgow Police AC)	1933	1947
Scots' style hammer	120 ft 5in (36.70m)	George Mitchell (Glasgow Police AC)	1928	1948
throwing the cricket ball	322 ft 5in (98.26m)	Robert Bruce (Glasgow Un.)	1883	1883
3000m walk	11:47.4	Steve Beecroft (Australia)	1991	1991
3 miles walk	21:43.4	George Galloway (Surrey Walking Club)	1933	1948
10,000m walk	44:54.2	Roy Thorpe (Sheffield United H.)	1973	1975
7 miles walk (track)	51:42.4	Colin McLellan (Shettleston H.)	1925	1930
1600m medley relay	3:23.7	Victoria Park AAC	1969	1999

Women's events
Event	Time/dist	Athlete	Year
100m	11.34	Merlene Ottey (Slovenia)	2006
200m	22.90w	Allison Curbishley (Edinburgh Woollen Mill)	1998
	23.36	Sandra Whittaker (Glasgow AC)	1984
400m	51.96	Allison Curbishley (Edinburgh Woollen Mill)	2000
800m	2:01.98	Yvonne Murray (Edinburgh AC)	1988
1500m	4:08.14	Lynne MacIntyre (Glasgow AC)	1989
5000m	16:06.95	Annabel Simpson (Fife AC)	2022
10,000m	32:57.91	Hayley Haining (Kilbarchan AAC)	2008
100mH	13.26w	Patricia Rollo (Pitreavie AAC)	1984
	13.70	Jill Kirk (Borough of Enfield AC)	1986
400mH	56.9	Eilidh Child (Pitreavie AAC)	2008
3000mSt	10:10.76	Emily Stewart (Edinburgh AC)	2013
high jump	1.89	Julie Crane (Sale Harriers Manchester)	2004
pole vault	4.06	Henrietta Paxton (Birchfield H.)	2009
long jump	6.52	Sheila Sherwood (Sheffield United H.)	1972
triple jump	13.15	Nony Mordi (Shaftesbury Barnet H.)	2010
shot put	15.65	Alison Rodger (Sale Harriers Manchester)	2008
discus	57.32	Margaret Ritchie (Edinburgh Southern H.)	1982
hammer	64.81	Shirley Webb (Trafford AC)	2005
javelin	53.48	Lorna Jackson (Edinburgh Woollen Mill)	2000
heptathlon	5422	Holly McArthur (Edinburgh AC)	2019
4 × 100 m relay	47.0	Edinburgh Southern H.	1970
4 × 400 m relay	3:44.9	Pitreavie AAC	1981
3 x 800m relay	6:46.71	City of Glasgow AC	1992

Events no longer held - women
Event	Time/dist	Athlete	Year	Last held
1 mile	5:08.4	Helen Cherry (Bellahouston H.)	1963	1968
3000m	9:01.12	Elizabeth Lynch (St Francis AC)	1986	1994
80mH	11.5	Sandra Dyson (Bury & Radcliffe AC)	1966	1968
200mH	27.5	Sandra Dyson (Bury & Radcliffe AC)	1971	1972
2000mSt	6:58.10	Hana Carroll (Liverpool H.)	2004	2004
pentathlon	4452	Moira Walls (Western AAC)	1969	1980
1 mile walk	8:43.8	Vera Murray (Dundee Hawkhill H.)	1935	1935
4 × 200 m relay	1:40.2	Edinburgh Southern H.	1969	1973
	1:40.2	Maryhill Ladies AC	1970	1973
1600m medley relay	3:54.4	Pitreavie AAC	1979	1988

== Dates and venues ==
For a number of years there had been a disagreement in Scottish athletics over whether professional cycle racing events should be allowed at amateur athletics meetings. There were strong views both in favour and against the position, and arriving at a deadlock in their negotiations several western district clubs in favour of allowing professional cycle events, led by Clydesdale Harriers, seceded from the SAAA and formed the Scottish Amateur Athletics Union (SAAU). The consequence of this was that there were two national championships in both 1895 and 1896 held under the auspices of the two separate bodies. In both years the two championships were held on the same day, with the SAAA adhering to their policy of alternating between an Eastern and a Western venue, while the SAAU held their championship at Hampden Park, Glasgow on both occasions.

Scottish Athletics Championship Dates and Venues
Date	Venue	Source
23 June 1883	Powderhall Grounds, Edinburgh	
28 June 1884	Powderhall Grounds, Edinburgh	
27 June 1885	St Mirren FC Ground, Westmarch, Paisley	
26 June 1886	Powderhall Grounds, Edinburgh	
25 June 1887	Hampden Park, Glasgow	
23 June 1888	Powderhall Grounds, Edinburgh	
22 June 1889	Hampden Park, Glasgow	
21 June 1890	Powderhall Grounds, Edinburgh	
20 June 1891	Hampden Park, Glasgow	
25 June 1892	Carolina Port, Dundee	
17 June 1893	Hampden Park, Glasgow	
23 June 1894	Powderhall Grounds, Edinburgh	
22 June 1895	Ibrox Park, Glasgow (SAAA)	
22 June 1895	Hampden Park, Glasgow (SAAU)	
27 June 1896	Powderhall Grounds, Edinburgh (SAAA)	
27 June 1896	Hampden Park, Glasgow (SAAU)	
26 June 1897	Celtic Park, Glasgow	
25 June 1898	Hampden Park, Glasgow	
24 June 1899	Hampden Park, Glasgow	
23 June 1900	Powderhall Grounds, Edinburgh	
22 June 1901	Powderhall Grounds, Edinburgh	
21 June 1902	Hampden Park, Glasgow	
