= A. G. G. Asher =

Scotland international rugby union player & cricketer

Sir Augustus Grant-AsherCBE
- Born: Augustus Gordon Grant-Asher; 18 December 1861 Poona, British India
- Died: 15 June 1930 (aged 68) Kingussie, Scotland

Rugby union career
- Position: Half-back
Amateur team(s)
Years	Team	Apps	(Points)
- Oxford University
1885	Edinburgh Wanderers		
1886	Fettesian-Lorettonians		
Provincial / State sides
Years	Team	Apps	(Points)
1885	Edinburgh District		
1886	East of Scotland District		
International career
Years	Team	Apps	(Points)
1882–86	Scotland	7	

50th President of the Scottish Rugby Union
- In office 1929–1930
- Preceded by: David McCowan
- Succeeded by: Andrew Balfour

Sir Augustus Gordon Grant-Asher CBE (18 December 1861 – 15 June 1930) was a Scotland international rugby union player. He also represented Scotland as a cricket player.

== Rugby Union career ==
=== Amateur career ===
Grant-Asher went to Loretto School, and went up to Brasenose College, Oxford after that.

He played for Oxford University RFC, as well as the Fettesian-Lorettonian Club, and Edinburgh Wanderers.

=== Provincial career ===
He was capped by Edinburgh District for the inter-city match in 1885 while with Edinburgh Wanderers.

He was capped by East of Scotland District for their match against West of Scotland District. This was at the end of January 1886; and he was now with Fettesian-Lorettonians.

=== International career ===
One of the earliest Scottish players, he was capped 7 times for Scotland between 1882 and 1886. He played at half back.

R.J. Phillips, the first historian of Scottish rugby said:

"no one has arisen to bear comparison with A.R. Don Wauchope at quarter or half back, where he and A.G.G. Asher still hold claim as the greatest pair to have played together for their country."

=== Administrative career ===
He was president of the Scottish Rugby Union from 1929 to 1930.

== Cricket career ==
At Oxford, he played in 10 first-class cricket matches for the Oxford University team in 1883 and 1884, winning a Blue for cricket in 1883. He also played for the Scotland national cricket team.

== Other sports ==
He also won the Scottish pole vault championship in 1885, and 1886.

== Law career ==
In later life he was a Writer to the Signet.

== Honours ==
He was appointed CBE in the 1918 Birthday Honours and knighted in the 1927 Birthday Honours.

== Death ==
He is buried in the churchyard of Insh Church, Kincraig, near Kingussie, Highland.

== See also ==
- List of Scottish cricket and rugby union players
