= Samuel Stevenson =

British long-distance runner

Sam Stevenson
Personal information
- Nationality: British (Scottish)
- Born: 21 September 1884 Whifflet, Coatbridge, Scotland
- Died: 14 August 1948 (aged 63) Coatbridge, Scotland

Sport
- Sport: Athletics
- Event: Long-distance running
- Club: Clydesdale Harriers

Samuel Stevenson (21 September 1884 – 14 August 1948) was a British long-distance runner who competed at the 1908 Summer Olympics.

== Biography ==
Stevenson was born in Whifflet, Coatbridge, Scotland and was a member of the Clydesdale Harriers. He was a four-times Scottish champion from 1905 to 1906, winning the 10 miles championship in 1905, the 4 miles championship in 1905 and 1906 and the cross country championship in 1906.

He represented Scotland three times at the International cross country championships from 1904 to 1906 and won the 4 miles race for Scotland in the international match against Ireland in 1906.

Stevenson was named in the Great Britain team for the 1908 Olympic Games in London, where he was selected to compete in the 5 mile race and marathon. In the men's 5 miles, Stevenson finished third in heat 5, just missing out on a place in the Olympic final. He did not start the marathon.
