= Westmarch, Paisley =

Former football stadium in Paisley, Scotland

Westmarch

- Location within Renfrewshire
- Location: Paisley, Scotland
- Coordinates: 55.8529°N 4.4460°W
- Surface: Grass
- Record attendance: 8,000

Construction
- Opened: 1883

Tenant
- St Mirren (1883–1894)

Westmarch was a football stadium located on Greenhill Road in Ferguslie Park, Paisley, Scotland. It was the home ground of St Mirren from 1883 to 1894.

== History ==
St Mirren moved to Westmarch from their Thistle Park ground in 1883. The first match was played on 25 August, with the visiting Queen's Park team beaten 2–1. St Mirren were amongst the founders of the Scottish Football League in 1890, and the first league match at Westmarch was played on 20 September 1890, in which local rivals Abercorn were beaten 4–2. By that time the ground had a stand at the western end of ground, some way from the pitch, which was surrounded by a racing and cycling track. On 22 October 1892 the club recorded its highest league attendance at Westmarch when 8,000 saw a 3–1 defeat to Celtic.

In 1894 the club decided to move after the landlord doubled their rent. After attempting to buy their former Shortroods ground, a site was found and developed on Love Street. The final league match was played at Westmarch on 17 February 1894, with St Mirren beating Dundee 10–3, also the highest scoring league game to have been played at the ground. The final game was against Abercorn in the final of the Paisley Charity Cup, a match that ended in a 10–0 victory for St Mirren.

The ground was subsequently used for trotting before being purchased by the Caledonian Railway in order to build a line between Paisley St James and Barrhead. The new line opened on 1 October 1902.

== Other sports ==
The Scottish Athletics Championships were held at Westmarch on Saturday 27 June 1885. The ground was reported as, "really good going," but the arrangements were thought to be, "unworthy of a gathering of such importance." David Duncan, (Royal High School), the president of the Scottish AAA, won the mile for the third successive time.
