= Lat Stones =

British pole vaulter (1865–1927)

Personal information
- Born: October 1865 Ulverston, Lancashire
- Died: 20 October 1927 (aged 62) Bootle, Lancashire

Sport
- Sport: Athletics
- Event: 120 yards hurdles

Ernest Latimer Stones (October 1865 – 20 October 1927) was an English amateur track and field athlete, who broke the world record for the pole vault (known as the pole jump at the time) at the Northern Counties Championships at Southport in June 1888. He cleared 11 feet 7 inches (3.53m) to beat by three-eighths of an inch the record then held by Thomas Ray of Ulverston. The record lasted for three years and one month until Richard Dickinson cleared 11 feet 9 inches (3.58m) at Kidderminster in July 1891.

== Biography ==
Born in Ulverston, Lancashire in October 1865, after moving to Bootle, Liverpool, Stones tied for the pole jump title becoming British champion at the 1888 AAA Championships and then won it outright at the 1889 AAA Championships.

He won the Scottish Championships three times in succession, 1887, 1888, and 1889. In the latter year, he set a Scottish National record that was not beaten until 1930. He won the Canadian and Irish Championships both once, and is the only Briton ever to win a United States pole vault title, winning the Amateur Athletic Union Championship at Travers Island, New York in September 1889. He died on 20 October 1927, aged 62, at 267 Knowsley Road, Bootle. His wife of 35 years, Mary Elizabeth (née Goodall) survived him.
