= Ian Young (marathon runner) =

British marathon runner

Ian Young is a British marathon runner who runs for Ayr Seaforth AAC.

In the 2015 London Marathon he gained the record for "Fastest Marathon dressed as a Monk" at 3:27:17; he also holds the record for "Fastest Half Marathon dressed as a Monk".
