= Rockaway Hunting Club =

Historic country club on Long Island, NY

Coordinates: 40°36′52.09″N 73°42′53.27″W

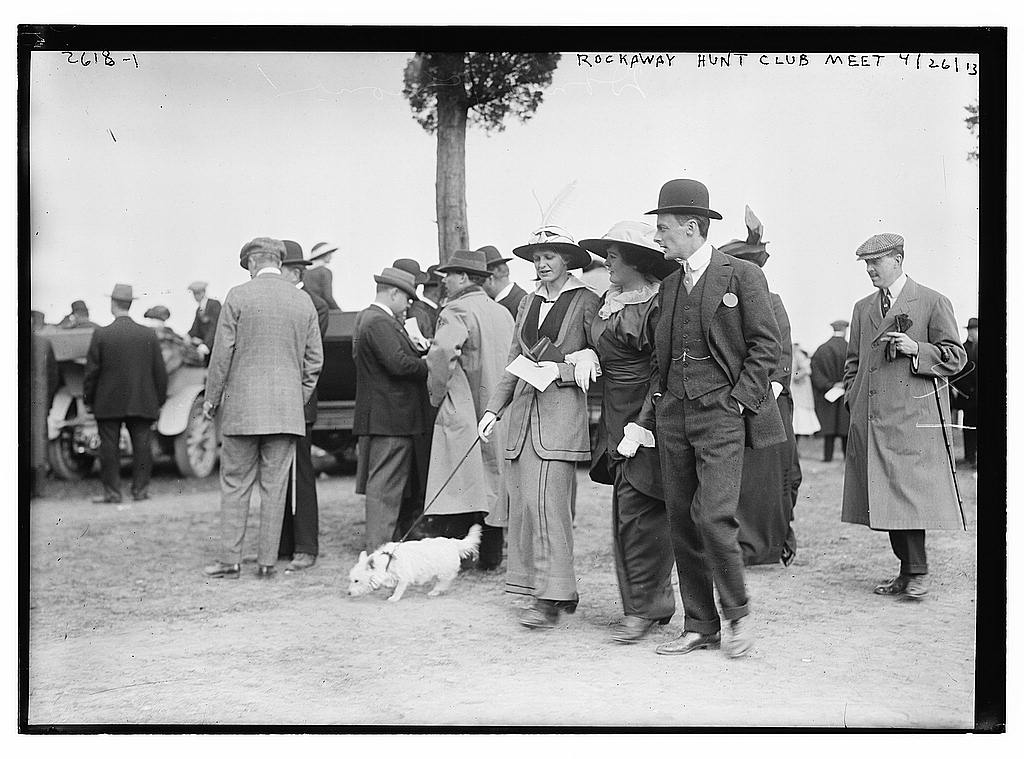
Rockaway Hunt Club on April 26, 1913

The Rockaway Hunting Club is a country club and sporting venue established in 1878 in Cedarhurst, New York (now Lawrence) and is one of the oldest country clubs in the United States.

== History ==
The club is located in Lawrence, Long Island, New York. It originally started in Far Rockaway, Queens, but moved to its current location, the former Richard A. Peabody estate known as "Terrace Hall," in the late 19th century.

The Rockaway Hunting Club is one of the oldest country clubs in the United States, with a history in both hunting and golf. In 1893 the original clubhouse was lost in a fire. In 1917, the golf course was expanded from 9 holes to 18 holes.

== See also ==
- Inwood Country Club
- Seawane Country Club
