= Ayr Seaforth Athletic Club =

Scottish athletics club

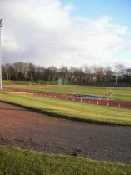
- Ground: Dam Park Stadium
- Website: ayrseaforth.co.uk

Ayr Seaforth Athletic Club is an athletics club located in Ayr, Scotland. The club trains at Dam Park track, situated outside Ayr College. Dam park track is made up of tartan track. This track runs for 400 m with eight lanes around the full length. Dam park has a high jump area, a triple jump pit, a long jump pit, a shot put area, a javelin area, a hammer throw area and a football pitch.

== Notable athletes ==
Brian Whittle is a British athlete who competed in both the 1986 European Championships in Athletics and the 1994 European Championships in Athletics; in both of these races he won gold. During his youth, he ran at Ayr Seaforth and Enfield Athletics club, where he began to train for the 4 × 400 metres relay; he since has moved to Enfield and Haringey Athletic Club.

== Training provided ==
Ayr Seaforth has coaches that help train the athletes to improve.

=== Track and field ===
For track and field athletes, the training regime is for two hours every Tuesday and Thursday, during the winter training period athletes are asked to take part in specialist winter training. The winter training helps boost an athlete's endurance and stamina by getting athletes to go hill running (this usually takes place on Sundays). The track and field training usually have sessions of light speed training and heavy sets of endurance training this will allow the athlete to gain valuable skills to allow them to compete at a club or national level.

=== Road running ===
Participants in road running for Ayr Seaforth meet up twice a week to train on the track at Dam Park Stadium and then usually once a week participate physically in road running. Road running is considered to be long-distance running and Ayr Seaforth usually consider road running distance to me around 6–10 miles.

=== Cross country ===
The club does not offer any specific training for cross country. However, during summer, Ayr Seaforth run off-road around the River Ayr and Auchincruive area. There are also many cross country competitions and relays during the winter season. Many younger runners are encouraged to begin training for cross country before specializing in a specific track and field event. Much of the cross country takes place in local outdoor areas.

== Training grounds ==
Ayr Seaforth train at Dam Park Stadium, which is an athletics facility operated by South Ayrshire Council and located less than a mile from Ayr town centre. It consists of an eight-lane trace with polymeric surface which was resurfaced in July 2002, and holds a provision for field events, such as long jump, high jump and javelin. The Stadium's field area is often used to hold football matches.

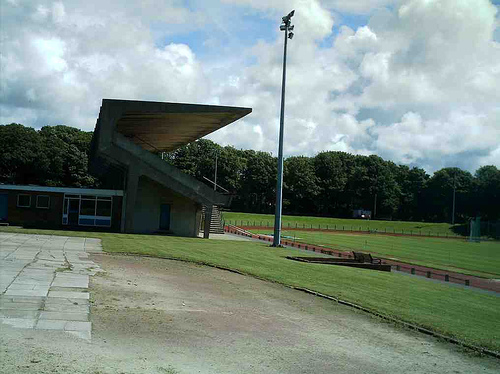
Dam Park grandstand

The Pavilion in Dam Park has five changing rooms, two toilet and shower blocks, two storerooms for equipment and a general purpose area. There is a seating capacity of 478 spectators in the pavilion and also a press box.

The stadium is mainly used for athletics coaching and football events, nevertheless a wide range of outdoor activities can be accommodated. Music festivals, such as Jam At The Dam, fire safety events and dog trials have previously taken place at Dam Park.

== Events ==
Club Championship - the yearly club race meeting which consists of track and field events. Mainly sprint, long jump, triple jump, steeplechase, high jump, shot put.

Turkey trot - a 10 km road race held just after Christmas to give road racing athletes a bit of a challenge. Organised by Ayrodynamic Triathlon Club.

Scottish Juniors - an event that allows younger runners (Under-18s) compete against athletes of their own age as well as similar talents or skills.

UK School Games - an event that allows school children to compete in possibly their first large-scale event.

5 KM series - an event usually taking place along Ayr shore front, (usually for road running athletes) as the name implies the length of the course is 5 km however there is also a 3 km run available as well.

There are many cross country events that allow athletes compete across Scotland; some of these are:

- National Cross Country Relay
- Ayrshire Cross Country Championships

. West District Cross Country Relays . Club Cross Country Championship . Scottish Road Relay Championships . Scottish Junior Road Relay Championships . Scottish Schools Cross Country Championships . National Cross Country Championships

== History ==
Little is known about the origins of the club but it appears that the club was established around the 1950s.

== Membership ==
When an athlete becomes a member at Ayr seaforth they are then able to compete for the club at either club level or national level. This also means the athlete can wear club colors when competing, Ayr seaforth colors consist of a white vest with a red cross. These colors also resemble the club logo. Membership usually consists of a once a year fee, this fee is used to help cover club costs such as upkeep and insurance for the athletes using the facilities. All coaches are volunteers and give up their time to help develop young athletes.
