= Clydesdale Harriers =

Scottish athletics club

- Founded: 1885
- Ground: St Peter the Apostle High School
- Location: Kirkoswald Drive, Clydebank G81 2DB, Scotland
- Coordinates: 55°54′58″N 4°24′08″W
- Website: official website

Clydesdale Harriers are an athletics club, founded in 1885. It was Scotland's first amateur open athletics club with the object of promoting amateur athletics generally and cross country running in particular.

The club uses the athletics track at the St Peter the Apostle High School and train on Tuesday and Thursday evenings.

== History ==
=== Foundations ===
Clydesdale Harriers was founded in May 1885 and based in Glasgow and had five sections within the city boundaries and sections were also maintained in Lanarkshire, Dunbartonshire, Ayrshire, Renfrewshire as well as in the towns of Greenock, Ayr and Airdrie. As the sections developed they became independent clubs. Clubs such as Greenock Glenpark AC, Monklands AC and Paisley Harriers clubs owe their start to Clydesdale, as well as private schools' former-pupil clubs (such as Fettesian-Lorettonian Club) and teams from universities. As was common, sportsmen were often affiliated to clubs in different sports and Clydesdale had links with cycling, boxing, skating and football clubs with a particularly strong link with the Rangers club. Indeed, several founders of the Rangers were also founder members of the Harriers. When Celtic FC was founded they signed up several Harriers including Tom Maley and his brother Willie, who went on to become one of their greatest managers of all time and incidentally President of the Scottish Amateur Athletics Association (SAAA). Up to the first war, the club provided numerous champions and won 14 Scottish National Team Championships.

=== After the war ===
Over 200 members were lost in the Great War and the club went from a national club to a local club and settled in Clydebank as its base in the early 1920s. Success was hard to come by, after the war many members just did not want to come back, the entire Committee (with two exceptions) were killed in the hostilities and the Depression meant that many had to work hard including weekends or leave the district in search of work. Nevertheless, the club built up gradually and just when they were starting to 'come good' the Second War came along. The really bright spot in this period was the running and winning of the Ladies Cross Country team, which won the cross country championship of Scotland in 1936/37/38 and produced the only internationalist in the form of Jean Tait. Nevertheless, the club had many good servants during this period who made sure that during the 1939-45 period a War Continuation Committee was in existence setting its sights on a quicker return to action than had been possible in 1918.

From 1945 to 1960, the club took part in many innovative activities and won many trophies with a host of top class athletes. Clydesdale had been the first to set up a Junior (under-18) section in 1918 and one of the first with a Ladies Section (1931). It organised one of the first annual races for Youths (the Johnny Youth Ballot Team Race) in 1946 and it was a member of the CH who moved that there be a Scottish Championship for under-15 Boys. As far as racing was concerned, John Wright won the national Junior Cross Country Championship twice and the senior men's team was third in 1955. The club helped set up the Dunbartonshire County Association with Garscube Harriers, Dumbarton AAC and Vale of Leven AAC, a very successful Association still going strong: at its peak in the late 1980s there were 13 clubs in membership.

=== 1960s to present ===
Between 1960 and 1985, the club performed well in all the endurance events with athletes including Phil Dolan, Robert McWatt, Allan Faulds, Ian Leggett and Doug Gemmell all representing Scotland at various levels. In track and field the sole internationalist was Ian Logie, who competed in the pole vault for Scotland three times in one year in the mid-1960s. Over the 1970s the club won the Maley Trophy and were West District Cross Country Champions three times.

In 1985 the club entered the Scottish Men's Track and Field League. There were four GB representatives at Under 20 or Senior level (Des Roache, Ewan Calvert, Grant Graham and Jason Allan.

In 1995, the cross country runners won the West District Relays—a title.

In 2003 Graeme Reid won the Scottish National Senior Men's Cross Country Championship to be the first Clydesdale to win it since Dunky Wright exactly 80 years earlier.

== Notable athletes ==
=== Olympians ===
Athlete	Events	Games	Medals/Ref
Duncan McPhee	1500m, 3000m team	1920	Silver medal
Samuel Stevenson	5 miles	1908	
Dunky Wright	marathon	1924, 1928, 1932	

- Scottish unless stated

== Sources ==
1. Clydesdale Harriers: A Centenary History 1885-1985 by Brian McAusland ISBN 1-870711-00-9
2. Runs Will Take Place Whatever the Weather by Colin A Shields (Official History of the Cross Country Union of Scotland) ISBN 0-9516681-0-2
