= Scottish Athletics =

Governing body for athletics in Scotland

- Sport: Athletics
- Abbreviation: SA
- Founded: 1 April 2001
- Affiliation: UK Athletics
- Replaced: Scottish Athletics Federation

Official website
- www.scottishathletics.org.uk

Scottish Athletics (Scottish Gaelic: Lùth-chleasachd na h-Alba), stylised as scottishathletics, is the governing body for the sport of athletics in Scotland. As such it is responsible for organising annual championships, maintaining rules for competition and ratifying records. It also selects teams for international competition, and coordinates courses for those aspiring to coach or officiate at meetings. Scottish Athletics is a member of the Commonwealth Games Council for Scotland, and part of UK Athletics, the national governing body for the sport in the United Kingdom. It was established as a limited company on 1 April 2001, when it succeeded the Scottish Athletics Federation (SAF), which had in turn succeeded the Scottish Amateur Athletic Association that had organised the sport since its inception in February 1883.

== History ==
On Thursday 25 January 1883 there was a meeting, in Edinburgh, of interested parties, to discuss the formation of an association, "similar to that recently formed in London" and to consider the promotion of an annual championship meeting. On Monday 26 February the Scottish Amateur Athletic Association was formed. They received letters of support and affiliation from various athletic bodies throughout Scotland, and a few days later they appointed their first set of officials, published their first list of affiliated clubs, thirteen in number, and announced that their first championship would be held at the Powderhall Grounds, Edinburgh, on Saturday 23 June.

Within the athletics community itself this was perceived to be an East of Scotland affair, while the majority of the clubs that held sports of their own were to be found at that time in the West of Scotland, including Clydesdale Harriers, the oldest athletics club in Scotland. These clubs, twelve in number, held a meeting of their own, in a Glasgow hotel, on Tuesday 6 March, where they formed their own association called the West of Scotland Amateur Athletic Association. They scheduled their championship to be held at Rugby Park, Kilmarnock, on Saturday 16 June 1883. These championships can, therefore, justifiably claim to have been the first truly representative athletic championships to be held in Scotland.

Only twenty athletes turned up for that first championship meeting, but they did introduce a very important innovation. Unlike the AAA Championships in London, which were open to the whole world, the West of Scotland AAA championships were open only to those who had been born in Scotland, or who had lived there for the previous three months.

The rival Scottish AAA championship at Powderhall the following week was much more popular, and in every event except the high jump, the standard of performance was also a little higher. Their only qualification for entry was that competitors should be members of affiliated clubs. Over the winter negotiations proceeded and by March 1884 the two rival associations were ready to agree terms. The championship would be held alternately in the East and the West, the organising committee would have three delegates from each district, the President and the vice-President should be drawn from opposite districts, and they would retain the condition that entry was open only to those who were born in or lived in Scotland. The residential qualification was increased to six months in 1912, to two years in 1961, and in 2002 it was increased to three years.

The first Scottish AAA championship was held at Powderhall Grounds, Edinburgh, on Saturday 23 June 1883 and they have, with very few exceptions, always subsequently been held on a Saturday in June. In 1931 when it became necessary for there to be sufficient number of preliminary heats for the tournament to spread over two days, these heats and the longest track race were held on the Friday evening before the main championship. The 10 miles championship, which started in 1886, has always been held separately, but that first year they followed the English model from the AAA championship and had it on the Monday following the track events. That did not prove popular and they soon moved it to April.

The Scottish Cross Country Union was formed in 1886 and they held their first national championship at Lanark in March of that year. The Scottish Women’s Amateur Athletic Association was formed in 1930 and held their first national championships in 1931. In October 1992 the Scottish Amateur Athletic Association, the Scottish Women’s Amateur Athletic Association and the Scottish Cross Country Union merged into one overall governing body for the sport in Scotland known as the Scottish Athletics Federation, and this was in turn succeeded by Scottish Athletics on 1 April 2001.

International athletics began in 1895 with a match against Ireland. This became an annual fixture repeated every year until 1913, then in 1914 England were invited and it became a triangular match which continued until 1952. Between 1967 and 1975 the four home nations, England, Scotland, Wales, and Northern Ireland, contested a British Isles Cup although this was not held every year. From 1960 Scotland also had international matches against Holland, Belgium, Iceland, Denmark, Norway and various others. The first junior international was held in 1978 against England, Wales, and Northern Ireland.The first Scottish athlete to win a medal in the Olympic Games was Arthur Robertson, a member of Birchfield Harriers who had been born in Sheffield, but his father John, a doctor, had been born in Dalziel, near Motherwell. The first Scottish woman to win an Olympic medal was Linsey MacDonald, who won a bronze medal for the 4 x 400 metres relay in Moscow in 1980.

From the beginning there was only one category of record, which only required the performance to have been achieved in Scotland. These are now referred to as Scottish All-comers records. In 1888 it was established that athletes needed to submit a claim to have their record ratified, and from 1893 records were divided into two categories. The actual names of and qualification for these categories changed over the years, but the essential feature of them all was the distinction being made between records achieved by a Scottish athlete, and records achieved by athletes from anywhere in the world. All these records had to be set in Scotland itself. To determine who counted as a Scottish athlete, they defaulted to qualification for the championship, and this remained the case until 1932.

In 1933 Scottish AAA introduced the Scottish Native Record, which replaced the championship qualification, so that from that date there were Scottish Native Record, and Scottish All-comers Record. In 1961 they changed the name of the Native record to National record, and in 1964 they first distinguished between records set inside Scotland and those set elsewhere in the world, maintaining initially two lists of these records. This did not work very well, so at the AGM of 21 December 1968 they re-introduced the Native record to give the following three records:

Scottish National Record: Performance made anywhere in the world by an athlete who was born in Scotland, or who has one or more parents who were born in Scotland, or who is qualified through residence in Scotland, and has not made themselves ineligible to represent Scotland in international competition.

Scottish Native Record: Performance made in Scotland, by an athlete who was born in Scotland, or who has one or more parents who were born in Scotland, or is qualified through residence in Scotland, and has not made themselves ineligible to represent Scotland in international competition.

Scottish All-comers Record: Performance made in Scotland, by an athlete from anywhere in the world.

Scottish Athletics has a small staff of volunteers who deal with approximately 14,000 members in approximately 170 clubs of varying size from those with several hundred members to specialist clubs and those for minority interests to accommodate all areas of athletics within Scotland.

== Governance ==
Scottish Athletics is a Limited Company (SC217377), with no Share Capital. Its membership is primarily affiliated athletics clubs in Scotland and members, but may also include schools, companies and associate members. Only clubs, schools and associated members may vote at the AGM, through mandated delegates. The Chief Executive is Colin Hutchinson.

The Board of Directors oversees the operation of the company. The President is Ron Morrison. The role of chairman has been held by David Ovens since September 2021.

=== Commissions ===
Formal commissions oversee the day-to-day operation of specific areas, including the operation of certain championships and series, team selection and development of officials.

- Hill running Commission
- Officials Commission
- Road and Cross country running Commission
- Track and Field Commission

== See also ==
- Scottish Athletics Championships
- Sport in Scotland
- sportscotland
- UK Athletics
