= 1917 in art =

Events from the year 1917 in art.

== Events ==
- January – A drunken Amedeo Modigliani is ejected from a party for Georges Braque, by the hostess, Marie Vassilieff.
- January 29 – Rodin marries his mistress, Rose Beuret; she dies two weeks later.
- Eric Kennington, William Orpen, C. R. W. Nevinson, Paul Nash and William Rothenstein are sent as war artists to the Western Front from England. Frederick Farrell, uniquely, is sent by Glasgow, the only British city to sponsor a painter.
- De Stijl artistic movement is established by Theo van Doesburg.
- The Allen Memorial Art Museum is established at Oberlin College in Ohio.
- The Marc Chagall illustrated version of The Magician (דער קונצענמאכער, Der Kuntsenmakher) by I. L. Peretz (d. 1915) is published in Vilnius.

== Works ==
The Territorials at Pozières by William Barnes Wollen

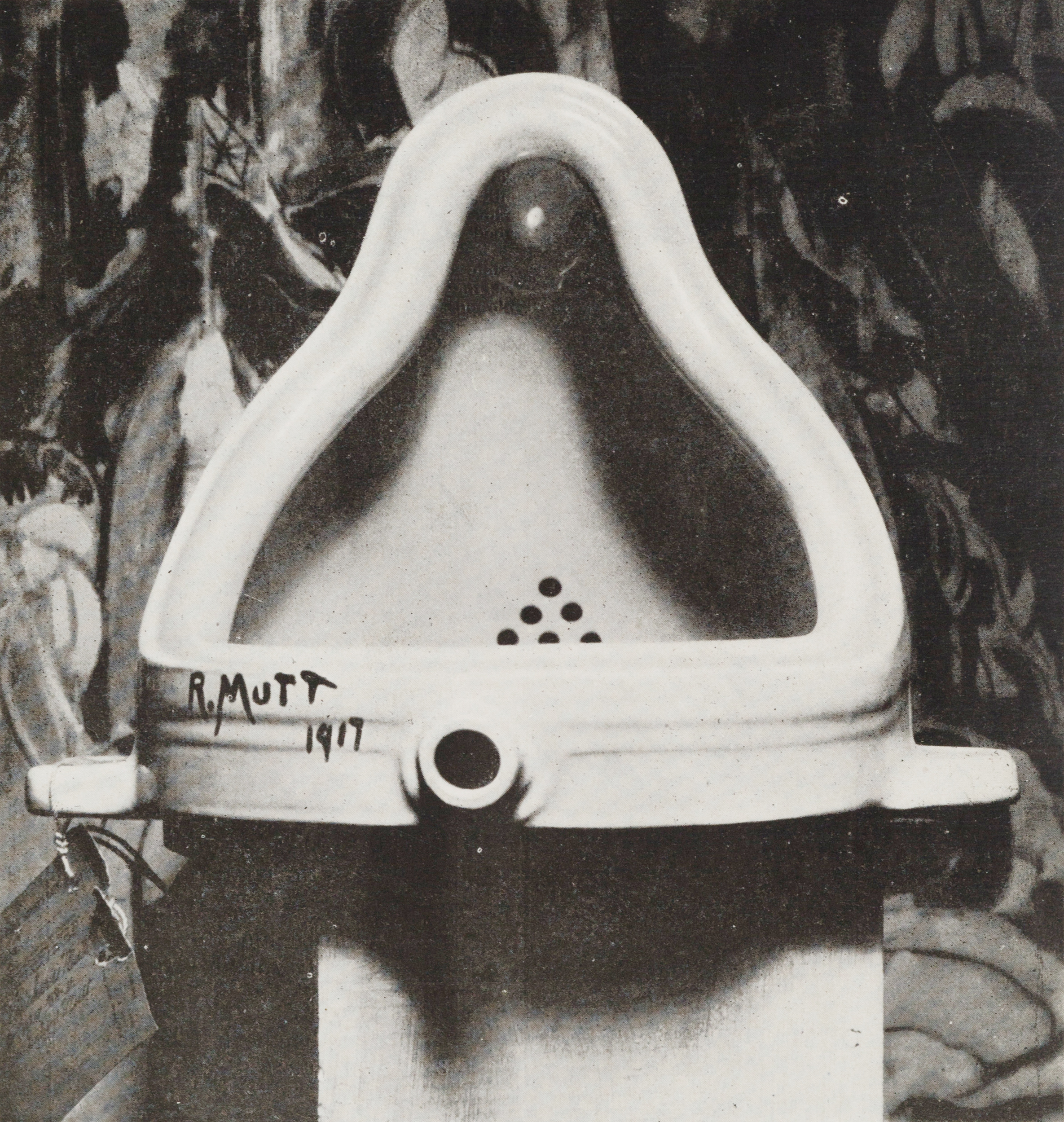
The original Fountain photographed by Alfred Stieglitz at the 291 after the 1917 Society of Independent Artists exhibit to which Duchamp submitted it.

- Max Beckmann
  - Descent from the Cross
  - Self-Portrait with Red Scarf
- Marc Chagall – Bella with White Collar
- Giorgio de Chirico
  - Great Metaphysical Interior
  - The Grand Metaphysician (Il grande metafisico)
- Lovis Corinth – Portrait of Julius Meier-Graefe
- Heinrich Maria Davringhausen – The Poet Däubler
- Theo van Doesburg – Card Players
- Marcel Duchamp
  - Fountain (readymade)
  - Tulip Hysteria Co-ordinating (fictitious work)
- Jacob Epstein – An American Soldier (bust)
- Daniel Chester French – Lafayette Memorial
- Elsa von Freytag-Loringhoven – God (readymade sculpture)
- J. W. Godward
  - The Fruit Vendor
  - A Lily Pond
  - Under The Blossom That Hangs On The Bough
- George Grosz
  - Explosion
  - Metropolis
- Rudolf Alfred Höger – Nach dem Vorstoß, Russische Kriegsgefangene (After the Foray: Russian Prisoners of War)
- Paul Klee – Ab ovo
- Gustav Klimt
  - Portrait of Fräulein Lieser
  - Portrait of a Lady
- Isidore Konti – Nymph and Fawn (bronze fountain)
- Boris Kustodiev – Portrait of Countess Grabowska
- Hans Larwin – Soldat und Tod
- Fernand Léger – Soldiers Playing Cards
- L. S. Lowry – Coming from the Mill (drawing)
- Maximilien Luce
  - The Execution of Varlin
  - La Gare de l'Est in snow
- George Luks – Houston Street
- Henri Matisse
  - Aicha and Laurette
  - Bathers by a River
  - The Music Lesson
  - The Painter and His Model
- Joan Miró
  - Portrait of Vincent Nubiola
  - Prades, the Village
- Amedeo Modigliani
  - Anna Zborowska
  - Jeanne Hébuterne with Hat and Necklace
  - Nu couché
  - Nude on a Blue Cushion
  - Nude Sitting on a Divan
  - Portrait of Blaise Cendrars
  - Reclining Nude
  - Reclining Nude (On the Left Side)
- C. R. W. Nevinson
  - Loading Timber at Southampton Docks
  - After a Push
  - Britain's Efforts and Ideals series of lithographs
  - A Group of Soldiers
  - A Howitzer Gun in Elevation
  - Over the Lines
  - Paths of Glory
  - The Road from Arras to Bapaume
  - Swooping Down on a Hostile Plane
  - A Tank
- Hilda Rix Nicholas – Desolation (approximate date; destroyed)
- Georgia O'Keeffe – Light Coming on the Plains (watercolor series)
- William Orpen
  - An Airman – Lieutenant R.T.C. Hoidge MC
  - Blown Up, Mad
  - Field-Marshal Sir Douglas Haig
  - German 'Planes Visiting Cassel
  - A Highlander Passing a Grave
  - Ready to Start: Self Portrait
  - Schwaben Redoubt
  - Self-portrait
  - Theipval
  - The Thinker on the Butte de Warlencourt (original pencil & watercolour version)
  - View from the Old British Trenches, Looking towards La Boisselle, Courcelette on the Left, Martinpuich on the Right
- Glyn Philpot
  - Siegfried Sassoon
  - A Young Breton (Guillaume Rolland)
- Pablo Picasso – Harlequin with a Guitar
- Auguste Rodin – The Gates of Hell (sculpture unfinished at his death)
- John Singer Sargent – Portrait of Woodrow Wilson
- Egon Schiele
  - The Embrace
  - Seated Woman with Bent Knees
- Zinaida Serebriakova – Bleaching Cloth
- Charles Sheeler – Doylestown House – Stairs from Below (photograph)
- John French Sloan – Passing through Gloucester
- Alfred Stieglitz – The Last Days of 291 (photograph)
- Tom Thomson
  - April in Algonquin Park
  - The Jack Pine
  - The West Wind
- Félix Vallotton
  - The Church of Souain
  - Senegalese Soldiers at the camp of Mailly
- John William Waterhouse – Fair Rosamund
- Christopher Williams – The Red Dress
- William Barnes Wollen – The Territorials at Pozières

== Births ==
- 9 January – Virginia Surtees, English art historian and biographer (d. 2017)
- 5 February – Lucienne Day, née Conradi, British textile designer (d. 2010)
- 18 February – Tuulikki Pietilä, Finnish graphic artist (d. 2009)
- 20 February
  - Manny Farber, American painter and film critic (d. 2008)
  - Louisa Matthíasdóttir, Icelandic-American painter (d. 2000)
- 1 March – Tom Keating, English art restorer and art faker (d. 1984)
- 12 March – Milton Resnick, American painter (d. 2004)
- 24 March – Constantine Andreou, Greek painter and sculptor (d. 2007)
- 6 April – Leonora Carrington, English-born surrealist painter working in Mexico (d. 2011)
- 21 May – Frank Bellamy, English comics artist (d. 1976)
- 12 July – Andrew Wyeth, American painter (d. 2009)
- 14 July – Ben Enwonwu, Nigerian painter and sculptor (d. 1994)
- 11 August – Dik Browne, American cartoonist (d. 1989)
- 28 August – Jack Kirby, American comic book artist, writer and editor (d. 1994)
- 3 September – Anthony Robert Klitz, English artist (d. 2000)
- 7 September – Jacob Lawrence, African American painter (d. 2000)
- 11 September – Daniel Wildenstein, French international art dealer and scholar (d. 2001)
- 25 December – John Minton, English painter and illustrator (suicide 1957)

== Deaths ==
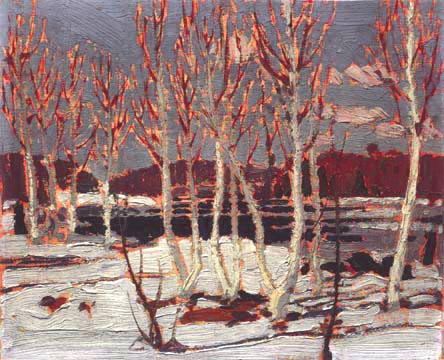
Tom Thomson – April in Algonquin Park

- January 15 – William De Morgan, English ceramic artist (b. 1839)
- January 21 – Francesca Alexander, American illustrator (b. 1837)
- February 10 – John William Waterhouse, Italian-born artist (b. 1849)
- February 17 – Carolus-Duran, French painter (b. 1837)
- March 27 – Moses Jacob Ezekiel, American sculptor working in Italy (b. 1844)
- March 28 – Albert Pinkham Ryder, American painter (b. 1847)
- April 23 – Robert Koehler, German American painter (b. 1850)
- June 30 – Antonio de La Gandara, French painter (b. 1861)
- July 3 – Basil Temple Blackwood, British book illustrator (b. 1870) (killed in action)
- July 8 – Tom Thomson, Canadian painter (b. 1877) (drowned during a canoeing trip on Canoe Lake in Algonquin Park)
- September 27 – Edgar Degas, French painter and sculptor (b. 1834)
- October 14 – Nathaniel Hone the Younger, Irish painter (b. 1831)
- October 23 – Eugène Grasset, Swiss artist (b. 1845)
- November 17
  - Sir Charles Holroyd, English etcher (b. 1861)
  - Auguste Rodin, French sculptor (b. 1840)
- December 21 – Wilhelm Trübner, German painter (b. 1851)
- (date unknown) – Raffaele Belliazzi, Italian sculptor (b. 1835)
