= 1879–80 Home Nations rugby union matches =

The 1879–80 Home Nations rugby union matches were a series of international rugby union friendlies held between the England, Ireland and Scotland national rugby union teams.

The only recognised competition held between the countries was the annual Calcutta Cup match, contested between England and Scotland. It was the second challenge for the Cup.

== Scoring system ==
The matches for this season were decided on goals scored. A goal was awarded for a successful conversion after a try, for a dropped goal or for a goal from mark. If a game was drawn, any unconverted tries were tallied to give a winner. If there was still no clear winner, the match was declared a draw.

== Matches ==
=== Ireland vs. England ===
2 February 1880

Ireland	1T – 1G 1T	England
Try: Cuppaidge		Try: Ellis; Markendale; Con: Stokes

Lansdowne Road, Ireland
Referee: GP Nugent (Ireland)

Ireland
RB Walkington (NIFC), AM Whitestone (Dublin University), JC Bagot (Dublin University), WT Heron (NIFC), M Johnston (Dublin University), AJ Forrest (Wanderers), F Kennedy (Wanderers), A Millar (Kingstown), HC Kelly (NIFC) capt., JW Taylor (NIFC), JA McDonald (Wanderers), JL Cuppaidge (Wanderers), RW Hughes (NIFC), G Scriven (Dublin University), HH Purdon (NIFC)

England
TW Fry (Queen's House), AN Hornby (Manchester), L Stokes (Blackheath) capt., R Hunt (Manchester), HT Twynam (Richmond), AH Jackson (Blackheath), S Neame (Old Cheltonians), Charles Gurdon (Richmond), B Kilner (Wakefield Trinity), GF Vernon (Blackheath), E Woodhead (Dublin University), SS Ellis (Queen's House), HC Rowley (Manchester), E Markendale (Manchester Rangers), JW Schofield (Manchester Rangers)

=== Scotland vs. Ireland ===
14 February 1880

Scotland	1G 2DG 1T – nil	Ireland
Try: Ewart (2); Masters; Cons: Cross; Drop: Finlay (2)

Hamilton Crescent, Glasgow
Referee: A Buchanan (Scotland)

Scotland
Bill Maclagan (Edinburgh Academical), Malcolm Cross (Glasgow Academical), Ninian Finlay (Edinburgh Academical), WH Masters (Edinburgh Inst. F.P.), WS Brown (Edinburgh Inst. F.P.), Robert Ainslie (Edinburgh Inst. F.P.), CAR Stewart (West of Scotland), JB Brown (Glasgow Academical), EN Ewart (Glasgow Academical), RW Irvine (Edinburgh Academical) capt., AG Petrie (Royal HSFP), JHS Graham (Edinburgh Academical), D McCowan (West of Scotland), NT Brewis (Edinburgh Inst. F.P.), John Guthrie Tait (Edinburgh Academical)

Ireland
RB Walkington (NIFC), T Harrison (Queen's College, Cork), JC Bagot (Dublin University), WT Heron (NIFC), M Johnston (Dublin University), AJ Forrest (Wanderers), AP Cronyn, A Millar (Kingstown), HC Kelly (NIFC) capt., JW Taylor (NIFC), WL Finlay (NIFC), JL Cuppaidge (Wanderers), RW Hughes (NIFC), G Scriven (Dublin University), WA Wallis (Dublin University)

=== England vs. Scotland ===
28 February 1880

England	2G 3T – 1G	Scotland
Try: Burton; Fry; Gurdon; Taylor (2); Con: Stokes (2)		Try: Brown; Con: Cross

Whalley Range, Manchester
Referee: A. G. Guillemard (England)

England
TW Fry (Queen's House), C. M. Sawyer (Broughton), L Stokes (Blackheath) capt., RT Finch (Cambridge University), HH Taylor (St. George's Hospital), CH Coates (Cambridge University), S Neame (Old Cheltonians), Charles Gurdon (Richmond), C Phillips (Oxford University), GF Vernon (Blackheath), G Harrison (Hull), George Burton (Blackheath), HC Rowley (Manchester), ET Gurdon (Richmond), Roger Walker (Manchester)

Scotland
Bill Maclagan (Edinburgh Academical), Malcolm Cross (Glasgow Academical), Ninian Finlay (Edinburgh Academical), WH Masters (Edinburgh Inst. F.P.), WS Brown (Edinburgh Inst. F.P.), Robert Ainslie (Edinburgh Inst. F.P.), CAR Stewart (West of Scotland), JB Brown (Glasgow Academical), EN Ewart (Glasgow Academical), RW Irvine (Edinburgh Academical) capt., AG Petrie (Royal HSFP), JHS Graham (Edinburgh Academical), D McCowan (West of Scotland), NT Brewis (Edinburgh Inst. F.P.), DY Cassels (West of Scotland)

== Bibliography ==
- Griffiths, John (1987). The Phoenix Book of International Rugby Records. London: Phoenix House. ISBN 0-460-07003-7.
