= Roger Walker (rugby union) =

England international rugby union footballer and cricketer

- Born: Henry Arnold Lawrence; 18 September 1846 Bury. England
- Died: 11 November 1919 (aged 73) Reading, England

Rugby union career
- Position: Forward
Senior career
Years	Team	Apps	(Points)
- Manchester Rugby Club
International career
Years	Team	Apps	(Points)
1874-1880	England	5	(0)

Roger Walker (18 September 1846 – 11 November 1919) was a rugby union forward who played club rugby for Manchester Rugby Club and international rugby for England. Walker later became the President of the Rugby Football Union, and in that role accompanied the British Isles team on their 1896 tour of South Africa.

Walker was also a notable cricketer, playing in two first-class matches for Lancashire.

== Rugby career ==
Walker came to note as a rugby player during the early history of the sport, playing club rugby for Manchester. In 1874, Walker was selected to play for the England national team, in a game against Scotland, only the fourth international rugby game to be played. In the days before forward positional play, Walker was classed simply as a forward, as part of the twenty man team. England won 1-0, thanks to a dropped goal from Freeman. The next year, Walker was back in the England team, this time in the very first international match for Ireland. Played at the Kensington Oval in London, England won two - nil. Walker played in three more international, all against Scotland, in 1876, 1879 and 1880. England won the 1876 encounter, drew the 1879 game, which was the first contest for the Calcutta Cup; and won the 1880 match. Walker finished his international career with four wins, a draw and no losses.

With his international career behind him, Walker continued his association with the sport of rugby by becoming the President of the Rugby Football Union, the national union of rugby in England. In 1896 he travelled with the British Isles, in the role as team manager. The tour, the second undertaken in South Africa, was a success for the tourists, winning three of the four Test matches against the South African national team. In 1898, Walker was central in creating Reading R.F.C., along with G Rowland-Hill and G.R. Joyce.

== Cricket career ==
Walker played club cricket for several cricket teams between 1864 and 1901, including Gentlemen of Lancashire, Manchester Cricket Club, Bury Cricket Club and Marylebone Cricket Club. He played in two first-class cricket matches, both for Lancashire, against Darbyshire in 1874 and Marylebone in 1875. A right-handed batsman, Walker ended his first-class career with 27 runs from four innings, and as a wicket-keeper in the field he did not record any bowling figures.

== "The Rugby Match" ==
In William Barnes Wollen's painting "The Rugby Match", featuring Yorkshire's 11-3 victory over Lancashire during the 1893/94 season, a painting that is now held at the Rugby Football Union headquarters in the Twickenham Stadium, Alf Barraclough can be seen being tackled, and passing the ball to Jack Toothill, with Tommy Dobson on the outside, Roger Walker can be seen in the crowd, he is the seventh person to the right of Tommy Dobson's head.
