= Barron Kilner =

English rugby union player and administrator

- Full name: Barron Kilner
- Born: 11 October 1852 Thornhill Lees, England
- Died: 28 December 1922 (aged 70) Wakefield, England

Rugby union career
- Position: Forwards
Senior career
Years	Team	Apps	(Points)
- Wakefield Trinity
- Yorkshire
International career
Years	Team	Apps	(Points)
1884	England	1	(0)

Barron Kilner (11 October 1852 – 28 December 1922) was an English rugby union footballer who played in the 1880s, and rugby union administrator of the 1890s. He played at representative level for England, and Yorkshire, and at club level for Wakefield Trinity (were a rugby union club at the time), as a forward, e.g. front row, lock, or back row. Prior to 27 August 1895, Wakefield Trinity was a rugby union club. Barron Kilner was also Mayor of Wakefield in 1899.

== Background ==
Barron Kilner was born in Thornhill Lees, West Riding of Yorkshire, and he died aged 70 in Wakefield, West Riding of Yorkshire.

== Playing career ==
=== International honours ===
Barron Kilner won a cap for England while at Wakefield Trinity in the 1879–80 Home Nations rugby union match against Ireland.

=== County honours ===
Kilner represented Yorkshire while at Wakefield Trinity.

== "The Rugby Match" ==
Kilner can be seen in the crowd of William Barnes Wollen's painting "The Rugby Match", which features Yorkshire's 11–3 victory over Lancashire during the 1893/94 season and is now held at the Rugby Football Union headquarters at Twickenham Stadium. Alf Barraclough is shown being tackled, and passing the ball to Jack Toothill, with Tommy Dobson on the outside. Kilner is the first person in the crowd to the right of Dobson's head.
