= John Schofield (disambiguation) =

John Schofield (1831–1906) was an American soldier and general.

John Schofield may also refer to:

- John Schofield (footballer) (born 1965), English football manager
- John Schofield (VC) (1892–1918), English recipient of the Victoria Cross
- John Schofield (rugby union), English international rugby union player
- Ducky Schofield (John Richard Schofield, 1935–2022), American baseball player
- Johnny Schofield (John Reginald Schofield, 1931–2006), English footballer
- Johnnie Schofield (John William Schofield, 1889–1955), British actor
- Jack Schofield (footballer) (John Schofield, fl. 1931–36), English footballer

== See also ==
- John Scofield (born 1951), American musician
- Jack Schofield (disambiguation)
