= The Battle of the Roses =

1895 painting by William Barnes Wollen

- The Rugby Match, The Roses Match
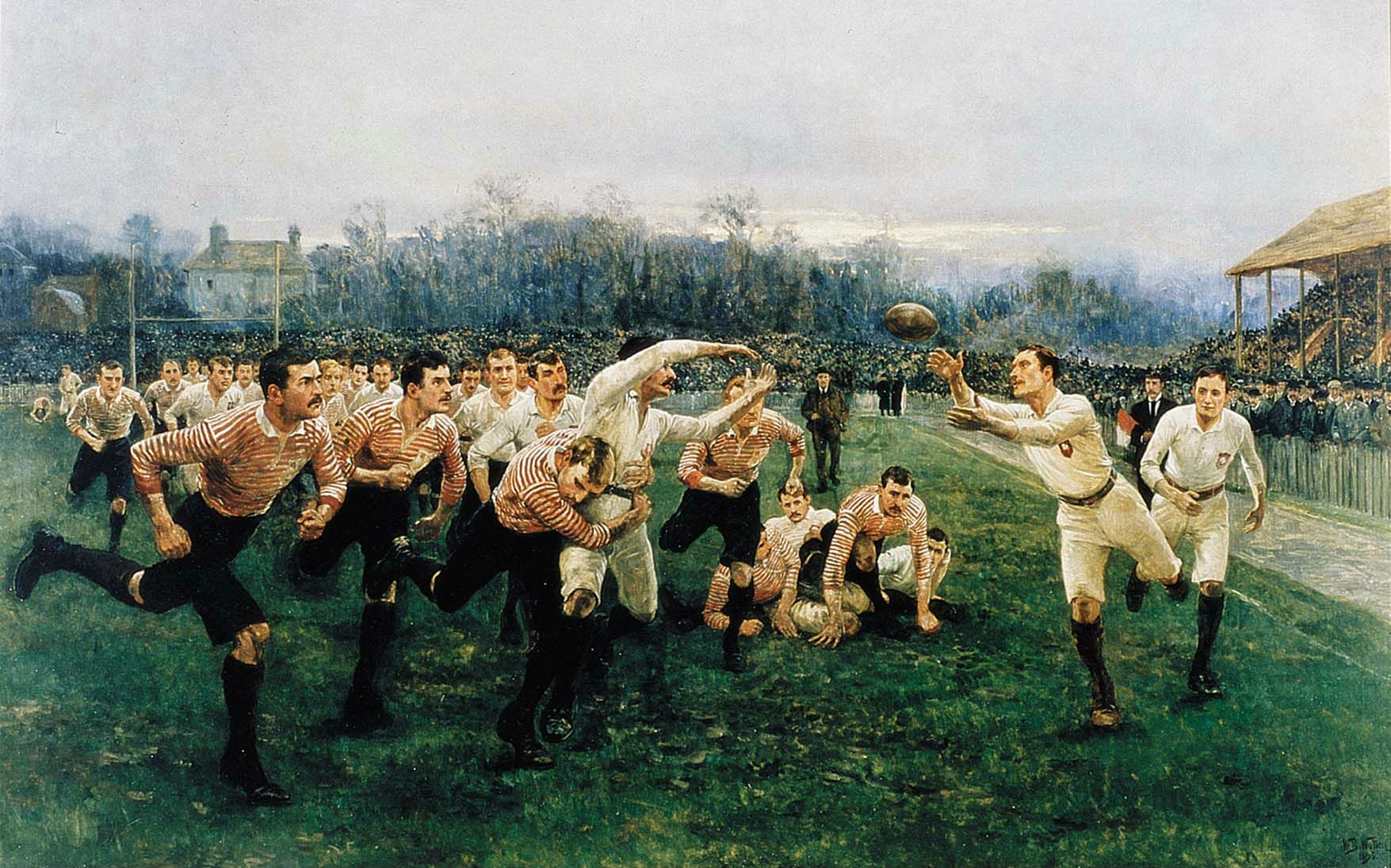
- Artist: William Barnes Wollen
- Year: 1895
- Location: Twickenham Stadium, Twickenham, Greater London, England
- Owner: Yorkshire Rugby Football Union

The Battle of the Roses also known as The Rugby Match or The Roses Match is an 1895 portrait by artist William Barnes Wollen. It is based on the rugby union match between the representative sides of Yorkshire and Lancashire played at Fallowfield, Manchester on 24 November 1894. It depicts the Yorkshire team in the all-white strip attacking while the Lancashire team in the hooped red and white jerseys and black shorts try to prevent a pass being made. The action on the pitch takes place in front of a packed stadium.

== History ==
The painting was commissioned by Newcastle-on-Tyne based partnership of Mawson, Swan & Morgan and it was completed by Wollen in 1895 and was exhibited at the 1896 Royal Academy Summer Exhibition (catalogue number 673). Many of the players sat specially for Wollen while other players were based on previous portraits of them. It was one of the pieces selected to appear in Cassell's Royal Academy Pictures 1896 edition. Subsequent to the Royal Academy exhibition the portrait is known to have been on display in West Yorkshire and Newcastle in 1896–1898 but the subsequent whereabouts of the portrait are unknown until 1957 when members of the Yorkshire Rugby Football Union found the portrait in a second-hand shop in Newcastle. They bought the picture for £25 and it was displayed in the Otley R.U.F.C. clubhouse until the 1960s when it was moved to its current location in the West stand at Twickenham Stadium.

== Ghost legend ==
The picture was cleaned and restored by specialist Denis Bynon. Examined under a specific light showed overpaint on the picture at this time to show that at least one player who has subsequently been overpainted from the picture. One suggestion made was that Wollen painted out players who, in 1895, took part in the schism of rugby and left rugby union to join the Northern Rugby Football Union (later to become the Rugby Football League). The story of these ghosts took root and was repeated as the truth on TV and in the press until it was pointed out that had Wollen painted out all the players who moved codes that there would only be a couple of players left in the picture. Other suggestions are that the painter forgot to include the referee in the original and simply chose to replace one of the players with the referee figure or that the players were expected to make a financial donation to appear in the picture and the one who didn't pay up was removed from the final portrait. None of these suggestions has ever been substantiated and Wollen's motives for the changes are unknown.

== Accuracy and 2020 reappraisal ==
Until 2020 historians, including rugby specialist Tony Collins, considered that the picture featured the rugby union match between the representative sides of Yorkshire and Lancashire played at Park Avenue, Bradford on 25 November 1893 but noted that at least 11 of the players in the picture have been identified as taking part in the 1893 match but others who have been identified didn't, most notably Alf Barraclough, the player making the pass, and Thomas Dobson, the rightmost player in the picture. The referee in the picture has been identified as George Rowland Hill then the secretary of the Rugby Football Union but the actual referee of the game was T Potts from Durham.

With the greater availability of contemporary newspapers for study Collins is now of the opinion that the painting is based on the game between the two counties at Fallowfield stadium, Manchester on 24 November 1894. A review of the painting while it was on public display in Huddersfield in 1896 gives a full description of the painting identifying many of the players illustrated, the match, location and the identity of many rugby officials who appear in the crowd. One remaining discrepancy is the referee as match reports record the referee as Irish referee, R. G. Warren.
