= QHFC =

QHFC may refer to:

- Qingdao Hainiu F.C., a Chinese football club
- Qingdao F.C., a Chinese football club under the name "Qingdao Hainiu F.C." between 2013 and 2015
- Queen's House Football Club, a 19th-century English rugby football club
