= Jack Schofield =

Jack Schofield may refer to:

- Jack Schofield (footballer), English footballer
- Jack Lund Schofield (1923–2015), American politician, educator and businessman
- Jack Schofield (journalist), British technology journalist
