= Alf Barraclough =

English rugby union & league footballer

Personal information
- Full name: Alfred Barraclough
- Born: unknown
- Died: unknown

Playing information

Rugby union
Club
Years	Team	Pld	T	G	FG	P
≤1893–95	Manningham FC
Representative
Years	Team	Pld	T	G	FG	P
≤1893/94–≥93/94	Yorkshire	≥1

Rugby league
Club
Years	Team	Pld	T	G	FG	P
1895–≥96	Manningham FC
Representative
Years	Team	Pld	T	G	FG	P
1895	Yorkshire	1	0	0	0	0

Alfred "Alf" Barraclough (birth unknown – death unknown) was an English rugby union, and professional rugby league footballer who played in the 1890s. He played representative level rugby union (RU) for Yorkshire, and at club level for Manningham FC (captain), and representative level rugby league (RL) for Yorkshire, and at club level for Manningham FC. Prior to Tuesday 27 August 1895, Manningham was a rugby union club, it then became a rugby league club, and since Friday 29 May 1903 it has been the association football (soccer) club Bradford City.

== Playing career ==
=== County honours ===
Alf Barraclough won cap(s) for Yorkshire while at Manningham, in William Barnes Wollen's painting The Rugby Match, featuring Yorkshire's 11–3 victory over Lancashire during the 1893/94 season, a painting that is now held at the Rugby Football Union headquarters in the Twickenham Stadium, Alf Barraclough can be seen being tackled, and passing the ball to Jack Toothill, with Tommy Dobson on the outside, although Tommy Dobson did not actually participate in this particular match.

=== Championship appearances ===
Alf Barraclough was the captain in Manningham FC's Championship victory during the 1895–96 season.

== Change of Code ==
Manningham converted from the rugby union code to the rugby league code on 27 August 1895, consequently, he was both a rugby union and rugby league footballer for Manningham.
