= Reclining Nude =

Reclining Nude may refer to:

- Nu couché, also known in English as Reclining Nude, a 1917 painting by Amedeo Modigliani
- Reclining Nude (Amedeo Modigliani), a different 1917 painting by Amedeo Modigliani
- Reclining Nude (1933), a 1933 painting by Amrita Sher-Gil
