= Walter Hewitt =

- Full name: Walter William Hewitt
- Born: 1854 Deptford, Kent, England
- Died: 6 January 1910 (aged 55) Greenwich, London, England

Rugby union career
- Position: Forward
Amateur team(s)
Years	Team	Apps	(Points)
–	Queen's House Football Club		
International career
Years	Team	Apps	(Points)
1881–82	England	4	(0)

Walter William Hewitt (1854 – 1910) was an English international rugby union player.

A native of London, Hewitt played much of his rugby with Queen's House, where teammates included his brothers Cameron and Malcolm. He also played for Blackheath and was capped four times as a forward for England, with three international appearances in 1881 and one more the following year.

Hewitt was also notable as an oarsman, rowing for the London Rowing Club. He won the Thames Challenge Cup in 1877 and was in the Grand Challenge Cup–winning eights crew on three occasions.

== See also ==
- List of England national rugby union players
