= The Music Lesson (Matisse) =

1917 painting by Henri Matisse

- Artist: Henri Matisse
- Year: 1917
- Medium: Oil on canvas
- Dimensions: 245.1 cm × 210.8 cm (96.5 in × 83.0 in)
- Location: The Barnes Foundation; Philadelphia

The Music Lesson (French: La leçon de musique) is a 1917 oil painting by Henri Matisse. It is on display at the Barnes Foundation in Philadelphia, Pennsylvania.

This work is a family portrait depicting the artist's relatives around a Pleyel piano and a window in Issy-les-Moulineaux. The theme is a much more naturalistic recreation of The Piano Lesson, created the previous year in large colored sections, which is now at the Museum of Modern Art, in New York.

== See also ==
- List of works by Henri Matisse
