= Metropolis (Grosz) =

Painting by George Grosz

- Artist: George Grosz
- Year: 1916–1917
- Medium: Oil on canvas
- Dimensions: 100 cm × 102 cm (39 in × 40 in)
- Location: Thyssen-Bornemisza Museum; Madrid

Metropolis is an oil on canvas painting by the German artist George Grosz, executed in 1916–1917. It belongs to the collection of the Thyssen-Bornemisza Museum in Madrid.

== Description ==
The growth of cities into gigantic metropolises was one of the favorite themes of the early 20th century artists. Seeking to capture this change, Grosz portrays Berlin in the midst of World War I in his Expressionist style with a predominance of red in a very chaotic scene. In the construction of the scene, he uses the techniques of cubism and futurism, with an exaggerated perspective and superposition of figures, that convey the feverish rhythm of city life. But in contrast to the positive outlook of other artists, the artist's personal experience of the front-line gave his work an apocalyptic dimension, revealing the insanity of man and the desire for self-destruction.

== History ==
When the Nazis reached power, they banned modern art, so Grosz was one of the artists outlawed as degenerate. The current painting was shown at the exhibition of Degenerate Art in 1937. Shortly thereafter, it was among the works sold by the Nazi regime in the Fischer Gallery in Lucerne, as part of fund-raising for the rearmament program. Then it was bought by the German dealer Kurt Valentin, who emigrated to New York, where he opened the Buchholz Gallery. Thus, Metropolis ended in the United States, which had become the new homeland of Grosz in 1933. He bought this iconic work as soon he was able to improve his financial situation. The painting belonged also to Richard L. Feigen for some time, after which it ended in the Thyssen-Bornemisza collection.
