= Seated Woman with Bent Knees =

1917 drawing by Egon Schiele

- Sitzende Frau mit angezogenem Knie (German)
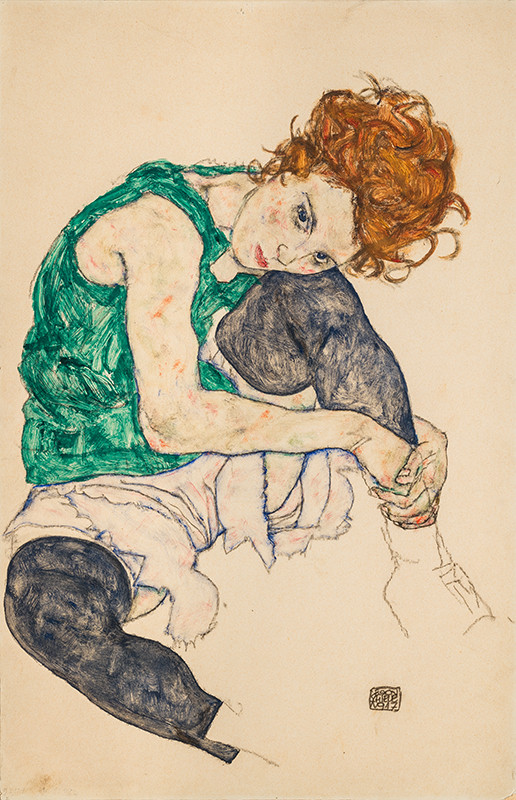
- Artist: Egon Schiele
- Year: 1917
- Medium: Gouache, watercolor, and black crayon on paper
- Dimensions: 46 cm × 30.5 cm (18 in × 12 in)
- Location: National Gallery; Prague

Seated Woman with Bent Knees (Note: A plural Knees title is used by the piece's official entry on the National Gallery Prague's website, although the piece is also referred to as Seated Woman with Bent Knee and Seated Woman with Left Leg Drawn up.) is a 1917 painting in gouache, watercolor, and black crayon on paper by the Austrian Expressionist artist Egon Schiele.

As its name suggests, the piece features a woman, depicted in a seated pose. Schiele's wife, Edith, served as the model for Seated Woman, which utilizes a limited color palette, empty background, and sharp, edgy lines.

Like many of Schiele's other works, the piece employs a distinct style that subverts conventional representations of beauty and instead blends an ugly, distorted feeling with a sensual and erotic aesthetic. The piece is in the National Gallery Prague, Czech Republic.

== Background ==
In 1907, Schiele began attending the Academy of Fine Arts in Vienna. While there, he came in contact with Gustav Klimt, who would become Schiele's mentor, introducing him to patrons, models, and the work of other artists. Schiele formed the New Art Group in 1909, and in 1910, began experimenting with nude works for which he became known. His works characteristically displayed an "overt, raw, and disturbing sexuality". Blatant eroticism, for which he drew a high amount of contemporary criticism, was featured in tandem with twisted human anatomy and jagged lines.

In 1915, Schiele married Edith (née Harms). From this time until his death in 1918, Edith and her sister Adèle modeled for Schiele's works. Representing his maturity as an artist during this 1915–1918 period, Schiele began implementing inflected lines and a naturalistic approach to the human figure.

== Composition and description ==
Schiele's 1917 Seated Woman piece portrays a young female figure, modeled after Edith. Depicted as sitting on the ground, the figure assumes an informal and provocative pose. Although in a relaxed pose and at ease, Schiele's model has also been conversely described as "charged with a nervous energy", and the piece has been described as having an "aggressiveness". The figure rests her head on her knee, which is raised and bent, while her other leg falls open to the side. She has carmine-red lips and sports messy, fiery orange-red hair that contrasts with the deep green of her top, and her petticoat is hitched up. She also wears underwear and black stockings. Stockings would not be an uncommon fetishistic attribute found in Schiele's work. She also makes a direct and suggestive eye contact with viewers of the work.

Seated Woman employed a gouache, watercolor, and black crayon technique on paper. The subject's hair, skin, and clothing have a mottled appearance due to Schiele's long, visible, and apparently rapidly applied brushstrokes. Schiele's incorporation of "an expressive tonality and the visible strokes done with gouache" help complete the visual presence of Seated Woman. The expressiveness of the piece's lines and marks were achieved by Schiele's application of "fairly dry, scumbled paint" and usage of "stiff brushes and different amounts of water in each area". The figure's hair, for example, was painted with a more fluid paint than her stockings. Sharp angles are also present in the piece.

The background completely forms an empty, or negative space around the subject. This was typical for the subjects in Schiele's art, which were often found "suspended in a void, with no background to indicate depth beyond the edges of the figure itself". Meanwhile, the palette is limited to cream, white, black, green, red, and orange.

== Analysis and provenance ==
Schiele's work came to be categorized as part of the Austrian Expressionism movement, which rejected conventional portrayals of beauty and instead predicated its pictorial language through elements of ugliness and exaggerated emotions. Schiele would be a major proponent of these features, "introducing the provocative concept of the novel combination of form and emotion."

In this vein, Schiele "studied and staged the poses of his models to the extent that ultimately he achieved a deformed and even grotesque effect", disrupting the dichotomy of beauty and ugliness. Seated Woman with Bent Knees follows suit. Instead of creating a "flattering, demure portrait" of Edith, the piece opts to depict its subject in a controversial, suggestive pose and create an unfinished feeling through the foreshortening and use of taut, edgy linework. While illustrative, Schiele's work on the piece conflicted with conventional painting styles.

The piece is in the National Gallery Prague's Collection of Prints and Drawings in Prague, Czech Republic.
