= Sidney Ellis =

England international rugby union player

- Born: Sidney Ellis; 13 March 1859 Lewisham, London, England
- Died: 1 December 1937 (aged 78) (registered in) Croydon
- School: Dulwich College

Rugby union career
- Position: Forward
Senior career
Years	Team	Apps	(Points)
- Queen's House Football Club
International career
Years	Team	Apps	(Points)
1880–1880	England	1	(Goals:0; Tries:1; Conv:0; Pens:0; Drop:0)

Sidney Ellis (1859–1937) was a rugby union international who represented England in 1880.

== Early life ==
Sidney Ellis was born on 13 March 1859 in Lewisham. He attended Dulwich College.

== Rugby union career ==
Ellis made his international debut on 2 February 1880 at Lansdowne Road in the Ireland vs England match which was won by England. This was the only test he played in.
