= The Territorials at Pozières =

Painting by William Barnes Wollen

- Artist: William Barnes Wollen
- Year: 1917
- Medium: Oil on canvas
- Dimensions: 285 cm × 416 cm (112.4 in × 163.8 in)
- Location: National Army Museum, London

The Territorials at Pozières is a 1917 oil painting by the British artist William Barnes Wollen. It depicts the fighting on the opening day Battle of Pozières on 23 July 1916, part of the wider Battle of the Somme. The 1st Australian Division launched an attack on the village of Pozières, supported by the British 145th Infantry Brigade Soldiers of the 145th, part of the British Territorial Army, are shown overrunning a German trench.

The painting was displayed at the Royal Academy Exhibition of 1917 held at Burlington House in London under title The London Territorials at Pozières. Today it forms part of the collection of the National Army Museum, having been acquired in 1957.

== Bibliography ==
- Wray, Christopher. Pozières: Echoes of a Distant Battle Cambridge University Press, 2015.
