= Reclining Nude (On the Left Side) =

1917 painting by Amedeo Modigliani

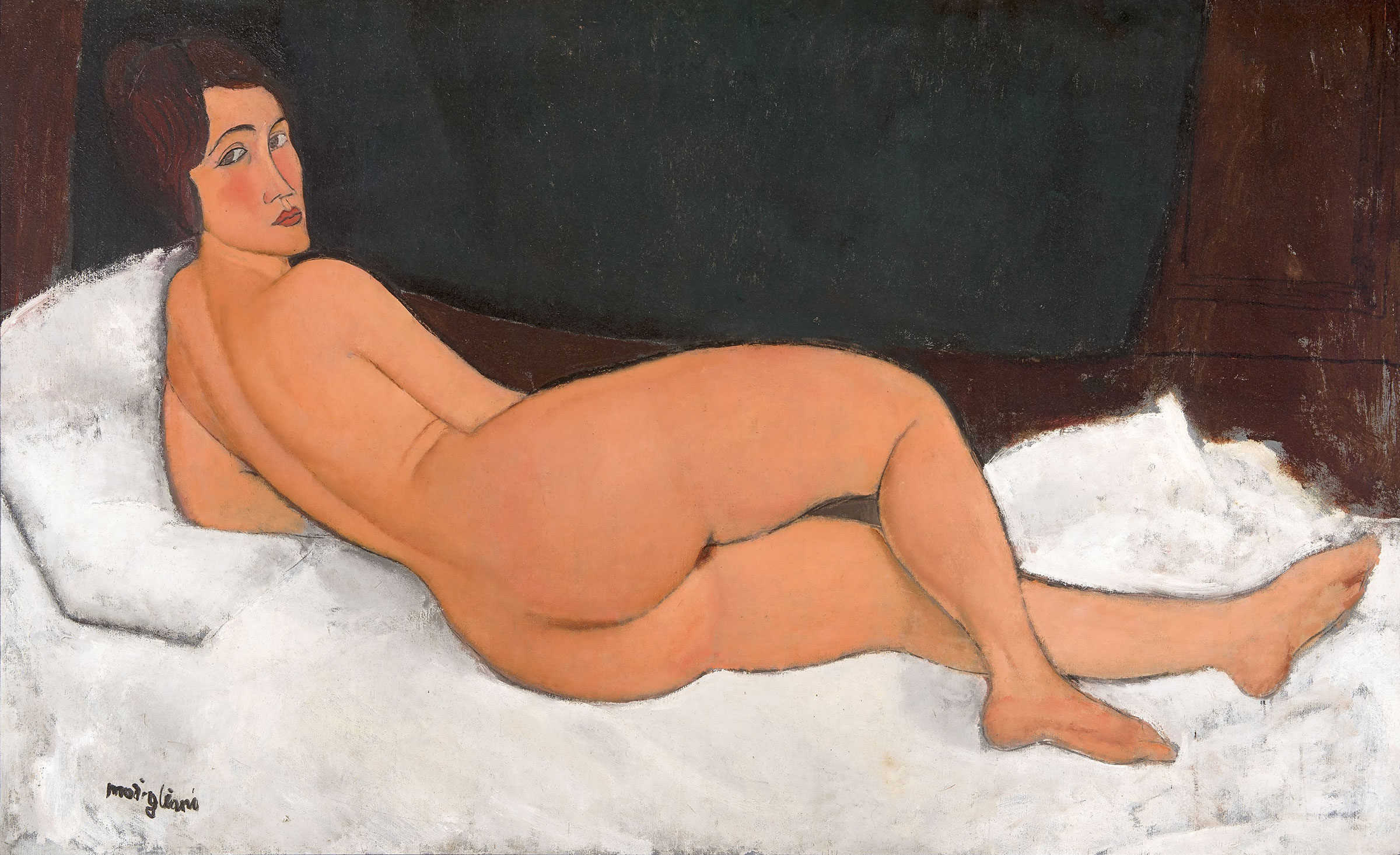
- Artist: Amedeo Modigliani
- Year: 1917
- Type: Oil paint on canvas
- Dimensions: 89 by 146 centimetres (35 in × 57 in)
- Location: Private collection

Reclining Nude (On the Left Side) (French: Nu couché (sur le côté gauche)) is a 1917 painting by Amedeo Modigliani. The painting was included in a 2017/2018 Tate Modern exhibition of Modigliani's works. The painting was sold by auction by Sotheby's in April 2018. Writing in The Guardian, British arts journalist Jonathan Jones compared it to Ingres' 1814 work Grande Odalisque.

The painting is currently valued at over $100 million and is considered to be one of the most famous portraits of women ever.
