= Harlequin with a Guitar =

Painting by Juan Gris

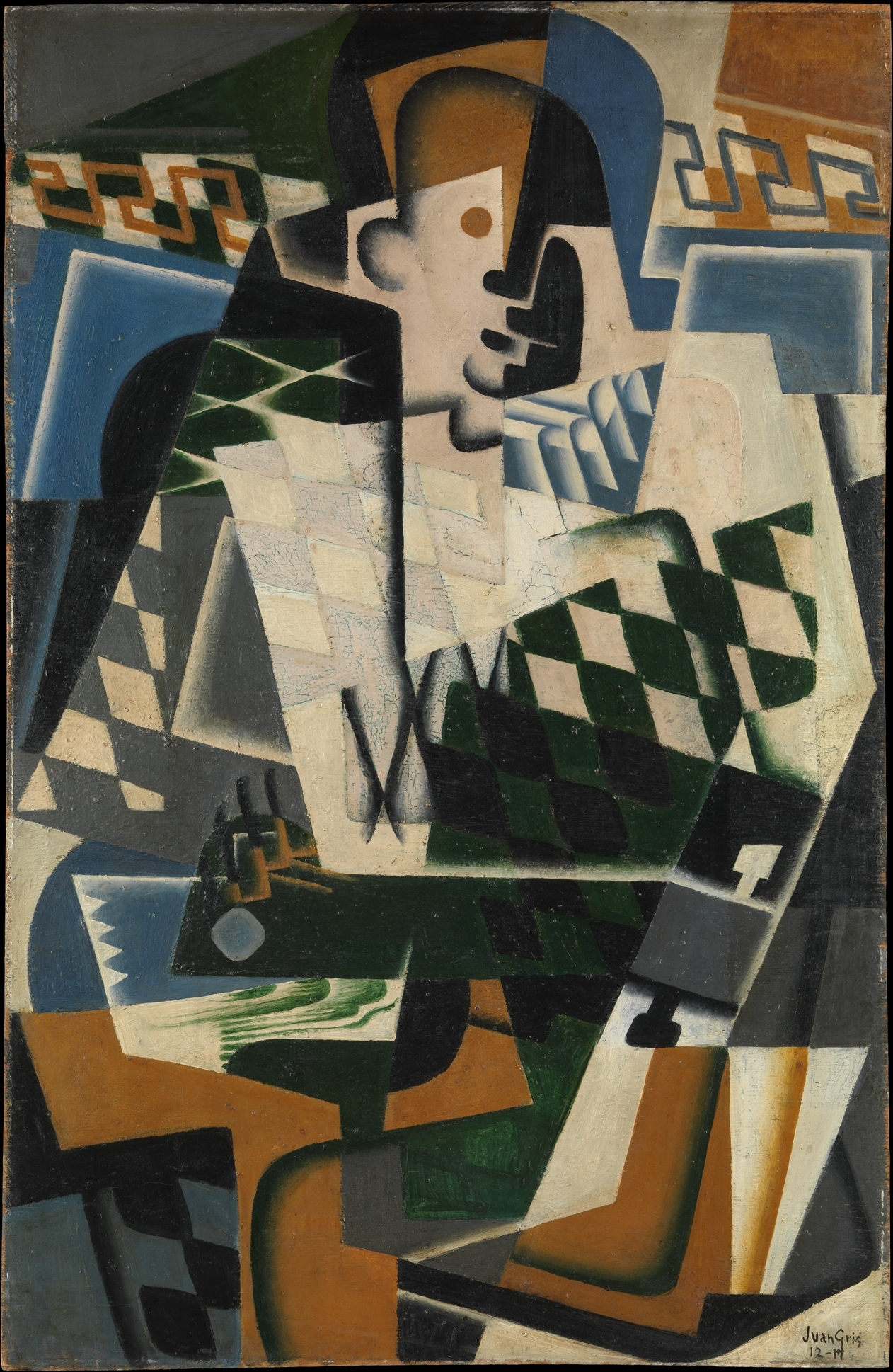
- Artist: Juan Gris
- Year: 1917
- Medium: Oil on wood panel
- Dimensions: 100.3 cm × 65.1 cm (39.5 in × 25.6 in)
- Location: Metropolitan Museum of Art, New York
- Accession: 2008.468

Harlequin with a Guitar is an oil on canvas painting by Spanish cubist Juan Gris, from 1917. The work is in the collection of the Metropolitan Museum of Art, in New York.

The harlequin with his checkered costume was a favorite theme of cubists, and Gris portrayed him in approximately forty works between 1917 and 1925.
