= Nude on a Blue Cushion =

Painting by Amedeo Modigliani

- Artist: Amedeo Modigliani
- Year: 1917
- Medium: Oil on linen
- Movement: Expressionism
- Dimensions: 65.4 cm × 100.9 cm (25.7 in × 39.7 in)
- Location: National Gallery of Art

Nude on a Blue Cushion is an oil painting by Amedeo Modigliani, completed in 1917. It is currently on display at the National Gallery of Art in Washington, D.C. The painting depicts a nude woman relaxing on her side on a blue cushion. It is one of a series of nudes he painted from 1916–1919 commissioned by art dealer Leopold Zborowski. When the collection was displayed in Paris, the police reportedly shut it down on its opening day for its obscenity.
