= Light Coming on the Plains =

1917 paintings by Georgia O'Keeffe

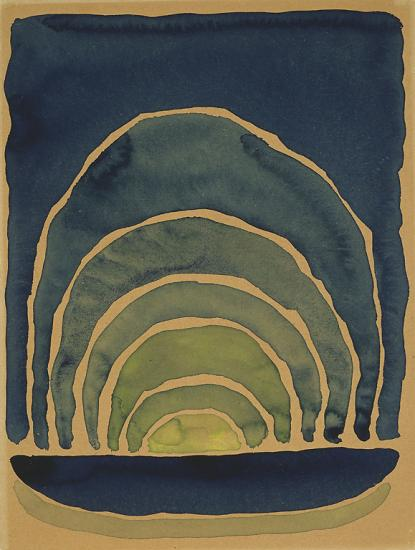
Light Coming on the Plains No. I

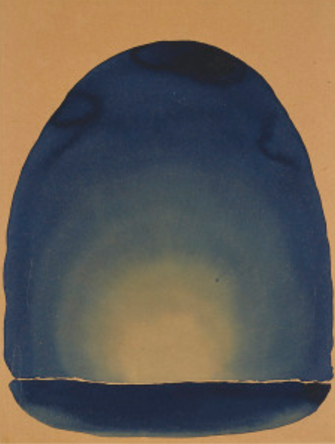
Light Coming on the Plains No. II

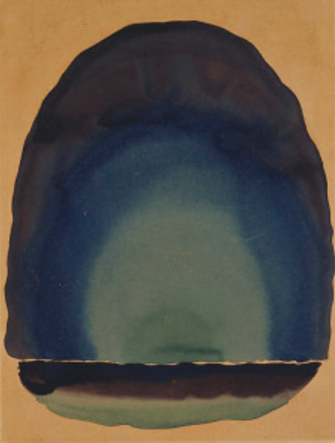
Light Coming on the Plains No. III

Watercolors made by Georgia O'Keeffe in 1917 that are in the collection of the Amon Carter Museum of American Art

Light Coming on the Plains is the name of three watercolor paintings made by Georgia O'Keeffe in 1917. They were made when O'Keeffe was teaching at West Texas State Normal College in Canyon, Texas. They reflect the evolution of her work towards pure abstraction, and an early American modernist landscape. They were unique for their time. Compared to Sunrise that she painted one year earlier, the paintings were simpler and more abstract.

Striving to design harmonious paintings that were an interpretation of her feelings about the subject, she created works of the Texas plains and wide open skies—and particularly the sunrises found there—that were wondrous to her. They have been called radical works of art, and Light Coming on the Plains III is considered one of the best paintings of the skies by Laura Cumming of The Guardian.

== Background ==
She began a series of watercolor paintings based upon the scenery and expansive views during her walks, which often included Palo Duro Canyon. O'Keeffe enjoyed the Texas plains and particularly the sky, which she said she loved and found wonderful. She enjoyed sunrises, sunsets and moonrises—and developed a fondness for intense and nocturnal colors. During an early morning bus ride from Amarillo to Canyon, O’Keefe said that she saw "the most extraordinary sunrise" that encouraged her to paint again.

My first memory is of the brightness of light—light all around.

—Georgia O'Keeffe

She moved out of her boarding house and chose to move into the home of the college physics professor and his wife because it was on the third floor and faced east, giving her a clear view of the dawning day.

Building upon a practice she began in South Carolina in her charcoal abstractions, O'Keeffe painted to express her most private sensations and feelings. Rather than sketching out a design, she freely painted with watercolor.

== Overview ==
O'Keeffe painted until she believed she truly captured her feelings in the watercolor, Light Coming on the Plains No. I. Due to its minimal form, it is an abstraction, yet still evocative of a sunrise. The early modernist painting, a unique type of landscape painting for the time, approached pure abstraction.

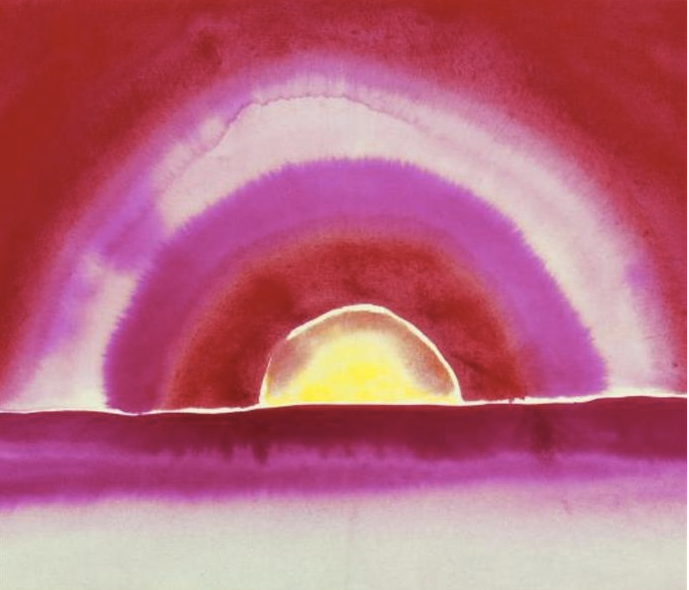
Georgia O'Keeffe, Sunrise, watercolor, 1916

The painting is more subtle and evocative of a sunrise than her Sunrise painting of 1916. Rather than the depiction a brilliant sunrise, Light Coming on the Plains is evocative of the sun rising in the sky through ever deepening color washes of indigo blue. In the series, she reflects her ability to design with minimal form and to create harmony using tonal values, or Notan-composition, that she learned through Alon Bemet and Arthur Wesley Dow. The work evokes the philosophy of Henri Bergson, who found that the purpose of art is to create a communion between ourselves and nature.

The first two paintings have a lighter orb, the third is darker, which reflects the "ebb and flow of light at dawn." O’Keeffe described her experience of a sunrise on the Texas plains, "The light would begin to appear, and then it would disappear and then there would be a kind of halo effect, and then it would appear again. The light would come and go for a while before it came."

Alfred Stieglitz arranged a retrospective of 100 of her paintings at Anderson Galleries in January 1923 that included Light Coming on the Plains No. II and III.

Laura Cumming of The Guardian included it in her list of the top 10 paintings of the sky in 2012. She later compared it to O'Keeffe's signature motifs of erotic flowers and desert skulls, calling Light Coming on the Plains III "one of the purest and most radical images O’Keeffe ever made". About the motivation and development of the work, Cumming states, "Daybreak over Texas, and Georgia O’Keeffe is out in the landscape, mesmerised by the vast skies above her. She paints everything her eyes can take in. The dawn becomes a luminous glow beneath the blue arches of her marvellous watercolour, a rising dome that hovers between the real and the abstract. The painting is small but it holds infinity."
