= John Toothill =

England international rugby union & league footballer

Personal information
- Full name: John Thomas Toothill
- Born: second ¼ 1866; Bradford, England
- Died: 29 June 1947 (aged 81); Bradford, England

Playing information

Rugby union
- Position: Forwards
Club
Years	Team	Pld	T	G	FG	P
≤1890–95	Bradford FC
Representative
Years	Team	Pld	T	G	FG	P
≤1893/94–≥93/94	Yorkshire	50
1890–94	England	12	1	0	0	1

Rugby league
- Position: Forwards
Club
Years	Team	Pld	T	G	FG	P
1895–≥98	Bradford FC

John Thomas Toothill (birth registered second ¼ 1866 – 29 June 1947) was an English rugby union, and professional rugby league footballer who played in the 1890s. He played representative level rugby union (RU) for England and Yorkshire, and at club level for Bradford FC, as a forward, e.g. front row, lock, or back row, and club level rugby league (RL) for Bradford FC, as a forward. Prior to Tuesday 27 August 1895, Bradford FC was a rugby union club, it then became a rugby league club, and since 1907 it has been the association football (soccer) club Bradford Park Avenue.

== Background ==
Jack Toothill's birth was registered in Bradford, West Riding of Yorkshire, England, and he died aged 81 in Bradford, West Riding of Yorkshire, England.

== Playing career ==
=== International honours ===
Jack Toothill won caps for England (RU) while at Bradford FC in the 1890 Home Nations Championship against Scotland, and Ireland, in the 1891 Home Nations Championship against Wales, and Ireland, in the 1892 Home Nations Championship against Wales, Ireland, and Scotland, in the 1893 Home Nations Championship against Wales, Ireland, and Scotland, in the 1894 Home Nations Championship against Wales, and Ireland.

In the early years of rugby football the goal was to score goals, and a try had zero value, but it provided the opportunity to try at goal, and convert the try to a goal with an unopposed kick at the goal posts. The point values of both the try and goal have varied over time, and in the early years footballers could "score" a try, without scoring any points.

=== County honours ===
Jack Toothill won cap(s) for Yorkshire (RU) while at Bradford FC, in William Barnes Wollen's painting of Yorkshire's 11–3 victory over Lancashire during the 1893/94 season, a painting that is now held at the Rugby Football Union headquarters in the Twickenham Stadium, Alfred "Alf" Barraclough can be seen being tackled, and passing the ball to Jack Toothill, with Tommy Dobson on the outside, although Tommy Dobson did not actually participate in this particular match.

=== Challenge Cup Final appearances ===
Jack Toothill played as a forward in Bradford FC's 0–7 defeat by Batley in the 1898 Challenge Cup Final during the 1897–98 season at Headingley, Leeds on Saturday 23 April 1898, in front of a crowd of 27,941.

=== Change of Code ===
When Bradford FC converted from the rugby union code to the rugby league code on Tuesday 27 August 1895, Jack Toothill would have been approximately 29. Consequently, he was both a rugby union and rugby league footballer for Bradford FC.

== Genealogical information ==
Jack Toothill's marriage was registered during second ¼ 1892 in Bradford.
