= Jeanne Hébuterne with Hat and Necklace =

1917 painting by Amedeo Modigliani

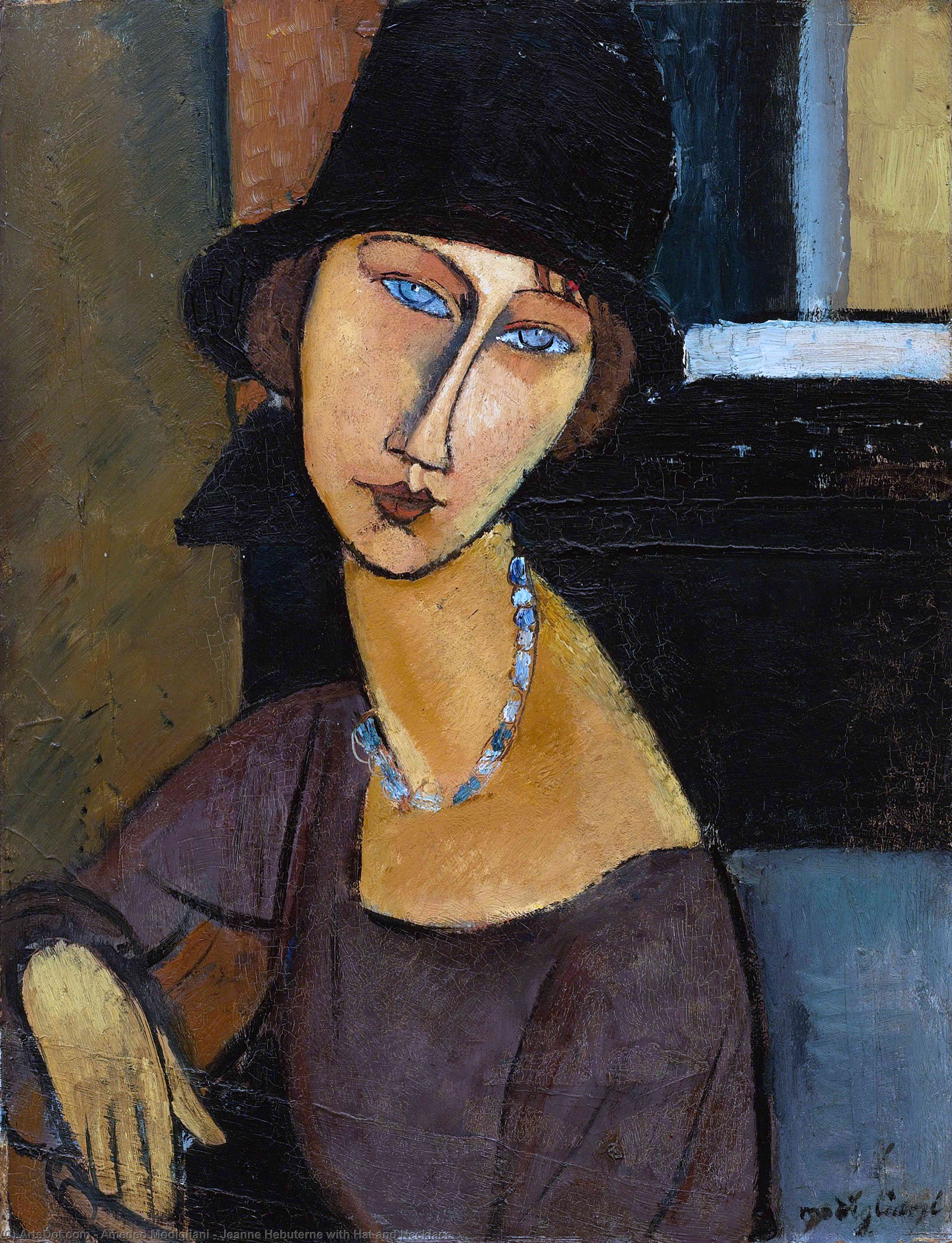
- Artist: Amedeo Modigliani
- Year: 1917
- Medium: oil on canvas
- Dimensions: 67 cm × 51.5 cm (26 in × 20.3 in)
- Owner: Private collection

Jeanne Hébuterne with Hat and Necklace is an oil-on-canvas painting by Italian painter Amedeo Modigliani created in 1917.

== Description ==
The painting shows a modern woman with her hair tucked under a stylish hat. A special attention is given to her eyes painted in a light shade of blue which comes forward on a darker background.

Modigliani met Jeanne Hébuterne, a 19-year-old art student, in the spring of 1917 through the Russian sculptor Chana Orloff. Soon Modigliani ended his relationship with the English poet and art critic Beatrice Hastings and a short time later Hébuterne and Modigliani moved together into a studio on the Rue de la Grande Chaumière. Jeanne began to pose for him and became a principal subject for Modigliani's art. Modigliani depicted Jeanne Hébuterne in more than twenty works but never in nude. He transformed Hébuterne into an idyllic symbol of a modern woman.

A day after Modigliani’s death of tuberculous meningitis, on 25 January 1920, Hébuterne being eight months pregnant, committed suicide by throwing herself from the window of her parents’ apartment.
