= Tom Fry (rugby union) =

- Full name: Thomas William Fry
- Born: 15 September 1858 Greenwich, London, England
- Died: 29 May 1944 (aged 85) Chislehurst, Kent, England

Rugby union career
- Position: Fullback
Amateur team(s)
Years	Team	Apps	(Points)
–	Queen's House Football Club		
International career
Years	Team	Apps	(Points)
1880–81	England	3	

Thomas William Fry (15 September 1858 – 29 May 1944) was an English international rugby union player.

Fry hailed from Greenwich and was one of three siblings who were locally notable as rugby players.

A fullback, Fry was capped three times for England, debuting against Ireland at Lansdowne Road in 1880. His only international try, against Scotland, remained the last scored by an England fullback for 91 years. He was a leading player for Queen's House in London and his retirement helped precipitate the club's disbandment.

Fry was a corn broker by profession.

== See also ==
- List of England national rugby union players
