= Portrait of Vincent Nubiola =

1917 painting by Joan Miró

- Artist: Joan Miró
- Year: 1917
- Type: Oil painting
- Dimensions: 104 cm × 113 cm (41 in × 44 in)
- Location: Folkwang Museum; Essen

Portrait of Vincent Nubiola (Catalan: Retrat de Vicenç Nubiola) is an oil painting by Spanish artist Joan Miró. Painted in 1917 when Miró was 24 years old, a year before his first exhibition, the portrait is now considered a masterpiece from a period when he experimented with both Cubism and Fauvism. It is also said by some art critics to show the influence of Van Gogh. Acquired for a time by Picasso, the painting is now in the permanent collection of the Folkwang Museum in Essen (Germany).

== History ==
Miró showed an early passion for art, and attended drawing classes while he was at primary school, but he had been heading for a career in banking when he had a nervous breakdown and decided to study art. He met Vicenç Nubiola whilst studying life art at Barcelona's Cercle Artístic de Sant Lluc, a catholic-inspired art society, in 1913. Nubiola was a professor of agriculture at the School of Fine Arts in Barcelona. At the art society Miró also met Joan Prats, who became one of his lifelong friends and eventually helped Miró to build his foundation. Miró painted the Nubiola portrait during 1917 and shortly after. It was included in his first solo exhibition, at the Galeries Dalmau in Barcelona, catalogue number 46.

== Description ==
This is one of the well-known works from Miró's early period when he experimented with a mixture of both Cubism and Fauvism. At this time he made several landscapes and portraits, such as Portrait of Enric Cristòfol Ricart also from 1917 and now in the Metropolitan Museum of Art in New York. Several authors comment that this work could be influenced by the style of Van Gogh for whom Miró always felt admiration. The Nubiola portrait is signed Miró in the lower left margin.

The painting shows Nubiola sitting in a chair beside a table on which there are fruit, a porró (typical Catalan wine vessel for drinking directly without a glass), and a potted plant. The flat backdrop behind the figure is decorated with triangles and arcs. The red of Nubiola's open collar shirt indicates his political radicalism; Miró painted himself wearing an identical shirt in a later self-portrait. This work was later acquired by Picasso.

== Provenance ==
This portrait has been in the permanent collection of the Folkwang Museum in Essen (Germany), since 1966 when it was purchased from the Galerie Wilhelm Großhennig in Düsseldorf. The purchase was made with the support from the state of North Rhine – Westphalia, the Westdeutsche Rundfunk, and it entered the museum with the registration number Inv. G 351.
