= Descent from the Cross (Beckmann) =

Painting by Max Beckmann

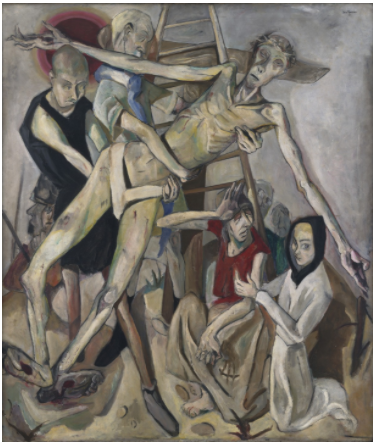
- Artist: Max Beckmann
- Year: 1917
- Medium: Oil on canvas
- Dimensions: 151,2 cm × 128,9 cm (595 in × 507 in)
- Location: Museum of Modern Art; New York

Descent from the Cross is an oil-on-canvas painting by German artist Max Beckmann, executed in 1917. It is held at the Museum of Modern Art, in New York.

== History and description ==
Beckmann's harsh experience serving in the German Army during World War I influenced his new approach to painting in the following years. His works from this period include several paintings with religious themes, such as Christ and the Woman Taken in Adultery and this Descent from the Cross, created both in 1917. The current painting is very different from the traditional representations of the same event. Beckmann was influenced for this painting in particular by the work of German Renaissance painters, such as Matthias Grünewald and Hans Holbein. Its possible that this work was created as response to a challenge made by German curator Gustav Hartmann, who wanted him to create something as powerful as the ancient German art.

The composition, using several perspectives and distorted figures, is dominated by the oversize corpse of Jesus, which occupies the central place. Jesus's body shows signs of rigor mortis, it is pale and covered by bruises and sores. There are coagulated blood pools around the stigmata, while his stretched arms are a remainder of the crucifixion. A darkened sun is seen at the upper left, while two women kneel at the lower right, reduced in size. Two men carry the corpse of Jesus from the cross, while their ladder extends to outside the painting, as if pointing to Heaven.
