= Portrait of Blaise Cendrars =

Painting by Amedeo Modigliani

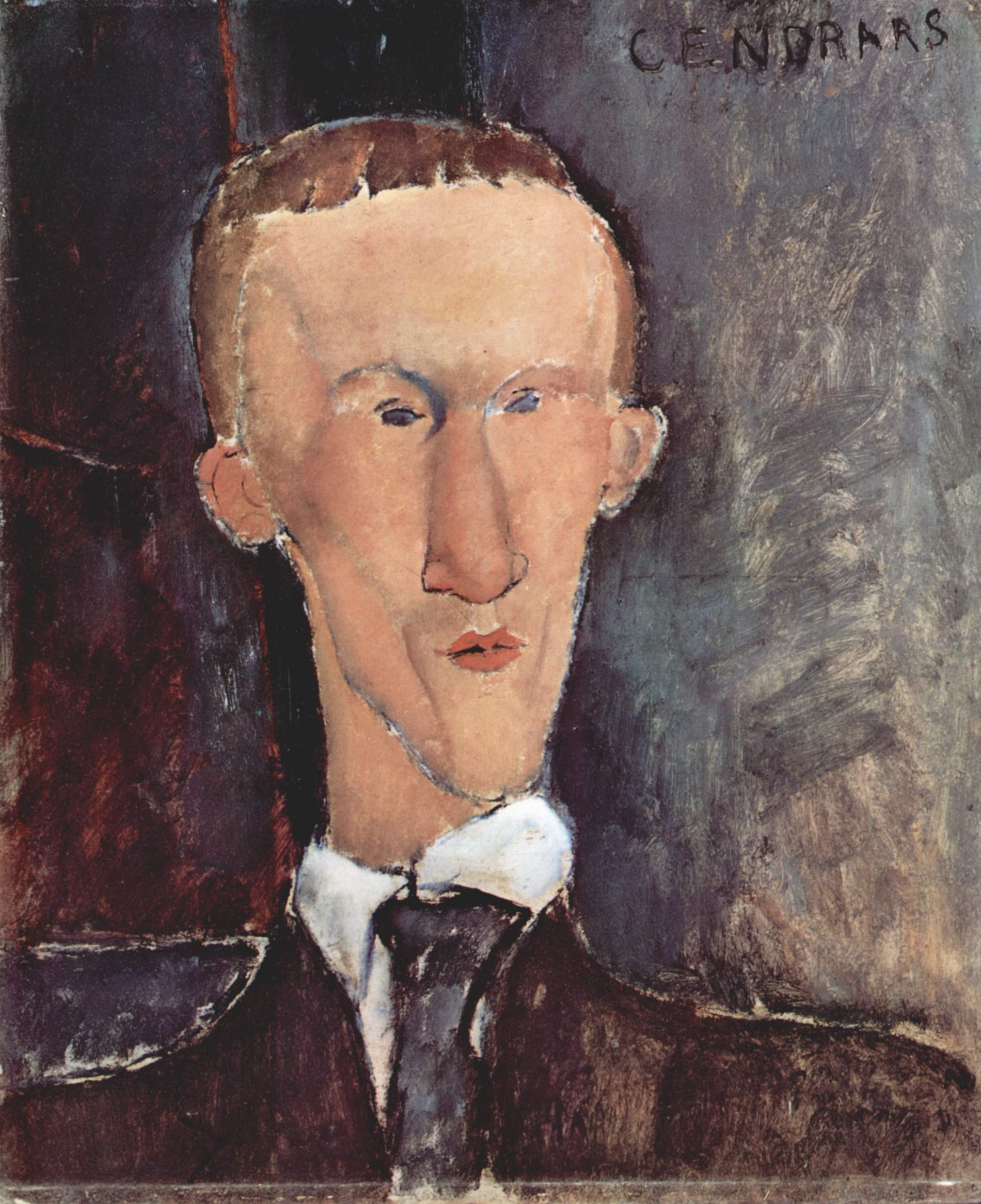
Portrait of Blaise Cendrars (1917) by Blaise Cendrars

Portrait of Blaise Cendrars is a 1917 oil on card painting by Amedeo Modigliani, showing the French writer Blaise Cendrars. Formerly part of the Riccardo Gualino collection, it is now in the Galleria Sabauda in Turin.
