= Self-Portrait with Red Scarf =

Painting by Max Beckmann

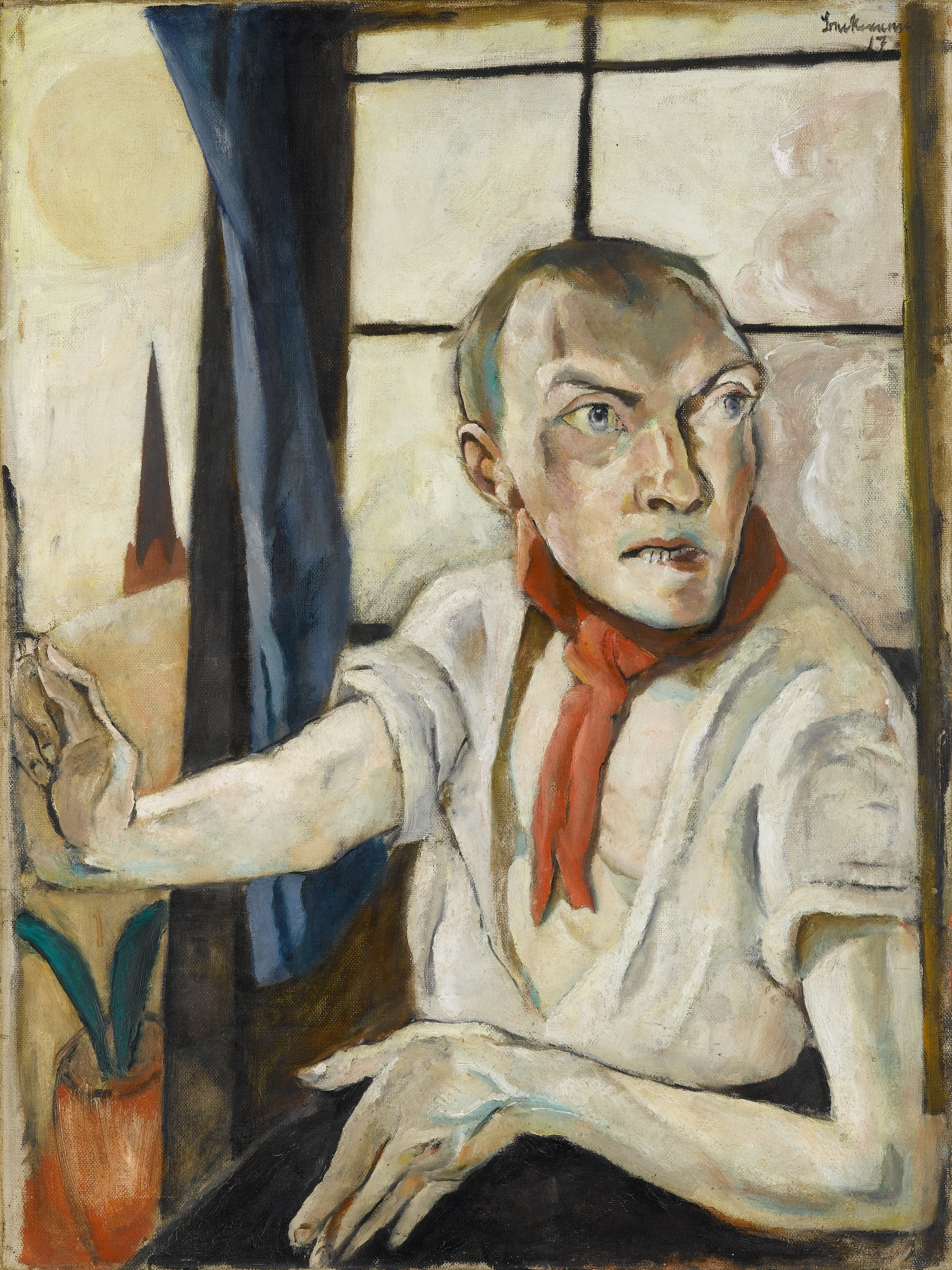
- Artist: Max Beckmann
- Year: 1917
- Medium: Oil on canvas
- Dimensions: 80 cm × 60 cm (31 in × 24 in)
- Location: Staatsgalerie Stuttgart; Stuttgart

Self-Portrait with Red Scarf is an oil on canvas painting by Max Beckmann, executed in 1917. It is housed at the Staatsgalerie Stuttgart.

== History and description ==
The physician soldier Max Beckmann, who had enthusiastically joined the German Army at World War I, experienced the horrors of warfare in the Western Front and Flanders, suffering a serious nervous collapse in July 1915. His view of the war changed drastically, and this is reflected in the paintings he did afterwards. In his own words, the war impressions made him want to "enclose the unspeakable things of life in... sharp, crystalline surfaces and lines".

This self-portrait was executed in 1917 and reflects his negative impressions of the still ongoing war. His left hand shows what appears to be the suggestion of a wound. The head of the artist is located exactly at the intersection of the cross that can be seen through the window. The symbol of the cross can be seen as suggesting the artist as a martyr, while the red scarf also seems to represent his rebellion against the circumstances. He said at this time: "Humility before God is over. My religion (...) is a challenge against God, in my paintings I rebuke God for everything he did wrong."

The painting was acquired by the Staatsgalerie Stuttgart in 1924, but was confiscated by the Nazi regimen in 1937, during their purge of so-called Degenerate art. It returned to the museum's collection in 1948.
