= John Schofield (rugby union) =

England international rugby union player

- Full name: John Wood Schofield
- Born: 10 March 1858 Stretford, England
- Died: 3 May 1931 (aged 73) Bucklow, England
- School: Uppingham School
- Occupation: Stockbroker

Rugby union career
- Position: Forward
International career
Years	Team	Apps	(Points)
1880	England	1	(0)

John Wood Schofield (10 March 1858 – 3 May 1931) was an English international rugby union player.

A native of Manchester, Schofield was the son of a local alderman and attended Uppingham School.

Schofield, a stockbroker by profession, played for the Manchester Rugby Club and began appearing in their first XV during the 1878–79 season. He got his first opportunity to appear for Lancashire soon when forward Ellis Markendale pulled out of a match against Yorkshire, then earned further representative honours in the 1878–79 Home Nations series, as a late England call up to play against Ireland in Dublin.

== See also ==
- List of England national rugby union players
