= Thomas Dobson (rugby) =

England international rugby union, league footballer and sprinter

- Tommy Dobson wearing his England (RU) shirt, and cap

Personal information
- Full name: Thomas Hyde Dobson
- Born: February 1872; Bradford, England
- Died: 12 November 1902 (aged 30); Bradford, West Riding of Yorkshire, England

Playing information

Rugby union
- Position: Centre
Club
Years	Team	Pld	T	G	FG	P
≤1895–95	Bradford FC
Representative
Years	Team	Pld	T	G	FG	P
≤1893/94–≥93/94	Yorkshire	≥1
1895	England	1	0	0	0	0

Rugby league
- Position: Wing
Club
Years	Team	Pld	T	G	FG	P
1895–≥98	Bradford FC

Thomas Hyde Dobson (February 1872 – 12 November 1902) was an English rugby union footballer, professional sprinter, and professional rugby league footballer who played in the 1890s. He played representative level rugby union (RU) for England and Yorkshire, and at club level for Undercliffe RFC, Laisterdyke RFC, Bowling RFC, and Bradford FC, as a centre, and club level rugby league (RL) for Bradford FC, as a wing. As a sprinter, primarily in Northern England, he won over £200 in prizes (based on increases in average earnings, this would be approximately £81,950 in 2015), Prior to Tuesday 27 August 1895, Bradford FC was a rugby union club, it then became a rugby league club, and since 1907 it has been the association football (soccer) club Bradford Park Avenue.

== Background ==
Tommy Dobson was born in Bradford, West Riding of Yorkshire, England, and he died age 30 in Bradford, West Riding of Yorkshire, from food poisoning after eating raw mussels.

== Playing career ==
=== International honours ===
Tommy Dobson won a cap for England (RU) while at Bradford FC in 1895 against Scotland.

=== County honours ===
Tommy Dobson won cap(s) for Yorkshire (RU) while at Bradford FC, in William Barnes Wollen's painting of Yorkshire's 11–3 victory over Lancashire during the 1893/94 season, a painting that is now held at the Rugby Football Union headquarters in the Twickenham Stadium, Alfred "Alf" Barraclough can be seen being tackled, and passing the ball to Jack Toothill, with Tommy Dobson on the outside, although Tommy Dobson did not actually participate in this particular match.

=== Challenge Cup Final appearances ===
Tommy Dobson played on the wing in Bradford FC's 0–7 defeat by Batley in the 1898 Challenge Cup Final during the 1897–98 season at Headingley, Leeds on Saturday 23 April 1898, in front of a crowd of 27,941.

=== Change of Code ===
When Bradford FC converted from the rugby union code to the rugby league code on Tuesday 27 August 1895, Tommy Dobson would have been approximately 23. Consequently, he was both a rugby union and rugby league footballer for Bradford FC

=== Club career ===
Tommy Dobson scored Bradford FC's first ever try in the Challenge Cup in the 7–3 victory over Oldham in the 1897 Challenge Cup during the 1896–97 season at Park Avenue, Bradford on Saturday 20 March 1897.

== Genealogical information ==
Tommy Dobson was the son of the professional sprinter, Harry Dobson, winner of the Sheffield Handicap, then the world's foremost sprint event which was run over a turf course and attracted "the fastest sprinters in the world". Tommy Dobson's marriage to Jane Elizabeth (née Jagger) was registered during first ¼ 1895 in Bradford district.
