= Reclining Nude (Modigliani) =

1917 painting by Amedeo Modigliani

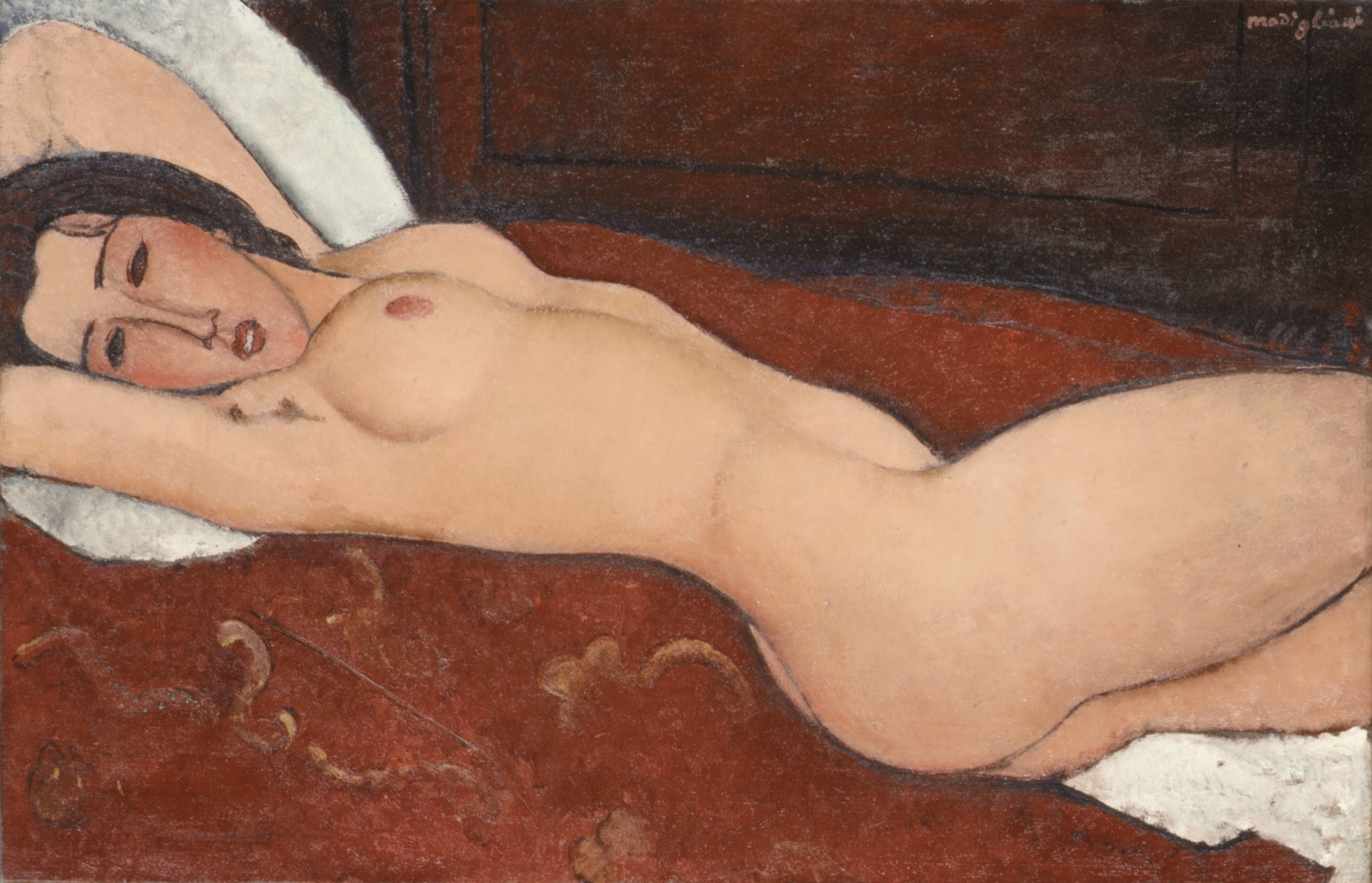
- Artist: Amedeo Modigliani
- Year: 1917
- Medium: Oil on canvas
- Dimensions: 60.6 cm × 92.7 cm (23.9 in × 36.5 in)
- Location: Metropolitan Museum of Art; New York

Reclining Nude is a painting by Italian artist Amedeo Modigliani. Done in oil on canvas in 1917, the painting was one of Modigliani's celebrated series of nudes. The work is in the collection of the Metropolitan Museum of Art, in New York.
