= Jack Schofield (footballer) =

English footballer

Personal information
- Full name: John Schofield
- Place of birth: Waterfoot, England
- Height: 5 ft 8 1/2 in (1.74 m)
- Position: Wing half

Senior career*
Years	Team	Apps	(Gls)
	Bacup Borough	?	(?)
1931–1933	Burnley	9	(0)
1935–1936	Accrington Stanley	10	(0)
	Rossendale United	?	(?)
- * Club domestic league appearances and goals

John "Jack" Schofield was an English professional footballer who played as a wing half.
