= Ellis Markendale =

- Born: 11 November 1856 Salford, England
- Died: 9 May 1938 (aged 81) Ashbourne, England
- School: Uppingham School

Rugby union career
- Position: Forward
International career
Years	Team	Apps	(Points)
1880	England	1	

Ellis Markendale (11 November 1856 – 9 May 1938) was an English international rugby union player.

Markendale was born in Salford and educated at Uppingham School.

A Manchester Rangers forward, Markendale represented Lancashire and was capped for England. His only international appearance came against Ireland at Lansdowne Road and he scored an unconverted try in an England win.

== See also ==
- List of England national rugby union players
