= Queen's House Football Club =

Former English rugby union club, based in Greenwich

Queen's House
- Full name: Queen's House Football Club
- Union: Rugby Football Union
- Founded: 1867
- Disbanded: c. 1884
- Location: Greenwich, England
- Ground(s): in Greenwich and later Blackheath
Team kit

Queen's House was a 19th-century rugby football club that was notable for being one of the twenty-one founding members of the Rugby Football Union, as well as producing a number of international players in the sport's early international fixtures.

== History ==
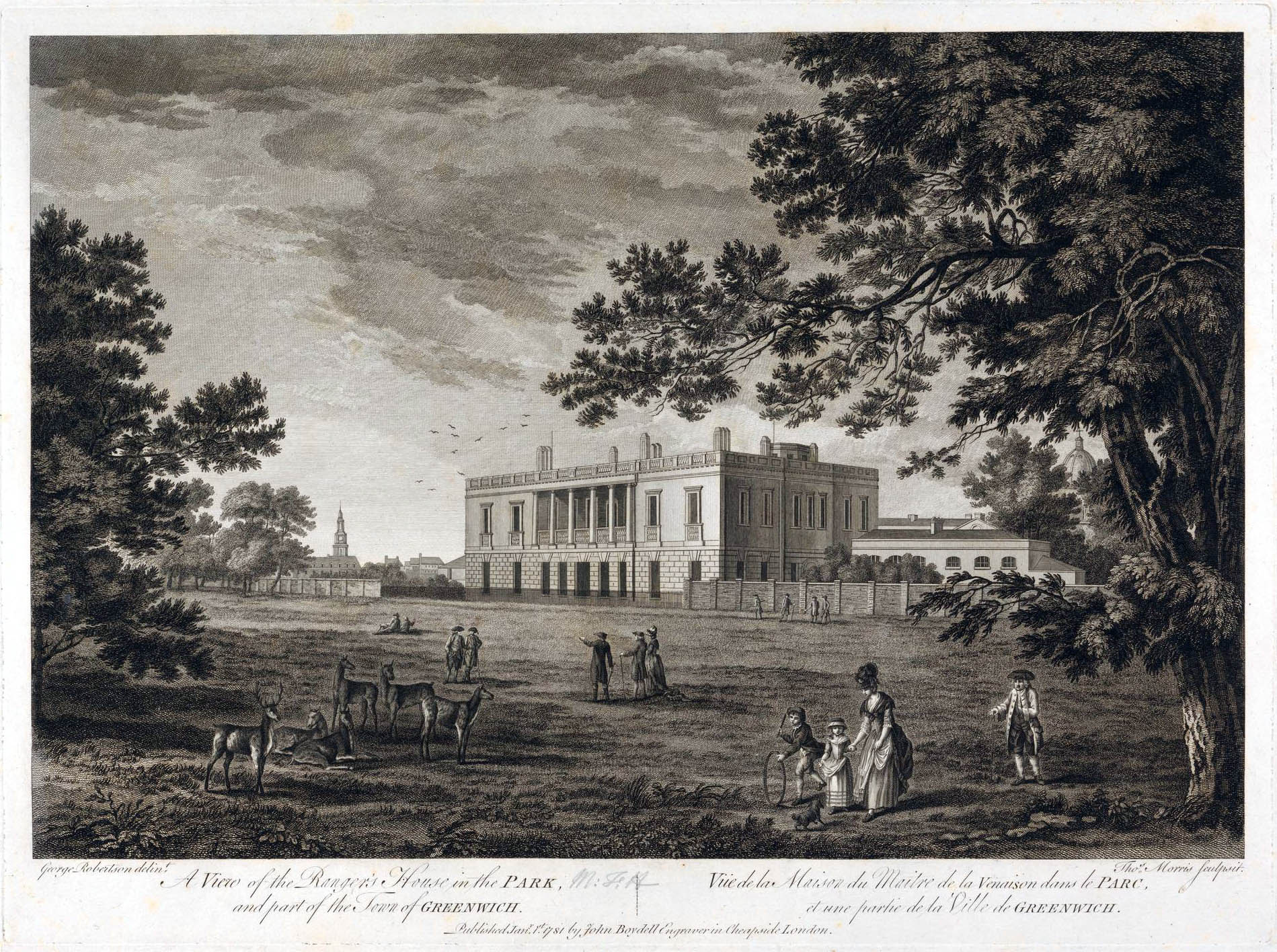
A depiction of the "Ranger's House" in 1781

Queen's House was established in 1867 through the co-operation of the brothers Rowland and Edward Hill and the families of Hewitt and Fry, who all lived in Greenwich. The club was named after the famous Queen's House in Greenwich where Rowland Hill was born. The team wore a white jersey with the blue crown. The club played football using a modified form of the Rugby School code. On 26 January 1871, they sent representation to a meeting of twenty-one London and suburban football clubs that followed Rugby School rules (Wasps were invited by failed to attend) assembled at the Pall Mall Restaurant in Regent Street. E.C. Holmes, captain of the Richmond Club assumed the presidency. It was resolved unanimously that the formation of a Rugby Football Society was desirable and thus the Rugby Football Union was formed. A president, a secretary and treasurer, and a committee of thirteen were elected, to whom was entrusted the drawing-up of the laws of the game upon the basis of the code in use at Rugby School. Although Queen's House was considered prominent enough to have been invited, they did not gain any of the thirteen places on the original committee.

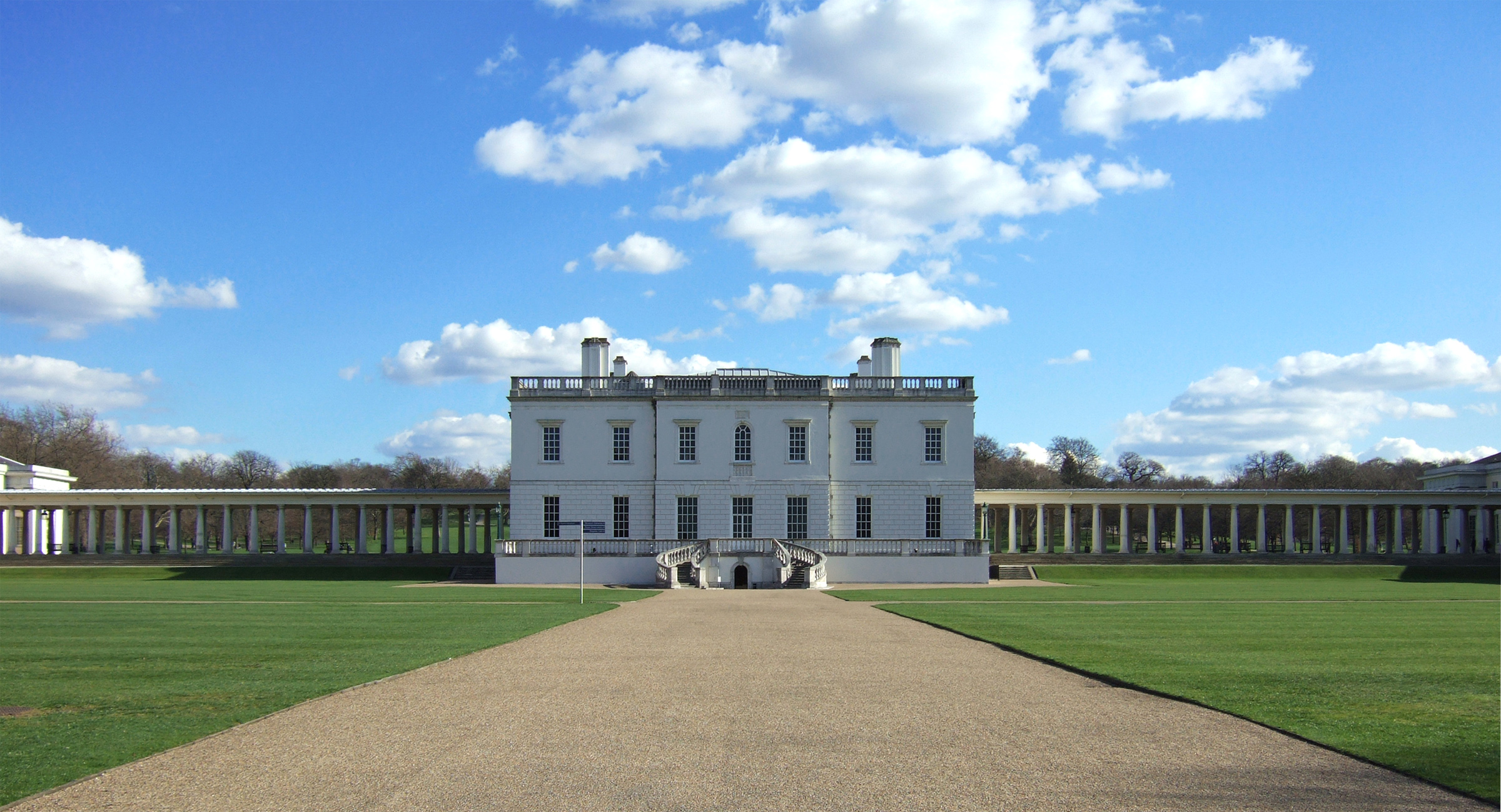
The Queen's House (pictured in 2006), after which the club was named

The club was regarded at one time as one of the most formidable clubs in London, and perhaps the most difficult to beat. The London Scottish, a team with great success against all teams in the London area, in the five matches played against Queen's House were never able to snatch a victory and in fact Sidney Ellis of Queen's House was the first player to ever cross the London Scottish try-line. At its height the team comprised Cameron Hewitt playing back, Tom and Fred Fry as three-quarters, and Sidney Fry as a half-back. In the physically powerful forwards were Walter Hewitt, the international oarsman and his brother Malcolm, as well as the England international Sidney Ellis. Contemporary accounts describe the team as having "probably as strong a set of scrummagers as were ever got together. They did not go in for a fast or showy game, and were never great scorers, but their defence was wonderfully strong, and it is doubtful whether any team ever had a finer lot of tacklers."

In the short time the team was together, their greatest rivals were their neighbours, Blackheath FC, with whom they played multiple matches.

=== Disbandment ===
With the emigration of Cameron Hewitt and Fred and Sidney Fry to Canada in the early 1880s and the retirement of Tom Fry, the team lost its nucleus. Rather than risk the probability of a decadence it was decided to disband the club in the height of its prosperity.

== Notable players ==
A number of Queen's House players represented England:

- (England) Tom Fry (first capped 1880)
- (England) Sidney Ellis (first capped 1880)
- (England) Walter Hewitt (first capped 1881)
