= William Barnes Wollen =

English painter

William Barnes Wollen Royal Institute of Painters in Water Colours
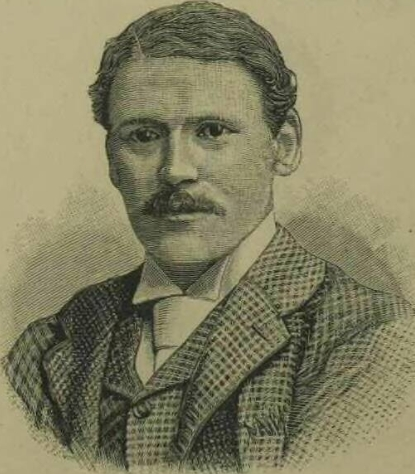
- An 1892 illustration of Wollen in The Illustrated London News
- Born: William Barnes Wollem; 6 October 1857; Leipzig, Kingdom of Saxony, Germany
- Died: 28 March 1936 (aged 78); London, England
- Style: Watercolor painting, oil painting

William Barnes Wollen (6 October 1857 – 28 March 1936) was an English painter mostly known for his paintings of battle and historical scenes and sporting events.

== Early life and career ==
Born in Leipzig, Germany, in 1857, Wollen was educated at University College School in London from 1871 to 1873 and also at the Slade School. From 1879 until 1922, he exhibited pictures at the Royal Academy, National Watercolour Society and elsewhere. His first picture exhibited at the Royal Academy was entitled "Football" but he followed this up with his first military painting in 1881 entitled "The rescue of Private Andrews by Captain Garnet J. Wolseley, H.M. 90th L.I. at the storming of the Motee Mahail, Lucknow". He was elected a member of the Royal Institute of Painters in Water Colours in 1888.

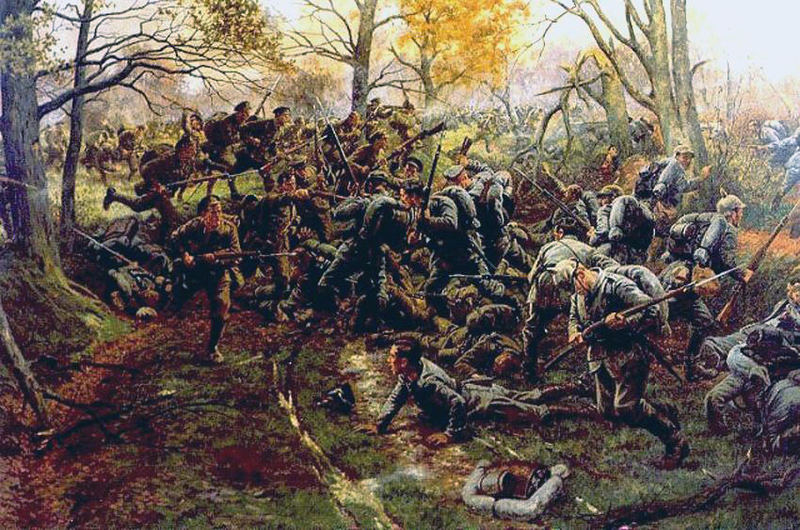
"Defeat of the Prussian Guard, Ypres, 1914"

In 1900, Wollen was commissioned by the new illustrated weekly newspaper, The Sphere, to act as one of its special artists in South Africa to cover the Boer War. His experiences during this war resulted in several paintings, including "The Imperial Light Horse at Waggon Hill, January 6, 1900", "The Victoria Cross", and "The 1st Battalion South Lancashire Regiment storming the Boer trenches at Pieter's Hill". The artist also exhibited several scenes during and shortly after World War I depicting that conflict.

== Later life and death ==
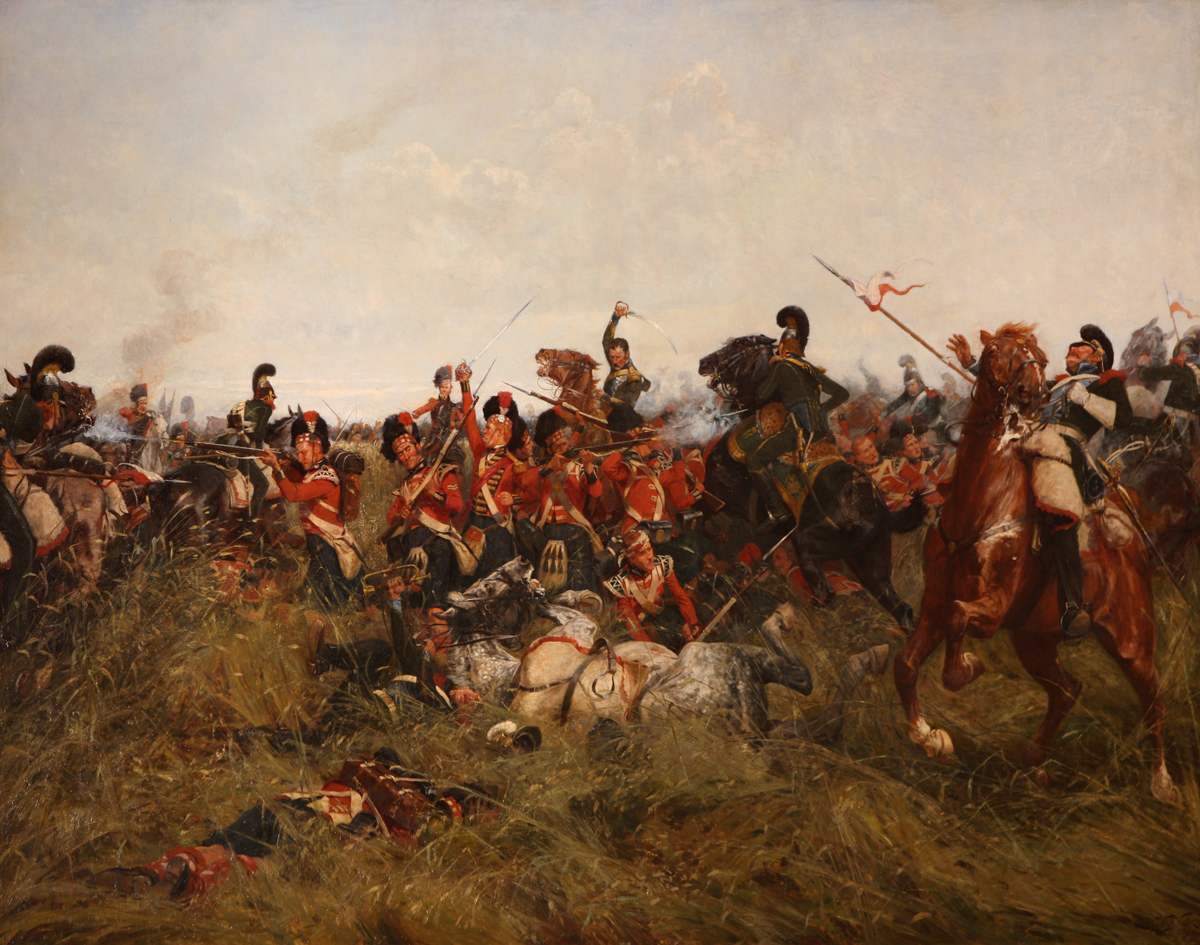
"The Black Watch (42nd Highlanders) at Bay, Quatre Bras"

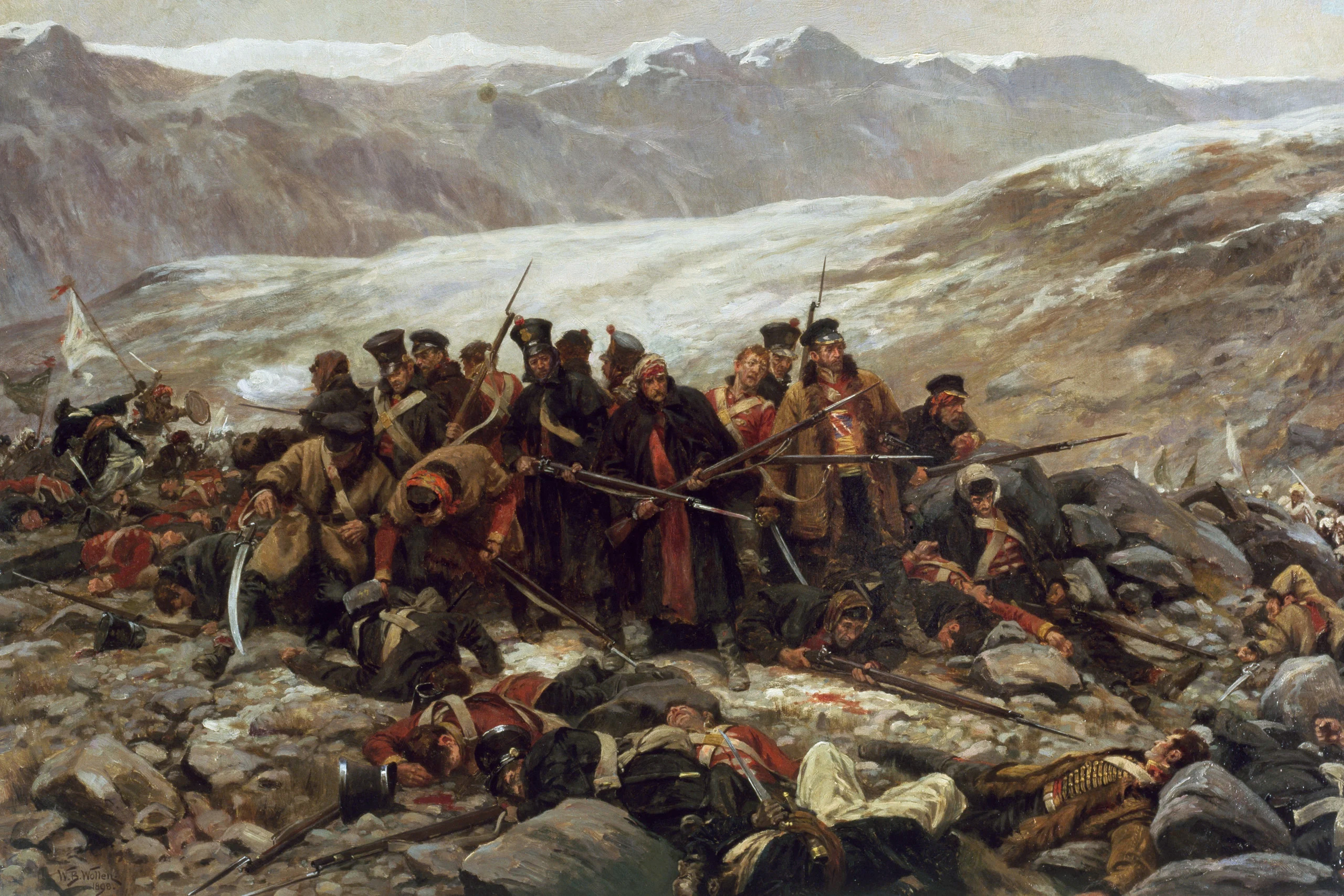
The Last Stand of the 44th Regiment at Gundamuck, 1898

Wollen lived in London during his career, in Camden Square and Bedford Park, and died in the city in 1936, aged 78.

== Paintings ==
- News (Trooper, 1645) (National Army Museum)
- Sergeant Ewart capturing the Eagle of the 45th (National War Museum, Edinburgh)
- The Black Watch (42nd Highlanders_ at Bay, Quatre Bras (1894 – Black Watch Museum, Perth)
- The Battle of the Roses (1895 – Twickenham Stadium)
- The Battle of Abu Klea, 1885 (1896 – National Army Museum)
- Charge of the 6th Inniskilling Dragoons at the Battle of Tournay (1897 – Royal Dragoon Guards)
- The Last Stand of the 44th Regiment at Gundamuck (1898 – Essex Regiment Association, on loan National Army Museum
- The 21st (Empress of India's) Lancers at Omdurman (1899 – Staff College, Camberley)
- The Victoria Cross (Colesberg, South Africa, 1900) (1901 – Durban Art Museum)
- The Imperial Light Horse at Elandslaagte (1902 – Light Horse Regiment Association, Johannesburg, on loan Africana Museum)
- The 1st Battalion, South Lancashire Regiment storming the Boer Trenches at Pieter's Hill (1903 – Queen's Lancashire Regiment)
- Guardians of the Law (English dragoons in Scotland) (Nuneaton Museum and Art Gallery)
- The Scouts (A patrol of the 10th Light Dragoons, Peninsular War) (1905 – HorsePower: The Museum of the King's Royal Hussars)
- Ambushed (English cavalry on road, 18th century) (1907 – Sunderland Art Gallery)
- Britain's Watchdogs, 1805 (Napoleon with officers on coast) (1909 – Mappin Art Gallery, Sheffield)
- The First Fight for Independence, Lexington Common, April 19, 1775 (1910 – National Army Museum)
- The Flag, Albuera, May 16, 1811 (1912 – National Army Museum (Note: Formerly Buffs Regimental Museum, City Art Gallery, Canterbury.))
- Landrecies, 25 August 1914 (1915 – National Army Museum
- Defeat of the Prussian Guard, Ypres, 1914 (1915 – Royal Green Jackets)
- The Canadians at Ypres (1915 – Princess Patricia's Canadian Light Infantry, Calgary)
- The London Territorials at Pozieres (1917 – National Army Museum
- A Canadian Battalion capturing a German Trench at Vimy (1917 – Royal Canadian Military Institute)
- Semper Fidelis: The last stand of the 2nd Devons at Bois des Buttes, May 27, 1918 (1920 – Devon and Dorset Regiment)

=== Gallery ===
Football, 1879

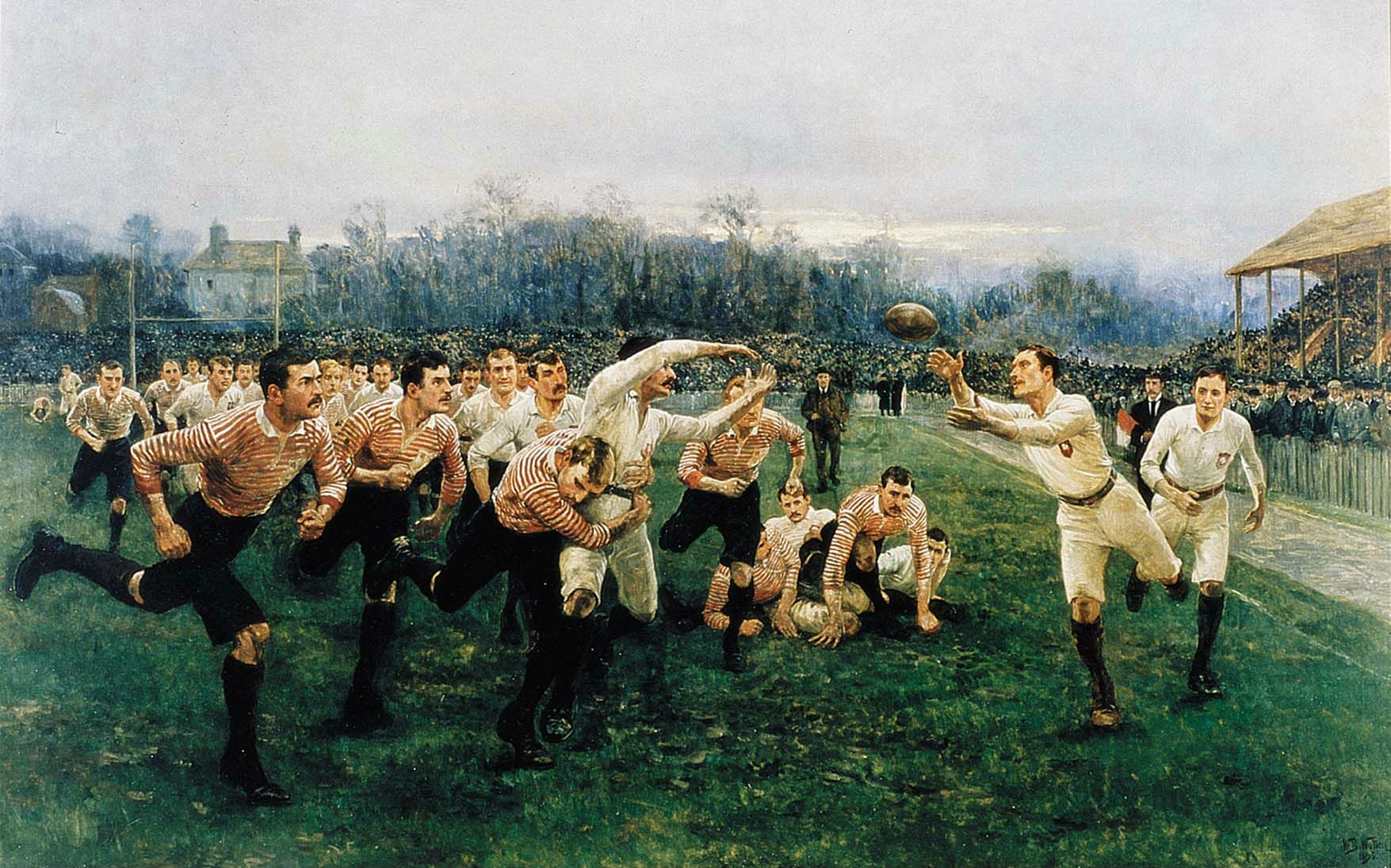
The Battle of the Roses, 1895

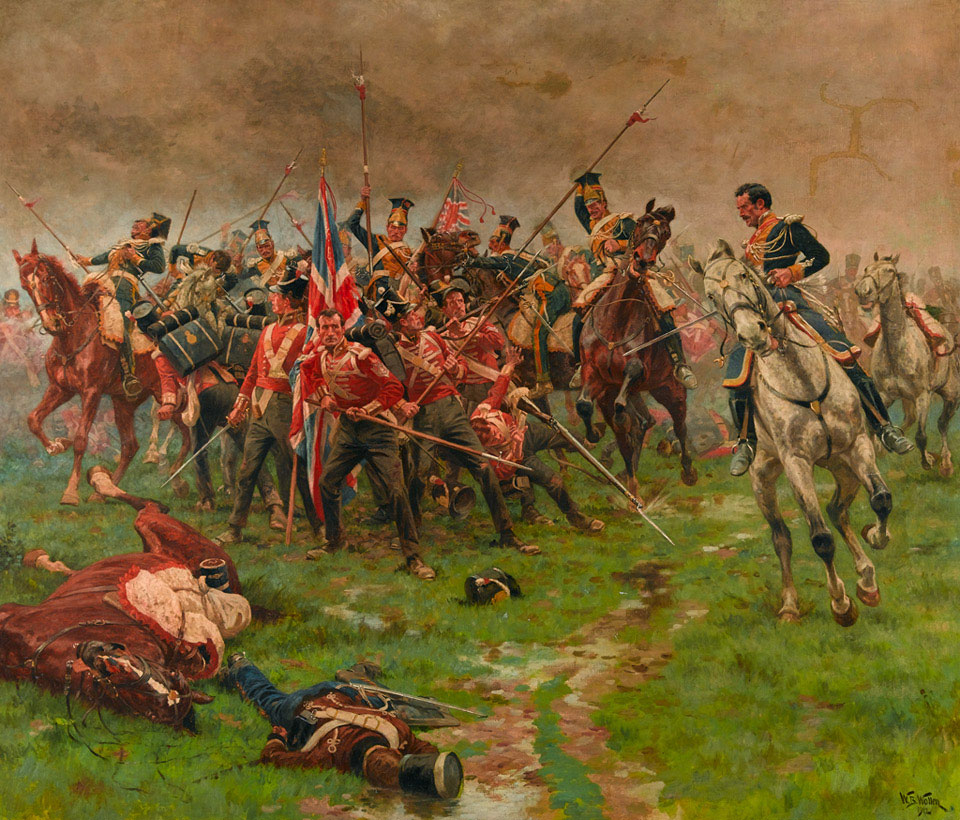
The Battle of Albuera, 1912

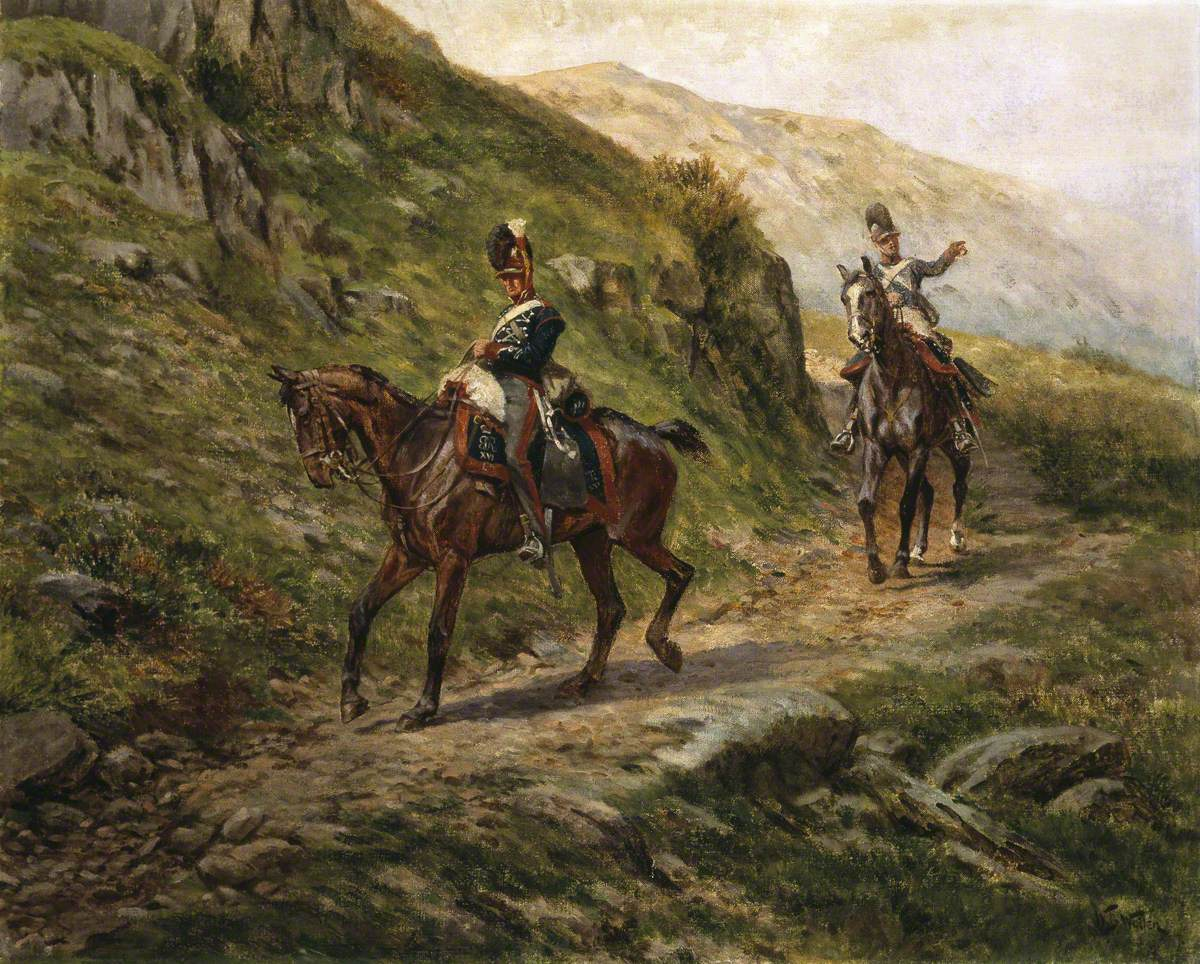
A Glimpse of the Enemy

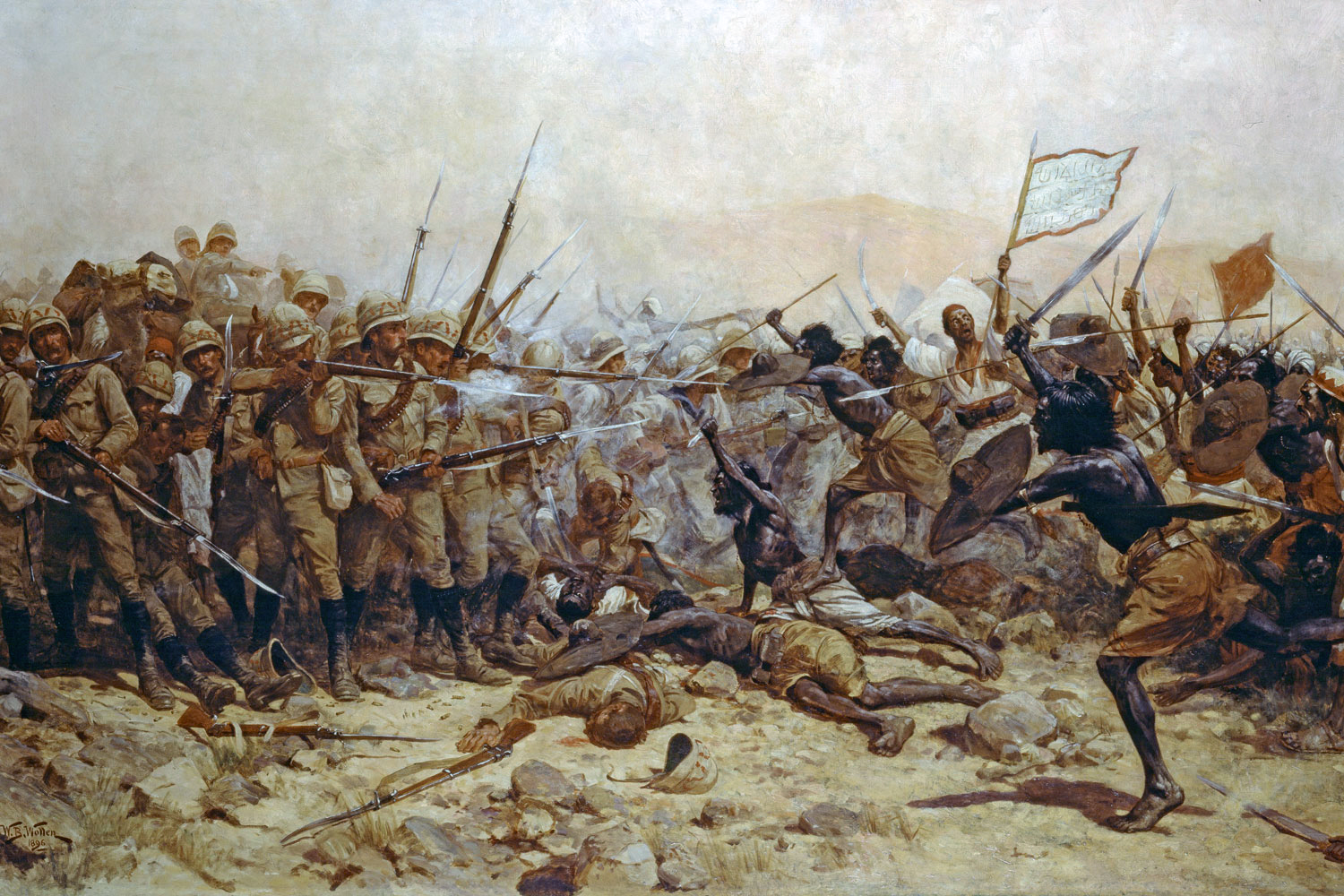
"The Battle of Abu Klea"

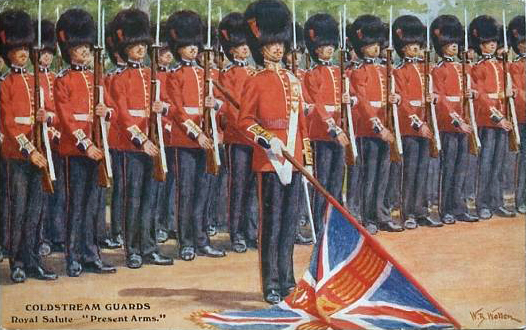
"Coldstream Guards on parade in ceremonial uniform"

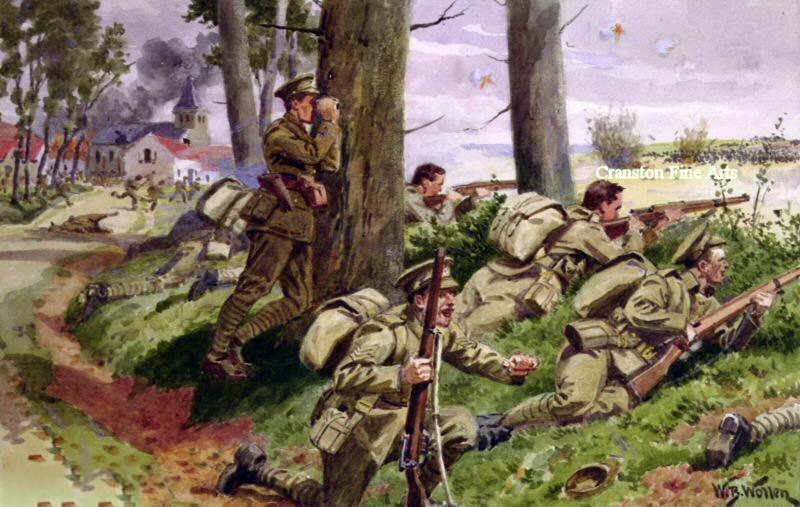
"Coldstream Guards in France, 1914"

The Territorials at Pozières, 1917

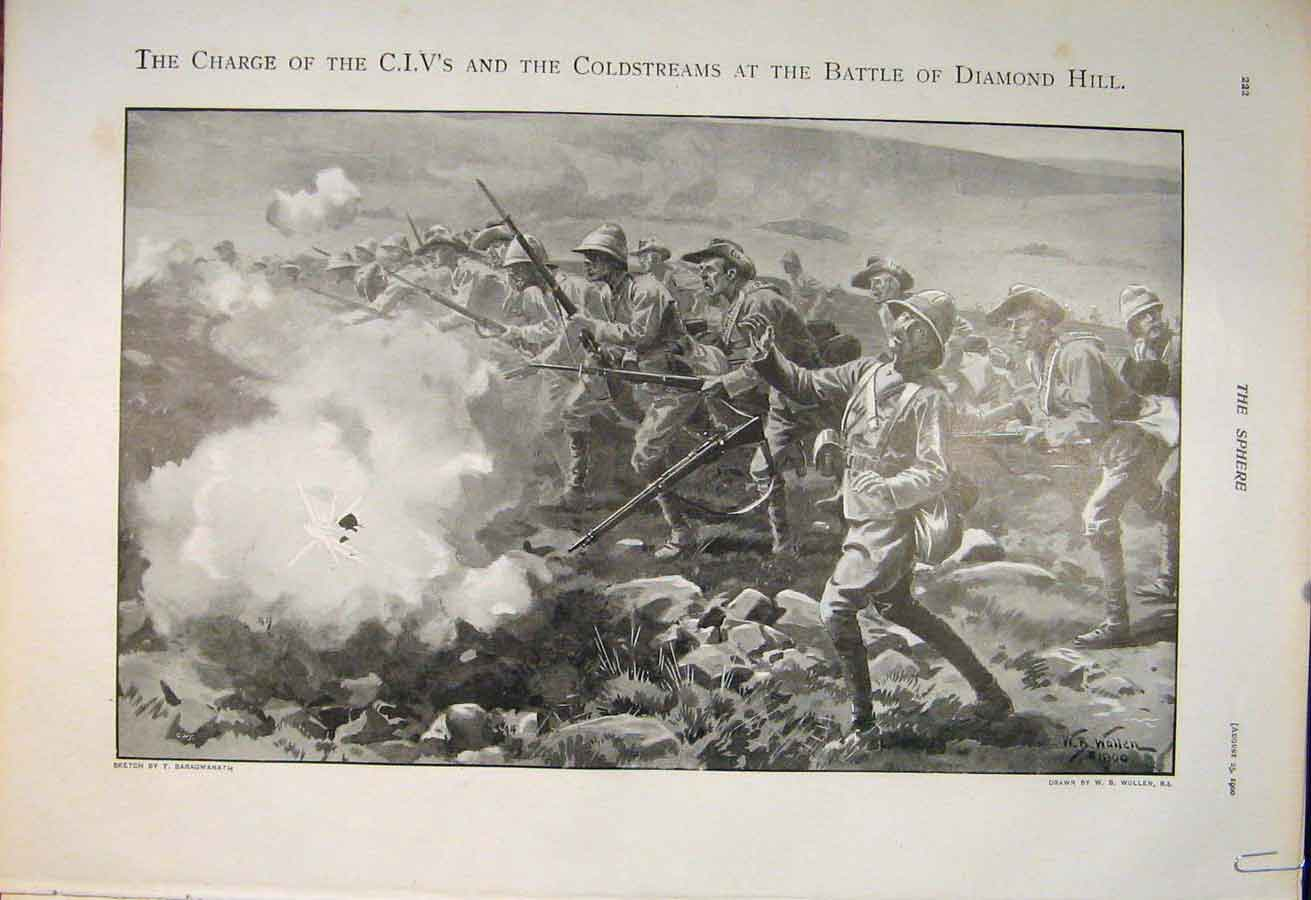
"The Charge of the CIV's and Coldstreams at the Battle of Diamond Hill"

== Written works ==
- Wollen, W.B., "Christmas at the Front: A reminiscence of Christmas at Modder River," Cassell's Magazine, Dec. 1900 – May 1901, pp. 112–115.

== Bibliography ==
- Harrington, Peter. (1993). British Artists and War: The Face of Battle in Paintings and Prints, 1700–1914. London: Greenhill.
- "War Pictures. How they are painted," The Regiment, 15 February 1902, pp. 308–309.
