= 1881–82 Home Nations rugby union matches =

The 1881–82 Home Nations rugby union matches were a series of international rugby football matches played between the England, Ireland, Scotland and Wales national rugby union teams. This was the last season before the introduction of the Home Nations Championship.

The only recognised competition held between the countries was the annual Calcutta Cup match, contested between England and Scotland. It was the fourth challenge for the trophy, and the first time Scotland won it, beating England by two tries to nil.

== Format ==
The matches for this season were decided on goals scored. A goal was awarded for a successful conversion after a try, for a dropped goal or for a goal from mark. If a game was drawn, any unconverted tries were tallied to give a winner. If there was still no clear winner, the match was declared a draw.

== Results ==
=== Ireland vs. Wales ===
28 January 1882

Ireland	0 – 2G, 4T	Wales
		Try: Evans; Bridie; Clapp; Baker Jones; Con: Lewis (2)

Lansdowne Road, Dublin
Referee: WJ Goulding (Ireland)

Ireland: RE McLean (NIFC), JR Atkinson, Thomas St. George McCarthy (Dublin University), WW Fletcher (Kingston), EH Greene (Dublin University), GC Bent (Dublin University), AJ Forrest (Wanderers) capt., JM Kennedy (Wanderers), F Kennedy (Wanderers), HB Morell (Dublin University), EA McCarthey (Kingstown), WA Wallis (Wanderers), AJ Downing (Dublin University), FS Heuston (Kingstown), RG Thompson (Lansdowne)

Wales: Charles Lewis (Llandovery College) capt., Samuel Clark (Neath), William Norton (Cardiff), Bill Evans (Rhymney), Charlie Newman (Newport), George Frederick Harding (Newport), James Bridie (Newport), Hugh Vincent (Bangor), Frank Purdon (Swansea) Tom Clapp (Nantyglo), Bob Gould (Newport), Thomas Baker Jones (Newport), William David Phillips (Cardiff), Tom Williams (Pontypridd), George Morris (Swansea)

This match was the first ever meeting between the two nations rugby union teams; and resulted in the first ever Welsh victory over international opposition. Ten of the Irish teams were new caps, which reflected the makeshift nature of the Irish team after ten of the original squad withdrew before the match. Kennedy of Ireland withdrew with an injury after half an hour of play and Atkinson took a serious injury to his nose. The match itself was frequently disrupted after disputes broke out from both sides, with Wales finishing victorious.

The sports correspondent from The Irish Times wrote a damning article in his match coverage, referring to the "dormant apathy" of the Irish team.

=== Ireland vs. England ===
6 February 1882

Ireland	2T – 2T	England
Try: Johnston; Stokes		Try: Bolton; Hunt

Lansdowne Road, Dublin
Referee: W.C. Neville (Ireland)

Ireland: RB Walkington (NIFC), RE McLean (Dublin University), EJ Wolfe (NIFC), WW Pike (Kingstown), M Johnston (Dublin University), GC Bent (Dublin University), AJ Forrest (Wanderers), JW Taylor (NIFC) capt., R Nelson (Queens's University), HB Morell (Dublin University), WEA Cummins (Cork), JA McDonald (Queen's University), RW Hughes (NIFC), TR Johnson-Smyth (Lansdowne), OS Stokes (Cork Bankers)

England: A. N. Hornby (Manchester), WN Bolton (Blackheath), E Beswick (Swinton), R Hunt (Manchester), HT Twynam (Richmond), HC Rowley (Manchester), JI Ward (Richmond), Charles Gurdon (Richmond) capt., BB Middleton (Birkenhead Park), Harry Vassall (Blackheath), Herbert Fuller (Bath), JT Hunt (Manchester), GT Thomson (Halifax), A Spurling (Blackheath), WW Hewitt (Queen's House)

=== Scotland vs. Ireland ===
18 February 1882

Scotland	2T – 0	Ireland
Try: Brown; McCowan

Hamilton Crescent, Glasgow
Referee: Alexander Petrie (Scotland)

Scotland: T Anderson (Merchiston), Bill Maclagan (Glasgow Academicals), F Hunter (Edinburgh University), WS Brown (Edinburgh Inst. FP), AGG Asher (Oxford University), G Macleod (Glasgow Academicals), R Ainslie (Edinburgh Inst. FP), C Reid (Edinburgh Academical), DY Cassels (West of Scotland) capt., D. Somerville (Edinburgh Inst. FP), D McCowan (West of Scotland), R Maitland (Edinburgh Inst. FP), T Ainslie(Edinburgh Inst. FP), AFC Gore (London Scottish), JB Brown (Glasgow Academicals)

Ireland: RB Walkington (NIFC), RE McLean (Dublin University), JR Atkinson (Dublin University), RW Morrow (Queens's University), WW Fletcher (Kingstown), J Pedlow (Bessbrook), AC O'Sulivan (Dublin University), JW Taylor (NIFC) capt., R Nelson (Queens's University), JBW Buchanan (Dublin University), W Finlay (NIFC), JA McDonald (Queen's University), RW Hughes (NIFC), G Scriven (Dublin University), J Johnston (Belfast Acads)

=== England vs. Scotland ===
4 March 1882

England	0 – 2T	Scotland
		Try: R Ainslie (2)

Whalley Range, Manchester
Referee: HL Robinson (Ireland)

England: A. N. Hornby (Manchester) capt., WN Bolton (Blackheath), E Beswick (Swinton), JH Payne (Broughton), HH Taylor (Blackheath), Charles Coates (Yorkshire Wanderers), WM Tatham (Oxford University), Charles Gurdon (Richmond), PA Newton (Blackheath), Harry Vassall (Oxford University), Herbert Fuller (Cambridge University), JT Hunt (Manchester), GT Thomson (Halifax), ET Gurdon (Richmond), HC Rowley (Manchester)

Scotland: JP Veitch (Royal HSFP), Bill Maclagan (Glasgow Academicals), A Philip (Edinburgh Inst. FP), WS Brown (Edinburgh Inst. FP), Andrew Ramsay Don-Wauchope (Cambridge University), Archibald Walker (West of Scotland), Robert Ainslie (Edinburgh Inst. FP), Charles Reid (Edinburgh Academical), DY Cassels (West of Scotland) capt., WA Walls (Glasgow Academicals), D McCowan (West of Scotland), Robert Maitland (Edinburgh Inst. FP), Thomas Ainslie (Edinburgh Inst. FP), JG Walker (West of Scotland), JB Brown (Glasgow Academicals)

At the fourth attempt, Scotland won the Calcutta Cup for the first time.

=== Wales vs. North of England ===
Although not a full international, the match between Wales and the North of England was important for the establishment of the Home Nations Championship the following season. In 1881, Wales had suffered such a crushing defeat at the hands of the English that it their readiness for full international participation was brought into question. In 1882 it was therefore decided to put a North of England team against them. The winning margin attained by the North was by just a goal to a try. This good form shown by the Welsh added to their victory over Ireland, gained for them a place in the International fixtures of the future.

14 January 1882

Wales	1T – 1G	North of England
Try: 1 Con: Drops:		Try: 1 Con: 1 Drops:

Newport

== Bibliography ==
- Griffiths, John (1987). The Phoenix Book of International Rugby Records. London: Phoenix House. ISBN 0-460-07003-7.
