= McCargo =

McCargo is a surname. Notable people with the surname include:

- Aaron McCargo, Jr. (born 1971), American chef
- Brian McCargo, Northern Irish police officer
- Duncan McCargo, British academic
- John McCargo (born 1983), American football player
- Marian McCargo (1932–2004), American tennis player and actor
- Thomas McCargo (c. 1790–aft. 1854), American slave trader
