= PSNI (disambiguation) =

PSNI may refer to:

- Police Service of Northern Ireland
  - PSNI F.C., a football club associated with the Police Service
  - PSNI GAA, a Gaelic games club associated with the Police Service
- Pharmaceutical Society of Northern Ireland
