= General Newton =

General Newton may refer to:

- John Newton (engineer) (1823–1895), Union Army major general
- Lloyd W. Newton (born 1942), U.S. Air Force four-star general
- Paul Raymond Newton (fl. 1970s–2010s), British Army lieutenant general
- Philip Newton (fl. 1910s), American-born Russian Ambulance Corps general during World War I
- Robert C. Newton (1840–1877), Confederate States Army acting brigadier general and later Arkansas State Militia major general
- William Newton (British Army officer) (died 1730), British Army brigadier general
