= Garda GAA =

Gaelic games club in County Dublin, Ireland

Garda GAA Club
- Founded: 1922
- County: Dublin
- Colours: Blue and White
- Grounds: Westmanstown
- Coordinates: 53°22′34.36″N 6°26′53.65″W

Playing kits
Standard colours

Senior Club Championships
	All Ireland	Leinster champions	Dublin champions
Football:	-	-	6
Hurling:	-	-	6

Garda GAA is a Gaelic Athletic Association club based in Dublin, Ireland, founded in 1922. They are the GAA representative team of the Garda Síochána. Garda have won the Dublin Senior Football Championship on six occasions in 1927, 1929, 1933, 1934, 1935 and 1948. Garda won the Dublin Intermediate Football Championship on one occasion in 1986, bringing them back to senior status. Garda have also had success as a hurling side, having also won the Dublin Senior Hurling Championship on six occasions in 1931, 1929, 1928, 1927, 1926 and 1925. Westmanstown Gaels is the juvenile division of the club and was set up in 2005.

== History ==
The Garda GAA was founded in 1922 shortly after the Civic Guard, later renamed the Garda Síochána, was established to replace the Royal Irish Constabulary, with responsibility for policing the newly established Irish Free State. The first Garda Commissioner, Eoin O'Duffy, supported the creation of the club as a way to engage with the community, aiding community policing. There were originally doubts as to whether officers of the Gardaí could join the Gaelic Athletic Association, due to Rule 21 banning Crown servants or British security services joining, however the GAA interpreted it to allow members of the Garda Síochána and Irish Army to join. O'Duffy also encouraged promising young Gaelic games players to join the police side in Dublin so they were eligible to play for Dublin GAA in county matches. When Dublin won the 1927 All-Ireland Senior Hurling Championship Final at Croke Park against Cork GAA, they had fourteen Garda members on their team, a record for the number of county players from the same club. Membership was originally only open to serving members of the Garda but this restriction was later removed.

Since 2002, Garda GAA have played an annual match against the Police Service of Northern Ireland's PSNI GAA following the abolition of Rule 21. They play for the McCarthy cup named after Thomas St George McCarthy, a Royal Irish Constabulary policeman who helped to found the GAA. In 2005, they united with Westmanstown Gaels youth team to provide youth Gaelic games at Garda for the first time.
