= Herbert Fuller =

England international rugby union player

- Born: Herbert George Fuller; 4 October 1856 Bath, Somerset, England
- Died: 2 January 1896 (aged 39) Streatham, England
- School: Christ's College, Finchley
- University: Peterhouse, Cambridge

Rugby union career
- Position: Forward
Amateur team(s)
Years	Team	Apps	(Points)
- Cambridge University R.U.F.C.
International career
Years	Team	Apps	(Points)
1882–1884	England	6	(0)

Herbert George Fuller (4 October 1856 – 2 January 1896) was an English born rugby union forward who played club rugby for Cambridge University and won four international caps for the England national rugby union team between 1882 and 1884.

== Early life ==
Fuller was born in Bath in 1856, and was educated at Christ's College, Finchley before graduating to Peterhouse, Cambridge in 1876. While at Peterhouse, he rowed for Peterhouse Boat Club. He received his BA in 1880 and his MA in 1883.

== Rugby career ==
Fuller first came to note as a rugby player while representing Cambridge University, and represented the university club in six Varsity matches between 1878 and 1883. His six Sporting Blues won was a record for rugby union at Cambridge. In 1882 Fuller was selected to represent England in a friendly match against Ireland played at Lansdowne Road. The game ended in a disappointing draw for England but the selectors kept their faith in Fuller, reselecting him for the next game that season, at home to Scotland. Scotland beat England by two tries to nil, taking the Calcutta Cup for the first time in four attempts.

The next year saw the introduction of the Home Nations Championship; Fuller played in all three matches, which England won. This made England the first holders of the Championship title, and furthermore the first Triple Crown winning team. Fuller played just one more international when he was selected to face Wales as part of the 1884 Championship, a home win played at Leeds.
