= William Hunt (rugby union) =

England international rugby union player

- Full name: William Henry Hunt
- Born: 11 May 1854 Preston, England
- Died: 13 May 1904 (aged 50) Manchester, England
- Height: 6 ft 3 in (191 cm)
- Notable relative(s): James Hunt (brother); Robert Hunt (brother)

Rugby union career
- Position: Forward
International career
Years	Team	Apps	(Points)
1876–78	England	4	(0)

William Henry Hunt (11 May 1854 – 13 May 1904) was an English international rugby union player.

Hunt was the son of a Preston wine and spirit merchant and grew up in the nearby village of Longton. He had four younger brothers, including rugby players James and Robert, who were both capped for England in the 1880s. A strongly built 6 ft 3 in forward, Hunt played his early rugby for Manchester and later joined the Preston Grasshoppers. He was capped four times in international rugby for England between 1876 and 1878.

Outside of rugby, Hunt was involved in his father's business and had many years of volunteer service with the 5th Lancashire Royal Artillery, attaining the rank of colonel by the time he retired around the turn of the century.

== See also ==
- List of England national rugby union players
