= Bill Evans (rugby union) =

Wales international rugby union player

- Born: William Frederick Evans; 24 April 1857 Rhymney, Wales
- Died: 1 July 1935 (aged 78)
- School: Christ College, Brecon; Sherborne School
- University: Jesus College, Oxford
- Occupation: teacher

Rugby union career
- Position: Three-quarters
Amateur team(s)
Years	Team	Apps	(Points)
- Oxford University RFC
- Rhymney RFC
- Cardiff RFC
1880–1883	Newport RFC		
–	Gloucester		
International career
Years	Team	Apps	(Points)
1881	Wales	2	(0)

William Frederick Evans (24 April 1857 – 1 July 1935) was a Welsh international rugby union player, who won two caps for Wales in 1882 and 1883.

== Rugby career ==
Evans was born in Rhymney, Monmouthshire. He was educated at Christ College, Brecon, Sherborne School and Jesus College, Oxford, representing Oxford University rugby club (but did not win a "Blue").

He was a three-quarter and represented the Wales national rugby union team on two occasions. His debut for Wales was in a friendly on 28 January 1882 against Ireland. In the following season, he played against Scotland in the Home Nations Championship.

== Later life ==
After his rugby career in Wales, Evans moved to Gloucestershire, where he began teaching. He later emigrated to Australia, and continued his teaching career, becoming headmaster of Fremantle Grammar School from 1887 to 1890 and then Adelaide Grammar School from 1890 to 1891. Evans continued his teaching after returning to Wales, but in his latter life became homeless, living rough in the hills surrounding his home town. He died in 1935.

== Bibliography ==
- Jenkins, John M.; et al. (1991). Who's Who of Welsh International Rugby Players. Wrexham: Bridge Books. ISBN 1-872424-10-4.
