= Naomh Pádraig GAA (London) =

British Gaelic games club

- CLG Naomh Pádraig
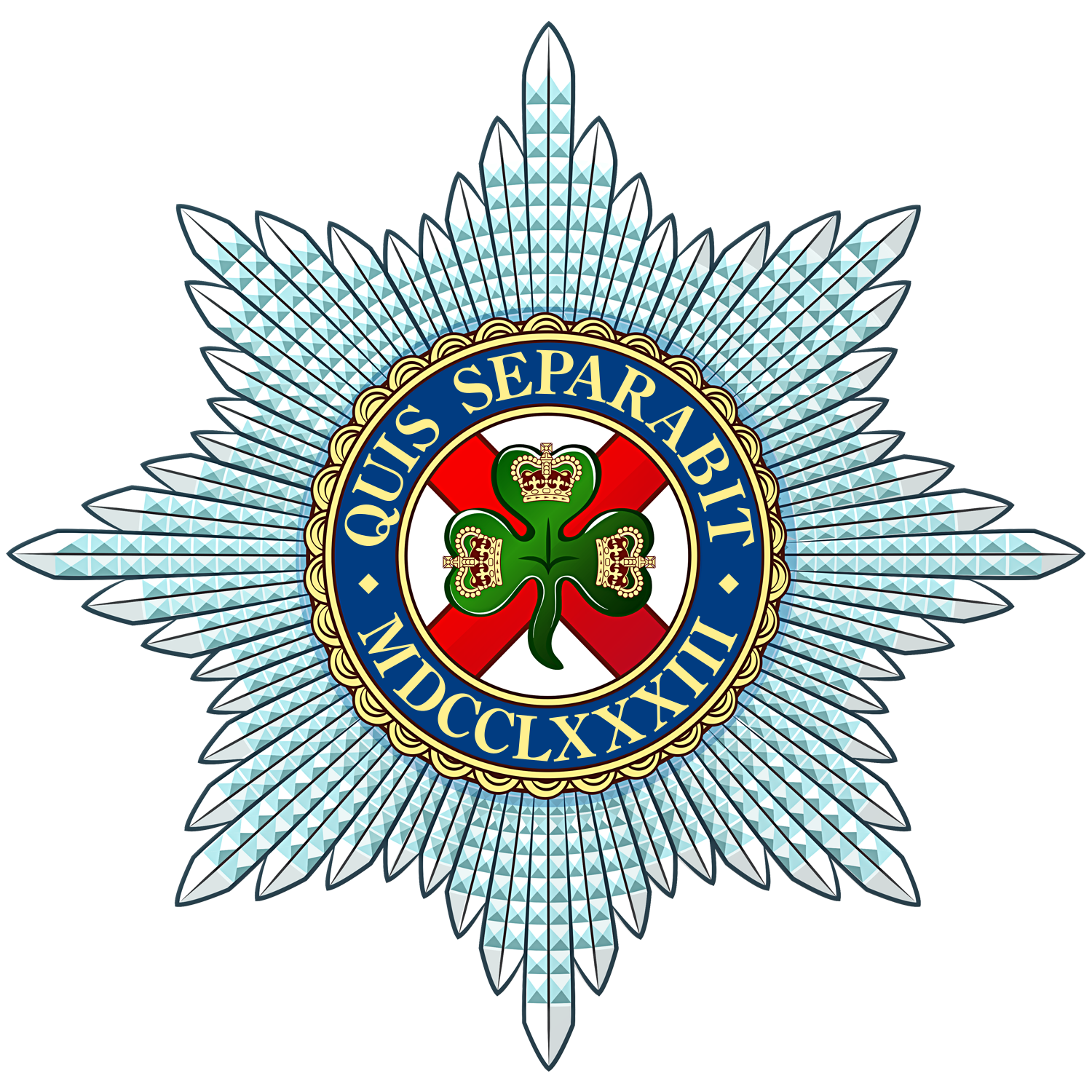
- Founded: 2015
- County: London
- Nickname: The Micks
- Colours: Black and green
- Grounds: Hounslow Barracks, London

Playing kits
Standard colours

Naomh Pádraig GAA is a British Gaelic games club based in London, England. Founded in 2015 as Irish Guards GAA and renamed the following year, they are the representative Gaelic Athletic Association (GAA) team for the Irish Guards regiment of the British Army, and are the first British army club in Gaelic football after the lifting of a ban on members of the British military playing Gaelic games. They are affiliated to the London GAA.

== Background ==
Prior to 2001, the Gaelic Athletic Association had rule 21 in their official rulebook which prohibited members of the British armed forces from being members of the association or playing Gaelic games. In 2001, the GAA voted in favour of removing rule 21 despite five of the six county boards of Northern Ireland voting against it. The removal of the rule meant that British security and police forces were now able to join the GAA. The Police Service of Northern Ireland, following their reconstitution from the Royal Ulster Constabulary, formed PSNI GAA as the first team for British security services who had previously been prohibited from playing.

== History ==
In 2015, the Irish Guards moved their barracks from Aldershot, Hampshire to Hounslow in London. During a tour of Afghanistan, members of the Irish Guards brought GAA jerseys and hurls with them and a suggestion was made about them having their own team. Following their tour, they applied to the London GAA for membership to be able to play in the London Junior Football Championships. They also wanted to join so that Fijian born soldiers could play "a strong physical game that would suit them". However membership would not be restricted to serving soldiers and would be an open club.

The case for the Irish Guards GAA was made by County Waterford-born Major Ken Fox in a presentation to the London GAA. When the London GAA voted on permitting the Irish Guards to join the county board, there was a split vote 15–15. The London GAA chairman Noel O'Sullivan used his casting vote to permit the Irish Guards membership. He justified his support for the Irish Guards, stating "I just chose what I believe leads to the betterment of London and to the GAA in general." Following their affiliation, members of the Irish Guards GAA team attended Setanta GFC's kit launch as well as to support their bid for affiliation with a British county board after London GAA had rejected them on proximity grounds.

In January 2016, Granuaile GAA moved a motion at the next London GAA meeting to expel the Irish Guards GAA from the county board. However, the Central Board of the GAA intervened to veto the motion stating that there were no grounds by which a motion in support of a club's affiliation could be rescinded. The Irish Guards GAA was founded in 2015 and played their first match against Tír Chonaill Gaels in March 2016, fielding players from both Northern Ireland and the Republic of Ireland.
