= Rule 21 =

Former Gaelic Athletic Association rule banning members of the British security forces

Rule 21 of the Gaelic Athletic Association (GAA) was a rule in force from 1897 to 2001 which banned members of the British security forces from membership of the GAA and thus from playing Gaelic games. The affected organisations included the British Armed Forces and the Royal Ulster Constabulary (RUC), and prior to partition, the Royal Irish Constabulary (RIC) and Dublin Metropolitan Police. As well as the RUC in Northern Ireland, it also applied to police forces in Great Britain, which affected London GAA and the other British GAA affiliates.

Rule 21 stated:

Members of the British armed forces or police shall not be eligible for membership of the Association.
A member of the Association participating in dances, or similar entertainment, promoted by or under the patronage of such bodies, shall incur suspension of at least three months.

The rule was abolished after the establishment of the Police Service of Northern Ireland (PSNI) as part of the Northern Ireland peace process.

== Origin ==
Rule 21 was introduced in 1897 and reflected the rise of "advanced nationalism", with the GAA and other Irish nationalist organisations founded in the Gaelic revival becoming more politicised and separatist in the build-up to the revolutionary period. It was intended to allay fears that RIC members were joining GAA clubs to spy on members' political activities. It was overshadowed by the introduction in 1901 of Rule 27, commonly called "The Ban", which prohibited GAA members from playing "foreign games" like soccer and rugby union. In 1938 Douglas Hyde, recently inaugurated as first President of Ireland, was removed as Patron of the GAA after attending an Irish soccer international. After Rule 27 was abolished in 1971, it was Rule 21 and Rule 42, which prohibited foreign games being played at GAA grounds, which were the focus of debate.

== Northern Ireland ==
After the 1922 creation of the Irish Free State, Rule 21 continued to apply in Northern Ireland. Its strongest supporters were physical force republicans, and during the Troubles the GAA was suspected by many unionists of collusion with the Provisional IRA and other paramilitaries. While some advocates of Rule 21 were opposed to any engagement with "Crown forces", others linked it to alleged targeting by the security forces of the GAA, in particular the occupation of part of Crossmaglen Rangers' grounds by a British Army base, which disrupted matches and other events there. One player affected by the ban was Brian McCargo from Ardoyne, who played for Antrim county team before being obliged to quit in 1969 after joining the RUC Reserve, during a period after the abolition of the B Specials when some Catholic community leaders were encouraging Catholics to join the revised force. Sean McNulty from Warrenpoint won an All-Ireland minor medal in 1977 but joined the RUC in 1982. The Sports Council for Northern Ireland and Northern Ireland Department of Education made funding grants to GAA bodies while Rule 21 was in force, but at a lower level than would otherwise have been the case.

== Abolition ==
During the Northern Ireland peace process, abolishing Rule 21 was advocated by unionists, political leaders in the Republic, and the Independent Commission on Policing in Northern Ireland, whose report led to the replacement of the RUC by the PSNI. This was for two reasons: to boost nationalist trust of the police, and to improve unionist trust of the GAA. Nationalists were underrepresented in the RUC, contributing to a self-sustaining cycle of mistrust of it as unionist-biased; on the other hand, unionists saw Rule 21 as evidence of the GAA's support for republican violence. If the GAA ended its prohibition on membership, a reformed police force would be more likely to attract nationalist recruits. The prospect of unionist police officers joining the GAA was not a major consideration.

Motions at the GAA congress to change a given rule can only be raised once every three years and require a two-thirds majority of delegates. Motion 43 submitted to the 1995 annual congress proposed to remove Rule 21, but was withdrawn before any debate. As a compromise for withdrawing motion 43, congress agreed that a special congress could be called in future purely to vote on Rule 21. Such a congress was held in the Burlington Hotel on 30 May 1998, shortly after the Good Friday Agreement. After a debate closed to the public, it rejected immediate abolition due to strong opposition from the Ulster Council, but resolved to remove it "when effective steps are taken to implement amended structures and policing arrangements envisaged in the British/Irish peace agreement". Another special congress in Citywest abolished it, on 17 November 2001, two weeks after the PSNI was established. Seán McCague, the GAA president, was personally in favour and all delegates from the Republic supported abolition; although only Down GAA of the six Northern Ireland counties voted in favour, the Ulster delegates felt the establishment of the PSNI had sufficiently altered the situation not to make more than a token objection. A poll of Northern nationalists found that 57% supported abolition, with 25% opposed.

The British Universities GAA joined the British Universities Sports Association in February 2002; its application had been rejected five times before the abolition of Rule 21. A PSNI GAA club was founded in 2002 and since that year has played an annual Gaelic football match against the Garda GAA for the Thomas St George McCarthy Cup, called after an RIC officer who was a founder member of the GAA in 1884. After Ronan Kerr was killed in 2011 by dissident republicans, his Beragh Red Knights GAA teammates bore his coffin before passing it to his PSNI colleagues. In 2015, the British army regiment the Irish Guards formed Irish Guards GAA to take part in London junior championships.
