= Aubrey Spurling =

- Born: 19 July 1856 Camberwell, England
- Died: 26 March 1945 (aged 88) Maidstone, England

Rugby union career
- Position: Forward
International career
Years	Team	Apps	(Points)
1882	England	1	(0)

Aubrey Spurling (19 July 1856 – 26 March 1945) was an English international rugby union player.

A forward, Spurling played his rugby with Blackheath F.C. and was capped once for England, appearing in their 1882 match against Ireland at Lansdowne Road. He became the official club historian for Blackheath.

== See also ==
- List of England national rugby union players
