= Robert Hunt (rugby union, born 1856) =

England international rugby union player

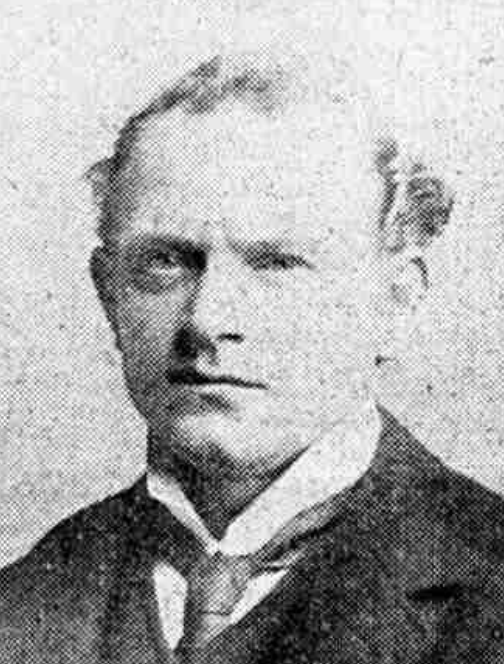
- Born: 21 January 1856 Preston, England
- Died: 19 March 1913 (aged 57) Blackburn, England
- Height: 6 ft (183 cm)
- Weight: 12.4 st (174 lb; 79 kg)
- Notable relative(s): James Hunt (brother); William Hunt (brother)
- Occupation: Doctor

Rugby union career
- Position: Three-quarter
International career
Years	Team	Apps	(Points)
1880–82	England	4	

Robert Hunt (21 January 1856 – 19 March 1913) was an English international rugby union player.

== Biography ==
Hunt grew up in Preston, Lancashire, and was the second eldest of five brothers. Two of them, Tom and William, were capped for England as forwards, but Hunt was himself a speedy three-quarter, although not too dissimilar in size to his brothers. He was a noted exponent of the drop goal. While a Preston Grasshoppers player, Hunt earned representative honours with Lancashire for the first time in 1878. His international career spanned from 1880 to 1882, for a total of four caps. He later had stints with Manchester and Blackheath.

A graduate of Owen's College in Manchester, Hunt became a physician and surgeon at Manchester Royal Infirmary upon obtaining his medical qualifications. He also spend a period as medical officer at Monsall Fever Hospital. After moving to Blackburn, Hunt was an honorary surgeon at the East Lancashire Infirmary for more than two decades.

Hunt died of pneumonia in 1913, at the age of 57.

== See also ==
- List of England national rugby union players
