= PSNI GAA =

Antrim-based Gaelic games club

- Seirbhís Póilíneachta Thuaisceart Éireann
- Founded: 2002
- County: Antrim
- Colours: Red and green
- Grounds: Newforge Sports Complex, Newforge Lane, Belfast
- Coordinates: 54.557698°N 5.943097°W

Playing kits
Standard colours

Police Service of Northern Ireland GAA, also known as PSNI GAA, is a Gaelic Games club based in Northern Ireland. The club was set up in 2002 for members of the Police Service of Northern Ireland, with the intent to allow serving police officers to play Gaelic games following the abolition of Rule 21, which had prohibited them from doing so. They are based at Newforge Lane in Belfast alongside other teams affiliated with the RUC Athletic Association. They are affiliated with Antrim GAA and play in their Inter-Firms League. On 18 October 2019 they capped off their most successful year with a win of the Tom Langan trophy for the first time in their history.

== History ==
Prior to 2001, the Gaelic Athletic Association had rule 21 in its statutes, stating that members of the British security services or police forces were not permitted to be members of the GAA. This precluded police officers from the Royal Ulster Constabulary (RUC) from being able to play Gaelic games. In 2001, the ban was lifted, despite five of the county boards of the six counties of Northern Ireland voting against lifting it; Down GAA voted in favour. The RUC reconstituted itself as the PSNI and in 2002, set up its own GAA team which they were able to do following the abolition of rule 21.

On 30 October 2002, PSNI played their first Gaelic football match against Garda GAA in Dublin, Republic of Ireland. The match was played in secret with the players' names not being revealed despite the Chief Constable of Northern Ireland attending. This would become a regular fixture with the two police forces playing for the McCarthy Cup, named after Thomas St George McCarthy who was a Royal Irish Constabulary policeman and founder of the GAA. In 2006, PSNI GAA set up a hurling team.

In 2007, the PSNI joined the Antrim Inter-Firms League despite warnings that PSNI players at other clubs wanted to remain discreet about their careers after playing for PSNI in challenge games. For security purposes, PSNI players' names are not disclosed when they play. In 2011, the PSNI played Garda at the headquarters of the GAA, Croke Park. PSNI have also played in the Police Gaelic Football Tournament against teams from the New York Police Department and the Metropolitan Police.
