= Brian McCargo =

Brian McCargo OBE QPM is a retired Chief Superintendent with the Royal Ulster Constabulary.

A Roman Catholic native of the nationalist Ardoyne district of Belfast, McCargo was quoted as saying, "I had to leave my home in the Ardoyne, put my life and my family's at risk, but I have absolutely no regrets about joining the Royal Ulster Constabulary".

Heavily involved with the Gaelic Athletic Association, when he joined the RUC he was forced to sever his links under the GAA's controversial Rule 21, which was repealed in 2001.

He was awarded the Queen's Police Medal (QPM) in the Queen's Birthday Honours List of 1998. He is currently the chairman and regional director of Special Olympics Northern Ireland. He was appointed Officer of the Order of the British Empire (OBE) in the 2009 New Year Honours for his services to sport.
