= Edmund Beswick =

English rugby union footballer (1858–1911)

- Full name: Edmund Beswick
- Born: June→September 1858 Penrith, Cumberland, England
- Died: 23 January 1911 (aged 52–53) Salford, Lancashire, England

Rugby union career
- Position: Three-quarters
Senior career
| Years | Team | Apps | (Points) |
| 1879-86 | Swinton | 105 | |
| 1879- | Lancashire | | |
International career
| Years | Team | Apps | (Points) |
| 1882 | England | 2 | (0) |

Edmund Beswick (birth registered July→September 1858 – died 23 January 1911) was an English rugby union footballer who played in the 1870s and 1880s. He played at representative level for England, and Lancashire, and at club level for Swinton, as a Three-quarter, i.e. wing or inside centre. Prior to Tuesday 2 June 1896, Swinton was a rugby union club.

== Background ==
Beswick was born in Penrith, Cumberland, England, and he died aged 52 in Salford, Lancashire, England.

== Playing career ==
Beswick won caps for England while at Swinton in 1882 against Ireland, and Scotland. He won caps for Lancashire while at Swinton, making his début against Cheshire on Saturday 29 November 1879; in 1881 he was selected for the North versus the South.
