= James Hunt (rugby union) =

England international rugby union player

- Full name: James Thomas Hunt
- Born: 14 February 1858 Longton, Preston, England
- Died: 5 October 1924 (aged 66) Warreanga, Wye, South Australia, Australia
- Notable relative(s): Robert Hunt (brother); William Hunt (brother)

Rugby union career
- Position: Forward
International career
Years	Team	Apps	(Points)
1882–84	England	3	(0)

James Thomas Hunt (14 February 1858 – 5 October 1924) was an English international rugby union player.

Born and raised in Preston, Lancashire, Hunt was a younger brother of England internationals Robert and William. He was a forward like his brother William and played his rugby for Manchester. Capped three times for England, Hunt made his international debut against Ireland at Lansdowne Road in 1882.

Hunt immigrated to Australia and worked as an overseer of several estates, mainly in western Victoria. He spent his final years living on the "Warreanga" property in the South Australian locality of Wye.

== See also ==
- List of England national rugby union players
