= William Neville (rugby union) =

Irish rugby union player (1855–1904)

- Full name: William Cox Neville
- Born: 1855
- Died: 1904 (aged 48–49)
- University: Trinity College Dublin
- Occupation: Obstetrician

Rugby union career
- Position: Forward
International career
Years	Team	Apps	(Points)
1879	Ireland	2	(0)

William Cox Neville (1855–1904) was an Irish international rugby union player.

== Life ==
Hailing from Dundalk, County Louth, Neville was the son of a civil engineer and attended Dundalk College.

== Rugby career ==
Neville captained Ireland in both of his two internationals, against Scotland at Belfast and England at The Oval in 1879, playing as a forward. He was also a referee, officiating Ireland's match against England in 1882, and served as the inaugural president of the Irish Rugby Football Union.

== Medical education and career ==
A medical graduate of Trinity College Dublin, Neville specialised in gynaecology, until spending time away from the profession due to poor health, then was later involved in pathology.

== See also ==
- List of Ireland national rugby union players
