= O'Flaherty V.C. =

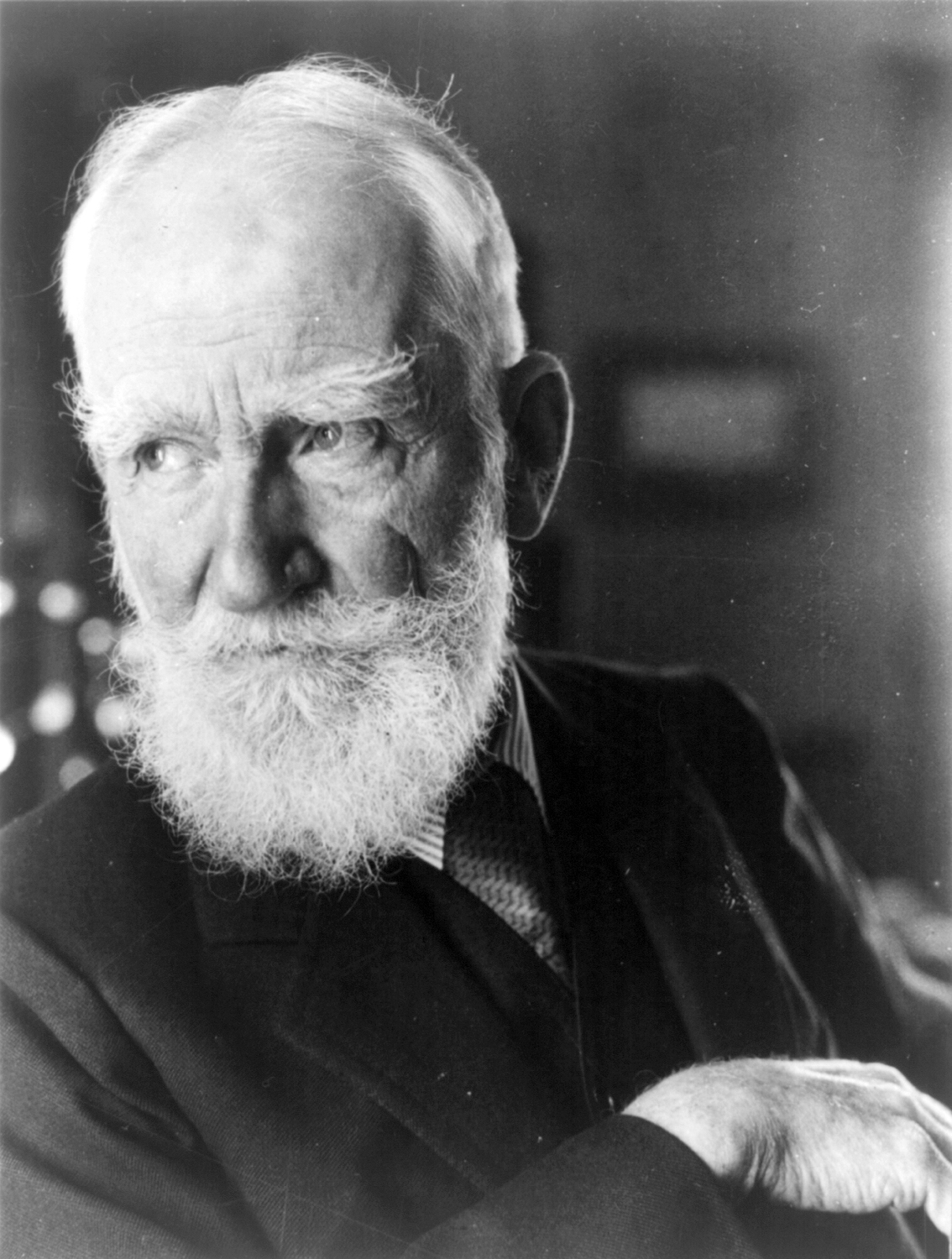
- Written by: George Bernard Shaw
- Original language: English
- Genre: satire
- Setting: Ireland

Premiere
- Date premiered: 17 February 1917
- Place premiered: Belgium, officers of the Royal Flying Corps

O'Flaherty V.C., A Recruiting Pamphlet (1915) is a comic one-act play written during World War I by George Bernard Shaw. The plot is about an Irish soldier in the British army returning home after winning the Victoria Cross. The play was written at a time when the British government was promoting recruitment in Ireland, while many Irish republicans expressed opposition to fighting in the war.

== Characters ==
- Dennis O'Flaherty, Irish soldier
- Teresa Driscoll, his girlfriend
- Mrs O'Flaherty, his mother
- General Sir Pearce Madigan, his commanding officer

== Preface ==
In the preface Shaw argues that most soldiers do not enlist for patriotic reasons, but through a desire for adventure, or to get away from a restricted life. This is especially true of the Irish, since an Irishman's hopes and opportunities depend on "getting out of Ireland". He adds that recruitment was nevertheless at a low ebb in 1915, as it had been "badly bungled... The Irish were for the most part Roman Catholics and loyal Irishmen, which means that from the English point of view they were heretics and rebels." Shaw said that he gave his character a self-serving girlfriend and a harridan of a mother ("a Volumnia of the potato-patch") in order to emphasise the kind of poverty and poor quality of life from which poor youths fled to join up.

== Plot ==
Dennis O'Flaherty, winner of the Victoria Cross for his outstanding bravery, has returned home to his local village to take part in a recruitment campaign. In conversation with General Pearce Madigan, the local squire, O'Flaherty admits that he had not told his Fenian mother that he would be fighting for the British side in the war, not against it. Madigan says he must explain to her why the war is being fought, and that even Republicans should help in the struggle against German oppression. O'Flaherty says he's no idea why the war is being fought, he just joined up to get away from home, but one thing he's become convinced of is that patriotism is part of the problem: "You'll never have a quiet world till you knock the patriotism out of the human race".

His mother appears, incensed to discover he has been fighting for the British. But she's even more horrified when Dennis' girlfriend, Teresa, arrives, expecting that the V.C. comes with a large payout in cash. She's dismayed to learn that the government may only give him a pension if he is wounded first. Still, she thinks it will be worth it, even if he does have to be badly wounded. Dennis says he's sick of life in provincial Ireland. Since he has experienced France, he never wants to come back. He hopes he can get a French wife. Teresa is outraged. When Mrs O'Flaherty discovers that her son gave Teresa a valuable gold watch, she launches into a tirade and the two women berate each other mercilessly. O'Flaherty says he can't wait to get back to the peace and quiet of the trenches. General Madigan sympathises, commenting, "Do you think that we should have got an army without conscription if domestic life had been as happy as people say it is?"

== Context and productions ==
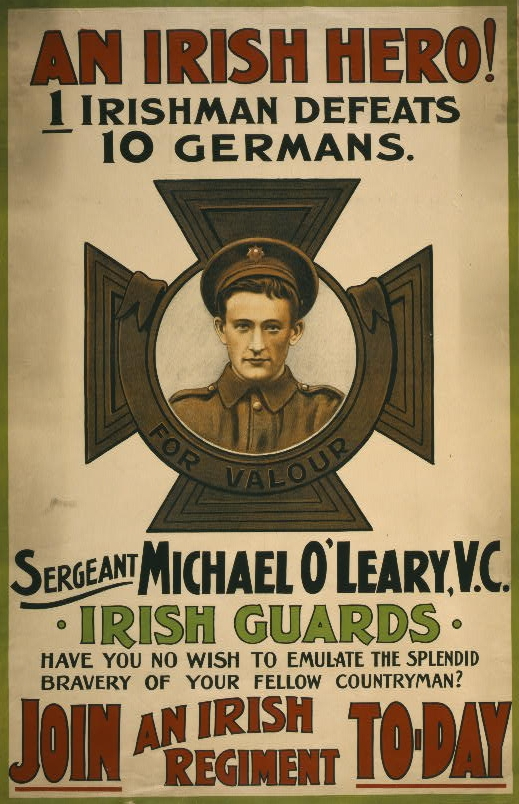
A recruiting poster depicting Irish war hero Michael John O'Leary

O'Flaherty's exploits in the war and role in recruiting drives are based on those of Irish Catholic Victoria Cross winner Michael John O'Leary. In February 1915 O'Leary had captured two German barricades, killing the gun crew of the first and capturing the second after running out of ammunition. O'Leary had been given a grand reception attended by thousands of Londoners in Hyde Park on 10 July 1915. Recruitment was a highly divisive subject in Ireland at the time. O'Leary was also greeted by cheering crowds in his home town of Macroom, but he was jeered by Ulster Volunteers at a recruitment drive in Ballaghaderrin during the autumn of 1915. This treatment caused such a scandal that it was raised in the Houses of Parliament in December. Like O'Flaherty's mother, O'Leary's father was a fervent Irish nationalist.

The play was intended for the Abbey Theatre in Dublin, which was suffering financially in the war, but the play's anti-war message led to a wartime ban on performance by the military authorities in Ireland. Shaw later wrote to Yeats that he was not sure that the play would work there anyway, and that St John Ervine, who was to have played the lead role, was not suited to the part. The first production was an amateur performance put on by officers of the Royal Flying Corps in Belgium. The first professional production was by the Incorporated Stage Society at the Lyric Theatre, Hammersmith, 20 December 1920. It was paired with H. O. Meredith's Forerunners. On 20 November 1924 Shaw himself gave a radio broadcast version of the play.

== Critical views ==
Beatrice Webb wrote in her diary that "O'Flaherty V.C. is a brilliant but serious piece of work—a jewel of a one-act play." Stephen Murray in English War Plays of the First World War, says that "Shaw tackles the issues of the war in a juxtaposition of serious and inconsequential subject-matter and tones which in many ways do take away from the important points he wishes to disclose. These fragment the unity of theme and mood." Shaw's friend Archibald Henderson says that "The Irish peasants are portrayed as hopelessly insular and sadly benighted. Their prejudice against the British is bitter and incorrigible." Bernard Dukore notes that the play "vividly contrasts as background the poverty of the lower-class Irish with the prosperity of the landed Anglo-Irish ascendancy. Because O'Flaherty's mother nursed the son of Sir Pearce, she had to bring up her own daughter on the bottle. When Sir Pearce mentions a citizen's obligation to king and country, O'Flaherty comments, 'Well, sir, to you that have an estate in it, it would feel like your country. But the devil a perch of it ever I owned.'"
