= Philip Newton =

American physician

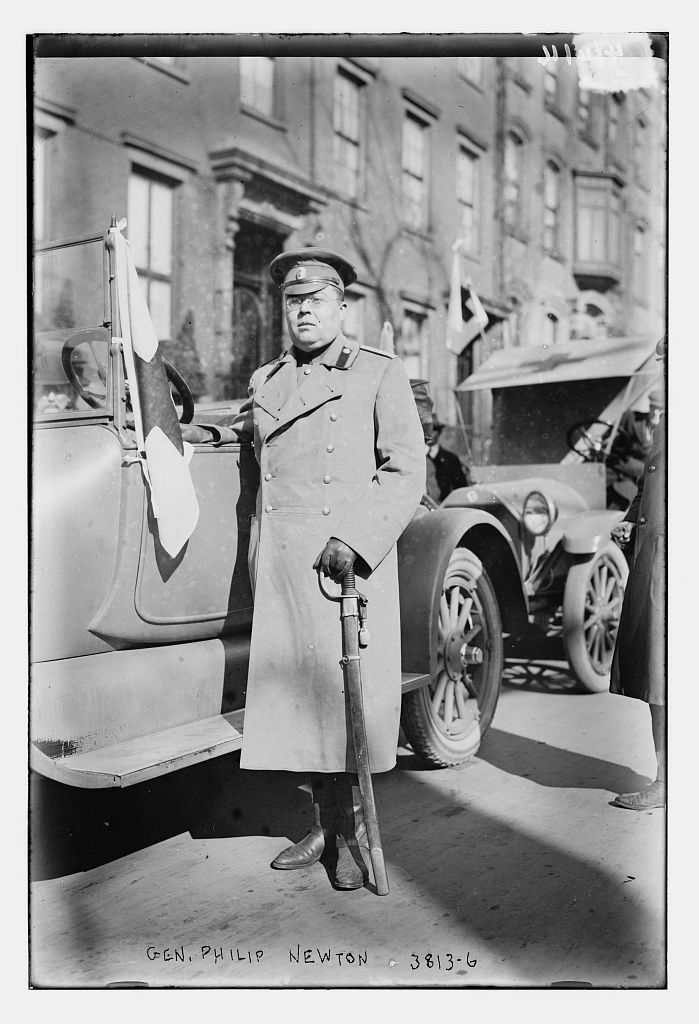
Philip Newton, M.D. on April 10, 1916

Philip Newton, M.D. was an American who served with the Russian ambulance corps during World War I and was promoted to a General by Nicholas II.

== Biography ==
He attended the United States Military Academy at West Point, New York.

While in Russia in 1915 he married Helene Shahofskaya.
