= Thomas St George McCarthy =

Thomas St George McCarthy (1862–1943) was an Ireland rugby union international and founder member of the Gaelic Athletic Association, being present at Hayes Hotel, Thurles, County Tipperary, Ireland at the Association's inaugural meeting on 1 November 1884. He was born at Bansha, Tipperary. His father, George McCarthy (1832–1902), Lieutenant of the Revenue Police, County Inspector of the RIC and Resident Magistrate, was from County Kerry.

At the foundation of the GAA, McCarthy was a District Inspector of the Royal Irish Constabulary based at Templemore, County Tipperary. He moved to Dublin in 1877 and became a friend of Michael Cusack, who had a cramming school. He was coached by Cusack for an RIC cadetship examination in 1882, in which he took first place. In 1881, he joined Dublin University Football Club and was capped against Wales in 1882. Later in 1882, he was a member of the Dublin University team which won the Leinster Senior Cup, the inaugural year of this competition. He also played soccer for Limavady FC when he was stationed in the town in 1888, and captained both the town's football and cricket clubs. He was a double winner of the County Londonderry senior cup in football and the inaugural County Londonderry Senior cricket cup final in 1888. He rose to become vice-president of the North West of Ireland Football Association and captain of the County Londonderry representative cricket side that played against the Northern Cricket Union.

He had a great love of the game of hurling, which he witnessed being played in his native village by the local enthusiasts who were later to form the Galtee Rovers GAA Hurling and Football club. He was a regular attender at matches in Croke Park to where he travelled from his home at Oakley Road in the Dublin suburb of Ranelagh. He died in 1943 and was buried without fanfare in an unmarked grave in Deansgrange Cemetery, Dublin, though there is a family plot in the old graveyard at Bansha village, where his sister, Kathleen McCarthy, is interred. Unlike the other six founding members of the GAA, very little has been done to commemorate McCarthy. GAA authorities have erected a commemorative gravestone at Deansgrange where it was unveiled on Wednesday, 18 November 2009, as part of the "Re-dedication of Founder's Graves" programme to mark the 125th Anniversary of the founding of the GAA, and there have also been calls for more recognition of his contribution to the GAA.

The Garda Síochána and the Police Service of Northern Ireland have honoured McCarthy by presenting the Thomas St George McCarthy Cup for competition by members of the Garda GAA (Garda Thirds) and the Police Service of Northern Ireland.
