= 1999–2000 Glasgow Warriors season =

Glasgow Warriors 1999 / 2000
- Ground(s): Hughenden Stadium; McDiarmid Park; Rubislaw Playing Fields; Millbrae, Alloway; Bridgehaugh Park; Caledonian Stadium, Inverness
- Coach: (Scotland) Richie Dixon
- Captain: (Scotland) Andy Nicol
- Most caps: (Scotland) Alan Bulloch (Cook Islands) Tommy Hayes (29)
- Top scorer: (Cook Islands) Tommy Hayes (294)
- Most tries: (Scotland) Gordon Simpson (9)
- League(s): 1999-2000 Scottish Inter-District Championship; 1999-2000 Welsh-Scottish League
- 1st 10th
Team kit

The 1999–2000 season is the fourth in the history of the Glasgow Warriors as a professional side. During this season the young professional side competed as Glasgow Caledonians.

This season saw Glasgow Caledonians compete in the competitions: the Welsh-Scottish League and the European Champions Cup, the Heineken Cup.

== Team ==
=== Coaches ===
- Head coach: (Scotland) Richie Dixon
- Assistant coach: (New Zealand) Gordon Macpherson
- Assistant coach: (Scotland) Rob Moffat

=== Squad ===
Hookers (Scotland) Gordon Bulloch (Scotland) Chris Docherty (Scotland) Dougie Hall (Scotland) Gavin Scott Props (Scotland) Willie Anderson (Scotland) Gavin Blackburn (Scotland) Alan Brown (Scotland) Danny Herrington (Scotland) Dave Hilton (Scotland) Gordon McIlwham (Scotland) Euan Murray (Scotland) Alan Watt Locks (Scotland) Darren Burns (Scotland) Stewart Campbell (Scotland) Steve Griffiths (Scotland) Jason White	Loose forwards (Scotland) Gareth Flockhart (Scotland) Donnie Macfadyen (Scotland) Jon Petrie (Scotland) Roland Reid (Scotland) John Shaw (Scotland) Gordon Simpson (Scotland) Martin Waite Half backs (Scotland) Graeme Beveridge (Scotland) Andy Nicol (Scotland) Fraser Stott Stand offs (Scotland) Craig Chalmers (Cook Islands) Tommy Hayes (Scotland) Barry Irving	Centres (Scotland) Alan Bulloch (Scotland) Ian Jardine (Scotland) Ian McInroy (Scotland) Jonathan Stuart Back Three (New Zealand) Michael Bartlett (Australia) Ashley Bond (Scotland) Rory Coupar (Scotland) James Craig (Scotland) Rory Kerr (Scotland) Shaun Longstaff (Scotland) Torquil Mathewson (Scotland) Glenn Metcalfe (Scotland) Rowen Shepherd (Scotland) Derek Stark

=== Academy players ===
The Glasgow Thistles squad was once again sent to New Zealand in the summer of 2000.

Included in the Thistles squad are:

- Colin Shaw (Ayr)
- Graham Thomson (West of Scotland)
- Fraser Sinclair (West of Scotland)
- Graham Calder (Dalziel RFC)

== Player statistics ==
During the 1999–2000 season, Glasgow have used 36 different players in competitive games. The table below shows the number of appearances and points scored by each player.

The statistics for the first match of the Scottish Inter-District Championship are included in the Welsh-Scottish League statistics.

Pos.	Nation	Name	Scottish Inter-District Championship			Welsh-Scottish League			Heineken Cup			Total	
Pos.	Nation	Name	Apps (sub)	Tries	Points kicked	Apps (sub)	Tries	Points kicked	Apps (sub)	Tries	Points kicked	Apps (sub)	Total pts
HK	(Scotland)	Gordon Bulloch	1	0	0	7(3)	3	2	6	1	0	14(3)	22
HK	(Scotland)	Dougie Hall	(1)	0	0	(3)	0	0	0	0	0	(4)	0
HK	(Scotland)	Gavin Scott	1(1)	0	0	15	1	0	(2)	0	0	16(3)	5
PR	(Scotland)	Willie Anderson	0	0	0	4(3)	0	0	0	0	0	4(3)	0
PR	(Scotland)	Alan Brown	0	0	0	(1)	0	0	0	0	0	(1)	0
PR	(Scotland)	Dave Hilton	2	0	0	9(3)	0	0	6	0	0	17(3)	0
PR	(Scotland)	Danny Herrington	0	0	0	1(1)	0	0	0	0	0	1(1)	0
PR	(Scotland)	Gordon McIlwham	2	0	0	20	0	0	6	0	0	28	0
PR	(Scotland)	Alan Watt	(1)	0	0	10(6)	1	0	(1)	0	0	10(8)	5
LK	(Scotland)	Darren Burns	1	0	0	10(3)	0	0	0	0	0	11(3)	0
LK	(Scotland)	Stewart Campbell	2	0	0	19	1	0	6	0	0	27	5
LK	(Scotland)	Steve Griffiths	0	0	0	8(1)	0	0	0	0	0	8(1)	0
LK	(Scotland)	Jason White	2	0	0	18(2)	2	0	6	1	0	26(2)	15
BR	(Scotland)	Gareth Flockhart	0	0	0	10(3)	2	0	0	0	0	10(3)	10
BR	(Scotland)	Donnie Macfadyen	1	0	0	15(2)	3	0	5	0	0	21(2)	15
BR	(Scotland)	Jon Petrie	(1)	0	0	14(2)	3	0	1(4)	0	0	15(7)	15
BR	(Scotland)	Roland Reid	1	0	0	3(4)	2	0	5(1)	1	0	9(5)	15
BR	(Scotland)	Gordon Simpson	2	2	0	7(1)	5	0	6	2	0	15(1)	45
BR	(Scotland)	Martin Waite	1(1)	1	0	6(5)	3	0	1	0	0	8(6)	20
SH	(Scotland)	Graeme Beveridge	(1)	0	0	4(3)	1	0	(1)	0	0	4(5)	5
SH	(Scotland)	Andy Nicol	1	0	0	15(1)	2	0	6	1	0	22(1)	15
SH	(Scotland)	Fraser Stott	1	0	0	2(3)	1	0	(1)	0	0	3(4)	5
FH	(Scotland)	Craig Chalmers	0	0	0	3	0	11	(1)	0	0	3(1)	11
FH	(Cook Islands)	Tommy Hayes	2	0	34	19(2)	7	160	6	1	60	27(2)	294
FH	(Scotland)	Barry Irving	1	0	0	10(2)	0	18	0	0	0	11(2)	18
CE	(Scotland)	Alan Bulloch	2	0	0	19(2)	4	0	6	0	0	27(2)	20
CE	(Scotland)	Ian Jardine	1	0	0	16(2)	2	0	1(1)	0	0	18(3)	10
CE	(Scotland)	Ian McInroy	0	0	0	8(4)	1	0	3(1)	0	0	11(5)	5
CE	(Scotland)	Jonathan Stuart	2	0	0	17(1)	1	0	6	0	0	25(1)	5
WG	(New Zealand)	Michael Bartlett	0	0	0	1	0	0	0	0	0	1	0
WG	(Australia)	Ashley Bond	0	0	0	(2)	0	0	0	0	0	(2)	0
WG	(Scotland)	James Craig	1	1	0	16	2	0	2	1	0	19	20
WG	(Scotland)	Rory Kerr	0	0	0	5	0	0	0	0	0	5	0
WG	(Scotland)	Shaun Longstaff	1	0	0	6	5	0	6	3	0	13	40
FB	(Scotland)	Glenn Metcalfe	1	0	0	8(1)	3	0	6	3	0	15(1)	30
FB	(Scotland)	Rowen Shepherd	1	0	0	3(2)	2	5	0	0	0	4(2)	15

== Staff movements ==
=== Coaches ===
==== Personnel in ====
None.

==== Personnel out ====
None.

== Player movements ==
=== Player transfers ===
==== In ====
Jonathan Stuart from (England) Leicester Tigers
Alan Brown from Dundee HSFP
Danny Herrington from Kirkcaldy RFC
Torquil Mathewson from Glasgow Hawks
Gavin Blackburn from (England) London Scottish
(Australia) Ashley Bond from (France) Sportive Ortheziene
Roland Reid from (South Africa) Golden Lions
Craig Chalmers from Edinburgh Reivers
Dave Hilton from (England) Bath Rugby
Alan Watt from Currie RFC
Andy Nicol from (England) Bath Rugby
(New Zealand) Michael Bartlett from (New Zealand) Canterbury
Rory Kerr from West of Scotland
Ian McInroy from West of Scotland
Dougie Hall from Hillhead Jordanhill
Darren Burns from Edinburgh Reivers
Barry Irving from London Scottish
Steve Griffiths from (England) Leeds Tykes
Donnie Macfadyen from Boroughmuir

==== Out ====
(Scotland) Derrick Patterson to (France) Stade Français
(Scotland) Tom Smith to (France) CA Brive
(Scotland) Stuart Grimes to (England) Newcastle Falcons
(Scotland) Kevin McKenzie retirement
(Scotland) Rob Wainwright retirement
(Scotland) John Manson retirement
(Scotland) Alan Kittle to (Scotland) Musselburgh
(Scotland) Guy Perrett sabbatical to focus on medical studies
(Scotland) Gordon Mackay to (France) Lyon OU
(Scotland) Murray Wallace to (Canada) Boulder Colorado
(Scotland) Chris Paterson to (Scotland) Edinburgh Reivers
(Scotland) Cameron Little to (Scotland) Glasgow Hawks
(South Africa) Luke Smith to (France) Racing 92
(Scotland) John Leslie to (Japan) Munakata Sanix Blues
(New Zealand) Aaron Collins to (Scotland) Gala
(Scotland) Matt McGrandles to (Scotland) Stirling County
(Scotland) Chris Simmers to (Scotland) Glasgow Hawks

== Competitions ==
=== Pre-season and friendlies ===
==== Match 1 ====
31 July 1999

Glasgow Caledonians (Scotland)	19 – 31	(Ireland) Ulster
Try: Martin Waite; Ian Jardine; Torquil Mathewson; Con: Tommy Hayes x 2	Report	Try: Ward; Coulter; Fredericks; Johns; Topping; Con: Mason x 3.

London Road, Stranraer, Wigtownshire RFC

Glasgow Caledonians: A Bulloch; J Craig, J Stuart, I Jardine, S Longstaff; T Hayes, A Nicol; D Hilton, G Scott, W Anderson, S Campbell, S Griffiths, G Flockhart, M Waite, G Simpson. Replacements - I McInroy, R Kerr, B Irving, G Beveridge, F Stott, Gavin Blackburn, G McIlwham, C Docherty, A Watt, D Burns, J Shaw, Torquil Mathewson, D McFadyen

Ulster: J Bell, S Bell, G Leslie, M Blair, S Bromley, A Clarke, S Coulter, J Cunningham, M Edwards, J Fitzpatrick, R Fredericks, D Topping, D Humphreys, P Johns, G Longwell, N Malone, S Mason, T McWhirter, E Miller, D O'Cuinneagain, J Topping, A Ward, R Irwin, R Weir

==== Match 2 ====
8 August 1999

Ontario Rugby Union (Canada)	21 – 65	(Scotland) Glasgow Caledonians
Try: Sean Keenan; Martin Carter; Con: Simon Rodgers; Pen: Simon Rodgers x 3	Report	Try: Donnie Macfadyen; Ian Jardine; Shaun Longstaff x4 Gareth Flockhart x2 Alan Bulloch x 2 Jonathan Stuart; Con: Tommy Hayes x 5

Fletcher's Fields, Markham, Ontario

Ontario: S Rodgers; J Collins, B Luke, D Daypuck, S Keenan; C Robinson, R Stickel; B Stoikos, L Gardiner, M Jacques, I Dann, M Carter, J Tomlinson, P Ross, D Swindells

Glasgow Caledonians: A Bulloch; T Mathewson, J Stuart, I Jardine, S Longstaff; T Hayes, A Nicol; G McIlwham, G Scott, W Anderson, S Griffiths, D Burns, G Flockhart, G Simpson, D McFadyen

==== Match 3 ====
12 August 1999

Uruguay A	8 – 68	(Scotland) Glasgow Caledonians
Try: Machada; Pen: Caffera	Report	Try: Rory Kerr x 4 Shaun Longstaff x 2 Alan Bulloch; Barry Irving; Gordon Simpson; Con: Barry Irving x 6 Pen: Barry Irving

Fletcher's Fields, Markham, Ontario

Uruguay A: A Ibarria, G Souza, C Arocena, De Freitas, A Vazquaz, S Arocena, E Caffera, M Brussoni, L Machado, F Victor, G Manini, F Auesperg, S Mosquera, G Laffitte, N Achard.

Glasgow Caledonians: A Bulloch, S Longstaff, I McInroy, J Stuart, R Kerr, B Irving, G Beveridge, G McIlwham, C Docherty, A Watt, S Campbell, J Petrie, J White, G Simpson, M Waite. Substitutions: W Anderson for Watt (40), G Blackburn for McIlwham (47), F Stott for Beveridge (64), T Mathewson for Longstaff (70).

==== Match 4 ====
14 August 1999

Glasgow Caledonians (Scotland)	30 – 10	(Scotland) Edinburgh Reivers
Try: Donnie Macfadyen; Jason White; Rory Kerr; Ian Jardine; Con: Tommy Hayes x 2 Pen: Tommy Hayes x 2	Preview; Report	Try: Nathan Hines; Con: Scott Welsh; Pen: Scott Welsh

Fletcher's Fields, Markham, Ontario
Referee: D Steele (CRU)

Glasgow Caledonians:B Irving; T Mathewson, A Bulloch, I Jardine, R Kerr; T Hayes, F Stott; G McIlwham, G Scott, W Anderson, S Griffiths, D Burns, J White, G Flockhart, D McFadyen. Replacements: J Stuart, Graeme Beveridge, S Campbell, M Waite, G Blackburn, A Watt, C Docherty. Used: G Beveridge for Stott, 70; AWatt for Anderson, 80.

Edinburgh Reivers:S Lang; K Milligan, M Di Rollo, K Utterson, C Sharman; S Welsh, G Burns; R McNulty, G McKelvey, B Stewart, N Hines, I Fullarton, S Scott, G Hayter, G Dall. Subs: A Common for Lang, 39; M Proudfoot for Stewart, 55; A Jacobsen for McNulty, 67; M Lee for Utterson, 70.

By winning all 3 three matches in Ontario, Glasgow won the Canadian Tri-Continental Tournament.

=== Scottish Inter-District Championship ===
Still with only Glasgow and Edinburgh remaining as professional teams in Scotland, the Tri-Series was run again. This time however the tournament had no sponsor as Tennents had pulled out of the competition.

The first tie of the Tri-Series was held jointly with the Welsh-Scottish League. The match is shown below for convenience, however since it is also a Welsh-Scottish League match and is included in those statistics, only 2 matches for the Scottish Inter-District Championship are recorded for statistical purposes.

==== 1999-2000 League Table ====
Only for completeness. The Tri-Series was run as a best of three.

Team	P	W	D	L	PF	PA	+/-	Pts
Glasgow Caledonians	3	2	0	1	104	56	+48	4
Edinburgh Reivers	3	1	0	2	56	104	-48	2

==== Results ====
===== Round 1 / round 13 Welsh-Scottish League =====
21 January 2000

Glasgow Caledonians (Scotland)	47 – 10	(Scotland) Edinburgh Reivers
Try: Andy Nicol; Shaun Longstaff; Tommy Hayes; Martin Waite; Glenn Metcalfe; Gordon Bulloch; Con: Tommy Hayes x 4 Pen: Tommy Hayes x 3	Preview; Preview; Report	Try: Lucking; Con: Hodge; Pen: Hodge

Hughenden Stadium
Referee: J Fleming (Boroughmuir)

===== Round 2 =====
25 February 2000

Edinburgh Reivers	24 – 32	Glasgow Caledonians
Try: Derrick Lee; Carl Hogg; Con: Duncan Hodge; Pen: Duncan Hodge x 4	Preview; Report; Report	Try: James Craig; Pen: Tommy Hayes x 9

Riverside Park, Jedburgh
Referee: R Dickson (Madras FP)

===== Round 3 =====
25 March 2000

Glasgow Caledonians	22 – 25	Edinburgh Reivers
Try: Martin Waite; Gordon Simpson x 2 Con: Tommy Hayes x 2 Pen: Tommy Hayes	Preview; Report; Report	Try: Fullarton; Utterson; Pen: Ross x 4 Drop: Ross

Caledonian Stadium, Inverness
Referee: J Hogg (Hawick).

=== European Champions Cup ===
==== Pool 1 ====
Team	P	W	D	L	Tries for	Tries against	Try diff	Points for	Points against	Points diff	Pts
(France) Stade Français	6	4	0	2	22	9	13	192	109	83	8
(Ireland) Leinster	6	4	0	2	12	17	−5	150	138	12	8
(Scotland) Glasgow Caledonians	6	2	0	4	14	23	−9	130	179	−49	4
(England) Leicester Tigers	6	2	0	4	12	11	1	127	173	−46	4

==== Results ====
===== Round 1 =====
21 November 1999
15:00

Stade Français (France)	37 – 18	(Scotland) Glasgow Caledonians
Try: Raffault; Gomes; Comba; Lombard; Landreau; Con: Dominguez x 3 Pen: Dominguez x 2	Preview; Report; Report	Try: Glenn Metcalfe; Gordon Simpson; Con: Tommy Hayes; Pen: Tommy Hayes x 2

Stade Jean-Bouin
Attendance: 5,000
Referee: A Lewis (Ireland)

===== Round 2 =====
26 November 1999
19:30

Glasgow Caledonians (Scotland)	29 – 17	(Ireland) Leinster
Try: Shaun Longstaff x 2 Roland Reid; Tommy Hayes; Con: Tommy Hayes x 3 Pen: Tommy Hayes	Preview; Report; Report	Try: S Byrne penalty try Con: McHugh x 2 Pen: McHugh

Hughenden Stadium
Attendance: 1,800
Referee: P Thomas (France)

===== Round 3 =====
12 December 1999
15:15

Glasgow Caledonians (Scotland)	30 – 17	(England) Leicester Tigers
Try: Andy Nicol; Shaun Longstaff; Con: Tommy Hayes; Pen: Tommy Hayes x 6	Preview; Report; Report; Report	Try: Healey; Moody; Back; Con: Goode

McDiarmid Park
Attendance: 4,120
Referee: J. Jutge (France)

===== Round 4 =====
18 December 1999
15:00

Leicester Tigers (England)	34 – 21	(Scotland) Glasgow Caledonians
Try: Healey; Lougheed; Back; Con: Stimpson x 2 Pen: Stimpson x 5	Preview; Report; Report; Report	Try: Gordon Bulloch; James Craig; Con: Tommy Hayes; Pen: Tommy Hayes x 3

Welford Road
Attendance: 9,801
Referee: R Davies (Wales)

===== Round 5 =====
7 January 2000
18:30

Leinster (Ireland)	44 – 17	(Scotland) Glasgow Caledonians
Try: Peter McKenna; Denis Hickie; Brian O'Driscoll; John McWeeney; Emmet Farrell; Gary Halpin; Con: Emmet Farrell x 4 Pen: Emmet Farrell x 2	Preview; Report; Report; Report	Try: Glenn Metcalfe; Gordon Simpson; Con: Tommy Hayes x 2 Pen: Tommy Hayes

Donnybrook
Attendance: 5,000
Referee: D Mene (France)

===== Round 6 =====
14 January 2000
19:30

Glasgow Caledonians (Scotland)	15 – 30	(France) Stade Français
Try: Glenn Metcalfe; Jason White; Con: Tommy Hayes; Pen: Tommy Hayes	Preview; Report; Report; Report; Report	Try: Dominici x 2 De Villiers; Landreau; Con: Dominguez x 2 Pen: Dominguez x 2

Hughenden Stadium
Attendance: 4,120
Referee: Brian Campsall (England)

=== Welsh-Scottish League ===
==== 1999-2000 League Table ====
Team	P	W	D	L	PF	PA	+/-	Pts
(Wales) Cardiff RFC	22	18	1	3	879	504	+375	59
(Wales) Newport RFC	22	15	1	6	773	453	+320	49
(Wales) Pontypridd RFC	22	14	2	6	666	478	+188	47
(Wales) Swansea RFC	22	14	1	7	691	509	+182	45
(Wales) Llanelli RFC	22	13	0	9	748	527	+221	38
(Wales) Ebbw Vale RFC	22	12	0	10	647	569	+78	38
(Wales) Neath RFC	22	11	2	9	664	553	+111	35
(Scotland) Edinburgh Reivers	22	10	1	11	564	654	-90	34
(Wales) Bridgend RFC	22	8	1	13	427	564	-137	27
(Scotland) Glasgow Caledonians	22	8	1	13	488	621	-133	25
(Wales) Caerphilly RFC	22	2	1	19	427	939	-512	6
(Wales) Dunvant RFC	22	1	1	20	357	960	-603	5

==== Results ====
===== Round 1 =====
3 September 1999

Glasgow Caledonians (Scotland)	22 – 30	(Wales) Pontypridd RFC
Try: Gavin Scott; Tommy Hayes; Con: Tommy Hayes x 2 Pen: Tommy Hayes	Preview; Report; Report	Try: Brett Davey; Gareth Wyatt; Con: Lee Jarvis; Pen: Lee Jarvis x 6

Bridgehaugh Park, Stirling
Attendance: 1850
Referee: D Gillet (France)

===== Round 2 =====
11 September 1999

Edinburgh Reivers (Scotland)	8 – 15	(Scotland) Glasgow Caledonians
Try: Hayter; Pen: Lang	Preview; Report	Try: James Craig; Tommy Hayes; Con: Tommy Hayes; Pen: Tommy Hayes

Netherdale, Galashiels
Referee: D Tyndall (Ireland)

===== Round 3 =====
18 September 1999

Glasgow Caledonians (Scotland)	20 – 28	(Wales) Ebbw Vale RFC
Try: Gareth Flockhart; Pen: Craig Chalmers; Tommy Hayes x 4	Preview; Report	Try: Penalty Try; J Williams; J Hawker; Con: J Strange x 2 Pen: J Strange x 3

Millbrae, Alloway
Referee: R Dickson (Madras FP)

===== Round 4 =====
25 September 1999

Swansea RFC (Wales)	28 – 13	(Scotland) Glasgow Caledonians
Try: Richard Jones; Chris Wells x2 Richard Rees; Con: Arwel Thomas; Pen: Arwel Thomas x 2	Preview; Report; Report; Report	Try: Ian Jardine; Con: Tommy Hayes; Pen: Tommy Hayes x 2

Referee: D. Davies (Wales)

===== Round 5 =====
2 October 1999

Glasgow Caledonians (Scotland)	10 – 17	(Wales) Bridgend RFC
Try: Alan Bulloch; Con: Tommy Hayes; Pen: Tommy Hayes	Preview; Report	Try: Stephens; Wake; Con: Lewis; Pen: Lewis

Rubislaw Playing Fields, Aberdeen
Referee: J Yuille (Biggar)

===== Round 6 =====
8 October 1999

Glasgow Caledonians (Scotland)	14 – 10	(Wales) Llanelli RFC
Try: Andy Nicol; Con: Tommy Hayes; Pen: Tommy Hayes	Preview; Report	Try: Emms; Con: Warlow; Pen: Hayward

Hughenden Stadium
Referee: S Piercy (England)

===== Round 7 =====
17 October 1999

Glasgow Caledonians (Scotland)	26 – 11	(Wales) Caerphilly RFC
Try: Jason White; Fraser Stott; Donnie Macfadyen; Con: Tommy Hayes; Pen: Tommy Hayes x 3	Preview; Report	Try: Chris Brown; Pen: Chris John x 2

Bridgehaugh Park, Stirling
Referee: J Yuille (Biggar)

===== Round 8 =====
22 October 1999

Glasgow Caledonians (Scotland)	25 – 36	(Wales) Cardiff RFC
Try: Jonathan Stuart; Graeme Beveridge; Pen: Tommy Hayes x 5	Preview; Report	Try: S. Williams x 2 Robinson; Con: Burke x 3 Pen: Burke x 5

Hughenden Stadium
Referee: Bertie Smith (Ireland)

===== Round 9 =====
30 October 1999

Dunvant RFC (Wales)	24 – 28	(Scotland) Glasgow Caledonians
Try: Warren Lloyd; Adrian Killa; Con: Simon Daniel; Pen: Simon Daniel x 2 Drop: Simon Daniel x 2	Preview; Report	Try: Shaun Longstaff x 2 Ian McInroy; Donnie Macfadyen; Con: Tommy Hayes; Pen: Tommy Hayes; Barry Irving

Broadacre
Referee: H Watkins (Maesteg)

===== Round 10 =====
5 November 1999

Glasgow Caledonians (Scotland)	8 – 8	(Wales) Newport RFC
Try: Gordon Simpson; Pen: Tommy Hayes	Preview; Report	Try: Ben Breeze; Pen: Gareth Cull

Bridgehaugh Park, Stirling
Referee: I Ramage (Berwick)

===== Round 11 =====
12 November 1999

Glasgow Caledonians (Scotland)	32 – 18	(Wales) Neath RFC
Try: Ian Jardine; Gordon Simpson; Shaun Longstaff; Alan Bulloch x 2 Con: Tommy Hayes x 2 Pen: Tommy Hayes	Preview; Report	Try: Andrew Jacobs; Tristan Davies; Con: Pearce; Pen: Rees; Drop: Rees

Hughenden Stadium
Referee: J Fleming (Boroughmuir)

===== Round 12 =====
4 December 1999

Pontypridd RFC (Wales)	44 – 10	(Scotland) Glasgow Caledonians
Try: Geraint Lewis (no.8); Lamerton; Wyatt; Geraint O Lewis (wing) x 2 Con: Jarvis x 5 Pen: Jarvis x 2	Preview	Try: Gordon Simpson; Con: Tommy Hayes; Pen: Tommy Hayes

Referee: D Davies (Llanbradach)

===== Round 13 / Round 1 Scottish Inter-District Championship =====
27 December 1999
postponed to
21 January 2000

Glasgow Caledonians (Scotland)	47 – 10	(Scotland) Edinburgh Reivers
Try: Andy Nicol; Shaun Longstaff; Tommy Hayes; Martin Waite; Glenn Metcalfe; Gordon Bulloch; Con: Tommy Hayes x 4 Pen: Tommy Hayes x 3	Preview; Preview; Report	Try: Lucking; Con: Hodge; Pen: Hodge

Hughenden Stadium
Referee: J Fleming (Boroughmuir)

===== Round 14 =====
3 January 2000

Ebbw Vale RFC (Wales)	26 – 18	(Scotland) Glasgow Caledonians
Try: Hawker; Jones; Con: Strange x 2 Pen: Strange x 4	Preview; Report	Try: James Craig; Jason White; Con: Craig Chalmers; Pen: Craig Chalmers x 2

Eugene Cross Park
Referee: N Williams (Bryncoch)

===== Round 15 =====
25 January 2000
postponed to
14 April 2000

Glasgow Caledonians (Scotland)	25 – 28	(Wales) Swansea RFC
Try: Jon Petrie x 2 Tommy Hayes; Con: Tommy Hayes; Rowen Shepherd; Pen: Tommy Hayes x 2	Preview; Report	Try: Jenkins; Rees x 2 Con: A Thomas x 2 Pen: A Thomas x 2 Drop: A Thomas

Hughenden Stadium
Referee: J Fleming (Boroughmuir)

===== Round 16 =====
12 February 2000

Bridgend RFC (Wales)	28 – 25	(Scotland) Glasgow Caledonians
Try: Ripol; Mafi; Stephens; Durston; Con: Williams; Pen: Williams x 2	Preview; Report	Try: Gordon Bulloch; Donnie Macfadyen; Con: Tommy Hayes x 2 Pen: Tommy Hayes x 2

Referee: D Bevan (Clydach)

===== Round 17 =====
11 March 2000

Llanelli RFC (Wales)	57 – 21	(Scotland) Glasgow Caledonians
Try: Cardey x 2 D James; S Easterby; S Jones; Moon; Koloi; N Boobyer; I Boobyer; Con: S Jones x 6	Preview; Report	Try: Martin Waite x 2 Shaun Longstaff; Con: Tommy Hayes x 3

Stradey Park
Referee: R Elliott (Cardiff)

===== Round 18 =====
8 April 2000

Caerphilly RFC (Wales)	30 – 34	(Scotland) Glasgow Caledonians
Try: Wilson; John; Watkins; Robinson x 2 Con: John; Pen: Richards	Preview; Preview; Report	Try: Stewart Campbell; Gordon Simpson x 2 Rowen Shepherd x 2 Con: Tommy Hayes x 3 Pen: Tommy Hayes

Victoria Park

===== Round 19 =====
21 April 2000

Cardiff RFC (Wales)	42 – 21	(Scotland) Glasgow Caledonians
Try: Morgan x 2 Thomas; Howley; Botham; Con: Burke x 4 Pen: Burke x 3	Preview; Report	Try: Glenn Metcalfe x 2 Con: Tommy Hayes; Pen: Tommy Hayes x 3

Cardiff Arms Park
Referee: David R Davies (WRU)

===== Round 20 =====
30 April 2000

Glasgow Caledonians (Scotland)	35 – 27	(Wales) Dunvant RFC
Try: Gareth Flockhart; Alan Bulloch; Tommy Hayes; Gordon Bulloch; Con: Barry Irving x 3 Pen: Barry Irving x 2 Rowen Shepherd	Preview; Report; Report	Try: Lloyd; Baker x 2 Con: M Thomas x 3 Pen: M Thomas x 2

Bridgehaugh Park, Stirling
Referee: I Ramage (Berwick)

===== Round 21 =====
6 May 2000

Newport RFC (Wales)	64 – 29	(Scotland) Glasgow Caledonians
Try: Marinos; Snow; Burn x 4 Taylor; Smith; C Jones x 2 Con: Howarth x 7	Preview; Preview; Report; Report	Try: Alan Watt; Jon Petrie; Martin Waite; Tommy Hayes; Roland Reid; Con: Tommy Hayes; Gordon Bulloch

Rodney Parade
Referee: H Lewis (Cardiff)

===== Round 22 =====
12 May 2000

Neath RFC (Wales)	47 – 10	(Scotland) Glasgow Caledonians
Try: Storey x 2 Tieuti x 2 M Davies; Sidoli; Con: Rees x 4 Pen: Rees x 3	Preview; Report	Try: Roland Reid; Con: Tommy Hayes; Pen: Tommy Hayes

The Gnoll
Referee: T Rowlands (Treorchy)

== Competitive debuts this season ==
A player's nationality shown is taken from the nationality at the highest honour for the national side obtained; or if never capped internationally their place of birth. Senior caps take precedence over junior caps or place of birth; junior caps take precedence over place of birth. A player's nationality at debut may be different from the nationality shown. Combination sides like the British and Irish Lions or Pacific Islanders are not national sides, or nationalities.

Players in BOLD font have been capped by their senior international XV side as nationality shown.

Players in Italic font have capped either by their international 7s side; or by the international XV 'A' side as nationality shown.

Players in normal font have not been capped at senior level.

A position in parentheses indicates that the player debuted as a substitute. A player may have made a prior debut for Glasgow Warriors in a non-competitive match, 'A' match or 7s match; these matches are not listed.

Tournaments where competitive debut made:

**Scottish Inter-District Championship**	**Welsh–Scottish League**	**WRU Challenge Cup**	**Celtic League**	**Celtic Cup**	**1872 Cup**	**Pro12**	**Pro14**	**Rainbow Cup**	**United Rugby Championship**	**European Challenge Cup**	**Heineken Cup / European Champions Cup**

Crosshatching indicates a jointly hosted match.

Number	Player nationality	Name	Position	Date of debut	Venue	Stadium	Opposition nationality	Opposition side	Tournament	Match result	Scoring debut
62	(Scotland)	Steve Griffiths	Lock	1999-09-03	Home	Bridgehaugh Park	(Wales)	Pontypridd	Welsh–Scottish League	Loss	Nil
63	(Scotland)	Darren Burns	Lock	1999-09-03	Home	Bridgehaugh Park	(Wales)	Pontypridd	Welsh–Scottish League	Loss	Nil
64	(Scotland)	**Donnie Macfadyen**	Flanker	1999-09-03	Home	Bridgehaugh Park	(Wales)	Pontypridd	Welsh–Scottish League	Loss	Nil
65	(Scotland)	**Andy Nicol**	Scrum half	1999-09-03	Home	Bridgehaugh Park	(Wales)	Pontypridd	Welsh–Scottish League	Loss	Nil
66	(Scotland)	**Rory Kerr**	Wing	1999-09-03	Home	Bridgehaugh Park	(Wales)	Pontypridd	Welsh–Scottish League	Loss	Nil
67	(Scotland)	Jonathan Stuart	Centre	1999-09-03	Home	Bridgehaugh Park	(Wales)	Pontypridd	Welsh–Scottish League	Loss	Nil
68	(Scotland)	Barry Irving	Fly half	1999-09-03	Home	Bridgehaugh Park	(Wales)	Pontypridd	Welsh–Scottish League	Loss	Nil
69	(Scotland)	**Alan Watt**	Prop	1999-09-03	Home	Bridgehaugh Park	(Wales)	Pontypridd	Welsh–Scottish League	Loss	Nil
70	(Scotland)	**Dougie Hall**	Hooker	1999-09-11	Away	Netherdale	(Scotland)	Edinburgh	Welsh–Scottish League	Win	Nil
71	(Scotland)	Ian McInroy	Centre	1999-09-11	Away	Netherdale	(Scotland)	Edinburgh	Welsh–Scottish League	Win	Nil
72	(Scotland)	**Craig Chalmers**	Fly half	1999-09-18	Home	Millbrae	(Wales)	Ebbw Vale	Welsh–Scottish League	Loss	3 pts
73	(Scotland)	**Dave Hilton**	Prop	1999-09-18	Home	Millbrae	(Wales)	Ebbw Vale	Welsh–Scottish League	Loss	Nil
74	(Scotland)	Alan Brown	Prop	1999-09-25	Away	St. Helen's	(Wales)	Swansea	Welsh–Scottish League	Loss	Nil
75	(Australia)	Ashley Bond	Centre	1999-10-30	Away	Broadacre	(Wales)	Dunvant	Welsh–Scottish League	Win	Nil
76	(Scotland)	**Roland Reid**	Centre	1999-11-12	Home	Hughenden Stadium	(Wales)	Neath	Welsh–Scottish League	Win	Nil
77	(Scotland)	Danny Herrington	Prop	2000-02-12	Away	Brewery Field	(Wales)	Bridgend	Welsh–Scottish League	Loss	Nil
78	(New Zealand)	Michael Bartlett	Wing	2000-05-12	Away	The Gnoll	(Wales)	Neath	Welsh–Scottish League	Loss	Nil

== Sponsorship ==
- Scotland on Line

=== Official kit supplier ===
Canterbury
