= 1999–2000 Welsh-Scottish League =

- Countries: Scotland Wales
- Champions: (Wales) Cardiff RFC
- Runners-up: (Wales) Newport RFC
- Matches played: 132

Cardiff won the inaugural Welsh-Scottish League. However they lost their final match against Swansea at home thus losing an unbeaten home record that dated back to December 1997. The points system was complicated by the Rugby World Cup and only two points were awarded for a win prior to November 1999. Both Cardiff and Pontypridd were deducted points by playing Edinburgh during this World Cup period; although the matches were scheduled to take place outwith the World Cup.

== 1999-2000 League Table ==
The top 5 Welsh teams plus Edinburgh and Glasgow qualified for next season's Heineken Cup.

Team	P	W	D	L	PF	PA	+/-	Pts
(Wales) Cardiff RFC	22	18	1	3	879	504	+375	59
(Wales) Newport RFC	22	15	1	6	773	453	+320	49
(Wales) Pontypridd RFC	22	14	2	6	666	478	+188	47
(Wales) Swansea RFC	22	14	1	7	691	509	+182	45
(Wales) Llanelli RFC	22	13	0	9	748	527	+221	38
(Wales) Ebbw Vale RFC	22	12	0	10	647	569	+78	38
(Wales) Neath RFC	22	11	2	9	664	553	+111	35
(Scotland) Edinburgh Reivers	22	10	1	11	564	654	-90	34
(Wales) Bridgend RFC	22	8	1	13	427	564	-137	27
(Scotland) Glasgow Caledonians	22	8	1	13	488	621	-133	25
(Wales) Caerphilly RFC	22	2	1	19	427	939	-512	6
(Wales) Dunvant RFC	22	1	1	20	357	960	-603	5

== Results ==
=== Round 1 ===
3 September 1999

Glasgow Caledonians (Scotland)	22 – 30	(Wales) Pontypridd RFC
Try: Gavin Scott; Tommy Hayes; Con: Tommy Hayes x 2 Pen: Tommy Hayes	Preview; Report	Try: Davey; Wyatt; Con: Jarvis; Pen: Jarvis x 6

Bridgehaugh Park, Stirling
Referee: D Gillet (France)

4 September 1999

Bridgend RFC (Wales)	21 – 18	(Wales) Swansea RFC

4 September 1999

Caerphilly RFC (Wales)	22 – 51	(Scotland) Edinburgh Reivers

4 September 1999

Dunvant RFC (Wales)	20 – 35	(Wales) Neath RFC

4 September 1999

Llanelli RFC (Wales)	39 – 28	(Wales) Ebbw Vale RFC

4 September 1999

Newport RFC (Wales)	18 – 13	(Wales) Cardiff RFC

=== Round 2 ===
11 September 1999

Bridgend RFC (Wales)	24 – 24	(Wales) Cardiff RFC

11 September 1999

Ebbw Vale RFC (Wales)	54 – 24	(Wales) Caerphilly RFC

11 September 1999

Edinburgh Reivers (Scotland)	8 – 15	(Scotland) Glasgow Caledonians
Try: Hayter; Pen: Lang	Preview; Report	Try: James Craig; Tommy Hayes; Con: Tommy Hayes; Pen: Barry Irving

Netherdale, Galashiels
Referee: D Tyndall (Ireland)

11 September 1999

Neath RFC (Wales)	26 – 20	(Wales) Newport RFC

11 September 1999

Pontypridd RFC (Wales)	51 – 8	(Wales) Dunvant RFC

11 September 1999

Swansea RFC (Wales)	39 – 27	(Wales) Llanelli RFC

=== Round 3 ===
18 September 1999

Caerphilly RFC (Wales)	18 – 34	(Wales) Swansea RFC

18 September 1999

Dunvant RFC (Wales)	22 – 29	(Scotland) Edinburgh Reivers

18 September 1999

Glasgow Caledonians (Scotland)	20 – 28	(Wales) Ebbw Vale RFC
Try: Gareth Flockhart; Pen: Craig Chalmers; Tommy Hayes x 4	Preview; Report	Try: Penalty Try; J Williams; J Hawker; Con: J Strange x 2 Pen: J Strange x 3

Millbrae, Alloway
Referee: R Dickson (Madras FP)

18 September 1999

Llanelli RFC (Wales)	36 – 15	(Wales) Bridgend RFC

18 September 1999

Neath RFC (Wales)	20 – 21	(Wales) Cardiff RFC

18 September 1999

Newport RFC (Wales)	28 – 33	(Wales) Pontypridd RFC

=== Round 4 ===
24 September 1999

Edinburgh Reivers (Scotland)	23 – 51	(Wales) Newport RFC
	Report

25 September 1999

Bridgend RFC (Wales)	33 – 34	(Wales) Caerphilly RFC
	Report

25 September 1999

Ebbw Vale RFC (Wales)	65 – 25	(Wales) Dunvant RFC
	Report

25 September 1999

Llanelli RFC (Wales)	60 – 18	(Wales) Cardiff RFC
	Report

25 September 1999

Pontypridd RFC (Wales)	20 – 20	(Wales) Neath RFC
	Report

25 September 1999

Swansea RFC (Wales)	28 – 13	(Scotland) Glasgow Caledonians
Try: Richard Jones; Chris Wells x2 Richard Rees; Con: Arwel Thomas; Pen: Arwel Thomas x 2	Preview; Report; Report; Report	Try: Ian Jardine; Con: Tommy Hayes; Pen: Tommy Hayes x 2

Referee: D. Davies (Wales)

=== Round 5 ===
2 October 1999

Caerphilly RFC (Wales)	7 – 43	(Wales) Llanelli RFC

2 October 1999

Dunvant RFC (Wales)	19 – 19	(Wales) Swansea RFC

2 October 1999

Glasgow Caledonians (Scotland)	10 – 17	(Wales) Bridgend RFC
Try: Alan Bulloch; Con: Tommy Hayes; Pen: Tommy Hayes	Report	Try: Stephens; Wake; Con: Lewis; Pen: Lewis

Rubislaw Playing Fields, Aberdeen
Referee: J Yuille (Biggar)

2 October 1999

Neath RFC (Wales)	38 – 27	(Scotland) Edinburgh Reivers

2 October 1999

Newport RFC (Wales)	40 – 27	(Wales) Ebbw Vale RFC

=== Round 6 ===
8 October 1999

Ebbw Vale RFC (Wales)	37 – 30	(Wales) Neath RFC

8 October 1999

Glasgow Caledonians (Scotland)	14 – 10	(Wales) Llanelli RFC
Try: Andy Nicol; Con: Tommy Hayes; Pen: Tommy Hayes	Report	Try: Emms; Con: Warlow; Pen: Hayward

Hughenden Stadium
Referee: S Piercy (England)

8 October 1999

Swansea RFC (Wales)	32 – 22	(Wales) Newport RFC

10 October 1999

Bridgend RFC (Wales)	30 – 0	(Wales) Dunvant RFC

10 October 1999

Caerphilly RFC (Wales)	20 – 32	(Wales) Cardiff RFC

10 October 1999

Edinburgh Reivers (Scotland)	20 – 23	(Wales) Pontypridd RFC

=== Round 7 ===
15 October 1999

Edinburgh Reivers (Scotland)	12 – 53	(Wales) Cardiff RFC

15 October 1999

Neath RFC (Wales)	32 – 23	(Wales) Swansea RFC

16 October 1999

Dunvant RFC (Wales)	22 – 60	(Wales) Llanelli RFC

16 October 1999

Newport RFC (Wales)	39 – 7	(Wales) Bridgend RFC

16 October 1999

Pontypridd RFC (Wales)	36 – 20	(Wales) Ebbw Vale RFC

17 October 1999

Glasgow Caledonians (Scotland)	26 – 11	(Wales) Caerphilly RFC
Try: Jason White; Fraser Stott; Donnie Macfadyen; Con: Tommy Hayes; Pen: Tommy Hayes x 3	Report	Try: Brown; Pen: John x 2

Bridgehaugh Park, Stirling
Referee: J Yuille (Biggar)

=== Round 8 ===
21 October 1999

Swansea RFC (Wales)	17 – 21	(Wales) Pontypridd RFC

22 October 1999

Glasgow Caledonians (Scotland)	25 – 36	(Wales) Cardiff RFC
Try: Jonathan Stuart; Graeme Beveridge; Pen: Tommy Hayes x 4	Preview; Report	Try: S. Williams x 2 Robinson; Con: Burke x 3 Pen: Burke x 5

Hughenden Stadium
Referee: Bertie Smith (Ireland)

22 October 1999

Llanelli RFC (Wales)	20 – 26	(Wales) Newport RFC

23 October 1999

Ebbw Vale RFC (Wales)	18 – 7	(Scotland) Edinburgh Reivers

24 October 1999

Bridgend RFC (Wales)	14 – 22	(Wales) Neath RFC

24 October 1999

Caerphilly RFC (Wales)	55 – 5	(Wales) Dunvant RFC

=== Round 9 ===
29 October 1999

Ebbw Vale RFC (Wales)	17 – 22	(Wales) Cardiff RFC

29 October 1999

Edinburgh Reivers (Scotland)	34 – 31	(Wales) Swansea RFC

29 October 1999

Pontypridd RFC (Wales)	18 – 9	(Wales) Bridgend RFC

30 October 1999

Dunvant RFC (Wales)	24 – 28	(Scotland) Glasgow Caledonians
Try: Warren Lloyd; Adrian Killa; Con: Simon Daniel; Pen: Simon Daniel x 2 Drop: Simon Daniel x 2	Preview; Report	Try: Shaun Longstaff; Ian McInroy; Donnie Macfadyen; Con: Tommy Hayes; Pen: Tommy Hayes; Barry Irving

Referee: H Watkins (Maesteg)

30 October 1999

Neath RFC (Wales)	16 – 24	(Wales) Llanelli RFC

30 October 1999

Newport RFC (Wales)	46 – 13	(Wales) Caerphilly RFC

=== Round 10 ===
2 November 1999

Swansea RFC (Wales)	47 – 13	(Wales) Ebbw Vale RFC

5 November 1999

Bridgend RFC (Wales)	23 – 24	(Scotland) Edinburgh Reivers

5 November 1999

Caerphilly RFC (Wales)	17 – 36	(Wales) Neath RFC

5 November 1999

Glasgow Caledonians (Scotland)	8 – 8	(Wales) Newport RFC
Try: Gordon Simpson; Pen: Tommy Hayes	Report	Try: Ben Breeze; Pen: Gareth Cull

Bridgehaugh Park, Stirling
Referee: I Ramage (Berwick)

5 November 1999

Llanelli RFC (Wales)	33 – 11	(Wales) Pontypridd RFC

=== Round 11 ===
12 November 1999

Glasgow Caledonians (Scotland)	32 – 18	(Wales) Neath RFC
Try: Ian Jardine; Gordon Simpson; Shaun Longstaff; Alan Bulloch x 2 Con: Tommy Hayes x 2 Pen: Tommy Hayes	Report	Try: Andrew Jacobs; Tristan Davies; Con: Pearce; Pen: Rees; Drop: Rees

Hughenden Stadium
Referee: J Fleming (Boroughmuir)

13 November 1999

Dunvant RFC (Wales)	13 – 46	(Wales) Newport RFC

13 November 1999

Ebbw Vale RFC (Wales)	26 – 18	(Wales) Bridgend RFC

13 November 1999

Llanelli RFC (Wales)	37 – 9	(Scotland) Edinburgh Reivers

13 November 1999

Pontypridd RFC (Wales)	61 – 14	(Wales) Caerphilly RFC

13 November 1999

Swansea RFC (Wales)	25 – 34	(Wales) Cardiff RFC

=== Round 12 ===
4 December 1999

Cardiff RFC (Wales)	26 – 22	(Wales) Newport RFC
	Preview; Report

4 December 1999

Ebbw Vale RFC (Wales)	20 – 19	(Wales) Llanelli RFC

4 December 1999

Neath RFC (Wales)	45 – 10	(Wales) Dunvant RFC

4 December 1999

Pontypridd RFC (Wales)	44 – 10	(Scotland) Glasgow Caledonians
Try: Geraint Lewis (no.8); Lamerton; Wyatt; Geraint O Lewis (wing) x 2 Con: Jarvis x 5 Pen: Jarvis x 2		Try: Gordon Simpson; Con: Tommy Hayes; Pen: Tommy Hayes

Referee: D Davies (Llanbradach)

4 December 1999

Swansea RFC (Wales)	24 – 8	(Wales) Bridgend RFC

5 December 1999

Edinburgh Reivers (Scotland)	24 – 6	(Wales) Caerphilly RFC

=== Round 5 rescheduled match ===
23 December 1999

Cardiff RFC (Wales)	41 – 10	(Wales) Pontypridd RFC

=== Round 13 ===
27 December 1999

Llanelli RFC (Wales)	30 – 24	(Wales) Swansea RFC

27 December 1999

Newport RFC (Wales)	27 – 22	(Wales) Neath RFC

28 December 1999

Cardiff RFC (Wales)	43 – 10	(Wales) Bridgend RFC

28 December 1999

Dunvant RFC (Wales)	20 – 43	(Wales) Pontypridd RFC

=== Round 14 ===
3 January 2000

Bridgend RFC (Wales)	10 – 9	(Wales) Llanelli RFC

3 January 2000

Ebbw Vale RFC (Wales)	26 – 18	(Scotland) Glasgow Caledonians
Try: Hawker; Jones; Con: Strange x 2 Pen: Strange x 4	Preview; Report	Try: James Craig; Jason White; Con: Craig Chalmers; Pen: Craig Chalmers x 2

Eugene Cross Park
Referee: N Williams (Bryncoch)

3 January 2000

Pontypridd RFC (Wales)	25 – 7	(Wales) Newport RFC

3 January 2000

Swansea RFC (Wales)	62 – 8	(Wales) Caerphilly RFC

=== Round 13 rescheduled match ===
21 January 2000

Glasgow Caledonians (Scotland)	47 – 10	(Scotland) Edinburgh Reivers
Try: Andy Nicol; Shaun Longstaff; Tommy Hayes; Martin Waite; Glenn Metcalfe; Gordon Bulloch; Con: Tommy Hayes x 4 Pen: Tommy Hayes x 3	Preview; Report	Try: Lucking; Con: Hodge; Pen: Hodge

Hughenden Stadium
Referee: J Fleming (Boroughmuir)

=== Round 15 ===
25 January 2000

Dunvant RFC (Wales)	17 – 30	(Wales) Ebbw Vale RFC

=== Round 14 rescheduled match ===
30 January 2000

Edinburgh Reivers (Scotland)	29 – 7	(Wales) Dunvant RFC

=== Round 16 ===
11 February 2000

Edinburgh Reivers (Scotland)	21 – 18	(Wales) Neath RFC
	Report

12 February 2000

Bridgend RFC (Wales)	28 – 25	(Scotland) Glasgow Caledonians
Try: Ripol; Mafi; Stephens; Durston; Con: Williams; Pen: Williams x 2	Preview; Report	Try: Gordon Bulloch; Donnie Macfadyen; Con: Tommy Hayes x 2 Pen: Tommy Hayes x 2

Referee: D Bevan (Clydach)

12 February 2000

Ebbw Vale RFC (Wales)	29 – 17	(Wales) Newport RFC

12 February 2000

Llanelli RFC (Wales)	74 – 22	(Wales) Caerphilly RFC

12 February 2000

Pontypridd RFC (Wales)	17 – 22	(Wales) Cardiff RFC

12 February 2000

Swansea RFC (Wales)	32 – 20	(Wales) Dunvant RFC

=== Round 13 rescheduled match ===
21 February 2000

Caerphilly RFC (Wales)	15 – 46	(Wales) Ebbw Vale RFC

=== Round 15 rescheduled match ===
26 February 2000

Caerphilly RFC (Wales)	20 – 57	(Wales) Bridgend RFC

=== Round 17 ===
11 March 2000

Cardiff RFC (Wales)	71 – 15	(Wales) Caerphilly RFC

11 March 2000

Dunvant RFC (Wales)	17 – 20	(Wales) Bridgend RFC

11 March 2000

Llanelli RFC (Wales)	57 – 21	(Scotland) Glasgow Caledonians
Try: Cardey x 2 D James; S Easterby; S Jones; Moon; Koloi; N Boobyer; I Boobyer; Con: S Jones x 6	Preview; Report	Try: Martin Waite x 2 Shaun Longstaff; Con: Tommy Hayes x 3

Stradey Park
Referee: R Elliott (Cardiff)

11 March 2000

Neath RFC (Wales)	29 – 25	(Wales) Ebbw Vale RFC

11 March 2000

Newport RFC (Wales)	23 – 21	(Wales) Swansea RFC

11 March 2000

Pontypridd RFC (Wales)	32 – 32	(Scotland) Edinburgh Reivers

=== Round 15 rescheduled matches ===
25 January 2000
postponed to
15 March 2000

Neath RFC (Wales)	37 – 34	(Wales) Pontypridd RFC

25 January 2000
postponed to
16 March 2000

Newport RFC (Wales)	39 – 28	(Scotland) Edinburgh Reivers

=== Round 10 rescheduled match ===
25 March 2000

Cardiff RFC (Wales)	116 – 0	(Wales) Dunvant RFC

=== Round 18 ===
8 April 2000

Bridgend RFC (Wales)	20 – 55	(Wales) Newport RFC

8 April 2000

Caerphilly RFC (Wales)	30 – 34	(Scotland) Glasgow Caledonians
Try: Wilson; John; Watkins; Robinson x 2 Con: John; Pen: Richards	Preview; Preview; Report	Try: Stewart Campbell; Gordon Simpson x 2 Rowen Shepherd x 2 Con: Tommy Hayes x 3 Pen: Tommy Hayes

Victoria Park

8 April 2000

Cardiff RFC (Wales)	51 – 32	(Scotland) Edinburgh Reivers

8 April 2000

Ebbw Vale RFC (Wales)	47 – 26	(Wales) Pontypridd RFC

8 April 2000

Llanelli RFC (Wales)	71 – 24	(Wales) Dunvant RFC

8 April 2000

Swansea RFC (Wales)	52 – 44	(Wales) Neath RFC

=== Round 15 rescheduled match ===
25 January 2000
postponed to
14 April 2000

Glasgow Caledonians (Scotland)	25 – 28	(Wales) Swansea RFC
Try: Jon Petrie x 2 Tommy Hayes; Con: Tommy Hayes; Rowen Shepherd; Pen: Tommy Hayes x 2	Preview; Report	Try: Jenkins; Rees x 2 Con: A Thomas x 2 Pen: A Thomas x 2 Drop: A Thomas

Hughenden Stadium
Referee: J Fleming (Boroughmuir)

=== Round 19 ===
21 April 2000

Cardiff RFC (Wales)	42 – 21	(Scotland) Glasgow Caledonians
Try: Morgan x 2 Thomas; Howley; Botham; Con: Burke x 4 Pen: Burke x 3	Preview; Report	Try: Glenn Metcalfe x 2 Con: Tommy Hayes; Pen: Tommy Hayes x 3

Cardiff Arms Park
Referee: David R Davies (WRU)

21 April 2000

Neath RFC (Wales)	43 – 7	(Wales) Bridgend RFC

22 April 2000

Dunvant RFC (Wales)	17 – 9	(Wales) Caerphilly RFC

25 April 2000

Edinburgh Reivers (Scotland)	42 – 21	(Wales) Ebbw Vale RFC

26 April 2000

Newport RFC (Wales)	59 – 8	(Wales) Llanelli RFC

26 April 2000

Pontypridd RFC (Wales)	17 – 24	(Wales) Swansea RFC

=== Round 20 ===
29 April 2000

Bridgend RFC (Wales)	17 – 31	(Wales) Pontypridd RFC

29 April 2000

Caerphilly RFC (Wales)	14 – 44	(Wales) Newport RFC

29 April 2000

Cardiff RFC (Wales)	48 – 34	(Wales) Ebbw Vale RFC

29 April 2000

Llanelli RFC (Wales)	25 – 24	(Wales) Neath RFC

29 April 2000

Swansea RFC (Wales)	47 – 24	(Scotland) Edinburgh Reivers

30 April 2000

Glasgow Caledonians (Scotland)	35 – 27	(Wales) Dunvant RFC
Try: Gareth Flockhart; Alan Bulloch; Tommy Hayes; Gordon Bulloch; Con: Barry Irving x 3 Pen: Barry Irving x 2 Rowen Shepherd	Preview; Report; Report	Try: Lloyd; Baker x 2 Con: M Thomas x 3 Pen: M Thomas x 2

Bridgehaugh Park, Stirling
Referee: I Ramage (Berwick)

=== Round 14 rescheduled match ===
2 May 2000

Cardiff RFC (Wales)	52 – 27	(Wales) Neath RFC

=== Round 21 ===
5 May 2000

Ebbw Vale RFC (Wales)	16 – 23	(Wales) Swansea RFC

5 May 2000

Neath RFC (Wales)	35 – 35	(Wales) Caerphilly RFC

6 May 2000

Dunvant RFC (Wales)	23 – 36	(Wales) Cardiff RFC

6 May 2000

Newport RFC (Wales)	64 – 29	(Scotland) Glasgow Caledonians
Try: Marinos; Snow; Burn x 4 Taylor; Smith; C Jones x 2 Con: Howarth x 7	Preview; Preview; Report; Report	Try: Alan Watt; Jon Petrie; Martin Waite; Tommy Hayes; Roland Reid; Con: Tommy Hayes; Gordon Bulloch

Rodney Parade
Referee: H Lewis (Cardiff)

7 May 2000

Edinburgh Reivers (Scotland)	34 – 26	(Wales) Bridgend RFC

=== Round 15 rescheduled match ===
10 May 2000

Cardiff RFC (Wales)	38 – 31	(Wales) Llanelli RFC

=== Round 22 ===
12 May 2000

Edinburgh Reivers (Scotland)	51 – 23	(Wales) Llanelli RFC
	Preview; Report

12 May 2000

Neath RFC (Wales)	47 – 10	(Scotland) Glasgow Caledonians
Try: Storey x 2 Tieuti x 2 M Davies; Sidoli; Con: Rees x 4 Pen: Rees x 3	Preview; Report	Try: Roland Reid; Con: Tommy Hayes; Pen: Tommy Hayes

The Gnoll
Referee: T Rowlands (Treorchy)

13 May 2000

Bridgend RFC (Wales)	13 – 12	(Wales) Ebbw Vale RFC

13 May 2000

Caerphilly RFC (Wales)	18 – 54	(Wales) Pontypridd RFC

13 May 2000

Cardiff RFC (Wales)	40 – 41	(Wales) Swansea RFC

13 May 2000

Newport RFC (Wales)	76 – 17	(Wales) Dunvant RFC

=== Round 21 rescheduled match ===
24 May 2000

Pontypridd RFC (Wales)	29 – 12	(Wales) Llanelli RFC
