= 1999–2000 Scottish Inter-District Championship =

Rugby union competition

- Countries: Scotland
- Champions: Glasgow Caledonians
- Runners-up: Edinburgh Reivers
- Matches played: 3

The 1999–2000 Scottish Inter-District Championship was a rugby union competition for Scotland's professional district teams. With the merging of the 4 districts into 2 in 1998; now only Glasgow and Edinburgh were involved in the Scottish Inter-District Championship. Glasgow Caledonians and Edinburgh Reivers then fought it out in a renamed Tri-Series. The previous year this was sponsored by Tennents Velvet, but this year the Tri-Series ran without a sponsor.

Three matches were played between the clubs. Glasgow won the series, beating Edinburgh 2-1. A league table is shown for completeness. Both teams entered the next year's Heineken Cup.

The first Tri-Series game of the season doubled as a fixture in the 1999-2000 season's Welsh-Scottish League.

== 1999-2000 League Table ==
Team	P	W	D	L	PF	PA	+/-	Pts
Glasgow Caledonians	3	2	0	1	104	56	+48	4
Edinburgh Reivers	3	1	0	2	56	104	-48	2

== Results ==
=== Round 1 ===
21 January 2000

Glasgow Caledonians (Scotland)	47 – 10	(Scotland) Edinburgh Reivers
Try: Andy Nicol; Shaun Longstaff; Tommy Hayes; Martin Waite; Glenn Metcalfe; Gordon Bulloch; Con: Tommy Hayes x 4 Pen: Tommy Hayes x 3	Preview; Preview; Report	Try: Lucking; Con: Hodge; Pen: Hodge

Hughenden Stadium
Referee: J Fleming (Boroughmuir)

Glasgow Caledonians: Metcalfe, McInroy, A Bulloch, Jardine, Longstaff, Hayes, Nicol, Hilton, G Bulloch, McIlwham, Campbell, White, Reid, McFadyen, Petrie. Replacements: Irving, Stark, Beveridge, Waite, Burns, Scott.
Edinburgh Reivers: Lang, Milligan, Paterson, Utterson, Sharman, Hodge, Fairley, Stewart, Scott, Proudfoot, Lucking, Fullarton, Mather, Leslie, Hogg. Replacements: Di Rollo, Lee, Burns, Hayter, Dall, McNulty, McKelvey

=== Round 2 ===
25 February 2000

Edinburgh Reivers	24 – 32	Glasgow Caledonians
Try: Derrick Lee; Carl Hogg; Con: Duncan Hodge; Pen: Duncan Hodge x 4	Preview; Report; Report	Try: James Craig; Pen: Tommy Hayes x 9

Riverside Park, Jedburgh
Referee: R Dickson (Madras FP)

Edinburgh Reivers: C Paterson, K Milligan, J Hita, G Shiel, D Lee, D Hodge, G Burns, A Jacobsen, S Scott, B Stewart, A Lucking, I Fullarton, C Mather, C Hogg (G Hayter, 54 min), G Dall.
Glasgow Caledonians: G Metcalfe, S Longstaff, A Bulloch, J Stuart, J Craig, T Hayes, A Nicol, D Hilton, G Scott, G McIlwham, S Campbell (M Waite, 63), J White, R Reid (D Hall, 65), G Simpson, D Macfadyen (J Petrie 28).

=== Round 3 ===
25 March 2000

Glasgow Caledonians	22 – 25	Edinburgh Reivers
Try: Martin Waite; Gordon Simpson x 2 Con: Tommy Hayes x 2 Pen: Tommy Hayes	Preview; Report; Report	Try: Fullarton; Utterson; Pen: Ross x 4 Drop: Ross

Caledonian Stadium, Inverness
Referee: J Hogg (Hawick).

Glasgow Caledonians: R Shepherd; A Bulloch, J Stewart, I Jardine, T Hayes; B Irving, F Stott; D Hilton, G Bulloch, G McIlwham, S Campbell, D Burns, J White, M Waite, G Simpson. Subs: G Scott for Waite 34mins, G Beveridge for Stott 66, A Watt for Hilton, 72.
Edinburgh Reivers: G Kiddie; K Milligan, J Hita, G Shiel, K Utterson; G Ross, I Fairley; A Jacobsen, S Scott, B Stewart, A Lucking, I Fullarton, C Mather, G Hayter, G Dall. Subs: M Proudfoot for Stewart, 51. S Walker for Milligan, 69.
