= Danny Herrington =

Scottish rugby union player

- Born: Danny Herrington; 25 August 1960 Tillicoultry, Scotland
- Died: 26 May 2005 (aged 44)

Rugby union career
- Position: Tighthead Prop
Amateur team(s)
Years	Team	Apps	(Points)
–	Hillfoots		
–	Dundee HSFP RFC		
1995–2002	Kirkcaldy	98	(5)
Senior career
Years	Team	Apps	(Points)
1996-98	Caledonia Reds		
1999-2000	Glasgow Warriors	2	(0)
Provincial / State sides
Years	Team	Apps	(Points)
1990-96	North and Midlands		
International career
Years	Team	Apps	(Points)
1993-95	Scotland A	3	

Danny Herrington (25 August 1960 in Tillicoultry, Scotland – 26 May 2005) was a Scotland A international rugby union footballer. His rugby career spanned the amateur and professional era. He played at Tighthead Prop.

== Amateur career ==
He started playing rugby with amateur club Hillfoots RFC. Both Herrington and John Manson came through the clubs ranks at the same time. Herrington, Manson and 'Budgie' Cairney formed a front row partnership affectionately deemed the 'Tillicoultry Troglodytes'.

From Hillfoots, Herrington moved to Dundee HSFP, along with Manson and Cairney. He was a key member of the Dundee squad and drove the club back into Scottish rugby's top amateur division.

Herrington's impeccable technique in the scrum was such that Scotland's then Director of Rugby Jim Telfer asked him to pass on his knowledge to younger props.

He mentored youngsters in the Dundee team - most notably young prop Tom Smith, who was later to become a British and Irish Lions player.

Smith was to say of his mentoring: "When I joined my first senior club in Dundee, there was an old prop called Danny Herrington, a bit of a local legend, who basically shoved my head up my arse in training, twice a week every week for what seemed like years. Now, that's what you call a learning curve. Those training sessions were my classroom. Danny took the view that a young prop should have his share of bad experiences before trying to inflict them on other people."

He would later move to play for Kirkcaldy RFC.

== Provincial and professional career ==
=== North and Midlands ===
He first played for the amateur district North and Midlands in 1990.

=== Caledonia Reds ===
When Scotland took on the challenges of the professional game, this district became Caledonia Reds in season 1996-97. Herrington also represented this professional provincial side.

Danny won the Scottish Inter-District Championship with Caledonia Reds in 1996-97 season. It was the first Inter-District championship that North and Midlands or Caledonia Reds had won outright and qualified Caledonia Reds to the Heineken Cup.

=== Glasgow Warriors ===
Caledonia Reds folded in 1998 as the SRU cost cut. However Danny's days as a professional player were not yet over. In 2000, he answered Richie Dixon's injury problems by turning out for Glasgow Warriors, then known as Glasgow Caledonians. He made an appearance from the bench against Bridgend RFC and started against Neath RFC in Welsh-Scottish League matches towards the end of 1999-2000 season. He made his Warriors debut at 39 years old and was a grandfather. From his date of birth to 12 February 2000 is 39 years 5 months and 18 days on Warriors debut; and his last Warriors appearance he was aged 39 years 8 months and 18 days; currently the record for Warriors oldest ever player.

== International career ==
It was while Herrington was with Dundee that he received his caps for Scotland A. He received 3 'A' caps in all:- against the All Blacks in 1993; in the victory over France A in Rennes in 1994 and the narrow loss to France A in 1995.

== Tributes ==
Herrington died on 26 May 2005 after a long battle with cancer, aged 44 years old.

The manager of Caledonia Reds, Ian Rankin, called Danny 'Mr Indestructible'. He told the story of the time when 'Mr Indestructible' met 'The Fun Bus' causing not much fun at all for the English prop. This was in a European match against Harlequins, Danny had the then world's most capped player Jason Leonard 'squealing' in the scrums.

John Manson gave this tribute to his former teammate: "Danny is undoubtedly one of those who was unlucky not to play for Scotland, " he said. "He was probably underrated because he didn't necessarily look the part, but the strength he had from being a manual worker made him particularly powerful and made him seem almost indestructible."
