= Alan Brown (rugby union, born 1980) =

Scottish rugby union footballer and coach

- Born: Alan David Brown; 10 September 1980 (age 46) Dundee, Scotland
- Height: 6 ft 4 in (1.93 m)
- Weight: 118 kg (18 st 8 lb)

Rugby union career
- Position: Tighthead Prop
Amateur team(s)
Years	Team	Apps	(Points)
-	Morgan Academy RFC		
–	Dundee HSFP		
Senior career
Years	Team	Apps	(Points)
1999-2001	Glasgow Warriors	3	(0)
2002-05	Glasgow Warriors	7	(0)
International career
Years	Team	Apps	(Points)
-	Scotland U18		
- Scotland U19
- Scotland U20
- Scotland U21
2012	Scotland Club XV		
2014	Barbarians		
Coaching career
- Years: Team
- 2014-2018: Dundee HSFP (Asst.)
- 2018-2020: Strathmore RFC (Head)
- 2020-present: Dundee HSFP

Alan Brown (born 10 September 1980 in Dundee, Scotland) is a former Scotland Club XV international rugby union player for Glasgow Warriors, who played at the Tighthead Prop position, although he could also be used in the Back Row if necessitated. Alan also went on to be a very successful coach after his player and assistant coach days. In 2018 he moved to Strathmore RFC, and in his first season they won the league and gained promotion as well as the quarter-finals of the Scottish cup. Alan then returned to Dundee rugby as head coach for the latter 2020 season. The team competes in the Scottish National League Division One.

== Rugby Union career ==
=== Amateur career ===
From school, Brown joined the amateur side Morgan Academy RFC.

Brown has been at Dundee HSFP since he was 18.

=== Professional career ===
He was in the Glasgow Warriors squad for season 1999 - 2000. He played three match from the bench one against Swansea RFC on 25 November 1999.

Called into the Glasgow squad in 2002-03 and named as substitute in the Celtic League match against Connacht Rugby on 21 February 2002 for the match that weekend; he secured a later part-time contract with the Warriors in 2003-04 season and 2004-05 season but only managed bench spots .

=== International career ===
He is a former Scotland Under 18, Scotland Under 19, Scotland Under 20 and Scotland Under 21 player.

He played for Scotland Club XV in 2012. He also played for the Barbarians

=== Coaching career ===
In 2014 he became player-coach at Dundee HSFP, assisting Head Coach Colin Robertson. During 2018-2020 he was head coach at Strathmore RFC. As of 2020 he is back at Dundee 1st XV
