= Dundee Rugby Club =

Scottish rugby union club, based in Dundee

(Scotland) Dundee Rugby Club
- Union: Scottish Rugby Union
- Founded: 2021; 5 years ago (Dundee HSFP and Morgan Academy merger)
- Location: Dundee, Scotland
- Ground: Mayfield Playing Fields
- President: David Nicoll
- League(s): Men: Scottish National League Division Two; Women: Scottish Women's Midlands & East One
- 2025–26: Men: Scottish National League Division Two, 7th of 10; Women: Scottish Women's Midlands & East One, 1st of 6
Team kit

Official website
- www.dundeerugby.club

Dundee Rugby Club is a rugby union club based in Dundee, Scotland. The club was established in 2021 when Dundee HSFP purchased Morgan Academy.

The men's first team compete in Scottish National League Division Two; the women's side, known as the Dundee Valkyries, play in Scottish Women's Midlands & East One.
