= George Ritchie (rugby union, born 1909) =

Scotland international rugby union player (1909–1993)

- Born: George Ritchie; 1909
- Died: 1993 (aged 83–84)
- School: High School of Dundee; Strathallan School

Rugby union career
- Position: Number Eight
Amateur team(s)
Years	Team	Apps	(Points)
- Dundee HSFP
Provincial / State sides
Years	Team	Apps	(Points)
1930	Midlands District		
International career
Years	Team	Apps	(Points)
1932	Scotland	1	

George Fraser Ritchie (1909–1993) was a Scottish rugby union player. His regular playing position was Number 8.

== Rugby Union career ==
=== Amateur career ===
George Ritchie was educated at the High School of Dundee and Strathallan School in Perthshire. He played his club rugby for Dundee HSFP and was captain for three years between 1928 and 1931.

=== Provincial career ===
Ritchie played for Midlands District.

=== International career ===
Ritchie was capped once in 1932 for Scotland at number eight. He was named in the Scottish trial team of January 1930 but had to wait two years before gaining his cap. Scotland lost to England 16–3 at Twickenham on 19 March. He was the grandfather of noted Scottish rugby player Andy Nicol.

== See also ==
- 1932 Home Nations Championship

== Sources ==
- Bath, Richard (ed.) The Scotland Rugby Miscellany (Vision Sports Publishing Ltd, 2007 ISBN 1-905326-24-6)
