= Darren Burns =

Darren Burns may refer to:

- Darren Burns (rugby league) (born 1974), Australian rugby league footballer
- Darren Burns (rugby union) (born 1973), Scottish rugby union player
