= Richie Dixon =

Scottish rugby union player & coach

- Born: J. Richard Dixon c. 1947 (age 78–79) Chirnside, Scottish Borders, Scotland
- School: Berwickshire High School

Rugby union career
- Position: Wing / Centre / Flanker
Amateur team(s)
Years	Team	Apps	(Points)
-	Jordanhill		
Provincial / State sides
Years	Team	Apps	(Points)
1967 -	Glasgow District		
International career
Years	Team	Apps	(Points)
1978-80	Scotland 'B'	3	
1984	Scotland	1	
–	Barbarians		
Coaching career
- Years: Team
- Glasgow District
- 1995-1998: Scotland
- 1998-1999: London Scottish
- 1999-2002: Glasgow Warriors
- 2002-2009: Scotland (Head of Coach Development)
- 2006-2007: Border Reivers (Asst.)
- 2010-2011: Georgia
- 2012–present: World Rugby (Project Manager)

Richie Dixon (born c. 1947) is a former Scotland international rugby union player, the former head coach of the Scotland national team, the Georgia national team and Glasgow Caledonians (now known as Glasgow Warriors). He was head of Physical Education at Currie High School in Edinburgh from 1972 until 1980.

== Playing career ==
=== Amateur career ===
Born in Chirnside, Berwickshire, Dixon played for Jordanhill.

=== Provincial career ===
As a rugby player he was to captain Glasgow District; the side that was later to become the Glasgow Warriors on professionalism.

He started off playing on the Wing or Centre for Glasgow. Later in his career, he made the switch to Flanker and represented Glasgow there too. It was thought that this utility factor negatively influenced his chances of a senior Scotland cap. In 2024 he got awarded his first cap for Scotland after playing the Netherlands not receiving it when he should have.

The Glasgow Herald of 8 October 1974 commented:

Jordanhill's Richie Dixon began his second district career in that ill-starred Murrayfield inter-city. Having played 22 times for Glasgow on the Wing or Centre between 1967 and 1970, he switched to the pack and re-appeared in the district team as a flanker, but midway in the first half had to go back to full back. The national selectors were reminded that he used to be a back and that seems to have been holding back his career ever since.

=== International career ===
Dixon played for Scotland 'B' on 3 occasions and captained the side each time. He also played for the Barbarians.

He was on the bench for the Scottish International Team and earned his one and only cap against the Netherlands, March 1984. In 2023 the SRU deemed that match a full international and gave Richie Dixon the cap no. 1199.

== Coaching career ==
=== Glasgow District ===
Dixon coached Glasgow District; notably during its famous unbeaten 1989-90 season, winning the Scottish Inter-District Championship outright and topped off with a 22–11 win against Fiji at Hughenden Stadium.

=== Scotland ===
He coached the Scotland B national rugby union team for many years and was also involved in coaching the Sweden national rugby union team.

He was Scotland national rugby union team Head Coach from 1995 to 1998. As Scotland boss he took Scotland to within one game of a grand slam when they were beaten by England at Murrayfield in 1996. Dixon lost his job in 1998 after a defeat by Italy in the warm up to the Five Nations. His success rate in the role for competitive matches was 50% - just below Jim Telfer's 53.8% but ahead of Ian McGeechan's 42%.

==== International matches as head coach ====
Matches (1995–1998)
Matches	Date	Opposition	Venue	Score (Sco.–Opponent)	Competition	Captain
1995
1	18 November	Samoa	Murrayfield Stadium, Edinburgh	15–15	Samoa tour	Rob Wainwright
1996
2	20 January	Ireland	Lansdowne Road, Dublin	16–10	Five Nations	Rob Wainwright
3	3 February	France	Murrayfield Stadium, Edinburgh	19–14	Five Nations	Rob Wainwright
4	17 February	Wales	Arms Park, Cardiff	16–14	Five Nations	Rob Wainwright
5	2 March	England	Murrayfield Stadium, Edinburgh	9–18	Five Nations	Rob Wainwright
6	15 June	New Zealand	Carisbrook, Dunedin	31–62	New Zealand tour	Rob Wainwright
7	22 June	New Zealand	Eden Park, Auckland	12–36	New Zealand tour	Rob Wainwright
8	9 November	Australia	Murrayfield Stadium, Edinburgh	19–29	Australia tour	Gregor Townsend
9	14 December	Italy	Murrayfield Stadium, Edinburgh	29–22	Test match	Gregor Townsend
1997
10	18 January	Wales	Murrayfield Stadium, Edinburgh	19–34	Five Nations	Rob Wainwright
11	1 February	England	Twickenham Stadium, London	13–41	Five Nations	Rob Wainwright
12	1 March	Ireland	Murrayfield Stadium, Edinburgh	38–10	Five Nations	Rob Wainwright
13	15 March	France	Parc des Princes, Paris	20–47	Five Nations	Rob Wainwright
14	22 November	Australia	Murrayfield Stadium, Edinburgh	8–37	Australia tour	Andy Nicol
15	6 December	South Africa	Murrayfield Stadium, Edinburgh	10–68	South Africa tour	Rob Wainwright
1998
16	24 January	Italy	Stadio Comunale di Monigo, Treviso	21–25	Test match	Rob Wainwright

=== London Scottish ===
Dixon had a brief tenure at London Scottish.

=== Glasgow Warriors ===
He took over the Glasgow club from New Zealander Keith Robertson in January 1999. As part of the coaching set-up Rob Moffat joined him as assistant coach.

During Dixon's tenure Glasgow Caledonians dropped its merged identity and rebranded itself back to Glasgow Rugby in 2002.

Dixon was replaced as Warriors boss by New Zealander Kiwi Searancke on 27 June 2002. when he became the SRU's Head of Coach Development. He was to retain some input to the Warriors as he was to become official team manager offering advice to his successor. Glasgow's assistant Rob Moffat was to become Head Coach of the newly reformed Border Reivers.

Searancke's reign at Glasgow was short-lived as it was felt he was overly critical of the players. This meant Dixon had to step in as caretaker in April 2003 when the New Zealander left the club. The caretaker role only lasted a few weeks as the club quickly settled on Hugh Campbell as the new Glasgow Head Coach.

=== Border Reivers ===
As well as Head of Coach Development, Dixon was made Assistant Coach at Border Reivers in 2006. However, financial troubles caused the Borders club to fold in 2007.

=== SRU ===
Dixon held the SRU's coaching development role until 2009 when he fell victim to cost cutting.

=== Georgia ===
In 2010 he was to become the national coach of the Georgian rugby team and coached them at the World Cup. He was awarded the country's Honorary Order of Excellence by the President for services to rugby in Georgia.

=== World Rugby ===
In 2012 he became a project manager for World Rugby advising emergent countries. He has special remit for Georgia and Romania.

== Honours ==
=== As a coach ===
- Scotland
  - Five Nations Championship
    - Runner-up: 1996
  - Centenary Quaich
    - Winner: 1996, 1997
- Glasgow Warriors
  - Scottish Inter-District Championship
    - Winner: 1999-2000

In November 2025 he was inducted into Scottish Rugby's hall of fame.

Preceded by Jim Telfer	Scotland national rugby union team coach 1995-98	Succeeded by Jim Telfer
