= Dougie Hall =

Scotland international rugby union player (born 1980)

- Born: Douglas William Hugh Hall; 24 September 1980 (age 46) Dingwall, Ross and Cromarty, Scotland
- Height: 1.83 m (6 ft 0 in)
- Weight: 105 kg (16 st 7 lb)
- School: Glenalmond College

Rugby union career
- Position: Hooker
Senior career
Years	Team	Apps	(Points)
1999–2002	Glasgow Warriors	9	(0)
2002–2007	Edinburgh Rugby	91	(20)
2007–2015	Glasgow Warriors	142	(30)
International career
Years	Team	Apps	(Points)
2003–2012	Scotland	42	(5)

Dougie Hall (born 24 September 1980) is a former Scottish international rugby union player, who played 151 games for the Glasgow Warriors and won 42 caps for Scotland.

== Background ==
Born in Dingwall, he was educated at Glenalmond College in Perthshire and it was playing for them he was first scouted.

== Career ==
He debuted for Scotland in the second-half defeat against Wales at the age of 22 in August 2003 (23–9). Hall had already represented Scotland at national under-19 and under-21 levels, before starting a training contract with the Glasgow Caledonians (now Glasgow Warriors) before turning professional in 2002.

He began his career with Glasgow in the 1999–00 season, making three substitute appearances in the Welsh-Scottish League and 1 appearance in Scottish Inter-District Championship. He made the bench the following season but did not play. He spent much of the 2001–02 season recovering from a broken leg but played for Glasgow in 5 matches that season.

He then transferred to Edinburgh Rugby where he spent five years learning his craft and cementing his place as Scotland's first-choice hooker. He was selected for the 2007 Rugby World Cup but picked up a knee injury and was forced to withdraw. For the start of the 2007–08 season Hall went back down the M8 to rejoin the Glasgow Warriors. In March 2012 he signed his second contract extension, which runs until 2014.

On 24 March 2015, it was announced Hall would retire at the end of the season and move into a career in financial services. His final game was the PRO12 final won by Glasgow at the end of the 2014/15 season.

Hall's 142 appearances for Glasgow Warriors in his second spell at the Warriors, together with his nine appearances from 1999 to 2002, gives him a total of 151 appearances for the Glasgow club.
