= Gavin Blackburn =

Scottish rugby union player

- Born: Gavin Blackburn
- School: St Ninian's High School, Giffnock

Rugby union career
- Position: Tighthead Prop
Amateur team(s)
| Years | Team | Apps | (Points) |
| 1999 | Glasgow Hawks | | |
| 1999-2001 | Glasgow Southern | | |
| 2001 | Stirling County | | |
Senior career
| Years | Team | Apps | (Points) |
- Saracens
- London Scottish
| 1999-2000 | Glasgow Warriors | 0 | (0) |
International career
| Years | Team | Apps | (Points) |
| - | Scotland U21 | | |
Coaching career
- Years: Team
- 2010-13: Dunfermline RFC
- 2012-present: Scottish Rugby Union Development Officer
- 2014-16: Biggar RFC

Gavin Blackburn is a former Scotland U21 international rugby union player for Glasgow Warriors, who played at the Tighthead Prop position.

Blackburn played for Saracens. He started there as an apprentice.

Blackburn played for London Scottish till 1999, when he was signed by Glasgow Hawks.

He was then called up to Glasgow Warriors. He played in all but one of Glasgow's pre-season friendlies of the 1999 - 2000 season; including the home match against Ulster Rugby and making the trip to Canada to play the Ontario Rugby Union and Uruguay A. The only exception was the final match of the Canadian tour, the Canadian Tri-Continental Tournament final against Edinburgh Rugby, where Blackburn was an unused substitute.

He returned to Glasgow after the successful Canadian tour but his time at the Hawks was short. In November 1999 he was moved on to Glasgow Southern. This move to a lower ranked club effectively ended Blackburn's Warriors career and he did not play a further game for the professional provincial side. Hawks spokesman Hugh Barrow said: "Gavin hasn't been able to establish a regular place since arriving from London Scottish. He can't be blamed for wanting to seek first team action."

In 2001, he moved to Stirling County. An achilles injury curtailed his career.

He later went on to coach Biggar RFC from 2014. "Biggar is a huge club and one I remember playing against," he said. "It was always a hard game and the support was tremendous. They struggled last season but my job will be to create a culture where everybody enjoys rugby and ultimately starts winning again," said the 35-year-old former Dunfermline coach and SRU development officer. "We will look to bring players in but they have to be the right type of player, on and off the pitch." However Blackburn announced he would quit his coaching role in February 2016 due to family commitments and work pressures.
