= Dundee HSFP =

Scottish rugby union club, based in Dundee

(Scotland) Dundee High
- Full name: Dundee High School Former Pupils Rugby Football Club
- Union: SRU
- Founded: 1880
- Disbanded: 2021; 5 years ago
- Location: Dundee, Scotland
- Ground: Mayfield Playing Fields
- President: Derek Black
- Coach: Alan Brown
- Captain: Sean Gauld
1st kit	2nd kit

Dundee HSFP is a former rugby union team that played their home games at the Mayfield Playing Fields, Dundee, Scotland. The club disbanded in 2021.

The team was founded in 1880 by former pupils of the High School of Dundee. The men's side played in Scottish National League Division Two; the women's side, known as the Dundee Valkyries, played in the Scottish Women's Midlands & East One until 2021 when the club merged with Morgan Rugby Club to form "Dundee Rugby Club".

== History ==
=== Beginnings ===
No doubt inspired by Abertay's Louis Auldjo, Dundee's first international rugby player, who had represented Scotland against England at the Oval in 1878, Dundee High School Former Pupils' Rugby Football Club was formed in 1880 by a group of schoolfriends and rugby aficionados, David Hynd, David Hutchison and Tom Ferguson, the principals of the affectionately monikered "Maryfield Gang" after the scrap of wasteland on which they would play after school. With no sport on the school curriculum in the 19th century, the boys passionately followed local teams Abertay and Red Cross and upon leaving school met in The Victoria coffee house on 23 November 1880 and decided to form their own team.

That meeting produced the first office bearers of the club:

1st XV

- Captain: David M Hutchison
- Sub-Captain and Secretary: Thomas C Ferguson
- Treasurer: David Hynd
- Committee: Herbert Bell, James Martin, David Robertson

2nd XV

- Captain: Alexander Hynd
- Sub-Captain: G. Stevenson
- Secretary: William Ross

The club changed to be no longer restricted to former pupils of the high school and was an open club.

== Purchase ==
The club purchased Morgan Academy RFC to form a new club, Dundee Rugby Club, in 2021. One of the main reasons for the purchase was to rescue both clubs and prepare an unrealistic development plan to get the new club into the professional Super 6 league.

== Sevens ==
The club ran the Dundee Sevens tournament. On the club's merger with Morgan in 2021 to form Dundee Rugby a new Sevens tournament began that year to announce the merger. The first winners of the Dundee City Sevens were Blazin’ Squad (Men) and the Howe Harlequins (Women).

== Honours ==
=== Men's ===
- Scottish National League Division One
  - Champions (2): 2005–06, 2008–09
- Scottish National League Division Two
  - Champions (2): 1989–90, 2002–03
- Orkney Sevens
  - Champions (2): 2006, 2007
- Glasgow University Sevens
  - Champions (1): 1996
- Glenrothes Sevens
  - Champions (1): 1991
- Midlands District Sevens
  - Champions (5): 1926, 1930, 1964, 1991, 1992
- Howe of Fife Sevens
  - Champions (1): 1993
- Stirling Sevens
  - Champions (1): 1970

=== Women's ===
- Mull Sevens
  - Champions (1): 2012

== Notable former players ==
=== Men's ===
==== Scotland national rugby union team ====
- Stewart Campbell (17 caps)
- Alasdair Dickinson (58 caps)
- Iain Fullarton (6 caps)
- Sean Lamont (105 caps)
- David Leslie (31 caps, Rugby World's Player of the Year 1984, 5 Nations Grand Slam winner)
- Shaun Longstaff (15 caps)
- John Manson (1 cap)
- Jon Petrie (45 caps)
- George Ritchie (1 cap, first ever DHSFP player to be capped in 1932)
- Richie Vernon (24 caps)

==== British and Irish Lions ====
- Andy Nicol (23 Scotland caps, European Cup 1997/98, World XV v NZ 1993)
- Chris Rea (13 Scotland caps)
- Tom Smith (60 Scotland caps)
- Rob Wainwright (34 Scotland caps)

==== Others ====
- Frank Hadden – Former Scotland coach
- Jason Hewett – New Zealand international
- Jacob Rauluni – Fiji international
- Moses Rauluni – Fiji international
- Adam Russell – United States international
