= Torquil Mathewson =

Scottish rugby union player

- Born: Torquil Mathewson Edinburgh, Scotland

Rugby union career
- Position: Wing
Amateur team(s)
Years	Team	Apps	(Points)
1999-2003	Glasgow Hawks		
2003-	Watsonians		
Senior career
Years	Team	Apps	(Points)
1999-2000	Glasgow Warriors	0	(0)
Provincial / State sides
Years	Team	Apps	(Points)
1995	Glasgow District	1	(0)

Torquil Mathewson is a Scottish former rugby union player who played for Glasgow Warriors at the Wing positions.

Mathewson played for Glasgow University RFC before moving on to Glasgow Academicals RFC. He was part of Glasgow Academicals squad to go to Zimbabwe Victoria Tens tournament. In 1995 he played for the amateur Glasgow District side.

Mathewson played for Glasgow Warriors at the start of the 1999-2000 season. He played in all of Glasgow's pre-season matches that year; scoring a try against Ulster Rugby in the first match and playing in their Canadian tour where he played Ontario, Uruguay A and Edinburgh Reivers.

However he did not receive a contract with Glasgow and played no competitive matches for the club. After the rejection by Glasgow, Mathewson had a trial lined up with Bath Rugby. However that was delayed and Mathewson played for Glasgow Hawks.

In 2003, Mathewson signed for Watsonians.

Leaving rugby, Mathewson was a property developer, a furniture manufacturer, and a marketing consultant.
