= Caledonia Reds =

Defunct Scottish rugby union club, based in Aberdeen & Perth

(Scotland) Caledonia Reds
- Nickname: Reds
- Founded: 1996
- Disbanded: 1998; 28 years ago (merged)
- Location: Aberdeen and Perth
- Ground: McDiarmid Park (Capacity: 10,696)
Team kit

Caledonia Reds were a Scottish rugby union team. They participated in two seasons of the Heineken Cup. They evolved from one of the traditional four amateur districts of Scotland, North and Midlands, in 1996.

Their home games were shared between Aberdeen and Perth. Previous Scottish national coach Frank Hadden once held the assistant coaching position with the Caledonia Reds.

In 1998, the SRU decided to merge the side with the Glasgow Rugby team, who today are known as the Glasgow Warriors.

The Caledonia district still exists: it does not field a side in the United Rugby Championship league, but it does have competitive age grade teams in Inter-District Championships.

== History ==
=== Formation ===
In 1995, with the arrival of professionalism in rugby union, the Scottish Rugby Union (SRU) realised their existing clubs would not be able to compete in the modern era alongside their English and French counterparts. After a year of debate of how to deal with professionalism, in 1996 they decided the best solution would be to create four professional provincial clubs based on the existing traditional amateur district sides of Scotland.

The amateur Edinburgh District was professionalised as Edinburgh Rugby; the amateur Glasgow District became Glasgow Rugby; the amateur South district became Border Reivers. The largest district by area covering north and central Scotland was represented by the amateur district side North and Midlands – and this was professionalised to become Caledonia Reds.

The Reds struggled most out of the new professional teams for three main reasons. Demographically, the population was too scattered to support a single team, which wasn't helped by having both Aberdeen and Perth homes. The 90 miles between the two cities meant that the team couldn't create a devoted and central heartland of support. The popularity of football in the area meant the club found it hard to get the numbers of supporters they needed to sustain themselves.

=== Early success and a glimmer of hope ===
Even with the doubts over the district's potential, they won the first Inter-District Championship of Scotland's Professional era in 1996–97. This came as a great surprise to everyone and there was great hope that this would show when the side was entered into the 1996–97 Heineken Cup. This hope did not come to fruition and the team came out without a win and bottom of their pool, though being involved in some very close scoring matches against teams such as eventual winners CA Brive. In the next season's competition they started to show potential with some more close-scoring matches but once again failed to qualify for the knockout stages.

=== Decline and merger ===
By 1998 the news emerged that the SRU had become laden with over £20 million of debt, largely due to the expensive redevelopment of the national stadium, Murrayfield.

The decision was taken that the continuation of four professional district teams was uneconomical. A plan was drawn up to create two new 'super-clubs' with the mergers of the four existing teams. Edinburgh Rugby and the Border Reivers were merged to create the Edinburgh Reivers while the Caledonia Reds and Glasgow Rugby were merged to create the Glasgow Caledonian Reds.

Despite the mergers, the new 'super-clubs' continued to struggle. Glasgow Caledonians initially played matches in Aberdeen, Perth and Glasgow but this proved unsustainable in terms of support. Later matches were solely based in Glasgow and after only three-years the club dropped the Caledonian element and reverted to 'Glasgow Rugby'. This rebranding was also short-lived and the club was renamed to take into account of Glasgow's warrior logo and thus became Glasgow Warriors.

=== Reds revival ===
In April 2014, 16 years after being disbanded, a Caledonia Reds team played a couple of invitation matches against Co-Optimist RFC and Newcastle Falcons.

== Honours ==
- Scottish Inter-District Championship
  - Champion: 2 (1996–97, 2022-23)

== Playing record ==
=== Friendlies ===
9 August 1997

| Caledonia Reds (Scotland) | 16–21 | (Ireland) Munster |
| Try: Gray; Con: Easson; Pen: Oddie x 3 | | Try: Crotty; Quinlan; Leahy; Pen: Thomson x 2 |

Beveridge Park, Kirkcaldy
Referee: R Easton (Wade)

Caledonia Reds – A Newman; N Renton, P Rouse, A Carruthers, D Gray; B Easson, C Black; J Manson, S Brown, S Penman, S Grimes, S Campbell, D McIvor, S Hannah, M Waite. Replacements: G Hayter for Hannah, A Common for Rouse, G Kiddie for Carruthers, K Oddie for Eason, A Hose for Black, G Scott for Brown, J Van der Esch for Manson, J White for Campbell.

Munster – D Crotty; A Horgan, S McCahill, A McGrath, A Thompson; C Mahoney, B O'Meara; I Murray, M McDermott, P Clohessy, M Galwey, S Leahy, A Quinlan, D Wallace, A Foley. Replacements: F Sheahan for McDermott, G Tuohy for Quinlan.

28 August 1997

| Caledonia Reds (Scotland) | 16–28 | (Scotland) Glasgow |
| Try: Murray Fraser; Con: Rowen Shepherd; Pen: Rowen Shepherd x 3 | Report | Try: Tommy Hayes; Matt McGrandles; Fraser Stott; Con: Tommy Hayes x 2 Pen: Tommy Hayes x 3 |

Bridgehaugh Park, Stirling
Referee: Referee – A Ireland (Grangemouth).

Caledonia Reds – Caledonia Reds – Shepherd; Renton, Rouse, Carruthers, Longstaff; Easson, Black; Penman, Scott, Manson, White, Grimes, McIvor, Flockhart, Waite. Substitutes – Fraser for Carruthers (39m), Hayter for Waite (40), Herrington for Penman (40), Officer for Rouse (53), Penman for Manson (75).

Glasgow – Simmers; Stark, Bulloch, McGrandles, Metcalfe; Hayes, Stott; McIlwham, Bulloch, Beckham, Farquhar, Perrett, F Wallace, McLeish, M Wallace. Shaw for McLeish. Substitutes – Kittle for McIlwham (40), Ablett for A Bulloch (65), Porte for Beckham, Docherty for G Bulloch.

31 October 1997

| Caledonia Reds (Scotland) | 52–21 | (Ireland) Connacht |
| | Preview |

Beveridge Park, Kirkcaldy

=== Heineken Cup ===
==== 1996–97 ====
Pool 3

| Team | P | W | D | L | TF | PF | PA | +/- | Pts |
|---|---|---|---|---|---|---|---|---|---|
| (France) Brive | 4 | 4 | 0 | 0 | 13 | 106 | 65 | +41 | 8 |
| (England) Harlequins | 4 | 3 | 0 | 1 | 20 | 131 | 95 | +36 | 6 |
| (Wales) Neath | 4 | 2 | 0 | 2 | 10 | 83 | 109 | -26 | 4 |
| (Ireland) Ulster | 4 | 1 | 0 | 3 | 6 | 75 | 87 | -12 | 2 |
| (Scotland) Caledonia Reds | 4 | 0 | 0 | 4 | 13 | 117 | 156 | -39 | 0 |

1996-10-13
14:30

| Caledonia Reds (Scotland) | 34–41 | (Ireland) Ulster Rugby |

McDiarmid Park
Attendance: 2,400

1996-10-16
19:15

| Neath RFC (Wales) | 27–18 | (Scotland) Caledonia Reds |

The Gnoll
Attendance: 2,000

1996-10-20
15:00

| Caledonia Reds (Scotland) | 30–32 | (France) CA Brive |

McDiarmid Park
Attendance: 2,000

1996-11-02
14:30

| Harlequins (England) | 56–35 | (Scotland) Caledonia Reds |

Twickenham Stoop
Attendance: 3,751

==== 1997–98 ====
Pool 5

| Team | P | W | D | L | TF | PF | PA | +/- | Pts |
|---|---|---|---|---|---|---|---|---|---|
| (France) Pau | 6 | 4 | 0 | 2 | 27 | 203 | 89 | +114 | 8 |
| (Wales) Llanelli | 6 | 4 | 0 | 2 | 15 | 144 | 142 | +2 | 8 |
| (Italy) Benetton Treviso | 6 | 2 | 0 | 4 | 18 | 146 | 162 | −16 | 4 |
| (Scotland) Caledonia Reds | 6 | 2 | 0 | 4 | 8 | 89 | 189 | −100 | 4 |

1997-09-07
15:00

| Caledonia Reds (Scotland) | 18–23 | (Wales) Llanelli RFC |

McDiarmid Park
Attendance: 2,300

1997-09-14
15:00

| Caledonia Reds (Scotland) | 17–9 | (Italy) Benetton Treviso |
| | Report |

McDiarmid Park
Attendance: 2,000

1997-09-20
18:00

| Pau (France) | 50–28 | (Scotland) Caledonia Reds |

Stade Municipal du Hameau
Attendance: 6,500

1997-09-27
15:00

| Benetton Treviso (Italy) | 52–6 | (Scotland) Caledonia Reds |

Stadio Comunale di Monigo
Attendance: 3,500

1997-10-05
15:00

| Caledonia Reds (Scotland) | 30–24 | (France) Pau |

McDiarmid Park
Attendance: 3,000

1997-10-11
14:00

| Llanelli RFC (Wales) | 31–10 | (Scotland) Caledonia Reds |

Stradey Park
Attendance: 3,000

=== Scottish Inter-District Championship ===
1996–97

Caledonia's first and only title in their first 43 years came in the first championship in a professional form. Caledonia Reds, The Borders and Glasgow qualified for the Heineken Cup for the next season.

| Team | P | W | D | L | PF | PA | +/- | Pts |
|---|---|---|---|---|---|---|---|---|
| Caledonia Reds | 3 | 2 | 1 | 0 | 77 | 53 | +24 | 5 |
| Glasgow | 3 | 2 | 0 | 1 | 63 | 51 | +12 | 4 |
| Border Reivers | 3 | 1 | 1 | 1 | 59 | 61 | -2 | 3 |
| Edinburgh | 3 | 0 | 0 | 3 | 35 | 69 | -34 | 0 |

22 December 1996

| Border Reivers | 26–26 | Caledonia Reds |
| | Report |

Murrayfield Stadium
Referee: R Megson

29 December 1996

| Edinburgh | 13–31 | Caledonia Reds |
| | Report |

Murrayfield Stadium
Referee: E Murray

5 January 1997

| Caledonia Reds | 20–14 | Glasgow |
| | Report |

Murrayfield Stadium
Referee: I Ramage

1997–98

| Team | P | W | D | L | PF | PA | +/- | Pts |
|---|---|---|---|---|---|---|---|---|
| Edinburgh | 3 | 2 | 0 | 1 | 76 | 55 | +21 | 4 |
| Glasgow | 3 | 2 | 0 | 1 | 67 | 49 | +18 | 4 |
| Caledonia Reds | 3 | 2 | 0 | 1 | 49 | 54 | -5 | 4 |
| Border Reivers | 3 | 0 | 0 | 3 | 34 | 68 | -34 | 0 |

17 October 1997

| Border Reivers | 15–20 | Caledonia Reds |
| Try: Nicol; Stanger; Con: Aitchison; Pen: Welsh | Report | Try: Derrick Patterson; Pen: Mark McKenzie; Rowen Shepherd x 4 |

Riverside Park, Jedburgh
Referee: J.R. Dickson (Madras FP)

26 October 1997

| Edinburgh | 25–9 | Caledonia Reds |
| Try: Dall; Burns; Pen: Hodge x 5 | Report | Pen: Rowen Shepherd x 3 |

Inverleith Park
Referee: C Muir (Langholm)

4 January 1998

| Caledonia Reds | 20–14 | Glasgow |
| Try: John Manson; Dave McIvor; Con: Rowen Shepherd x 2 Pen: Rowen Shepherd x 2 | Report | Try: Chris Simmers; Gordon Bulloch; Con: Tommy Hayes x 2 |

Rubislaw Playing Fields
Attendance: 2000
Referee: J Fleming (Boroughmuir)

== Potential revival ==
The effects of the merger were disappointing as the two superclubs underperformed against Welsh and Irish sides, and the expected boost in attendances from the merger did not immediately materialise. The Edinburgh and Glasgow clubs dropped their merged identities and reverted to their previous names, while in 2002 the Border Reivers were revived before folding again in 2007. The decision to revive the Borders rather than Caledonia side was attacked by former Reds coach Robin Lind who said "We’ve got bigger companies, more schools than the Borders, and just as much identity as the Borders, so why are we not getting a team?”. A SRU official responded "I agree that there is vibrancy here, and I think Caledonia should have a pro team as soon as possible – every youngster in Scotland should be able to go and see pro rugby being played in their area. [But] there has to be money spent before that happens, and that would include facilities and pitches."

It has been a long-standing ambition of the SRU to re-expand to four teams again, which would give Scotland equal representation with the Irish and Welsh in the Pro14 league. When Caledonia Red was originally merged with Glasgow in 1998, the SRU claimed that it would be revived in some form when more funds were available. This remains unlikely until the SRU's finances improve. In recent years the SRU has shown more interest in expanding into England, and making London Scottish its third member of the Celtic League than restarting one of the existing regions in Scotland, particularly in the north where the roots are not as deep.

In spite of this there is a small but vocal group of rugby supporters of the former Caledonia region who still lobby for a return of the team, with some calling for them to play their matches at Pittodrie the stadium of Aberdeen. In 2005 the new SRU President Andy Irvine claimed he wanted a professional team established in Aberdeen within three years, although nothing subsequently became of it.

On several occasions details have surfaced of attempts to establish a professional rugby union club in the Caledonia district. A notable incident was one of Graham Burgess, "and his consortium". Burgess was said to have held, "talks" with the SRU in April and May 2007. Plans were said to centre on founding a team in Stirling playing at Forthbank Stadium. However plans drew criticism from some as Burgess was suspected of merely wishing to relocate Glasgow Warriors or the doomed Border Reivers. Dialogue failed to produce anything substantive and no further action was taken; Burgess later died in September 2011. In the month of November 2007 reports emerged of a consortium looking to establish an 'Aberdeen pro team', and the SRU asked Aberdeen F.C. about using Pittodrie. The bid was later rejected. In May 2012, the Chairman of the SRU, Sir Moir Lochead, declared that "the Irish model is what we are trying to replicate now". This renewed hope for a return of the 4 Scottish Districts of the early professional years, to compare with the 4 provinces of the Irish model.

== Notable former players ==
- (Scotland) Willie Anderson
- (Scotland) Stewart Campbell
- (Scotland) Alasdair Dickinson
- (Scotland) Stuart Grimes
- (Scotland) Gareth Flockhart
- (Scotland) Gregor Hayter
- (Scotland) Danny Herrington
- (Scotland) John Kerr
- (Scotland) Graeme Kiddie
- (Scotland) Shaun Longstaff
- (Scotland) John Manson
- (Scotland) Dave McIvor
- (Scotland) Kevin McKenzie
- (Scotland) Mark McKenzie
- (Scotland) James McLaren
- (Scotland) David Officer
- (Scotland) Jamie Murray
- (Scotland) Derrick Patterson
- (Scotland) Rowen Shepherd
- (Scotland) Gordon Simpson
- (Scotland) Gavin Scott
- (Scotland) Tom Smith
- (Scotland) Jason White
- (Scotland) Rob Wainwright
- (Scotland) Martin Waite

=== 1997–98 squad ===
Backs:
C Black (Edinburgh Academicals)
A Carruthers (Kirkcaldy)
J Kerr (Watsonians)
Graeme Kiddie (Edinburgh Academicals)
S Longstaff (Dundee HSFP)
M McKenzie (Stirling County)
K Oddie (Aberdeen GSFP)
D Officer (Currie)
N Renton (Kirkcaldy)
P Rouse (Dundee HSFP)
R Shepherd (Melrose)
P Simpson (Edinburgh Academicals)

Forwards:
W Anderson (Kirkcaldy)
S Brown (Kirkcaldy)
S Campbell (Melrose)
G Flockhart (Stirling County)
I Fullarton (Dundee HSFP)
S Grimes (Watsonians)
J Manson (Stirling County)
C McDonald (Kirkcaldy)
D McIvor (Glenrothes)
K McKenzie (Stirling County)
S Penman (Boroughmuir)
T Smith (Watsonians)
R Wainwright (Watsonians)
M Waite (Edinburgh Academicals)

== Former staff ==
- (Scotland) Frank Hadden
- (Scotland) Ian Rankin
- (Scotland) Robin Lind
