= Ashley Bond =

Australian rugby union player

- Born: Ashley James Bond Perth, Australia
- University: Curtin University
- Occupation: Rugby player

Rugby union career
- Position: Centre
Amateur team(s)
Years	Team	Apps	(Points)
- City of Derry R.F.C.
–	Sportive Ortheziene		
–	Inishowen		
–	City of Derry R.F.C.		
–	Kowloon		
Senior career
Years	Team	Apps	(Points)
1999-2000	Glasgow Warriors	2	(0)

Ashley Bond (born in Perth, Australia) is a former rugby union player. He played professionally for Glasgow Warriors and at amateur level for City of Derry R.F.C. and Sportive Ortheziene, normally playing at the Centre position.

Bond played for City of Derry R.F.C. in the season 1999–2000. He was their overseas registered player. He then moved on to Sportive Ortheziene in France.

He then played for Glasgow Warriors in two matches in the Welsh-Scottish League; against Dunvant away and against Newport at home in 1999. While with Glasgow he also played with amateur club Currie RFC.

In 2001, Bond moved back to Ireland. He played for junior club Inishowen but played for Derry in a few games as a dual status player. Unfortunately for the Northern Irish side, the rules stated that they could only play one oversea player. Derry had already signed New Zealander Ray Malesala, so playing Ashley Bond was deemed a breach. Derry was fined £4000 and docked 8 points in the league.

Bond later went on to captain Kowloon RFC in Hong Kong.
