= Gareth Flockhart =

Scottish rugby union player (born 1972)

- Born: Gareth Flockhart; 11 May 1972 (age 54) Stirling, Scotland
- Height: 6 ft 3 in (1.91 m)
- School: Alva Academy
- University: University of Edinburgh

Rugby union career
- Position: Flanker
Amateur team(s)
Years	Team	Apps	(Points)
- Stirling County
–	Currie RFC		
–	North Berwick RFC		
Senior career
Years	Team	Apps	(Points)
1996-98	Caledonia Reds		
1998–2002	Glasgow Warriors	50	(20)
Provincial / State sides
Years	Team	Apps	(Points)
- North and Midlands
International career
Years	Team	Apps	(Points)
- Scotland A
National sevens team
Years	Team		Comps
- Scotland 7s

Gareth Flockhart (born 11 May 1972 in Scotland) is a Scottish former Scotland A international rugby union player who played for Glasgow Warriors and Caledonia Reds at the Flanker position.

He played for amateur sides Stirling County and Currie RFC. He also played Sevens for Watsonians. He now plays for North Berwick RFC.

He played in the district side and had a tour in Zimbabwe but did not receive a full Scotland cap. A call for full respective caps to be given to Flockhart and others to the SRU was made in 2009.

Flockhart began his professional career with Caledonia Reds in 1996 before they merged with the Glasgow side in 1998. Flockhart then joined Glasgow Caledonians, now Glasgow Warriors for the next four seasons. He was part of the Glasgow side that played against the touring South Africa in 2000. He played in the fledgling Celtic League in its first season (2001–02) making 5 appearances and scoring 2 tries for Glasgow.

Flockhart returned to the Glasgow Warriors side in 2002 to replace the injured Gprdon Simpson.

In 2009, he was part of the veteran Scotland stars side the Bone Steelers at the Dubai Sevens.

Flockhart went to the University of Edinburgh and received a BSc in Agriculture. He now works for crop nutrition company Yara.
