= Morgan Academy RFC =

Scottish rugby union club, based in Dundee

(Scotland) Morgan Rugby Club
- Full name: Morgan Academy RFC
- Founded: 1933
- Disbanded: 2021
- Location: Dundee, Scotland
- Ground: Forfar Road

Official website
- www.morganrugby.co.uk

Morgan Academy RFC was an amateur rugby union team based in Dundee, Scotland.

They competed in the league until 2021 when Dundee HSFP and Morgan Academy RFC merged to create Dundee Rugby Club.

== History ==
It was originally for the former pupils of Morgan Academy, a secondary school in Dundee. It was formed in 1933.

It was also known as Morgan Rugby Club or Morgan Dundee, having dropped the restriction on solely former academy pupils playing for the club.

== Purchase ==
The club was purchased by Dundee HSFP to form a new club Dundee Rugby in 2021. One of the main reasons for the purchase was to save rugby union in Dundee and then attempt to get the new club into the professional Super 6 league.

== Notable players ==
=== North and Midlands ===
The following former Morgan Academy RFC players have represented North and Midlands at provincial level.

- (Scotland) D. Oglivie

== Honours ==
- Crieff Sevens
  - Champions: 1988
- Waid Academy Sevens
  - Champions: 1961, 1962, 1963, 1966, 1980, 1990
- Hillfoot Sevens
  - Champions: 1990
- Kirkcaldy Sevens
  - Champions: 2010
