= Willie Anderson (rugby union, born 1967) =

Scottish rugby union player

- Born: William Anderson; 17 September 1967 (age 59) Kirkcaldy, Scotland
- Height: 5 ft 11 in (1.80 m)
- Weight: 114 kg (17 st 13 lb; 251 lb)

Rugby union career
- Position: Tighthead Prop
Amateur team(s)
Years	Team	Apps	(Points)
1986–2001	Kirkcaldy	136	(14)
Senior career
Years	Team	Apps	(Points)
1996–1998	Caledonia Reds		
1998–2001	Glasgow Warriors	20	(0)
Provincial / State sides
Years	Team	Apps	(Points)
- North and Midlands
International career
Years	Team	Apps	(Points)
	Scotland A	11	
1998	Scotland	1	

Willie Anderson (born 17 September 1967) is a former Scotland international rugby union player for Glasgow Warriors, who played at the Tighthead Prop position.

== Rugby Union career ==
=== Amateur career ===
Anderson started playing at amateur club Kirkcaldy RFC.

=== Professional career ===
When professionalism was introduced in Scotland, Anderson joined the Caledonia Reds side. No fewer than 9 Kirkcaldy players played in the Caledonia Reds team in the Heineken Cup of this era The Caledonia Reds won the first Scottish Inter-District Championship in the Scottish professional era in 1996–97 season.

Unfortunately the Scottish Rugby Union (SRU) could not afford four district teams at this time. They disbanded Caledonia Reds and merged the district into that of the Glasgow Warriors, which was known then as Glasgow Caledonians. Anderson was one of the lucky players that was taken on by the Glasgow side in 1998.

Anderson went on to play with Glasgow to 2001; he struggled with injury in 2000 with a detached bicep muscle and mutually agreed to a release in his contract in January 2001. However he was later included in the Scotland A squad of March 2001.

=== International career ===
Internationally, Anderson had 11 eleven appearances at Scotland 'A' and a test appearance against Spain in Rugby World Cup qualification. Jim Telfer said of Anderson's call up for the Spain match: "Willie has been performing very well for Glasgow Caledonians this season and we want to give him a shot at this level to see how he does. Hopefully, this will be a stern test."

There had been calls for these test appearances - including in the Spain match - to be designated as a full Scotland cap by the SRU; Anderson is one of 30 players who could be retrospectively given a full Scotland cap if the SRU follows the Scottish Football Association's example and belatedly honours their players. Anderson said this of his wish for a full Scotland cap: "I have been following and playing rugby since I was a small schoolkid, and it would be my ultimate ambition to get a Scotland cap." In August 2023 Anderson was included in a list of 56 players to be awarded international caps retrospectively for games not classed as Tests at the time.

This was finally done by the SRU on 15 August 2023. Anderson's match against Spain was given full status; and Anderson was given a full senior Scotland cap. He is cap number 1197 for Scotland.

=== Coaching career ===
Anderson has coached the under-18 team at Kirkcaldy RFC.
