= Strathmore RFC =

Scottish rugby union club, based in Forfar

Coordinates: 56.64267°N 2.90616°W

(Scotland) Strathmore RFC
- Union: Scottish Rugby Union
- Founded: 1933; 93 years ago
- Location: Forfar, Scotland
- Ground: Inchmacoble Park
- League(s): Men: Scottish National League Division Three; Women: Scottish Women's Midlands & East One
- 2024–25: Men: Scottish National League Division Four, 1st of 9 (promoted); Women: Scottish Women's Midlands & East One, 5th of 6
Team kit

Strathmore RFC is a rugby union club based in Forfar, Scotland. The men's side currently compete in Scottish National League Division Three, the women's side currently compete in Scottish Women's Midlands & East One. The club play their home matches at Inchmacoble Park. The club also fields a rugby league team, the Strathmore Silverbacks.

== Junior section ==
The club run a Junior team named Strathmore Sharks.

== Sevens ==
The club run the Strathmore Sevens tournament.

== Notable players ==
=== Women ===
==== Scotland Internationalists ====
- (Scotland) Suzy Newton. Glenn Feighan

=== Men ===
==== Midlands District players ====
- (Scotland) Dave Steele
- (Scotland) John Easson
- (Scotland) Graeme Bell
- (Scotland) Grant Lawrence
- (Scotland) Ken Gillies
- (Scotland) Darren Russell

==== Scotland Rugby League Internationalists ====
- (Scotland) Murray Mitchell

== Honours ==
- Scottish National League Division Four
  - Champions: 2024–25
- Caledonia League Division One
  - Champions (4): 2005-06, 2006–07, 2010–11, 2018–19
- Midlands League
  - Champions (1): 1978
