= John Manson =

Scotland international rugby union player

- Born: John James Manson; 22 June 1968 (age 58) Bridge of Allan, Scotland

Rugby union career
- Position: Prop
Amateur team(s)
Years	Team	Apps	(Points)
- Hillfoots
–	Dundee HSFP RFC		
–	Stirling County		
–	West of Scotland		
Senior career
Years	Team	Apps	(Points)
1996–98	Caledonia Reds		
1998–99	Glasgow Warriors	(0)	(0)
Provincial / State sides
Years	Team	Apps	(Points)
- North and Midlands
International career
Years	Team	Apps	(Points)
- Scotland

John Manson (born 22 June 1968) is a retired Scottish international rugby union footballer who played with the Caledonia Reds and Glasgow Warriors, two of Scotland's first professional rugby teams.

== Rugby Union career ==
=== Amateur career ===
Manson played for Hillfoots, Dundee HSFP, Stirling County, and West of Scotland FC at amateur level.

Manson, while with the Dundee side, was one of the original Tillicoultry Trogs who brought the hard edge to Dundee HSFP's pack in the club's heyday in the early nineties. Alongside front row companion Danny Herrington, Manson made sure one of Scotland's future heroes, Prop Tom Smith had a tough fight to see 1st XV action with the club. Manson was part of the historic unbeaten NZ tour of 1992, the first ever by a British club side.

=== Professional career ===
When Scottish rugby turned its district sides professional in 1996, Manson first of all played for Caledonia Reds. When the Reds district was taken over by Glasgow, Manson then played for the Glasgow side.

Manson played for Glasgow Warriors, then as Glasgow Caledonians, in friendly matches of the 1998–99 season. He played against Richmond, Māori All Blacks and Fiji.

Manson has also played against some notable touring teams including the ACT Brumbies.

=== International career ===
Manson was capped seven times for Scotland A and represented Scotland for Select and Development XV's against the touring All Blacks and Springboks in 1993 and 1994 respectively. He earned his only full Scotland cap 1995 as a replacement against England at Twickenham. Manson went on to tour South Africa with the 1995 World Cup Squad where he was an unused replacement in Scotland's record 89–0 win over the Ivory Coast.

==== Caps ====
===== Scotland full caps =====
- 1995 England (r), South Africa (1995 Rugby World Cup)

===== Scotland A Caps =====
- 1995 ITA, FRA, IRE 1996 SAA 1997 WAL(r), FRA(r), ENG

===== Scotland Development XV =====
- 1994 SA

===== Scotland Select =====
1993 NZ

=== Managerial career ===
Manson was the Scottish Rugby Union's Regional Development Manager for the Central & West Lothian area and was also the assistant manager for the National U18 Squad.

In 2019 Manson was hired as Rugby Operations Manager for Old Glory DC.

In 2021 Manson returned to Scotland is currently the Team Manager at Glasgow Warriors.
