= Mayfield Playing Fields =

Sports grounds in Dundee, Scotland

Coordinates: 56.47025°N 2.93750°W

Mayfield Playing Fields, in Dundee, Scotland, is one of the sports grounds for the High School of Dundee and the home ground of rugby clubs Dundee High Rugby and its junior side, Dundee Eagles. It is situated 1.5 miles from the city centre, on Arbroath Road.

Mayfield was formerly part of the grounds of Mayfield House, a mansion designed by Peddie and Kinnear and owned by William Dalgleish: by the 1880s, he had purchased the land to the east of his house from Robert McGavin of Ballumbie. The Dundee College of Education was established in 1906 after the St Andrews Provincial Committee for the Training of Teachers decided to locate in the city, and Mayfield House was acquired at a reduced price in 1912 as a hostel for women students (later becoming mixed-sex).

By 1921, the playing fields had been laid out, and a clubhouse built, for a University Recreation Ground. In 1975 a new home was built for the college in West Ferry, and the High School purchased the recreation ground and sports facilities: the halls of residence remained for some years, before they were demolished for new housing. The School was thus able to supplement its existing recreation grounds at Dalnacraig, which lie almost directly across Arbroath Road, and vacate the grounds they had occupied since 1959 at Monymusk Park.

Mayfield Sports Centre was opened in June 2006 at a cost of £3.2 million, comprising a large sports hall, gymnasium, dance studio, fitness centre and classroom areas, enhancing the facilities available to the school; it is also available for use by the wider community.
