= Donnie Macfadyen =

Scotland international rugby union player

- Born: 11 October 1979 (age 47) Edinburgh, Scotland
- Height: 1.80 m (5 ft 11 in)
- University: Brunel University
- Notable relative(s): Donald Macfadyen, Lord Macfadyen, father
- Occupation: Rugby player

Rugby union career
- Position: Flanker
Amateur team(s)
Years	Team	Apps	(Points)
- Edinburgh Academicals
Senior career
Years	Team	Apps	(Points)
- London Scottish
1999-2008	Glasgow Warriors	131	(80)
International career
Years	Team	Apps	(Points)
- Scotland U21
–	Scotland A		
–	Scotland	11	(10)

1st Sir Willie Purves Quaich
- In office 2000–2000
- Succeeded by: Andrew Wilson

Donald John Hunter Macfadyen (born 11 October 1979) is a former Scotland international rugby union player. He played as a Flanker. He made over 100 appearances for Glasgow Warriors from 1999 to 2008.

== Rugby Union career ==
=== Amateur career ===
Macfadyen played for Edinburgh Academicals at an amateur level before being signed for Glasgow Warriors.

=== Professional career ===
He played for London Scottish but the club went into administration, and he returned to Scotland.

He played for Glasgow Warriors from 1999 and racked up well over a hundred caps. He retired from rugby in 2008.

=== International career ===
He was the Lloyds TSB Young Player of the Year in season 1999–2000, during which he played eight times for Scotland under-21, seven as captain.

Donnie captained Scotland under-21 throughout the Southern Hemisphere Alliance tournament in the summer of 2000, including the draw against Australia and the victory against Tonga.

The following season, 2000–2001, he captained Scottish Students against both their French and Welsh counterparts, and last season he played in the corresponding game against the French.

It was as a substitute that he had his first appearance for Scotland A, when he was introduced in the 33–13 victory against Italy A at Old Anniesland in March 2001. Recently, he has played for Scotland A in the Churchill Cup, captaining the side twice.

He also made an uncapped appearance for Scotland against the Barbarians, scoring a try at Murrayfield Stadium.

He returned to national rugby with a replacement appearance against Ireland A in March 2002, and he played for Scottish Students against their French counterparts at Inverleith later that month.

Macfadyen made his full senior Scotland debut as a substitute in the rugby union tour international match against Canada in Vancouver, and his first Test selection followed against United States a week later in San Francisco.

He appeared in all six matches on that tour, three as a replacement.
