= Darren Burns (rugby union) =

Scottish rugby union player

- Born: Darren Burns; 8 March 1973 (age 53) Biggar, Scotland
- Height: 6 ft 4 in (1.93 m)
- Weight: 100 kg (15 st 10 lb; 220 lb)

Rugby union career
- Position: Lock
Amateur team(s)
Years	Team	Apps	(Points)
- Boroughmuir RFC
- Biggar RFC
2001	Watsonians		
Senior career
Years	Team	Apps	(Points)
1996-99	Edinburgh Rugby		
1999-2001	Glasgow Warriors	16	(0)
International career
Years	Team	Apps	(Points)
-	Scotland U21		
–	Scotland A		
National sevens team
Years	Team		Comps
1999-2005	Scotland 7s		
Coaching career
- Years: Team
- Queensferry RFC
- –: Biggar RFC
- –: SRU Student & Ad. Participation Mger

Darren Burns (born 8 March 1973 in Biggar, Scotland) is a former Scotland A and Scotland 7s international rugby union player who played for Glasgow Warriors. He played in the Lock position.

Burns signed for Glasgow Warriors from Auchmuty high school in 1999. He was one of the original intake of 36 professional players who were signed by the SRU, and he played for Edinburgh Rugby from 1996.

At amateur level, Burns played for Boroughmuir RFC, Biggar RFC and Watsonians

At international level Burns played for Scotland 7s and also played for the Scotland A and Scotland Under 21 side. He played for the Barbarians when they entered a 7s side into the famous Melrose Sevens tournament. He also played for a combined Scottish Districts team against Australia.

He coached Biggar RFC and Queensfery RFC.

Burns is now a Student and Adult Participation Manager for the Scottish Rugby Union. Of his role he stated: "At Scottish Rugby we are committed to sustaining and enhancing the numbers playing the game, particularly at that crucial period when boys and girls leave school and, either go into further education, or the world of work."
