= Glenn Metcalfe =

Scotland international rugby union player

- Born: Glenn Hayden Metcalfe; 15 April 1970 (age 56) Auckland, New Zealand
- Height: 5 ft 11 in (1.80 m)
- Weight: 195 lb (88 kg)

Rugby union career
- Position: Full Back
Amateur team(s)
Years	Team	Apps	(Points)
- Glasgow Academicals
–	Glasgow Hawks		
Senior career
Years	Team	Apps	(Points)
1996-2004	Glasgow Warriors	110	(125)
2004-05	Castres	14	(10)
International career
Years	Team	Apps	(Points)
1998-2003	Scotland	40	(20)

Glenn Hayden Metcalfe (born 15 April 1970 in Auckland) is a former rugby union footballer who played at fullback for Glasgow Warriors, Castres and Scotland.

== Rugby Union career ==
=== Amateur career ===
Metcalfe started his Scottish amateur club career with Glasgow Academicals but progressed in season 1997/98 with the then newly formed Glasgow Hawks who were unbeatable as they romped to the Second Division title as well as the Scottish Cup. While some players could beat him for outright pace, Metcalfe's jinky, unpredictable running made him extremely difficult to defend against. His strong defensive skills and accurate goalkicking combined to make him arguably the outstanding player in Scottish club rugby that season, outshining even many established international players in the First Division. Metcalfe was recently voted Glasgow Hawks' Player of the Decade.

=== Professional career ===
Metcalfe played for the professional provincial Glasgow Warriors as Glasgow Rugby - from 1996 onwards, from the first season the district side started its professional era, to 2004. Named on the wing for Warriors first match as a professional team - against Newbridge in the European Challenge Cup - Metcalfe has the distinction of being given Glasgow Warrior No. 11 for the provincial side.

A stalwart for those 8 seasons, he played in 110 competitive matches for the club, including the Scottish Inter-District Championship, Welsh-Scottish League, Pro12, European Rugby Challenge Cup and European Rugby Champions Cup matches.

=== International career ===
Metcalfe became eligible due to his Scottish-born grandmother, and he was a key member of the Scottish national squad that won the final Five Nations Championship in 1999, playing in all four matches. Other memorable moments in his Scotland career were his famous try-saving tackles on Aisea Tuilevu and Ifereimi Rawaqa in the 2003 World Cup against Fiji, which enabled Scotland to go through to the quarterfinals. Since retiring from rugby, Metcalfe has returned to live in New Zealand, the land of his birth.
