= Craig Chalmers =

British Lions & Scotland international rugby union player

- Born: Craig Minto Chalmers; 15 October 1968 (age 58) Galashiels, Scotland
- Height: 5 ft 11 in (1.80 m)
- Weight: 14 st 7 lb (92 kg)
- School: Earlston High School

Rugby union career
- Position: Fly-half
Amateur team(s)
Years	Team	Apps	(Points)
1987-98	Melrose		
2003-4	Birmingham & Solihull Bees		
2004-5	Melrose		
Senior career
Years	Team	Apps	(Points)
1996-1998	Border Reivers	7	(8)
1998-1999	Edinburgh Rugby	6	(54)
1999-2000	Glasgow Warriors	6	(25)
2000-2001	Harlequins	8	(6)
2001-2003	Worcester Warriors		
Provincial / State sides
Years	Team	Apps	(Points)
1988-1995	The South		
International career
Years	Team	Apps	(Points)
1988–89	Scotland 'B'	2	
1989–99	Scotland	60	(166)
1989	British Lions	1	(6)
Coaching career
- Years: Team
- 2004-2013: Melrose
- 2013-2013: Chinnor RFC
- 2013-: Esher RFC

Craig Minto Chalmers (born 15 October 1968) is a Scottish former rugby union player and coach. He represented Scotland and the British Lions at international level. He made 60 international appearances for Scotland team and scored 166 points. He played at fly-half with his playing career beginning at Melrose in the amateur era and with the professional era seeing him play Border Reivers and Glasgow Warriors before moving on to English sides Harlequins, Worcester Warriors and Pertemp Bees. He had coaching roles with Melrose and the Scotland national under-20 rugby union team. He has later had a business career in security.

== Rugby union career ==
=== Early amateur career ===
Chalmers played rugby while at Earlston High School. He was selected at stand-off for Scottish Schools against Australia in December 1985.

Chalmers played for Melrose and won the Scottish Cup with them in 1997.

=== Provincial and professional career ===
Chalmers played for South of Scotland District.

When the South District turned professional as the Border Reivers, he then played for them. That team disbanded in 1998 and he moved to Edinburgh Rugby for a season, before moving to Glasgow Warriors for another season.

In November 2000, Chalmers had not been included in Glasgow's European Cup squad and requested to go to Zurich Premiership side Harlequins on loan. In January 2001, Harlequins announced that they had extended the loan period for Chalmers until the end of the season. By early April, he was clear that he did not wish to return to Glasgow. Chalmers scored all his side's points in the semi-final of the 2000–01 European Challenge Cup and was man of the match, with Harlequins eventually winning the competition. In June 2001 he had signed to Worcester Warriors.

=== Part-time playing contract ===
In 2003, Chalmers turned down an approach from Melrose and instead signed a part-time contract to play for the Birmingham side Pertemp Bees that competed in the National Division One league.

=== International career ===
Chalmers was capped by Scotland 'B' twice in the period 1988–89.

He was not selected in Scotland's squad for the 1999 Rugby World Cup. He was capped 60 times for Scotland, 56 times in his preferred position of fly-half, but on occasion at centre and once as a substitute on the right wing. He was noted for his tactical kicking, support play, game management, & tackling which was something that fly halves of his time were not noted for.

His call up to the British Lions came just four months after his international debut. He went on the 1989 British Lions tour to Australia and played in the first test. Although he scored some points from kicks, the Lions lost that match. In March 1993 he sustained a broken arm playing for Scotland against England at Twickenham, so was out of the running for the 1993 British Lions tour to New Zealand.

He played in 13 matches for the Barbarians, between 1989 and 2001.

=== Coaching career ===
At Worcester, Chalmers had some involvement in coaching the academy players. In May 2003, Chalmers was announced as returning to Melrose as first team coach, although his Worcester contract ran until the end of June. On returning to Melrose, he continued in a playing role initially, retiring as a player in March 2005 having made a total of 200 appearances for the club.

Chalmers also took up other coaching opportunities alongside his Melrose position. In October 2008, he and Tom Smith were announced as coaches for the Scotland national under-20 rugby union team. In 2010 he also was named as coached for the Barbarians in their annual game against Bedford Blues.

By 2011 Melrose had won the championship title for the first time in 14 years, been in cup final for four successive years, and Melrose won the SRU's award for Club of the Season award. In April 2013 he confirmed that he would leave Melrose at the end of the season.

Chalmers had joined Chinnor RFC in Oxford, before then announcing in August 2013 that he was to join London club Esher RFC.

== Business career ==
Chalmers was a marketing manager for Scottish Power from 1988 to 1996, before turning professional when rugby union went professional in Scotland.

After finishing his playing career, Chalmers took up a job with a security company.

== Personal life ==
Chalmers's father Brian was a former Melrose player. In February 1997, Brian collapsed and died while watching Chalmers play for Melrose against local rivals Hawick. Chalmers was unaware of this happening, only being taken aside and given this news as the match finished.

Chalmers's sister Paula Chalmers played for the Scottish Women's rugby team and achieved an even higher number of caps.
