= Ian McInroy =

Scottish rugby union player

- Born: Ian McInroy; 20 January 1979 (age 47) Irvine, Scotland
- Height: 1.80 m (5 ft 11 in)
- Weight: 88 kg (13 st 12 lb)

Rugby union career
- Position: Centre
Amateur team(s)
Years	Team	Apps	(Points)
- Garnock RFC
- West of Scotland
- Glasgow Hawks
2003	Cambridge University		
Senior career
Years	Team	Apps	(Points)
1999-2003	Glasgow Warriors	24	(5)
2003-2011	London Scottish		
International career
Years	Team	Apps	(Points)
- Scotland U21
National sevens team
Years	Team		Comps
- Scotland

Ian McInroy (born 20 January 1979 in Irvine, Scotland) is a former Scottish Sevens international professional rugby union player, and a former Glasgow Warriors player. He played Centre but could also cover Wing or Full Back.

The Centre started at Garnock RFC before moving on to West of Scotland.

McInroy signed for Glasgow Warriors in 1999. When not playing for the Warriors, McInroy played for Glasgow Hawks.

He also played for the Scotland Sevens and captained the Under 21 side.

McInroy took a work experience role at Argyll Investments in Edinburgh and began a Bachelor of Science degree in Economics in 2003 at Cambridge. He played for Cambridge University rugby team.

He also played for London Scottish.
