= Rob Wainwright (rugby union) =

British Lions & Scotland international rugby union player

Rob Wainwright OBE
- Born: Robert Iain Wainwright; 22 March 1965 (age 61) Perth, Scotland
- Height: 1.93 m (6 ft 4 in)
- Weight: 100 kg (15 st 10 lb; 220 lb)
- School: Glenalmond College
- University: Magdalene College, Cambridge
- Occupation: Medical Doctor

Rugby union career
- Position(s): Flanker, No. 8
Amateur team(s)
Years	Team	Apps	(Points)
- Cambridge University R.U.F.C.
–	Dundee HSFP		
Senior career
Years	Team	Apps	(Points)
- London Scottish F.C.
- Caledonia Reds
1998–99	Glasgow Warriors	9	(5)
–	West Hartlepool R.F.C.		
–	Army Rugby Union		
Provincial / State sides
Years	Team	Apps	(Points)
- North and Midlands
International career
Years	Team	Apps	(Points)
1992–1998	Scotland	37	(14)
1997	British Lions	1	

Robert Iain Wainwright OBE (born 22 March 1965) is a former rugby union footballer who was capped 37 times for Scotland (Captain 16 times) and once for the British and Irish Lions. He played flanker.

== Early life ==
Wainwright was born in Perth, Scotland, the only son of five children. He was educated at Glenalmond College, where his father Jim was a long-serving geography teacher and former Warden (Headmaster), and read medicine at Magdalene College, Cambridge, on an Army bursary. While at Cambridge he earned full blues in rugby and boxing.

== Rugby career ==
Wainwright received his first cap in 1992, as a reserve against Ireland. He could play all back row positions, including flanker and number 8. Wainwright came to prominence in the 1994 Five Nations Championship with a try against England, and also scored a try against France in the final pool match of the 1995 Rugby World Cup. He became Scotland's first professional Captain following the retirement of Gavin Hastings after the Rugby World Cup in 1995, and led Scotland to a surprise second place behind England in the 1996 Five Nations Championship.

Richard Bath wrote of him that his

"quiet and urbane manner belies a steely resolve that led Jim Telfer to eventually appoint the utility back-row man as skipper after Gavin Hastings' retirement in 1995... he was forced to wait until the famous back row of Jeffrey, Calder and White called it a day after the 1991 World Cup before he could force his way into the Scottish squad... An unshowy player who does so much of the unseen work, Wainwright is a useful tail of the line jumper and a consistently good tackler."

When Wainwright was injured in 1996, Gregor Townsend took on the position of national captain.

Wainwright returned to captain the side in January 1997.

== Army career ==
A doctor by profession, Wainwright was commissioned into the Royal Army Medical Corps in 1987 and was promoted to Lieutenant in 1990, Captain on the completion of his medical training in 1991 and Major in 1996. He continued to be employed by the Army while also playing semi-professionally. As the 1997 Five Nations Championship approached, Wainright anticipated that he might be deployed to Bosnia with NATO peacekeeping troops but this did not occur. He retired in 1999.

== Personal life ==
Wainwright married Romayne in 1992. They have four children: Douglas, Natasha, Alexander, Cameron.

After ending his rugby career, Wainwright had planned to return to a career in medicine. In 1999 he and his family moved to the island of Coll in the Inner Hebrides, taking ownership of a farm.

He was appointed Officer of the Order of the British Empire (OBE) in the 2024 New Year Honours for voluntary and charitable services to the My Name'5 Doddie Foundation.
