= Martin Waite =

Scottish rugby union player

- Born: Martin Waite; 17 April 1971 (age 55)
- Height: 6 ft 3 in (1.91 m)

Rugby union career
- Position: Flanker
Amateur team(s)
Years	Team	Apps	(Points)
- Watsonians RFC
Senior career
Years	Team	Apps	(Points)
1996-98	Caledonia Reds	29	(30)
1998-2001	Glasgow Warriors		
Provincial / State sides
Years	Team	Apps	(Points)
- North and Midlands
International career
Years	Team	Apps	(Points)
- Scotland A
National sevens team
Years	Team		Comps
- Scotland 7s

Martin Waite (born 17 April 1971 in Scotland) is a Scottish former Scotland A international rugby union player who played for Glasgow Warriors and Caledonia Reds at the Flanker position.

Waite began his professional career with Caledonia Reds in 1996 before they merged with the Glasgow side in 1998. Waite then joined Glasgow Caledonians, now Glasgow Warriors for the next three seasons.

He played for amateur side Watsonians RFC, joining them from the professional Glasgow club for the new season 2001–02. Nevertheless, he remained included in the Glasgow side's Heineken Cup squad of 2001-02 while still a Watsonian player.

Waite retired from rugby union in 2002 after a back injury. He became a chartered surveyor in Edinburgh with Barr Brady.

On Waite's retiral from the game, Scott Hastings, then the Director of Rugby at Watsonians, stated that Waite's enforced retirement was a: "loss of one of Scottish rugby’s characters. [Waite] was capable of the improbable. He’d try an audacious reverse pass. Sometimes it worked, sometimes it didn’t...That’s why he stood out."

Waite played at international level for Scotland A and the Scotland Sevens.
