= Jon Petrie =

Scotland international rugby union player

Jonny Petrie
- Born: Jon Petrie; 19 October 1976 (age 50) Dundee, Scotland
- Height: 1.93 m (6 ft 4 in)
- Weight: 109 kg (17 st 2 lb)
- Notable relative: Murray Petrie Jen Petrie Simon Petrie Richard Petrie Finn Petrie Harvey Petrie William Petrie Olivia Petrie

Rugby union career
- Position: Flanker
Senior career
Years	Team	Apps	(Points)
1998–2007	Glasgow Warriors	155	(60)
- Correct as of 18 December 2012
International career
Years	Team	Apps	(Points)
2000–2007	Scotland	45	(15)
- Correct as of 18 December 2012

Jonathan Michael Petrie (born 19 October 1976) is a Scottish rugby union executive and former player. During his active career he played at flanker for Glasgow Warriors and Scotland.

Petrie had two seasons in Scotland's under-21 team, making his debut against the Irish in 1997 while he was playing in France with Colomiers. Petrie's Scotland A debut was in the 99–0 win over the Netherlands at Murrayfield in December 1999. He won his first cap in the second test on the tour of New Zealand in 2000, his first try for Scotland came in 31–8 November 2000 win against Samoa. He was given the captaincy by then Scotland coach Frank Hadden in 2005 leading Scotland to their first ever victory against the Barbarians.

Petrie was Club Captain of Glasgow Warriors from 2004 to 2006.

Jon Petrie was denied his first Test series as captain by injury ahead of the matches against Argentina, Samoa and New Zealand in November 2005.

His later career was blighted by injury and he was eventually replaced as captain by Jason White.

Jon Petrie announced his retirement as a player from Rugby Union in March 2007.

On 16 July 2015 it was announced that he would take over as managing director of Edinburgh Rugby.

Since January 2019 he is Chief Executive of Ulster Rugby.
