= Shaun Longstaff =

Scotland international rugby union player (born 1972)

- Born: Shaun Longstaff; 3 January 1972 (age 54) Wellington, New Zealand
- Height: 6 ft 1 in (1.85 m)
- Weight: 95 kg (14 st 13 lb)
- University: Dundee University, Scotland

Rugby union career
- Position: Wing
Senior career
Years	Team	Apps	(Points)
1996-1998	Caledonia Reds		
1998-2001	Glasgow Warriors	38	(90)
International career
Years	Team	Apps	(Points)
1998-2000	Scotland	15	(10)

Shaun Longstaff (born 3 January 1972) is a former rugby union footballer who played on the wing for Scotland. He later became an international rugby agent.
