= Andy Nicol =

Scotland international rugby union player

- Born: Andrew Douglas Nicol; 12 March 1971 (age 55) Dundee, Scotland
- Height: 5 ft 11 in (1.80 m)

Rugby union career
- Position: Scrum-half
Amateur team(s)
Years	Team	Apps	(Points)
1990–1999	Dundee HSFP		
Senior career
Years	Team	Apps	(Points)
1997–1999	Bath		
1999–2003	Glasgow Warriors	66	(37)
Provincial / State sides
Years	Team	Apps	(Points)
- North and Midlands
International career
Years	Team	Apps	(Points)
1991	Scotland 'B'	2	(0)
1992–2002	Scotland	23	(9)

Andrew Douglas Nicol (born 12 March 1971) is a former Scotland international rugby union player. A scrum-half, Nicol won 23 caps for Scotland and had brief spells as a replacement on two British Lions tours.

== Rugby union career ==
Nicol was born on 12 March 1971 in Dundee and educated at the High School of Dundee and Dundee Institute of Technology (now Abertay University). He played for Dundee HSFP and for North and Midlands.

When the game turned professional Nicol played for Bath. As captain of Bath, he was the first British player to lift the Heineken Cup, when they defeated Brive in 1998.

In 1999 Nicol moved from Bath to Glasgow Warriors. He made his competitive debut for the Glasgow provincial side on 3 September 1999, playing an away match against Pontypridd in the Welsh-Scottish League. He became Glasgow Warrior No. 65.

Nicol retired at the end of the 2002–03 season,

=== International career ===
Nicol played for Scotland 'B' against France 'B' on 2 March 1991; he played for the 'B' side again against Ireland 'B' on 28 December 1991.

Nicol made his debut for Scotland in 1992 against England. Over 10 years he won 23 caps for Scotland, a period when he faced strong competition for selection from scrum halves Gary Armstrong and Bryan Redpath. He never played in a World Cup, not being selected in 1991 and 1999, and being injured in 1995.

Nicol captained Scotland in 2000 when Scotland beat England 19–13 at a rain-soaked Murrayfield and so prevented England from achieving the Grand Slam.

Nicol was a replacement on the 1993 British Lions tour to New Zealand, when he appeared in one game, playing six minutes. He was also called up as a late replacement for the Lions on their 2001 tour, replacing Austin Healey, whilst on holiday in Australia. In total he spent seven days with the Lions across two tours.

== Other interests ==
On 16 February 2007, Nicol was defeated in the Rectorial election at the University of Dundee. Former British Ambassador Craig Murray was duly elected Lord Rector with 632 votes to Nicol's 582. He was awarded an honorary degree by Abertay University in 2013.

Nicol is a commentator for BBC Sport.
