= Gordon Simpson (rugby union) =

Scotland international rugby union player

- Full name: Gordon Leslie Simpson
- Born: 21 September 1971 (age 55) Takapuna, New Zealand
- Height: 1.85 m (6 ft 1 in)
- Weight: 110 kg (17 st 5 lb; 243 lb)
- School: Rosmini College

Rugby union career
- Position(s): blindside flanker, openside flanker, number eight
Youth career
- -: East Coast Bays Rugby Football Club
- –: North Shore Rugby Football Club
Amateur team(s)
Years	Team	Apps	(Points)
–	New Zealand Secondary Schools		
–	North Shore Premiers		
–	New Zealand U19s		
–	New Zealand U21s		
1998	Kirkcaldy	5	(10)
Senior career
Years	Team	Apps	(Points)
–	North Harbour		
–	Wellington Lions		
–	Hurricanes		
–	Caledonia Reds		
1998-2003	Glasgow Warriors	95	(175)
–	North Harbour		
International career
Years	Team	Apps	(Points)
1998−2002	Scotland	15	(15)

Gordon Leslie Simpson (born 21 September 1971) is a New Zealand-born rugby union player who played as a loose forward, formerly for Glasgow Caledonians and also representing Scotland. He was known by the nickname "badger" because of his ability to win the ball close to the ground.

== New Zealand domestic career ==
He began his domestic career in his place of birth, Auckland, New Zealand and began playing there for the North Harbour National Provincial Championship team. Simpson then moved to the Wellington side, the Wellington Lions, in the same competition, while also playing for the Hurricanes in Super Rugby.

Following his International career, Gordon returned to the North Harbour team, captaining it on a few occasions, one of which being the side's first ever game at its current stadium, North Harbour Stadium. He then retired from first-class rugby, returning to North Harbour's premier grade, having played in the grade more than a decade beforehand.

== Scotland domestic career ==
Moving to Scotland in 1998 he initially played for Kirkcaldy RFC, briefly for Caledonia Reds, then for Glasgow Caledonians (now Glasgow Warriors).

== International career ==
He qualified to play for Scotland through his maternal grandfather, who was born in the Knightswood area of Glasgow. He made his debut against Australia in Sydney on 13 June 1998. He played in four matches at the World Cup in 1999.

He was recalled to the Scotland side in 2001, after a year where he had been injured. He played in the Six Nations 2000-2001 Championship.

He also represented New Zealand in NZ Secondary Schools, NZ U19 and NZ U21 age-grade levels.
