= Tommy Hayes (rugby union, born 1973) =

Cook Islands international rugby union player

- Born: Thomas Wayne Hayes; 13 December 1973 (age 52) Tokoroa, New Zealand
- Height: 6 ft 0 in (1.83 m)
- Weight: 200 lb (91 kg)

Rugby union career
- Position: Fly-half
Amateur team(s)
| Years | Team | Apps | (Points) |
- Waikato Rangers
| 1997-2003 | Glasgow Hawks | | |
| 2006-2007 | Moseley RFC | | |
| 2007 | Gran Parma | | |
| 2007-2008 | Moseley RFC | | |
| 2009-2010 | Coventry RFC | | |
| 2010-2012 | Malvern RFC | | |
| 2012- | Pershore RFC | | |
Senior career
| Years | Team | Apps | (Points) |
| 1997-2003 | Glasgow | 115 | (1165) |
| 2003-05 | Worcester | 15 | (75) |
| 2005-06 | Bristol | 6 | (19) |
Provincial / State sides
| Years | Team | Apps | (Points) |
| 1997 | Waikato | | |
International career
| Years | Team | Apps | (Points) |
| - | Cook Islands | | |
Coaching career
- Years: Team
- 2009-10: Coventry RFC (Backs Coach)
- 2012–present: Pershore RFC

Tommy Hayes (born 13 December 1973 in Tokoroa, New Zealand) is a Cook Island international rugby union player. He plays as a fly-half.

== Rugby Union career ==
=== Amateur career ===
Hayes started off with amateur club Waikato Rangers in New Zealand.

As part of the Glasgow Warriors contract Hayes was allowed to play for the amateur side Glasgow Hawks when not on Warriors duty.

The former Cook Islands international joined amateur side Moseley RFC for the second half of the 2006/07 season. He returned to Moseley for the latter part of the 2007/08 season after a spell at Gran Parma in Italy.

He played with Coventry RFC (2009/2010), and Malvern RFC (2010/2012). Hayes now plays at Pershore RFC. Hayes cited that his greatest achievement and proudest moment in his rugby career was winning the North Midlands Vase in 2023.

=== Provincial and professional career ===
Hayes quickly progressed from amateur to playing for Waikato Province.

The professional Glasgow side signed Hayes in 1997.

He went on to play 121 times for the professional Glasgow side and was the first player to reach 1,000 points for Glasgow Warriors and was described by the Welsh Rugby Union as the equal of any goal-kicker in Europe. The 121 caps total includes friendly matches; for competitive matches his total is 115 caps amassing 1165 points.

Tommy Hayes holds the club record for most individual points scored in a game for Glasgow Warriors: 32 points in a match, scored against Cardiff Blues at Hughenden on 4 November 2001. In addition, he is the club's second highest points scorer (1,165 points) for Glasgow Warriors.

From Glasgow, Hayes moved to Worcester Warriors in 2003, (where he was said to have "masterminded Worcester's rise out of Division 1") then moved to Bristol in 2005, but was released by them in November 2006.

=== International career ===
Part of a sizeable Cook Islands population in New Zealand, Hayes qualified for Cook Islands representation through his mother. He was capped twice by Cook Islands coming to the attention of Glasgow Rugby, now Glasgow Warriors.

The caps Hayes had earned for Cook Islands were to cause him later consternation as Hayes was eager to represent Scotland through residency. Despite unable to play for Scotland, Hayes considers himself an honorary Scot after spending six seasons with Glasgow.

=== Coaching career ===
Hayes spent a season as backs coach (and a player) with Coventry RFC (2009/2010), Tommy now coaches at Pershore RFC.
