= Welsh–Scottish League =

Rugby Union league

- Sport: Rugby union
- Instituted: 1999; 27 years ago
- Number of teams: 11–12
- Nations: Scotland; Wales
- Most titles: (Wales) Cardiff (1 title) (Wales) Swansea (1 title) (Wales) Llanelli (1 title)
- Relegation to: (Wales) WRU Championship (except 2001–02 season)

The Welsh–Scottish League was a rugby union league in Scotland and Wales jointly implemented by the Scottish Rugby Union and the Welsh Rugby Union from the 1999–2000 season onwards. It was a precursor to the Celtic League and lasted three seasons, being disbanded after the Celtic League was set up.

== History ==
=== Impact of Professionalism in Rugby Union ===
When World Rugby decreed an Open Game for Rugby Union in 1995, the Northern Hemisphere nations reacted with varying degrees of speed and enthusiasm to the new professional game.

Wales and the Welsh Rugby Union largely continued as was. They entered teams into the 1995–96 season's European Rugby Champions Cup, the Heineken Cup; alongside teams from Ireland, Italy, Romania and France.

Scotland and the Scottish Rugby Union, however, largely was stunned by the announcement. Scotland did not enter any teams into the 1995–96 season's Heineken Cup.

=== Club versus District debate ===
While Wales continued with the club model and attempted to professionalise their amateur clubs to compete in Europe, in Scotland the debate reached fever pitch.

Scotland had the oldest Districts in rugby union. The Glasgow/Edinburgh provincial derby was the oldest Inter-District derby in the world. Glasgow District and Edinburgh District were founded in 1872. (Hence Glasgow Warriors and Edinburgh Rugby play for the 1872 Cup to commemorate this.) The other districts North and Midlands and South were formed later, and they all played in the Scottish Inter-District Championship from 1953 onwards.

Unlike Ireland, whose provincial teams Leinster, Connacht, Munster and Ulster were members of the IRFU and had their own grounds; in Scotland the districts were not members of the Scottish Rugby Union and played in various club grounds in their districts. This meant that Ireland quickly embraced their districts on professionalism. In Scotland this debate had to be completed; and the members of the Scottish Rugby Union would decide on the way forward. The clubs were the members.

The SRU favoured a professional District model and put it to the clubs in an EGM in early 1996. There was significant opposition, notably from Gavin Hastings and Keith Robertson, but the professionalisation of Scotland's districts was approved. The four amateur districts became the professional District teams Glasgow Warriors, Edinburgh Rugby, Caledonia Reds and the Border Reivers.

=== European woes ===
Welsh rugby was struggling with the professionalism of their club sides. Some felt there were too many clubs and not enough money to go round to make them competitive. The argument began to be made for regional sides.

In Scotland, the situation was much worse. A lot of the top amateur clubs were against the professional districts from the start, believing that they should be entered into the Heineken Cup instead. A 'Gang of Four' – ex-Scottish internationalists Jim Aitken, Finlay Calder, David Sole and Gavin Hastings – went around Scotland drumming up support for a professional Club model to be used instead.

This did nothing to help the fledgling professional District sides. They had poor results in European competition and attendances suffered. Eventually after two years the Scottish Rugby Union cut the four districts to two, merging Edinburgh and the Borders; and Glasgow and Caledonia in 1998.

The Scottish Inter-District Championship had been an already limited tournament; with only four professional sides, and only three matches played by each team each season. Now with only two districts remaining – although the three match format was kept as a best of three – the SRU realised that Glasgow Warriors and Edinburgh Rugby needed more competition than each other to be competitive in European competition.

=== Moves toward a Celtic League ===
The pruning of the District model gave an impetus to those favouring the Club model. David Sole stated: "This proves yet again that to put the focus on districts was an ill-conceived and ill-planned idea which wasn't thought through" Although the two districts were now bigger, the subsequent lack of progression for players, the morale sapping of losing half the Scottish professional base and the continued ill-feeling from the clubs hampered Glasgow and Edinburgh progress for years to come.

Something had to be done. The SRU favoured a Celtic League model with Ireland, Wales and Scotland in a league.

Meanwhile, in Wales, moves were afoot to try and create an Anglo-Welsh League. The English Rugby Union offered the Welsh Rugby Union a place for around 4 or 5 Welsh teams in the English leagues. This was flatly rejected by the Welsh boss Graham Henry as an insult. He stated: "It was right to reject this paltry offer. What was proposed wasn't British, just a few Welsh clubs in a predominantly English league which would have been no good to anyone".

The Irish were against joining any kind of British and Irish league. However the SRU engendered good relations with the IRFU and organised friendlies for Glasgow and Edinburgh to play against the Irish provinces.

The SRU had even better luck with the WRU. The WRU organised a Challenge Cup with invited sides playing against Welsh opposition. This was gerrymandered so that the invited sides only played the Welsh teams and not one another but it was an opportunity that the SRU could not afford to turn down and both Glasgow and Edinburgh claimed their place in the tournament.

=== The WRU Challenge Cup ===
Both Glasgow Caledonians and Edinburgh Reivers were invited into the WRU's Challenge Cup; along with the South African provincial sides Northern Bulls and Gauteng Falcons and the Romania national side (in Glasgow's pool) and Natal, the Canada national side and the Georgia national side (in Edinburgh's pool).

The WRU constructed that year's tournament so that eight Welsh teams are placed in two pools; four in each pool. The four Welsh sides in each pool then played the invited sides of that pool. The winners of each pool play a final; and the pool runners-up played a third place play-off. Hence Glasgow (and Edinburgh and other invited sides) only played Welsh opposition in their pools.

Depending on results, the invited sides then would only play each other if they qualified out of their pools. Going into their last matches both Glasgow and Edinburgh had a chance to secure their pool runners up place. This would have meant a Glasgow/Edinburgh play-off in Wales! However Glasgow fell at the last hurdle. Although Edinburgh won their pool runners up spot they then pulled out of the 3rd place play-off against Bridgend due to their players' exhaustion.

Despite the exhaustion of the Scottish players and the fact that they played a number of matches in several days due to postponements the WRU Challenge Cup was deemed a success. This paved the way for the formation of the Welsh–Scottish League.

== Formation of the Welsh–Scottish League ==
Cardiff RFC and Swansea RFC were already thinking of joining the English leagues. They had pulled out of the Welsh Premier Division and were playing friendlies against English sides in an attempt to curry favour with the English Rugby Union.

However they were still involved in the Welsh Cup competition. When Cardiff was trounced by Llanelli RFC in the semi-final it brought a reality check to the two want-away clubs. Gareth Davies, Cardiff's chief executive, described the 39–10 defeat as: "The worst performance by a Cardiff side I have ever seen... a very unprofessional display, ill-disciplined and with a low skill level."

The SRU's overtures to the WRU about a Welsh–Scottish League came at exactly the right time to everyone concerned. The WRU could have a new league; Cardiff and Swansea could come back into the fold without losing face; and Glasgow Caledonians and Edinburgh Reivers could finally have opposition they needed.

The Welsh–Scottish League began in season 1999–00.

== End of the Welsh–Scottish League ==
With the start of the Celtic League in 2001–02, it was felt that there was no longer space for the fixtures of the Welsh–Scottish League. The 2001–02 final year's Welsh–Scottish League included jointly held fixtures in an attempt to remedy this.

The Celtic League proved an instant success. The SRU was confident enough to revive one of its disbanded districts and chose the Border Reivers; the traditional powerhouse of Scottish rugby. With a third Scottish district, expansion of the Welsh–Scottish League seemed even more unlikely.

"There was a strong feeling from both the SRU and WRU that 22 league fixtures represented an unacceptably high figure, when combined with the other demands on top players next season," said a joint statement by the SRU and the WRU.

Secretary of the Welsh Rugby Union Dennis Gethin said "A fully fledged Celtic League is of paramount importance and we are working towards achieving that goal. To avoid overplaying our top players and for administrative reasons, the forthcoming 2003 World Cup will delay its implementation. However we are confident that as soon as it is practicable, we will have in place a cross border competition of which we can be proud and which will enhance playing standards. We thank the Scots for three excellent seasons of competitive club rugby".

SRU Director of Rugby Jim Telfer said " When you consider that our top players will play 11 internationals next season and a minimum of seven Celtic League games and a minimum of six Heineken Cup matches, plus our own provincial competition, them we will be already around the optimum 30 games. We have to guard against player burn-out and that becomes an even more important issue as the 2003 Rugby world Cup looms"

== Legacy of the Welsh–Scottish League ==
The Welsh–Scottish League proved that a joint league between similar sized rugby union nations can be very successful. It was a successful model in co-operation between two distinct rugby unions. Without the success of the league it would be doubtful if the Irish Rugby Union would have entered a Celtic League or the Pro12 (now the United Rugby Championship) formed with the addition of the Italian Rugby Federation.

Despite favourable results in the Welsh–Scottish League and the subsequent formation of the Celtic League – many in Wales were convinced that a District model similar to that of Scotland and Ireland was the way forward for professionalism in Wales. The regional model was followed for season 2003–04.
