= 2000–01 Glasgow Warriors season =

Glasgow Warriors 2000 / 2001
- Ground: Hughenden Stadium (Capacity: 6,000)
- Coach: (Scotland) Richie Dixon
- Captain: (Scotland) Andy Nicol
- Most caps: (Scotland) Jon Petrie (Scotland) Gordon McIlwham (28)
- Top scorer: (Cook Islands) Tommy Hayes (233)
- Most tries: (Scotland) Gordon Simpson (8)
- League: 2000–01 Welsh-Scottish League
- 7th
Team kit

The 2000–01 season is the fifth in the history of the Glasgow Warriors as a professional side. During this season the young professional side competed as Glasgow Caledonians; the last time they would use that name.

The 2000–01 season saw Glasgow Caledonians compete in the competitions: the Welsh-Scottish League and the European Champions Cup, the Heineken Cup for sponsorship reasons.

== Team ==
=== Coaches ===
- Head coach: (Scotland) Richie Dixon
- Assistant coach: (Scotland) Rob Moffat
- Assistant coach: (New Zealand) Gordon Macpherson

=== Squad ===
Hookers (Scotland) Gordon Bulloch (Scotland) Carlo di Ciacca (Scotland) Chris Docherty (Scotland) Dougie Hall (Scotland) Gavin Scott Props (Scotland) Willie Anderson (Scotland) Lee Harrison (Scotland) Dave Hilton (Scotland) Gordon McIlwham (Scotland) Euan Murray (Scotland) Alan Watt (Scotland) Andrew Welsh Locks (Scotland) Darren Burns (Scotland) Stewart Campbell (Scotland) Steve Griffiths (Scotland) Scott Hutton (Scotland) Guy Perrett (Scotland) Colin Stewart (Scotland) Jason White	Loose forwards (Scotland) Gareth Flockhart (Scotland) Donnie Macfadyen (Scotland) Jon Petrie (Scotland) Roland Reid (Scotland) Gordon Simpson (Scotland) Martin Waite Half backs (Scotland) Graeme Beveridge (Scotland) Chris Black (Scotland) Andy Nicol (Scotland) Kenny Sinclair (Scotland) Fraser Stott (New Zealand) Graeme Young Stand offs (Scotland) Craig Chalmers (Cook Islands) Tommy Hayes (Scotland) Barry Irving (Scotland) Mark McKenzie	Centres (Scotland) Alan Bulloch (Scotland) Andrew Henderson (Scotland) Ian Jardine (Scotland) Matt McGrandles (Scotland) Ian McInroy (Scotland) James McLaren (Scotland) Jonathan Stuart Back Three (New Zealand) Michael Bartlett (Scotland) James Craig (Scotland) Rory Kerr (Scotland) Graeme Kiddie (Scotland) Shaun Longstaff (Scotland) Glenn Metcalfe (Scotland) Craig Sangster (Scotland) Rowen Shepherd (Scotland) Jon Steel

=== Academy players ===
Glasgow once again sent a group of youngsters to study rugby in New Zealand for the summer of 2001.

The Glasgow Thistles squad for the coming year:

P Burke, A Reid, A McKay (all Ayr), M Gallacher, F Hamilton, S Martin, J Nellany (all High School of Glasgow), G Hutton, C Miller (both Glasgow Academy), S Forrest, G Lindsay, S Male (all Cambuslang), D Mitchell (Hillhead/Jordanhill), D Monaghan, P Nicol (both Whitecraigs), D Naismith, S Rushforth (both Kelvinside Academy), S Ross (Helensburgh), S Smith (Glasgow Hawks), Alasdair Strokosch (East Kilbride), K Weir (Glasgow Academicals), G White (Stewartry).

== Player statistics ==
During the 2000–01 season, Glasgow have used 44 different players in competitive games. The table below shows the number of appearances and points scored by each player.

Position	Nation	Name	Welsh-Scottish League			Heineken Cup			Total	
Position	Nation	Name	Apps (sub)	Tries	Points kicked	Apps (sub)	Tries	Points kicked	Apps (sub)	Total pts
HK	(Scotland)	Gordon Bulloch	22	2	0	4	0	0	26	10
HK	(Scotland)	Carlo di Ciacca	0	0	0	2	0	0	2	0
HK	(Scotland)	Chris Docherty	(1)	0	0	0	0	0	(1)	0
HK	(Scotland)	Gavin Scott	(4)	0	0	(1)	1	0	(5)	5
PR	(Scotland)	Lee Harrison	3(7)	1	0	0	0	0	3(7)	5
PR	(Scotland)	Dave Hilton	21	2	0	6	0	0	27	10
PR	(Scotland)	Gordon McIlwham	20(2)	1	0	6	0	0	26(2)	5
PR	(Scotland)	Euan Murray	0	0	0	(1)	0	0	(1)	0
PR	(Scotland)	Alan Watt	(4)	0	0	(3)	0	0	(7)	0
LK	(Scotland)	Darren Burns	(1)	0	0	(1)	0	0	(2)	0
LK	(Scotland)	Stewart Campbell	4(4)	0	0	4	0	0	8(4)	0
LK	(Scotland)	Steve Griffiths	14(3)	1	0	6	0	0	20(3)	5
LK	(Scotland)	Scott Hutton	(1)	0	0	0	0	0	(1)	0
LK	(Scotland)	Guy Perrett	3(1)	0	0	0	0	0	3(1)	0
LK	(Scotland)	Colin Stewart	11(2)	0	0	0	0	0	11(2)	0
LK	(Scotland)	Jason White	12	1	0	6	0	0	18	5
BR	(Scotland)	Gareth Flockhart	5(5)	0	0	0	0	0	5(5)	0
BR	(Scotland)	Donnie Macfadyen	11(3)	2	0	1	0	0	12(3)	10
BR	(Scotland)	Jon Petrie	22	3	0	6	0	0	28	15
BR	(Scotland)	Roland Reid	10(6)	6	0	1(3)	0	0	11(9)	30
BR	(Scotland)	Gordon Simpson	18(1)	5	0	5	3	0	23(1)	40
BR	(Scotland)	Martin Waite	(3)	1	0	1(3)	0	0	1(6)	5
SH	(Scotland)	Graeme Beveridge	7(1)	3	0	4	0	0	11(3)	15
SH	(Scotland)	Chris Black	2	0	0	0	0	0	2	0
SH	(Scotland)	Andy Nicol	9(1)	2	2	2(1)	0	0	11(2)	12
SH	(Scotland)	Kenny Sinclair	(1)	0	0	0	0	0	(1)	0
SH	(Scotland)	Fraser Stott	4(3)	3	0	0	0	0	4(3)	15
SH	(New Zealand)	Graeme Young	(1)	0	0	0	0	0	(1)	0
FH	(Scotland)	Craig Chalmers	2	0	14	0	0	0	2	14
FH	(Cook Islands)	Tommy Hayes	16(2)	4	138	5(1)	3	60	21(3)	233
FH	(Scotland)	Barry Irving	3(5)	3	15	0	0	0	3(5)	30
FH	(Scotland)	Mark McKenzie	5(2)	1	78	1	0	14	6(2)	97
CE	(Scotland)	Alan Bulloch	19(1)	3	0	4(2)	3	0	23(3)	30
CE	(Scotland)	Andrew Henderson	(2)	1	0	0	0	0	(2)	5
CE	(Scotland)	Ian Jardine	3(1)	2	0	3	0	0	6(1)	10
CE	(Scotland)	Ian McInroy	1(1)	0	0	0	0	0	1(1)	0
CE	(Scotland)	James McLaren	12(1)	6	3	3	0	0	15(1)	33
CE	(Scotland)	Jonathan Stuart	18(2)	6	0	2	0	0	20(2)	30
WG	(Scotland)	James Craig	13	2	0	1(2)	4	0	14(2)	10
WG	(Scotland)	Rory Kerr	7	4	0	0	0	0	7	20
WG	(Scotland)	Shaun Longstaff	5(4)	5	0	4(1)	1	0	9(5)	30
WG	(Scotland)	Jon Steel	13(1)	5	0	6	0	0	19(1)	25
FB	(Scotland)	Glenn Metcalfe	10(1)	3	0	2(1)	0	0	12(2)	15
FB	(Scotland)	Rowen Shepherd	5(2)	0	5	5	1	0	10(2)	10

== Staff movements ==
=== Coaches ===
==== Personnel in ====
None.

==== Personnel out ====
None.

== Player movements ==
=== Player transfers ===
==== In ====
- (Scotland) James McLaren from (France) CS Bourgoin
- (Scotland) Guy Perrett return from study sabbatical
- (Scotland) Graeme Kiddie from (Scotland) Boroughmuir
- (Scotland) Andrew Welsh from (Scotland) East Kilbride

==== Out ====
- (Scotland) Mark McKenzie to (France) Nice
- (Scotland) Alan Brown to (Scotland) Dundee HSFP

== Competitions ==
=== Pre-season and friendlies ===
==== Match 1 ====
5 August 2000

British Columbia; President's XV (Canada)	23 – 28	(Scotland) Glasgow Caledonians
Try: Dave Saklofsky; Pen: Mike Sengara x 6	Preview; Report; Report	Try: Martin Waite x 2 Jonathan Stuart; Darren Burns; Con: Craig Chalmers x 4

Wolfson Fields, University of British Columbia.

Glasgow Caledonians:15 Rowen Shepherd 14 James Craig 13 Jon Stuart 12 Ian Jardine 11 Ian McInroy 10 Craig Chalmers 9 Graeme Beveridge 1 David Hilton 2 Gavin Scott 3 Willie Anderson 4 Darren Burns 5 Steve Griffiths 6 Martin Waite 8 Jon Petrie 7 Gareth Flockhart Replacements: Craig Sangster Matt McGrandles Fraser Stott Roland Reid Alan Watt Gordon Bulloch Used: A Watt for Anderson 50. R Reid for Petrie 57. C Sangster for Shepherd 60. F Stott for Beveridge 66. C Stewart for Griffiths 66.

==== Match 2 ====
9 August 2000

US Pacific Coast Grizzlies (United States)	14 – 55	(Scotland) Glasgow Caledonians
Try: Dave Piedrahita; Pen: Tim Dymmel x 3	Preview; Report; Report; Report; Reaction	Try: Roland Reid x 3 Mark McKenzie; Rowen Shepherd x 2 James Craig; Fraser Stott; Ian McInroy; Con: Mark McKenzie x 5

Wolfson Fields, University of British Columbia.

Glasgow Caledonians:Craig Sangster; James Craig, Matt McGrandles, Rowen Shepherd (captain), Ian McInroy; Mark McKenzie, Fraser Stott; David Hilton, Gordon Bulloch, Lee Harrison, Colin Stewart, Steven Griffiths, Martin Waite, Roland Reid, Donnie Macfadyen. Replacements – Jon Stuart for James Craig (13 minutes), Alan Watt for Hilton (half-time), Darren Burns for Griffiths (54), Gavin Scott for Waite (56).

==== Match 3 ====
12 August 2000

British Columbia (Canada)	16 – 20	(Scotland) Glasgow Caledonians
Try: ? Pen: ?	Preview; Report	Try: Ian Jardine; Roland Reid; Mark McKenzie; Con: Mark McKenzie; Pen: Mark McKenzie

Wolfson Fields, University of British Columbia.

Glasgow Caledonians: R.Shepherd; J.Craig, J.Stuart, I.Jardine, I. McInroy; M.McKenzie, F.Stott; A.Watt, G.Scott, W.Anderson, D.Burns, C.Stewart (S.Griffiths 59), R.Reid, D.Macfadyen (G.Flockhart 54) J.Petrie. Replacements (not used): Matt McGrandles Craig Chalmers Graeme Beveridge David Hilton Gordon Bulloch

Winning all 3 matches on the Canadian tour won Glasgow Warriors the Coastal Cup.

==== Match 4 ====
15 August 2000

Northampton Saints (England)	30 – 34	(Scotland) Glasgow Caledonians
Try: : Lam; Allen; Bateman; Martin; Con: Grayson x 2 Pen: Grayson x 2	Preview; Preview; Preview; Report	Try: Roland Reid x 2 James Craig; Gareth Flockhart; Rowen Shepherd; Con: Craig Chalmers; Rowen Shepherd; Mark McKenzie; Drop: Mark McKenzie

Franklin Gardens
Referee: S Lander (Liverpool)

Northampton Saints: M Tucker; C Moir, A Bateman, M Allen, L Martin; P Grayson, D Malone; G Pagel, S Thompson, M Scelzo, T Rodber, O Brouzet, G Seely, B Pountney, P Lam. Substitutes used – M Stewart, S Brotherstone, J Phillips, R Hunter, A Rennick, J Bamhall, S Webster, I Vass, M Soden, T Kirk.
Glasgow Caledonians: T Hayes; J Craig, R Shepherd, I Jardine, S Longstaff; C Chalmers, G Beveridge; D Hilton, G Bulloch, G McIlwham, S Griffiths, J White, G Flockhart, D Macfadyen, J Petrie. Substitutes used – R Reid, M McKenzie, D Burns.

==== Match 5 ====
19 August 2000

Glasgow Caledonians (Scotland)	7 – 73	(Ireland) Munster
Try: Jon Petrie; Con: Mark McKenzie	Preview; Preview; Report	Try: Langford x 2 Stringer; John Kelly x 4 Foley x 2 Crotty; Prendegast; Con: O'Gara x 8 Holland

Bridgehaugh Park, Stirling
Referee: R Dickson (Madras FP)

Glasgow Caledonians:T Hayes; J Craig, R Shepherd (I Jardine 2–3), J Stuart, R Reid; M McKenzie, G Beveridge (F Stott 71); A Watt, G Scott (G Bulloch 54), W Anderson (G McIlwham 40), C Stewart (D Burns 40), J White, G Simpson (D Hilton 54–64), D Macfadyen (G Flockhart 17), J Petrie.
Munster: D Crotty; J O'Neill (P Bracken 56), J Kelly, J Holland, A Horgan; R O'Gara (Stringer 76), P Stringer (M Prendegast 72); M Horan (D O'Sullivan 56), F Sheahan, P Clohessy, M Galway, J Langford, A Quinlan, D Wallace (C McMahon 56), A Foley.

=== European Champions Cup ===
==== Pool 6 ====
Team	P	W	D	L	Tries for	Tries against	Try diff	Points for	Points against	Points diff	Pts
(England) Leicester	6	5	0	1	15	9	6	178	105	73	10
(France) Pau	6	4	0	2	19	10	9	154	142	12	8
(Wales) Pontypridd	6	2	0	4	9	12	−3	136	131	5	4
(Scotland) Glasgow Caledonians	6	1	0	5	12	24	−12	137	227	−90	2

==== Results ====
===== Round 1 =====
7 October 2000
14:30

Pontypridd (Wales)	40 – 25	(Scotland) Glasgow Caledonians
Try: Lenny Woodard; Lee Jarvis; Paul John; Brent Cockbain; Con: Lee Jarvis x 4 Pen: Lee Jarvis x 4	Preview; Report; Report; Report	Try: Alan Bulloch; Con: Tommy Hayes; Pen: Tommy Hayes x 6

Sardis Road
Attendance: 2,500
Referee: Ashley Rowden (England)

===== Round 2 =====
15 October 2000
15:00

Glasgow Caledonians (Scotland)	21 – 33	(England) Leicester Tigers
Try: Gordon Simpson; Gavin Scott; Con: Tommy Hayes; Pen: Tommy Hayes x 3	Preview; Report; Report; Report	Try: Tim Stimpson; Leon Lloyd; Neil Back; Con: Tim Stimpson x 3 Pen: Tim Stimpson x 4

Hughenden Stadium
Attendance: 3,500
Referee: Didier Mene (France)

===== Round 3 =====
22 October 2000
14:00

Glasgow Caledonians (Scotland)	24 – 46	(France) Pau
Try: Alan Bulloch; Gordon Simpson; Con: Mark McKenzie; Pen: Mark McKenzie x 4	Preview; Report; Report; Report	Try: David Arrieta; David Aucagne; Eric Gouloumet; Damien Traille; Nicolas Bacque; Con: David Aucagne x 5 Pen: David Aucagne x 2

Hughenden Stadium
Attendance: 2,700
Referee: Gareth Simmonds (Wales)

===== Round 4 =====
28 October 2000
19:30

Pau (France)	44 – 16	(Scotland) Glasgow Caledonians
Try: David Arrieta; Pascal Bomati x 2 Laurent Arbo; Thierry Cléda; Alain Lagouarde; Con: David Aucagne x 4 Pen: David Aucagne x 2	Preview; Report; Report	Try: Tommy Hayes; Con: Tommy Hayes; Pen: Tommy Hayes x 3

Stade du Hameau
Attendance: 10,000
Referee: Claudio Giacomel (Italy)

===== Round 5 =====
14 January 2001
15:00

Glasgow Caledonians (Scotland)	25 – 23	(Wales) Pontypridd
Try: Rowen Shepherd; Tommy Hayes x 2 Con: Tommy Hayes x 2 Pen: Tommy Hayes x 2	Report; Report; Report; Report	Try: Richard Parks; Pen: Lee Jarvis x 5 Drop: Lee Jarvis

McDiarmid Park
Attendance: 1,500
Referee: G Borreani (France)

===== Round 6 =====
20 January 2001
15:00

Leicester Tigers (England)	41 – 26	(Scotland) Glasgow Caledonians
Try: Dorian West; Jamie Hamilton; Ollie Smith; Richard Cockerill; Con: Tim Stimpson x 3 Pen: Tim Stimpson x 5	Report; Report; Report; Report	Try: Shaun Longstaff; Alan Bulloch; Gordon Simpson; Con: Tommy Hayes; Pen: Tommy Hayes x 3

Welford Road
Attendance: 12,260
Referee: A Lombardi (Italy)

=== Welsh-Scottish League ===
The top 5 Welsh teams plus Glasgow and Edinburgh qualified for next season's Heineken Cup.

==== 2000 – 01 league table ====
Team	P	W	D	L	PF	PA	+/-	Pts
(Wales) Swansea RFC	22	18	0	4	844	377	+467	54
(Wales) Cardiff RFC	22	16	0	6	665	410	+255	48
(Wales) Newport RFC	22	14	0	8	660	388	+272	42
(Wales) Llanelli RFC	22	14	0	8	663	484	+179	42
(Wales) Bridgend RFC	22	13	0	9	637	479	+158	39
(Wales) Neath RFC	22	12	1	9	639	453	+96	37
(Scotland) Glasgow Caledonians	22	12	0	10	645	608	+37	36
(Scotland) Edinburgh Reivers	22	11	0	11	540	667	-127	33
(Wales) Pontypridd RFC	22	10	0	12	635	541	+94	30
(Wales) Caerphilly RFC	22	5	1	16	464	729	-265	16
(Wales) Ebbw Vale RFC	22	5	0	17	428	741	-313	15
(Wales) Cross Keys RFC	22	1	0	21	247	1100	-853	3

==== Results ====
The Round 9 match of 25 November 2000 which was abandoned is shown here for completeness. The abandoned match and its related statistics are not included in player or squad statistics.

===== Round 1 =====
26 August 2000

Caerphilly RFC (Wales)	31 – 13	(Scotland) Glasgow Caledonians
Try: David Hawkins; Mark Workman; Gareth Jones; Con: Luke Richards x 2 Pen: Luke Richards x 4	Preview; Preview; Report; Report; Report	Try: Gordon Simpson; Con: Craig Chalmers; Pen: Craig Chalmers x 2

Virginia Park
Referee: T Rowlands (Treorchy).

===== Round 2 =====
2 September 2000

Glasgow Caledonians (Scotland)	52 – 28	(Wales) Cross Keys RFC
Try: Dave Hilton; Steve Griffiths; Mark McKenzie; Alan Bulloch; Roland Reid x 3 Con: Mark McKenzie x 4 Pen: Craig Chalmers x 2 Mark McKenzie	Preview; Report; Report; Report; Report	Try: A Howarth; G Stroud; Penalty try K Stewart; Con: J Webb x 4

Hughenden Stadium
Referee: A Ireland (Grangemouth)

===== Round 3 =====
5 September 2000

Bridgend RFC (Wales)	49 – 27	(Scotland) Glasgow Caledonians
Try: Ringer; Collier; Tomalolo; Molitika x 2 Jones; Durston; Con: Warlow x 4 Pen: Warlow x 2	Preview; Report; Report; Reaction	Try: Roland Reid; James Craig; Jon Steel; Con: Mark McKenzie x 3 Pen: Mark McKenzie x 2

Brewery Field
Referee: G Simmonds (Cardiff)

===== Round 4 =====
8 September 2000

Glasgow Caledonians (Scotland)	36 – 20	(Wales) Neath RFC
Try: Jon Steel; Gordon Bulloch; Martin Waite; Con: Mark McKenzie x 3 Pen: Mark McKenzie x 5	Preview; Preview; Report; Report	Try: Tuipulotu; Pen: Williams x 4 Drop: Brown

Hughenden Stadium
Referee: J Fleming (Boroughmuir)

===== Round 5 =====
15 September 2000

Edinburgh Reivers (Scotland)	26 – 33	(Scotland) Glasgow Caledonians
Try: Murray; Shiel; Con: Ross x 2 Pen: Ross x 4	Preview; Report	Try: Jason White; James Craig; Jonathan Stuart; Dave Hilton; Con: Mark McKenzie; Rowen Shepherd; Pen: Mark McKenzie; Rowen Shepherd; Drop: Mark McKenzie

Myreside
Referee: A Rowden (England)

===== Round 6 =====
22 September 2000

Glasgow Caledonians (Scotland)	43 – 37	(Wales) Ebbw Vale RFC
Try: Shaun Longstaff; Ian Jardine x 2 Graeme Beveridge; Con: Mark McKenzie x 4 Pen: Mark McKenzie x 5	Preview; Report; Report	Try: Potter; Morris; Connor; Hawker; Con: Strange x 2 Connor x 2 Pen: Strange x 3

Hughenden Stadium
Attendance: 2,100
Referee: J Fleming (Boroughmuir)

===== Round 7 =====
29 September 2000

Glasgow Caledonians (Scotland)	27 – 26	(Wales) Cardiff RFC
Try: Gordon McIlwham; Tommy Hayes; Con: Tommy Hayes; Pen: Tommy Hayes x 4 Mark McKenzie	Preview; Report; Report; Report	Try: Walne; Howley; Con: Jenkins x 2 Pen: Jenkins x 4

Hughenden Stadium
Attendance: 3,500
Referee: Patrick Thomas (France)

===== Round 8 =====
4 November 2000
postponed to
1 May 2001

Glasgow Caledonians (Scotland)	28 – 20	(Wales) Newport RFC
Try: James McLaren; Rory Kerr; Lee Harrison; Con: Tommy Hayes x 2 Pen: Tommy Hayes x 3	Preview; Report; Report; Report	Try: Pritchard; Raiwalui; Con: Mitchell x 2 Pen: Mitchell x 2

Hughenden Stadium
Referee: I Ramage (Berwick, SRFU)

===== Round 9 =====
25 November 2000
match abandoned
result does not stand

Pontypridd RFC (Wales)	14 – 21	(Scotland) Glasgow Caledonians
Try: Tau; Pen: Lee Jarvis x 3	Preview; Report; Report	Try: Gordon Simpson; James Craig; Tommy Hayes; Con: Tommy Hayes x 3

Referee: Nigel Owens (WRU)

25 November 2000
replayed match
11 April 2001

Pontypridd RFC (Wales)	41 – 18	(Scotland) Glasgow Caledonians
Try: Johnston; Sweeney x 2 Vunipola; Con: Davey x 3 Pen: Davey x 5	Preview; Preview; Report; Report	Try: Rory Kerr; James McLaren; Tommy Hayes; Pen: Tommy Hayes

Attendance: 3,000
Referee: Nigel Owens (WRU)

===== Round 10 =====
2 December 2000

Glasgow Caledonians (Scotland)	22 – 42	(Wales) Swansea RFC
Try: Jon Steel; Tommy Hayes; Jonathan Stuart; Con: Tommy Hayes x 2 Pen: Tommy Hayes	Preview; Report; Report; Report	Try: Colin Charvis x 3 Payne; Robinson; Con: Thomas x 4 Pen: Thomas x 3

McDiarmid Park, Perth
Attendance: 900
Referee: R Dickson (Madras College)

===== Round 11 =====
5 December 2000
postponed to
15 April 2001

Glasgow Caledonians (Scotland)	52 – 15	(Wales) Caerphilly RFC
Try: Glenn Metcalfe x 2 Fraser Stott; Gordon Simpson; Alan Bulloch; Jon Steel; Tommy Hayes; Rory Kerr; Con: Tommy Hayes x 6	Report; Report	Try: Hawkins; Lewis; Con: Richards; Pen: Richards

Hughenden Stadium
Attendance: 600
Referee: R Dickson (Madras FP)

===== Round 12 =====
9 December 2000

Cross Keys RFC (Wales)	3 – 54	(Scotland) Glasgow Caledonians
Pen: Bushell	Preview; Preview; Report; Report	Try: Andy Nicol x 2 Gordon Bulloch; Graeme Beveridge; Shaun Longstaff x 2 Roland Reid; James McLaren; Con: Tommy Hayes x 6 Andy Nicol

Pandy Park
Attendance: 800
Referee: Nigel Williams (Bryncoch)

===== Round 13 =====
16 December 2000

Glasgow Caledonians (Scotland)	45 – 35	(Wales) Llanelli RFC
Try: Donnie Macfadyen x2 Jon Steel; Jonathan Stuart; Con: Tommy Hayes x 2 Pen: Tommy Hayes x 7	Report; Report; Report; Report	Try: Quinnell x 2 Wyatt; James; Con: S Jones x 3 Pen: S Jones x 3

McDiarmid Park, Perth
Attendance: 1200
Referee: M Hall (RFU)

===== Round 14 =====
23 December 2000

Neath RFC (Wales)	34 – 29	(Scotland) Glasgow Caledonians
Try: D. Williams; S. Williams; Tuipulotu; K. James. Con: S. Williams; Pen: S. Williams x 4	Preview; Preview; Report; Report; Report	Try: Alan Bulloch; Graeme Beveridge; Roland Reid; Donnie Macfadyen; Shaun Longstaff; Con: Tommy Hayes x 2

The Gnoll
Attendance: 1500
Referee: Paul Adams (Welsh RFU)

===== Round 15 =====
26 December 2000
postponed to
23 March 2001

Glasgow Caledonians (Scotland)	32 – 35	(Scotland) Edinburgh Reivers
Try: Gordon Simpson; Jonathan Stuart x 2 James McLaren; Con: Tommy Hayes x 3 Pen: Tommy Hayes x 2	Preview; Report; Report	Try: Conan Sharman x 2 Cammy Murray; Allan Jacobsen; Con: Duncan Hodge x 3 Pen: Duncan Hodge x 3

Hughenden Stadium
Referee: J Fleming (Boroughmuir)

===== Round 16 =====
6 January 2001

Llanelli RFC (Wales)	10 – 16	(Scotland) Glasgow Caledonians
Try: S Jones; Con: S Jones; Pen: S Jones	Preview; Report; Report; Report; Report	Try: Gordon Simpson; Con: Tommy Hayes; Pen: Tommy Hayes x 2 Drop: James McLaren

Stradey Park
Referee: Clayton Thomas (Wales)

===== Round 17 =====
10 February 2001

Ebbw Vale RFC (Wales)	14 – 10	(Scotland) Glasgow Caledonians
Try: Shorney; L. Phillips; Con: Connor; Strange	Preview; Report; Report; Report	Try: James McLaren; Con: Tommy Hayes; Pen: Tommy Hayes

Eugene Cross Park
Attendance: 1400
Referee: T Rowlands (Treorchy)

===== Round 18 =====
10 March 2001

Cardiff RFC (Wales)	31 – 11	(Scotland) Glasgow Caledonians
Try: Rhys Williams; Gareth Thomas; Craig Morgan x 2 Con: Neil Jenkins x 4 Pen: Neil Jenkins	Preview; Report; Report; Report	Try: Fraser Stott; Pen: Tommy Hayes x 2

Cardiff Arms Park
Attendance: 5000
Referee: David McHugh (Ireland)

===== Round 19 =====
31 March 2001

Newport RFC (Wales)	6 – 27	(Scotland) Glasgow Caledonians
Pen: Shane Howarth x 2	Preview; Preview; Report; Report; Report; Report	Try: James McLaren; Jonathan Stuart; Fraser Stott; Barry Irving; Con: Tommy Hayes x 2 Drop: Tommy Hayes

Rodney Parade
Attendance: 6200
Referee: H F Lewis

===== Round 20 =====
20 April 2001

Glasgow Caledonians (Scotland)	15 – 22	(Wales) Bridgend RFC
Try: Shaun Longstaff; Gordon Simpson; Con: Tommy Hayes; Pen: Tommy Hayes	Preview; Report; Report; Report	Try: Jamie Ringer; Con: Craig Warlow; Pen: Craig Warlow x 4 Drop: Craig Warlow

Hughenden Stadium

===== Round 21 =====
27 April 2001

Glasgow Caledonians (Scotland)	45 – 29	(Wales) Pontypridd RFC
Try: Glenn Metcalfe; Rory Kerr; Barry Irving x 2 Jon Petrie x 2 Con: Barry Irving x 6 Pen: Barry Irving	Preview; Report; Report; Report	Try: Parker; John; Jenkins; Colderley; Con: Davey x 2 Graham; Pen: Davey

Hughenden Stadium
Attendance: 1800
Referee: John Steele (SRFU)

===== Round 22 =====
5 May 2001

Swansea RFC (Wales)	54 – 10	(Scotland) Glasgow Caledonians
Try: Winn; Payne; Weatherley; M. Robinson; Martens; Charvis; Lewis x 2. Con: C. Rees x 3 Henson x 4.	Report; Report; Report; Report; Report	Try: Andrew Henderson; Con: Tommy Hayes; Pen: Tommy Hayes

St. Helen's
Attendance: 4000
Referee: Hugh Watkins (WRU)

== Competitive debuts this season ==
A player's nationality shown is taken from the nationality at the highest honour for the national side obtained; or if never capped internationally their place of birth. Senior caps take precedence over junior caps or place of birth; junior caps take precedence over place of birth. A player's nationality at debut may be different from the nationality shown. Combination sides like the British and Irish Lions or Pacific Islanders are not national sides, or nationalities.

Players in BOLD font have been capped by their senior international XV side as nationality shown.

Players in Italic font have capped either by their international 7s side; or by the international XV 'A' side as nationality shown.

Players in normal font have not been capped at senior level.

A position in parentheses indicates that the player debuted as a substitute. A player may have made a prior debut for Glasgow Warriors in a non-competitive match, 'A' match or 7s match; these matches are not listed.

Tournaments where competitive debut made:

**Scottish Inter-District Championship**	**Welsh–Scottish League**	**WRU Challenge Cup**	**Celtic League**	**Celtic Cup**	**1872 Cup**	**Pro12**	**Pro14**	**Rainbow Cup**	**United Rugby Championship**	**European Challenge Cup**	**Heineken Cup / European Champions Cup**

Crosshatching indicates a jointly hosted match.

Number	Player nationality	Name	Position	Date of debut	Venue	Stadium	Opposition nationality	Opposition side	Tournament	Match result	Scoring debut
79	(Scotland)	**Jon Steel**	Wing	2000-08-26	Away	Virginia Park	(Wales)	Caerphilly	Welsh–Scottish League	Loss	Nil
80	(Scotland)	Mark McKenzie	Fly half	2000-08-26	Away	Virginia Park	(Wales)	Caerphilly	Welsh–Scottish League	Loss	Nil
81	(Scotland)	Chris Black	Scrum half	2000-09-02	Home	Hughenden Stadium	(Wales)	Cross Keys	Welsh–Scottish League	Win	Nil
82	(New Zealand)	Graeme Young	(Scrum half)	2000-09-02	Home	Hughenden Stadium	(Wales)	Cross Keys	Welsh–Scottish League	Win	Nil
83	(Scotland)	Lee Harrison	Prop	2000-09-05	Away	Brewery Field	(Wales)	Bridgend	Welsh–Scottish League	Loss	Nil
84	(Scotland)	Carlo di Ciacca	Hooker	2000-10-22	Home	Hughenden Stadium	(France)	Pau	European Champions Cup	Loss	Nil
85	(Scotland)	**James McLaren**	Centre	2000-10-22	Home	Hughenden Stadium	(France)	Pau	European Champions Cup	Loss	Nil
86	(Scotland)	**Euan Murray**	Prop	2000-10-22	Home	Hughenden Stadium	(France)	Pau	European Champions Cup	Loss	Nil
87	(Scotland)	Colin Stewart	Lock	2000-12-02	Home	McDiarmid Park	(Wales)	Swansea	Welsh–Scottish League	Loss	Nil
88	(Scotland)	**Andrew Henderson**	Centre	2001-04-15	Home	Hughenden Stadium	(Wales)	Caerphilly	Welsh–Scottish League	Win	Nil
89	(Scotland)	Kenny Sinclair	(Scrum half)	2001-05-05	Away	St. Helen's	(Wales)	Swansea	Welsh–Scottish League	Loss	Nil
90	(Scotland)	Scott Hutton	(Lock)	2001-05-05	Away	St. Helen's	(Wales)	Swansea	Welsh–Scottish League	Loss	Nil

== Sponsorship ==
=== Official kit supplier ===
Canterbury
