= 1998 Scotland rugby union tour of Oceania =

- Coach: Jim Telfer
- Tour captain: Rob Wainwright
Summary
P	W	D	L
Total
8	3	0	5
Test match
3	0	0	3
Opponent
P	W	D	L
Fiji
1	0	0	1
Australia
2	0	0	2

Tour chronology
- ← 1996 New Zealand 1999 South Africa →

The Scotland national rugby union team toured Oceania in May and June 1998, playing one test against Fiji and two against Australia, as well as tour matches against the state teams of Victoria, New South Wales and Queensland, a New South Wales Country side and the Australian Barbarians. They lost all three test matches, but won their first three tour matches before losses to the Australian Barbarians and Queensland.

Fiji's victory in the first match of the tour was their first against a Five Nations side.

== Squad ==
Managed by Arthur Hastie and coached by Jim Telfer, Scotland named an initial squad of 35 to travel to Fiji and Australia. Gavin Scott was called up during the tour as a replacement for Gordon Bulloch, who suffered a dislocated shoulder in the first test.

Name	Position	Club	Notes
Steve Brotherstone	Hooker	Melrose	
Gordon Bulloch	Hooker	West of Scotland	
Kevin McKenzie	Hooker	Stirling County	
Gavin Scott	Hooker	Dundee HSFP	Injury replacement
Dave Hilton	Prop	Bath	
Gordon McIlwham	Prop	Glasgow Hawks	
Matt Proudfoot	Prop	Melrose	
Mattie Stewart	Prop	Northampton	
Peter Wright	Prop	West of Scotland	
Stewart Campbell	Lock	Dundee HSFP	
Stuart Grimes	Lock	Watsonians	
Richard Metcalfe	Lock	Newcastle	
Scott Murray	Lock	Bedford	
Simon Holmes	Flanker	London Scottish	
Cameron Mather	Flanker	Watsonians	
Stuart Reid	Flanker	Boroughmuir	
Adam Roxburgh	Flanker	Kelso	
Gordon Simpson	Flanker	Kirkcaldy	
Rob Wainwright	Flanker	Dundee HSFP	
Eric Peters	Number 8	Bath	
Graeme Burns	Scrum-half	Watsonians	
Iain Fairley	Scrum-half	Kelso	
Bryan Redpath	Scrum-half	Melrose	
Duncan Hodge	Fly-half	Watsonians	
Gregor Townsend	Fly-half	Brive	
Alan Bulloch	Centre	West of Scotland	
Ian Jardine	Centre	Stirling County	
Jamie Mayer	Centre	Watsonians	
David Officer	Centre	Harlequins	
Hugh Gilmour	Wing	Heriot's FP	
Craig Joiner	Wing	Leicester	
Shaun Longstaff	Wing	Dundee HSFP	
Cameron Murray	Wing	Hawick	
Derrick Lee	Full-back	London Scottish	
Glenn Metcalfe	Full-back	Glasgow Hawks	
Rowen Shepherd	Full-back	Melrose	

== Matches ==
Date	Venue	Home	Score	Away	Source
26 May 1998	National Stadium, Suva	Fiji	51–26	Scotland	
31 May 1998	Olympic Park, Melbourne	Victoria	13–42	Scotland XV	
3 June 1998	Carrington Park, Bathurst	New South Wales Country	13–34	Scotland XV	
6 June 1998	Sydney Football Stadium, Sydney	New South Wales	10–34	Scotland XV	
9 June 1998	Penrith Stadium, Penrith	Australian Barbarians	39–34	Scotland XV	
13 June 1998	Sydney Football Stadium, Sydney	Australia	45–3	Scotland	
16 June 1998	Ballymore Stadium, Brisbane	Queensland	27–22	Scotland XV	
20 June 1998	Ballymore Stadium, Brisbane	Australia	33–11	Scotland	

=== Fiji vs Scotland ===
26 May 1998

Fiji	51–26	Scotland
Try: Tuilevu (3); Lasagavibau; Naevo; Veitayaki; Waqa; Con: Little; Serevi (4); Pen: Little; Serevi	Report	Try: G. Bulloch; Gilmour; Con: Lee (2); Pen: Lee (4)

National Stadium, Suva
Referee: Paul Honiss (New Zealand)

FB	15	Jone Waqabitu
RW	14	Fero Lasagavibau
OC	13	Meli Nakauta
IC	12	Sale Sorovaki (c)
LW	11	Aisea Tuilevu
FH	10	Nicky Little	(substituted off) 50'
SH	9	Samisoni Rabaka	(substituted off) 79'
N8	8	Meli Tamanitoakula	(substituted off) 50'
OF	7	Alfie Mocelutu	(substituted off) 62'
BF	6	Apenisa Naevo
RL	5	Emori Katalau
LL	4	Simon Raiwalui
TP	3	Mosese Taga
HK	2	Isaia Rasila
LP	1	Joeli Veitayaki
Replacements:
FH		Waisale Serevi	(substituted on) 50'
FL		Samu Saumaisue	(substituted on) 50'
FL		Ifereimi Tawake	(substituted on) 62'
SH		Jacob Rauluni	(substituted on) 79'
Coach:
(New Zealand) Brad Johnstone

FB	15	Derrick Lee
RW	14	Hugh Gilmour
OC	13	Cameron Murray
IC	12	Ian Jardine	(substituted off) 23'	(substituted on) 33'
LW	11	Shaun Longstaff
FH	10	Gregor Townsend
SH	9	Bryan Redpath
N8	8	Eric Peters
OF	7	Adam Roxburgh
BF	6	Rob Wainwright (c)
RL	5	Scott Murray	(substituted off) 70'
LL	4	Stuart Grimes
TP	3	Matt Proudfoot	(substituted off) 60'
HK	2	Gordon Bulloch
LP	1	Gordon McIlwham
Replacements:
FB		Rowen Shepherd	(substituted on) 23'	(substituted off) 33'
PR		Mattie Stewart	(substituted on) 60'
LK		Stewart Campbell	(substituted on) 70'
Coach:
(Scotland) Jim Telfer

=== Victoria vs Scotland XV ===
30 May 1998

Victoria	13–42	Scotland XV
Try: Frater; Con: Goodman; Pen: Goodman (2)		Try: G. Metcalfe (2); A. Bulloch; Hodge; Mather; Shepherd; Con: Hodge (3); Pen: Hodge (2)

Olympic Park, Melbourne
Referee: George Ayoub (New South Wales)

=== New South Wales Country vs Scotland XV ===
3 June 1998

New South Wales Country	13–34	Scotland XV
Try: Hurdley (2); Pen: Friis		Try: Burns; McIlwham; Shepherd; Townsend; Penalty try Con: Lee (3); Pen: Lee

Carrington Park, Bathurst
Referee: Lyndon Bray (New South Wales)

=== New South Wales vs Scotland XV ===
6 June 1998

New South Wales	10–34	Scotland XV
Try: Dowling; Williams		Try: Joiner; Longstaff; G. Metcalfe; S. Murray; Con: Shepherd (4); Pen: Shepherd (2)

Sydney Football Stadium, Sydney
Referee: Scott Young (New South Wales)

=== Australian Barbarians vs Scotland XV ===
9 June 1998

Australian Barbarians	39–34	Scotland XV
Try: Nalatu (2); Drahm; Fenukitau; Howard; Langford; Con: Drahm (2); Flatley; Pen: Flatley		Try: Lee (2); Jardine; Mayer; Roxburgh; Con: Hodge (3); Pen: Hodge

Penrith Stadium, Penrith
Referee: Wayne Erickson (New South Wales)

=== Australia vs Scotland (1st test) ===
13 June 1998
20:00 AEST

Australia	45–3	Scotland
Try: Burke; Horan; Roff; Tune; Wilson; Con: Burke (4); Pen: Burke (4)	Report	Pen: Lee

Sydney Football Stadium, Sydney
Referee: André Watson (South Africa)

FB	15	Matt Burke
RW	14	Ben Tune
OC	13	Daniel Herbert
IC	12	Tim Horan
LW	11	Joe Roff
FH	10	Stephen Larkham
SH	9	George Gregan
N8	8	Toutai Kefu	(substituted off) 49'
OF	7	David Wilson
BF	6	Matt Cockbain	(substituted off) 53'
RL	5	John Eales (c)
LL	4	Tom Bowman
TP	3	Andrew Blades
HK	2	Phil Kearns	(substituted off) 71'
LP	1	Richard Harry	(substituted off) 66'
Replacements:
SH	16	Chris Whitaker
CE	17	Nathan Grey
CE	18	Jason Little
FL	19	Viliami Ofahengaue	(substituted on) 49'
FL	20	Owen Finegan	(substituted on) 53'
PR	21	Dan Crowley	(substituted on) 66'
HK	22	Jeremy Paul	(substituted on) 71'
Coach:
Rod Macqueen

FB	15	Glenn Metcalfe
RW	14	Derrick Lee
OC	13	Cameron Murray
IC	12	Rowen Shepherd
LW	11	Shaun Longstaff
FH	10	Gregor Townsend
SH	9	Bryan Redpath
N8	8	Eric Peters
OF	7	Gordon Simpson	(substituted off) 77'
BF	6	Rob Wainwright (c)
RL	5	Stuart Grimes
LL	4	Scott Murray
TP	3	Matt Proudfoot
HK	2	Gordon Bulloch	(substituted off) 5'
LP	1	Dave Hilton
Replacements:
WG	16	Craig Joiner
FH	17	Duncan Hodge
SH	18	Graeme Burns
FL	19	Adam Roxburgh	(substituted on) 77'
LK	20	Stewart Campbell
PR	21	Gordon McIlwham
HK	22	Kevin McKenzie	(substituted on) 5'
Coach:
(Scotland) Jim Telfer

=== Queensland vs Scotland XV ===
16 June 1998

Queensland	27–22	Scotland XV
Try: Flatley; Little; Williams; Con: Drahm (3); Pen: Drahm (2)		Try: Brotherstone; Con: Hodge; Pen: Hodge (5)

Ballymore Stadium, Brisbane
Referee: Stuart Dickinson (New South Wales)

=== Australia vs Scotland (2nd test) ===
20 June 1998
20:00 AEST

Australia	33–11	Scotland
Try: Grey; Larkham; Ofahenguae; Tune; Con: Burke (2); Pen: Burke (3)	Report	Try: Hodge; Pen: Lee (2)

Ballymore Stadium, Brisbane
Referee: Brian Campsall (England)

FB	15	Matt Burke
RW	14	Ben Tune	(substituted off) 62'
OC	13	Daniel Herbert
IC	12	Tim Horan	(substituted off) 74'
LW	11	Joe Roff
FH	10	Stephen Larkham
SH	9	George Gregan
N8	8	Toutai Kefu	(substituted off) 40'
OF	7	David Wilson
BF	6	Matt Cockbain	(substituted off) 23'	(substituted on) 31'	(substituted off) 71'
RL	5	John Eales (c)
LL	4	Tom Bowman
TP	3	Andrew Blades	(substituted off) 60'
HK	2	Phil Kearns
LP	1	Richard Harry
Replacements:
SH	16	Chris Whitaker
CE	17	Nathan Grey	(substituted on) 74'
CE	18	Jason Little	(substituted on) 62'
FL	19	Viliami Ofahengaue	(substituted on) 40'
FL	20	Owen Finegan	(substituted on) 23'	(substituted off) 31'	(substituted on) 71'
PR	21	Dan Crowley	(substituted on) 60'
HK	22	Jeremy Paul
Coach:
Rod Macqueen

FB	15	Glenn Metcalfe	(substituted off) 66'
RW	14	Derrick Lee
OC	13	Cameron Murray	(substituted off) 59'
IC	12	Rowen Shepherd
LW	11	Shaun Longstaff
FH	10	Gregor Townsend
SH	9	Bryan Redpath
N8	8	Eric Peters
OF	7	Gordon Simpson	(substituted off) 75'
BF	6	Rob Wainwright (c)
RL	5	Stuart Grimes	(substituted off) 75'
LL	4	Scott Murray
TP	3	Matt Proudfoot
HK	2	Gordon Bulloch
LP	1	Dave Hilton	(substituted off) 62'
Replacements:
WG	16	Craig Joiner	(substituted on) 59'
FH	17	Duncan Hodge	(substituted on) 66'
SH	18	Graeme Burns
FL	19	Adam Roxburgh	(substituted on) 75'
LK	20	Stewart Campbell	(substituted on) 75'
PR	21	Gordon McIlwham	(substituted on) 62'
HK	22	Steve Brotherstone
Coach:
(Scotland) Jim Telfer
