= 2000–01 Welsh-Scottish League =

- Countries: Scotland Wales
- Champions: (Wales) Swansea RFC
- Runners-up: (Wales) Cardiff RFC
- Matches played: 132

Swansea won the second Welsh-Scottish League.

== 2000-2001 League Table ==
The top 5 Welsh teams plus Glasgow and Edinburgh qualified for next season's Heineken Cup.

Team	P	W	D	L	PF	PA	+/-	Pts
(Wales) Swansea RFC	22	18	0	4	844	377	+467	54
(Wales) Cardiff RFC	22	16	0	6	665	410	+255	48
(Wales) Newport RFC	22	14	0	8	660	388	+272	42
(Wales) Llanelli RFC	22	14	0	8	663	484	+179	42
(Wales) Bridgend RFC	22	13	0	9	637	479	+158	39
(Wales) Neath RFC	22	12	1	9	639	453	+96	37
(Scotland) Glasgow Caledonians	22	12	0	10	645	608	+37	36
(Scotland) Edinburgh Reivers	22	11	0	11	540	667	-127	33
(Wales) Pontypridd RFC	22	10	0	12	635	541	+94	30
(Wales) Caerphilly RFC	22	5	1	16	464	729	-265	16
(Wales) Ebbw Vale RFC	22	5	0	17	428	741	-313	15
(Wales) Cross Keys RFC	22	1	0	21	247	1100	-853	3

== Results ==
=== Round 1 ===
26 August 2000

Caerphilly RFC (Wales)	31 – 13	(Scotland) Glasgow Caledonians
Try: David Hawkins; Mark Workman; Gareth Jones; Con: Luke Richards x 2 Pen: Luke Richards x 4	Preview; Preview; Report; Report; Report	Try: Gordon Simpson; Con: Craig Chalmers; Pen: Craig Chalmers x 2

Virginia Park
Referee: T Rowlands (Treorchy).

26 August 2000

Cardiff RFC (Wales)	35 – 30	(Wales) Neath RFC
	Report

26 August 2000

Cross Keys RFC (Wales)	12 – 37	(Wales) Bridgend RFC
	Report

26 August 2000

Edinburgh Reivers (Scotland)	43 – 25	(Wales) Ebbw Vale RFC
	Report

26 August 2000

Llanelli RFC (Wales)	12 – 11	(Wales) Newport RFC
	Report

26 August 2000

Pontypridd RFC (Wales)	33 – 22	(Wales) Swansea RFC
	Report

=== Round 2 ===
2 September 2000

Bridgend RFC (Wales)	41 – 30	(Wales) Llanelli RFC

2 September 2000

Cardiff RFC (Wales)	80 – 16	(Scotland) Edinburgh Reivers

2 September 2000

Ebbw Vale RFC (Wales)	23 – 32	(Wales) Pontypridd RFC

2 September 2000

Glasgow Caledonians (Scotland)	52 – 28	(Wales) Cross Keys RFC
Try: Dave Hilton; Steve Griffiths; Mark McKenzie; Alan Bulloch; Roland Reid x 3 Con: Mark McKenzie x 4 Pen: Craig Chalmers x 2 Mark McKenzie	Report; Report	Try: A Howarth; G Stroud; Penalty try K Stewart; Con: J Webb x 4

Referee: A Ireland

2 September 2000

Newport RFC (Wales)	24 – 13	(Wales) Neath RFC

2 September 2000

Swansea RFC (Wales)	59 – 20	(Wales) Caerphilly RFC

=== Round 3 ===
5 September 2000

Bridgend RFC (Wales)	49 – 27	(Scotland) Glasgow Caledonians
Try: Ringer; Collier; Tomalolo; Molitika x 2 Jones; Durston; Con: Warlow x 4 Pen: Warlow x 2	Report; Report; Reaction	Try: Roland Reid; James Craig; Jon Steel; Con: Mark McKenzie x 3 Pen: Mark McKenzie x 2

Brewery Field
Referee: G Simmonds (Cardiff)

5 September 2000

Ebbw Vale RFC (Wales)	49 – 10	(Wales) Cross Keys RFC

5 September 2000

Edinburgh Reivers (Scotland)	28 – 25	(Wales) Llanelli RFC

5 September 2000

Neath RFC (Wales)	33 – 29	(Wales) Pontypridd RFC

5 September 2000

Newport RFC (Wales)	24 – 13	(Wales) Swansea RFC

5 September 2000
postponed to
10 May 2001

Cardiff RFC (Wales)	43 – 20	(Wales) Caerphilly RFC

=== Round 4 ===
8 September 2000

Bridgend RFC (Wales)	25 – 3	(Scotland) Edinburgh Reivers
	Report

8 September 2000

Caerphilly RFC (Wales)	36 – 3	(Wales) Cross Keys RFC

8 September 2000

Glasgow Caledonians (Scotland)	36 – 20	(Wales) Neath RFC
Try: Jon Steel; Gordon Bulloch; Martin Waite; Con: Mark McKenzie x 3 Pen: Mark McKenzie x 5	Preview; Preview; Report; Report	Try: Tuipulotu; Pen: Williams x 4 Drop: Brown

Hughenden Stadium
Referee: J Fleming (Boroughmuir)

8 September 2000

Newport RFC (Wales)	56 – 24	(Wales) Ebbw Vale RFC

8 September 2000

Pontypridd RFC (Wales)	6 – 28	(Wales) Cardiff RFC

8 September 2000

Swansea RFC (Wales)	28 – 21	(Wales) Llanelli RFC

=== Round 5 ===
15 September 2000

Cardiff RFC (Wales)	29 – 16	(Wales) Newport RFC

15 September 2000

Cross Keys RFC (Wales)	12 – 60	(Wales) Pontypridd RFC

15 September 2000

Ebbw Vale RFC (Wales)	15 – 48	(Wales) Bridgend RFC

15 September 2000

Edinburgh Reivers (Scotland)	26 – 33	(Scotland) Glasgow Caledonians
Try: Murray; Shiel; Con: Ross x 2 Pen: Ross x 4	Preview; Report	Try: Jason White; James Craig; Jonathan Stuart; Dave Hilton; Con: Mark McKenzie; Rowen Shepherd; Pen: Mark McKenzie; Rowen Shepherd; Drop: Mark McKenzie

Myreside
Referee: A Rowden (England)

15 September 2000

Llanelli RFC (Wales)	46 – 26	(Wales) Caerphilly RFC

15 September 2000

Neath RFC (Wales)	24 – 9	(Wales) Swansea RFC

=== Round 6 ===
22 September 2000

Bridgend RFC (Wales)	33 – 37	(Wales) Cardiff RFC

22 September 2000

Caerphilly RFC (Wales)	33 – 33	(Wales) Neath RFC

22 September 2000

Cross Keys RFC (Wales)	7 – 46	(Wales) Llanelli RFC

22 September 2000

Glasgow Caledonians (Scotland)	43 – 37	(Wales) Ebbw Vale RFC
Try: Shaun Longstaff; Ian Jardine x 2 Graeme Beveridge; Con: Mark McKenzie x 4 Pen: Mark McKenzie x 5	Preview; Report; Report	Try: Potter; Morris; Connor; Hawker; Con: Strange x 2 Connor x 2 Pen: Strange x 3

Hughenden Stadium
Attendance: 2,100
Referee: J Fleming (Boroughmuir)

22 September 2000

Pontypridd RFC (Wales)	22 – 44	(Wales) Newport RFC

22 September 2000

Swansea RFC (Wales)	69 – 20	(Scotland) Edinburgh Reivers

=== Round 7 ===
29 September 2000

Ebbw Vale RFC (Wales)	6 – 55	(Wales) Swansea RFC

29 September 2000

Edinburgh Reivers (Scotland)	43 – 33	(Wales) Caerphilly RFC

29 September 2000

Glasgow Caledonians (Scotland)	27 – 26	(Wales) Cardiff RFC
Try: Gordon McIlwham; Tommy Hayes; Con: Tommy Hayes; Pen: Tommy Hayes x 4 Mark McKenzie	Preview; Report; Report; Report	Try: Walne; Howley; Con: Jenkins x 2 Pen: Jenkins x 4

Hughenden Stadium
Attendance: 3,500
Referee: Patrick Thomas (France)

29 September 2000

Llanelli RFC (Wales)	53 – 20	(Wales) Pontypridd RFC

29 September 2000

Neath RFC (Wales)	73 – 22	(Wales) Cross Keys RFC

29 September 2000

Newport RFC (Wales)	34 – 29	(Wales) Bridgend RFC

=== Round 8 ===
4 November 2000

Caerphilly RFC (Wales)	45 – 14	(Wales) Ebbw Vale RFC

4 November 2000

Llanelli RFC (Wales)	31 – 28	(Wales) Neath RFC

4 November 2000

Pontypridd RFC (Wales)	38 – 20	(Wales) Bridgend RFC

4 November 2000

Swansea RFC (Wales)	29 – 22	(Wales) Cardiff RFC

4 November 2000
postponed to
26 January 2001

Cross Keys RFC (Wales)	16 – 10	(Scotland) Edinburgh Reivers

4 November 2000
postponed to
1 May 2001

Glasgow Caledonians (Scotland)	28 – 20	(Wales) Newport RFC
Try: James McLaren; Rory Kerr; Lee Harrison; Con: Tommy Hayes x 2 Pen: Tommy Hayes x 3	Preview; Report; Report; Report	Try: Pritchard; Raiwalui; Con: Mitchell x 2 Pen: Mitchell x 2

Hughenden Stadium
Referee: I Ramage (Berwick, SRFU)

=== Round 9 ===
25 November 2000

Neath RFC (Wales)	17 – 22	(Scotland) Edinburgh Reivers

25 November 2000
match abandoned
result does not stand

Pontypridd RFC (Wales)	14 – 21	(Scotland) Glasgow Caledonians
Try: Tau; Pen: Jarvis x 3	Preview; Report; Report	Try: Gordon Simpson; James Craig; Tommy Hayes; Con: Tommy Hayes x 3

Referee: Nigel Owens (WRU)

25 November 2000
postponed to
26 January 2001

Llanelli RFC (Wales)	42 – 15	(Wales) Ebbw Vale RFC

25 November 2000
postponed to
3 March 2001

Caerphilly RFC (Wales)	8 – 53	(Wales) Newport RFC

25 November 2000
postponed to
28 March 2001

Cross Keys RFC (Wales)	23 – 33	(Wales) Cardiff RFC

25 November 2000
replayed match
11 April 2001

Pontypridd RFC (Wales)	41 – 18	(Scotland) Glasgow Caledonians
Try: Johnston; Sweeney x 2 Vunipola; Con: Davey x 3 Pen: Davey x 5	Preview; Preview; Report; Report	Try: Rory Kerr; James McLaren; Tommy Hayes; Pen: Tommy Hayes

Attendance: 3,000
Referee: Nigel Owens (WRU)

25 November 2000
postponed to
9 May 2001

Swansea RFC (Wales)	35 – 20	(Wales) Bridgend RFC

=== Round 10 ===
1 December 2000

Bridgend RFC (Wales)	46 – 13	(Wales) Caerphilly RFC

1 December 2000

Cardiff RFC (Wales)	22 – 9	(Wales) Llanelli RFC

1 December 2000

Ebbw Vale RFC (Wales)	10 – 33	(Wales) Neath RFC

1 December 2000

Edinburgh Reivers (Scotland)	22 – 16	(Wales) Pontypridd RFC

1 December 2000

Glasgow Caledonians (Scotland)	22 – 42	(Wales) Swansea RFC
Try: Jon Steel; Tommy Hayes; Jonathan Stuart; Con: Tommy Hayes x 2 Pen: Tommy Hayes	Preview; Report; Report; Report	Try: Charvis x 3 Payne; Robinson; Con: Thomas x 4 Pen: Thomas x 3

McDiarmid Park, Perth
Attendance: 900
Referee: R Dickson (Madras College)

1 December 2000

Newport RFC (Wales)	53 – 5	(Wales) Cross Keys RFC

=== Round 11 ===
5 December 2000

Bridgend RFC (Wales)	67 – 0	(Wales) Cross Keys RFC

5 December 2000

Ebbw Vale RFC (Wales)	24 – 10	(Scotland) Edinburgh Reivers

5 December 2000

Neath RFC (Wales)	12 – 18	(Wales) Cardiff RFC

5 December 2000

Newport RFC (Wales)	20 – 9	(Wales) Llanelli RFC

5 December 2000

Swansea RFC (Wales)	42 – 16	(Wales) Pontypridd RFC

5 December 2000
postponed to
15 April 2001

Glasgow Caledonians (Scotland)	52 – 15	(Wales) Caerphilly RFC
Try: Glenn Metcalfe x 2 Fraser Stott; Gordon Simpson; Alan Bulloch; Jon Steel; Tommy Hayes; Rory Kerr; Con: Tommy Hayes x 6	Report; Report	Try: Hawkins; Lewis; Con: Richards; Pen: Richards

Hughenden Stadium
Attendance: 600
Referee: R Dickson (Madras FP)

=== Round 12 ===
9 December 2000

Caerphilly RFC (Wales)	10 – 48	(Wales) Swansea RFC

9 December 2000

Cross Keys RFC (Wales)	3 – 54	(Scotland) Glasgow Caledonians
Pen: Bushell	Preview; Preview; Report; Report	Try: Andy Nicol x 2 Gordon Bulloch; Graeme Beveridge; Shaun Longstaff x 2 Roland Reid; James McLaren; Con: Tommy Hayes x 6 Andy Nicol

Pandy Park
Attendance: 800
Referee: Nigel Williams (Bryncoch)

9 December 2000

Edinburgh Reivers (Scotland)	29 – 11	(Wales) Cardiff RFC

9 December 2000

Llanelli RFC (Wales)	30 – 27	(Wales) Bridgend RFC

9 December 2000

Neath RFC (Wales)	36 – 26	(Wales) Newport RFC

9 December 2000

Pontypridd RFC (Wales)	54 – 0	(Wales) Ebbw Vale RFC

=== Round 13 ===
16 December 2000

Bridgend RFC (Wales)	28 – 18	(Wales) Neath RFC

16 December 2000

Cardiff RFC (Wales)	27 – 16	(Wales) Ebbw Vale RFC

16 December 2000

Glasgow Caledonians (Scotland)	45 – 35	(Wales) Llanelli RFC
Try: Donnie Macfadyen x2 Jon Steel; Jonathan Stuart; Con: Tommy Hayes x 2 Pen: Tommy Hayes x 7	Report; Report; Report; Report	Try: Quinnell x 2 Wyatt; James; Con: S Jones x 3 Pen: S Jones x 3

McDiarmid Park, Perth
Attendance: 1200
Referee: M Hall (RFU)

16 December 2000

Newport RFC (Wales)	55 – 15	(Scotland) Edinburgh Reivers

16 December 2000

Pontypridd RFC (Wales)	41 – 7	(Wales) Caerphilly RFC

16 December 2000

Swansea RFC (Wales)	55 – 3	(Wales) Cross Keys RFC

=== Round 14 ===
23 December 2000

Cardiff RFC (Wales)	21 – 14	(Wales) Pontypridd RFC

23 December 2000

Cross Keys RFC (Wales)	11 – 27	(Wales) Caerphilly RFC

23 December 2000

Ebbw Vale RFC (Wales)	10 – 19	(Wales) Newport RFC

23 December 2000

Edinburgh Reivers (Scotland)	23 – 13	(Wales) Bridgend RFC
	Report

23 December 2000

Llanelli RFC (Wales)	22 – 23	(Wales) Swansea RFC

23 December 2000

Neath RFC (Wales)	34 – 29	(Scotland) Glasgow Caledonians
Try: D. Williams; S. Williams; Tuipulotu; K. James. Con: S. Williams; Pen: S. Williams x 4	Preview; Report	Try: Alan Bulloch; Graeme Beveridge; Roland Reid; Donnie Macfadyen; Shaun Longstaff; Con: Tommy Hayes x 2

The Gnoll
Attendance: 1500
Referee: Paul Adams (Welsh RFU)

=== Round 15 ===
26 December 2000

Caerphilly RFC (Wales)	20 – 40	(Wales) Llanelli RFC

26 December 2000

Newport RFC (Wales)	16 – 23	(Wales) Cardiff RFC

26 December 2000

Pontypridd RFC (Wales)	59 – 19	(Wales) Cross Keys RFC

26 December 2000

Swansea RFC (Wales)	45 – 23	(Wales) Neath RFC

26 December 2000
postponed to
20 February 2001

Bridgend RFC (Wales)	24 – 12	(Wales) Ebbw Vale RFC

26 December 2000
postponed to
23 March 2001

Glasgow Caledonians (Scotland)	32 – 35	(Scotland) Edinburgh Reivers
Try: Gordon Simpson; Jonathan Stuart x 2 James McLaren; Con: Tommy Hayes x 3 Pen: Tommy Hayes x 2	Preview; Report; Report	Try: Conan Sharman x 2 Cammy Murray; Allan Jacobsen; Con: Duncan Hodge x 3 Pen: Duncan Hodge x 3

Hughenden Stadium
Referee: J Fleming (Boroughmuir)

=== Round 16 ===
5 January 2001

Edinburgh Reivers (Scotland)	17 – 15	(Wales) Newport RFC

5 January 2001
postponed to
26 January 2001

Caerphilly RFC (Wales)	12 – 19	(Wales) Pontypridd RFC

5 January 2001
postponed to
7 March 2001

Ebbw Vale RFC (Wales)	12 – 7	(Wales) Cardiff RFC

5 January 2001
postponed to
1 May 2001

Cross Keys RFC (Wales)	8 – 57	(Wales) Swansea RFC

5 January 2001
postponed to
1 May 2001

Neath RFC (Wales)	13 – 12	(Wales) Bridgend RFC

6 January 2001

Llanelli RFC (Wales)	10 – 16	(Scotland) Glasgow Caledonians
Try: S Jones; Con: S Jones; Pen: S Jones	Preview; Report; Report; Report; Report	Try: Gordon Simpson; Con: Tommy Hayes; Pen: Tommy Hayes x 2 Drop: James McLaren

Stradey Park
Referee: Clayton Thomas (Wales)

=== Round 17 ===
10 February 2001

Cardiff RFC (Wales)	19 – 24	(Wales) Bridgend RFC

10 February 2001

Ebbw Vale RFC (Wales)	14 – 10	(Scotland) Glasgow Caledonians
Try: Shorney; L. Phillips; Con: Connor; Strange	Preview; Report; Report; Report	Try: James McLaren; Con: Tommy Hayes; Pen: Tommy Hayes

Eugene Cross Park
Attendance: 1400
Referee: T Rowlands (Treorchy)

10 February 2001

Edinburgh Reivers (Scotland)	16 – 24	(Wales) Swansea RFC

10 February 2001

Llanelli RFC (Wales)	53 – 22	(Wales) Cross Keys RFC

10 February 2001

Neath RFC (Wales)	22 – 17	(Wales) Caerphilly RFC

10 February 2001

Newport RFC (Wales)	33 – 13	(Wales) Pontypridd RFC

=== Round 18 ===
10 March 2001

Bridgend RFC (Wales)	16 – 13	(Wales) Newport RFC

10 March 2001

Caerphilly RFC (Wales)	5 – 15	(Scotland) Edinburgh Reivers

10 March 2001

Cardiff RFC (Wales)	31 – 11	(Scotland) Glasgow Caledonians
Try: Gethin Rhys Williams; Gareth Thomas; Craig Morgan x 2 Con: Neil Jenkins x 4 Pen: Neil Jenkins	Preview; Report; Report; Report	Try: Fraser Stott; Pen: Tommy Hayes x 2

Cardiff Arms Park
Attendance: 5000
Referee: David McHugh (Ireland)

10 March 2001

Cross Keys RFC (Wales)	12 – 66	(Wales) Neath RFC

10 March 2001

Pontypridd RFC (Wales)	15 – 19	(Wales) Llanelli RFC

10 March 2001

Swansea RFC (Wales)	68 – 17	(Wales) Ebbw Vale RFC

=== Round 19 ===
31 March 2001

Bridgend RFC (Wales)	16 – 13	(Wales) Pontypridd RFC

31 March 2001

Cardiff RFC (Wales)	21 – 14	(Wales) Swansea RFC

31 March 2001

Ebbw Vale RFC (Wales)	16 – 22	(Wales) Caerphilly RFC

31 March 2001

Edinburgh Reivers (Scotland)	48 – 12	(Wales) Cross Keys RFC
	Preview; Report

31 March 2001

Neath RFC (Wales)	3 – 10	(Wales) Llanelli RFC

31 March 2001

Newport RFC (Wales)	6 – 27	(Scotland) Glasgow Caledonians
Pen: Shane Howarth x 2	Preview; Preview; Report; Report; Report; Report	Try: James McLaren; Jonathan Stuart; Fraser Stott; Barry Irving; Con: Tommy Hayes x 2 Drop: Tommy Hayes

Rodney Parade
Attendance: 6200
Referee: H F Lewis

=== Round 20 ===
20 April 2001

Caerphilly RFC (Wales)	19 – 50	(Wales) Cardiff RFC

20 April 2001

Cross Keys RFC (Wales)	14 – 42	(Wales) Ebbw Vale RFC

20 April 2001

Glasgow Caledonians (Scotland)	15 – 22	(Wales) Bridgend RFC
Try: Shaun Longstaff; Gordon Simpson; Con: Tommy Hayes; Pen: Tommy Hayes	Preview; Report; Report; Report	Try: Jamie Ringer; Con: Craig Warlow; Pen: Craig Warlow x 4 Drop: Craig Warlow

Hughenden Stadium

20 April 2001

Llanelli RFC (Wales)	43 – 28	(Scotland) Edinburgh Reivers

20 April 2001

Pontypridd RFC (Wales)	21 – 22	(Wales) Neath RFC

20 April 2001

Swansea RFC (Wales)	19 – 3	(Wales) Newport RFC

=== Round 21 ===
27 April 2001

Bridgend RFC (Wales)	16 – 34	(Wales) Swansea RFC

27 April 2001

Cardiff RFC (Wales)	57 – 0	(Wales) Cross Keys RFC

27 April 2001

Ebbw Vale RFC (Wales)	14 – 43	(Wales) Llanelli RFC

27 April 2001

Edinburgh Reivers (Scotland)	43 – 19	(Wales) Neath RFC

27 April 2001

Glasgow Caledonians (Scotland)	45 – 29	(Wales) Pontypridd RFC
Try: Glenn Metcalfe; Rory Kerr; Barry Irving x 2 Jon Petrie x 2 Con: Barry Irving x 6 Pen: Barry Irving	Preview; Report; Report; Report	Try: Parker; John; Jenkins; Colderley; Con: Davey x 2 Graham; Pen: Davey

Hughenden Stadium
Attendance: 1800
Referee: John Steele (SRFU)

27 April 2001

Newport RFC (Wales)	31 – 22	(Wales) Caerphilly RFC

=== Round 22 ===
4 May 2001

Caerphilly RFC (Wales)	23 – 31	(Wales) Bridgend RFC

4 May 2001

Cross Keys RFC (Wales)	5 – 66	(Wales) Newport RFC

4 May 2001

Llanelli RFC (Wales)	34 – 25	(Wales) Cardiff RFC

4 May 2001

Neath RFC (Wales)	36 – 33	(Wales) Ebbw Vale RFC

4 May 2001

Pontypridd RFC (Wales)	44 – 30	(Scotland) Edinburgh Reivers

4 May 2001

Swansea RFC (Wales)	54 – 10	(Scotland) Glasgow Caledonians
Try: Winn; Payne; Weatherley; M. Robinson; Martens; Charvis; Lewis x 2. Con: C. Rees x 3 Henson x 4.	Report; Report; Report; Report; Report	Try: Andrew Henderson; Con: Tommy Hayes; Pen: Tommy Hayes

St. Helen's
Attendance: 4000
Referee: Hugh Watkins (WRU)
