= 1998 Five Nations Championship squads =

Rugby union competition squads

== England ==
Head Coach: Clive Woodward

1. Adedayo Adebayo
2. Garath Archer
3. Neil Back
4. Scott Benton
5. Kyran Bracken
6. Mike Catt
7. Richard Cockerill
8. Lawrence Dallaglio (c.)
9. Matt Dawson
10. Phil de Glanville
11. Tony Diprose
12. Darren Garforth
13. Paul Grayson
14. Will Greenwood
15. Danny Grewcock
16. Jeremy Guscott
17. Austin Healey
18. Richard Hill
19. Martin Johnson
20. Jason Leonard
21. Matt Perry
22. David Rees
23. Mark Regan
24. Graham Rowntree
25. Dean Ryan
26. Phil Vickery
27. Dorian West
28. Jonny Wilkinson

== France ==
Head Coach: Jean-Claude Skrela

1. David Aucagne
2. Jean-Marc Aue
3. Philippe Benetton
4. Philippe Bernat-Salles
5. Olivier Brouzet
6. Christian Califano
7. Philippe Carbonneau
8. Thomas Castaignède
9. Thierry Cléda
10. Marc Dal Maso
11. Christophe Dominici
12. Richard Dourthe
13. Fabien Galthié
14. Xavier Garbajosa
15. Stéphane Glas
16. Raphaël Ibañez (c.)
17. Christophe Lamaison
18. Marc Lièvremont
19. Thomas Lièvremont
20. Olivier Magne
21. Fabien Pelous
22. Jean-Luc Sadourny
23. Cédric Soulette
24. Franck Tournaire

== Ireland ==
Head Coach: Brian Ashton (resigned)/Warren Gatland

1. Allen Clarke
2. Ciaran Clarke
3. Peter Clohessy
4. David Corkery
5. Reggie Corrigan
6. Victor Costello
7. Kieron Dawson
8. Eric Elwood
9. Gabriel Fulcher
10. Mick Galwey
11. Rob Henderson
12. Denis Hickie
13. David Humphreys
14. Paddy Johns
15. Killian Keane
16. Kevin Maggs
17. Mark McCall
18. Conor McGuinness
19. Stephen McIvor
20. Eric Miller
21. Ross Nesdale
22. Malcolm O'Kelly
23. Brian O'Meara
24. Conor O'Shea
25. Nick Popplewell
26. Paul Wallace
27. Richard Wallace
28. Andy Ward
29. Keith Wood (c.)

== Scotland ==
Head Coach: Jim Telfer

1. Gary Armstrong (c.)
2. Gordon Bulloch
3. Paul Burnell
4. Craig Chalmers
5. Damian Cronin
6. Graham Ellis
7. Hugh Gilmour
8. George Graham
9. Stuart Grimes
10. David Hilton
11. Simon Holmes
12. Craig Joiner
13. Derrick Lee
14. Kenny Logan
15. Shaun Longstaff
16. Cameron Murray
17. Andy Nicol
18. Eric Peters
19. Budge Pountney
20. Adam Roxburgh
21. Rowen Shepherd
22. Ian Smith
23. Tony Stanger
24. Mattie Stewart
25. Alan Tait
26. Gregor Townsend
27. Rob Wainwright
28. Peter Walton
29. Doddie Weir
30. Peter Wright

== Wales ==
Head Coach: Kevin Bowring

1. Rob Appleyard
2. Allan Bateman
3. Neil Boobyer
4. Colin Charvis
5. Leigh Davies
6. Stuart Davies
7. Scott Gibbs
8. Byron Hayward
9. Rob Howley (c.)
10. Jonathan Humphreys
11. Dafydd James
12. Garin Jenkins
13. Neil Jenkins
14. Paul John
15. Kingsley Jones
16. Andrew Lewis
17. Gareth Llewellyn
18. Andy Moore
19. Kevin Morgan
20. Lyndon Mustoe
21. Wayne Proctor
22. Scott Quinnell
23. Stuart Roy
24. Chris Stephens
25. Arwel Thomas
26. Gareth Thomas
27. Mike Voyle
28. Nigel Walker
29. Barry Williams
30. Martyn Williams
31. David Young
