= Roland Reed =

Roland Reed may refer to:

- Roland D. Reed (1894–1972), American film editor, producer and director
- Roland W. Reed (1864–1934), American photographer

== See also ==
- Roland Reid (born 1978) Scottish rugby union player
