= Carlo di Ciacca =

Scottish rugby union player

- Born: Carlo di Ciacca; 1 November 1977 (age 49) Scotland
- Height: 6 ft 1 in (1.85 m)
- Weight: 103 kg (16 st 3 lb)
- School: St Aloysius' College, Glasgow
- University: Glasgow Caledonian University

Rugby union career
- Position: Hooker
Amateur team(s)
Years	Team	Apps	(Points)
- West of Scotland
–	Glasgow Hutchesons Aloysians		
Senior career
Years	Team	Apps	(Points)
2000-01	Glasgow Warriors	2	(0)
2001-04	Edinburgh Rugby		
International career
Years	Team	Apps	(Points)
- Scotland U21
–	Scotland A		

Carlo di Ciacca (born 1 November 1977 in Scotland) is a Scottish former rugby union player who played for Glasgow Warriors at the Hooker position.

== Rugby Union career ==
=== Amateur career ===
Educated at St Aloysius' College, Glasgow, he played for West of Scotland at amateur level and eventually captained the team, before being called in the Glasgow Warriors squad in season 2000-01.

After leaving Edinburgh in 2004, di Ciacca signed for Glasgow Hutchesons Aloysians RFC.

=== Professional career ===
Di Ciacca said of the Glasgow move: "One moment I was psyching myself up to lead West against Edinburgh Accies in Division Two. The next I was thrown in the deep end against one of the best teams in Europe. My ambition is to become a full-time professional and it has been important to get my foot in the door."

He played twice in the Heineken Cup for Glasgow.

He later signed for Edinburgh Rugby for season 2001-02 and played for them till 2004. He made his first competitive start for Edinburgh in January 2002.

=== International career ===
He played internationally for Scotland A.

== Hospitality career ==
He studied hospitality at Glasgow Caledonian University. Since 2007 he has been the owner of the Amaretto restaurant in Bridge of Weir, Renfrewshire.
