= Strathendrick RFC =

Scottish rugby union club, based in Fintry, Stirlingshire

(Scotland) Strathendrick Rugby Football Club
- Full name: Strathendrick Rugby Football Club
- Union: Scottish Rugby Union
- Nickname: Endrick
- Founded: 1975; 51 years ago
- Location: Fintry, Scotland
- Ground(s): Ruth Menzies Field, Fintry
- President: (Scotland) William Kay
- Coach: (New Zealand) Eddie Roche
- Captain: (Scotland) Stephen Taylor
- League: West Division One
- 2024–25: West Division Two, 1st of 10 (promoted)
Team kit

Official website
- www.pitchero.com/clubs/strathendrickrfc/

Strathendrick RFC is a rugby union side based in Fintry, Stirlingshire. The 1st XV play in West Division One.

== History ==
The club was founded in 1975.

It has a tradition of touring; and it has toured in Kansas (1992) and Toronto (2001).

They have an active mini and midi set up which works closely with the local primary schools and the local high school, Balfron High School.

== Ties with Aberystwyth ==
The club plays an annual match with Aberystwyth RFC.

The 1987 clash when the Welsh club took its turn to visit Strathendrick was notable.

The local newspaper The Stirling Observer of 20 March 1987 noted this in the match's build-up:

On Friday of this week, Strathendrick renew their association with Aberystwyth who are staying at Fintry for two days prior to the Murrayfield match. The Welsh club, captained by former England cap Mark Keyworth, are very experienced but Endrick hope to provide an entertaining contest.

However Keyworth did not play in the match, and Brian Isaac captained the Welsh side. From The Stirling Observer of 27 March 1987:

The annual reunion match between Aberystwyth and Strathendrick rugby clubs took place last week. Most of the events from a memorable weekend will go unreported but Endrick's club records will proudly show Friday's 14-3 win over not inconsiderable opposition. Scott Mitchell came in for Gary Heron who sustained a rib injury in mid week.
The home side went ahead when Ken Hendry kicked a 35 yard penalty. Exchanges were fairly even until midway through the first half when Graeme Mitchell powered over for an unconverted try. In the closing minutes of the first half Endrick added a second try from a scrum. The visitors won their own ball but a mighty shove drove them off it and Robert Morrison touched down. Aberystwyth got on the scoresheet from the restart when Gary Williams kicked a 30 yard penalty. Despite a number of close calls at each end the only score in that period was another penalty from the boot of Ken Hendry.

Aberystwyth: G. Williams, M. Beechley, E. Watts, K. Phillips, K. Griffiths, T. Lewis, G. Thomas, D. Gwynne, B. Isaac (captain), E. Evans, A. Jones, H. Rees, T. Rees, G. Lewis, C. Thomas.
Strathendrick: I. Somerville, C. Kerr, G. Mitchell, K. McNeilis, R. Mair, K. Hendry, I. Ross, K. Gilgour, G. Gilfillan, R. Simpson, S. Campbell, G. Yuill, R. Telfer, R. Morrison (captain), S. Mitchell.

The referee was Mr. Ian Douglas.

== Sevens ==
The club runs the Strathendrick Sevens tournament.

== Notable players – past and present ==
- (Scotland) Stewart Campbell (Former Scottish International Rugby Player 1995–1998)
- Rory Kerr (three caps for Scotland)
- Colin Gregor (Former Scotland's 7s Captain, most capped Scotland 7s player)

== Honours ==
- Glasgow Warriors Community Hero of the Year 2022–23
  - Steven McCooey
