= Scott Hutton =

- Born: Scott Hutton Lochwinnoch, Scotland
- University: Glasgow University

Rugby union career
- Position: Lock
Amateur team(s)
Years	Team	Apps	(Points)
- Glasgow High Kelvinside
–	Glasgow Hawks		
–	Old Belvedere		
Senior career
Years	Team	Apps	(Points)
1997-2001	Glasgow Warriors	1	(0)
International career
Years	Team	Apps	(Points)
2000	Barbarians	1	(0)

Scott Hutton is a Scottish rugby union footballer who played professionally for Glasgow Warriors, and at amateur level for Glasgow High Kelvinside, Glasgow Hawks and Irish side Old Belvedere. His regular playing position is lock.

Hutton played for Glasgow High Kelvinside before its merger with Glasgow Academicals formed the Hawks.

When Glasgow Hawks was formed in 1997, Hutton began playing for them, winning their first Scottish Cup in 1998. He was captain of the amateur club Glasgow Hawks from 1999-2001. After his captaincy, he also played for Hawks in 2002 and 2003.

He studied law at Glasgow University from 1992 to 1997.

Hutton was in the professional provincial Glasgow side from 1997 to 2000. He played for Glasgow against a touring Brumbies side in 1997. He also came on as a substitute in a competitive match in the Welsh-Scottish League in the 2000-01 season, when he played against Swansea RFC in the last match of that season.

He played for the Barbarians against Germany in 2000.

In 2006, Hutton was playing for Irish amateur side Old Belvedere. and captained the team in 2006-2007.

Scott is now based in Dubai and a Partner in the Law Firm Squire Patton Boggs there.

He was the club captain of the Dubai Exiles Rugby Club. He is involved with the charity Finding Your Feet, founded after his sister Corinne developed septicaemia and had a quadruple amputation; her hands and feet.

For another charity, Hutton was in the Bill McLaren Foundation team that played against United Arab Emirates in 2013.
