= Graeme Young =

NZ/Scottish rugby union player

- Born: Graeme Young Dunedin, New Zealand
- University: University of Otago

Rugby union career
- Position: Scrum-half
Amateur team(s)
Years	Team	Apps	(Points)
-	Poneke		
–	Southern		
–	Stirling County		
Senior career
Years	Team	Apps	(Points)
2000–01	Glasgow Warriors	1	(0)
Provincial / State sides
Years	Team	Apps	(Points)
1990–2000	Otago		
-	Wellington		
Coaching career
- Years: Team
- 2008–2011: Stirling County (Asst.)
- 2011–15: Stirling County
- 2015–2017: Scotland Women (Asst.)

Graeme Young (born Dunedin, New Zealand) is a former New Zealand born Scottish rugby union player and now coach who played for Glasgow Warriors and Stirling County at the Scrum-half position. He has coached Stirling County, Scotland Women and the Scotland Cub XV.

== Rugby Union career ==
=== Amateur career ===
His parents both are Scottish – and Young emigrated to Scotland from New Zealand in 2000. He played for the Poneke club in Wellington before moving to Scotland. Young played for amateur club Stirling County from 2000 Captaining the club to the Scottish Division Two championship

=== Provincial career ===
In New Zealand he represented the Otago and Wellington provinces.

=== Professional career ===
He made one appearance for the professional provincial side Glasgow Warriors; in the season 2000-01. Coming on as a replacement for Chris Black at scrum-half in 71 minutes, he turned out for Glasgow at Hughenden in a Welsh-Scottish League match against Cross Keys RFC on 2 September 2000. Glasgow won the match 52 – 28.

=== Coaching career ===
Young coached Stirling County from 2008, becoming head coach in 2011 leading the club to their highest league position in 17 years of 3rd place and back to back qualification for the British & Irish Cup. He remained there till 2015.

He left Stirling and became an assistant coach with the Scotland women's national rugby union team who secured their first Six Nations victories in 7 seasons defeating Wales and Italy.

An HR manager professionally he has worked for media group Sky, Tesco Bank and as a Rugby Development Officer for Clackmannanshire Council. He currently Heads up Heathrow Airport's People Services function.
