= Chris Black (rugby union) =

Scottish rugby union player

- Born: Christopher Henderson Black; 17 February 1978 (age 48) Dundee, Scotland
- Height: 6 ft 1 in (1.85 m)
- Weight: 92 kg (14 st 7 lb)
- School: Carnoustie High School
- University: Heriot-Watt University

Rugby union career
- Position: Scrum-half
Amateur team(s)
Years	Team	Apps	(Points)
- Dundee HSFP
–	Watsonians		
–	Boroughmuir		
–	Morgan Academy RFC		
Senior career
Years	Team	Apps	(Points)
2000-03	Glasgow Warriors	8	(0)
International career
Years	Team	Apps	(Points)
- Scotland U19

Chris Black (born 17 February 1978 in Dundee, Scotland) is a former Scotland Under 19 international rugby union player who played for Glasgow Warriors at the Scrum-half position.

Black started out playing rugby union with Dundee HSFP.

He then moved to Watsonians.

He was called into the Glasgow Warriors squad for the season 2000-01. He played in the Pro12 and in the Heineken Cup for the club. When not in use with the provincial side he turned out for Boroughmuir. He was released by Glasgow in 2003, after an injury-hit season.

Black later joined Morgan Academy RFC.

Black now works in the oil industry as the Chief Operating Officer for JAB recruitment. He now stays in Carnoustie and coaches his local rugby team.
