= Australian Barbarians =

Rugby union team in Australia

Australian Barbarians Rugby
- Logo of the Australian Barbarians
- Union: Rugby Australia
- Nickname: Baa-Baas
- Emblem: Australian Merino
- Founded: 1957; 69 years ago
Team kit

The Australian Barbarians, nicknamed the Baa-Baas, is an Australian invitational rugby union team that has been a major part of Australian rugby since the team was founded in 1957. The club is based in Australia. The idea came from the concept of the Barbarian F.C. formed in Great Britain in 1890.

== History ==
Founded in 1957, the Australian Barbarians was envisioned as an invitational side built off the original concept of the Barbarian F.C. side, adding opportunity for players to play against international touring sides, similar to other corresponding sides in other nations like the New Zealand Barbarians, South African Barbarians and French Barbarians, with all programs continuing into the era of professionalism. Following their inception, the Australian Barbarians featured in several tours, with fixtures against the All Blacks, Western Samoa, France, Scotland and Fiji, plus fixtures against development sides from England and Canada.

In 1999 the The Sydney Morning Herald reported that the Australian Rugby Union (ARU) reached an agreement with the Barbarians in 1997 to establish the team as Australia's "second XV", positioned immediately below the Wallabies and, in effect, assuming the representative role of the Australia A side. The decision was approved by the ARU Board and recorded in the Board minutes under the agenda item "Australian Barbarians". Throughout the late 90s and early 2000s, the Australian Barbarians featured more Test players in the team for their fixtures than previous iterations of the team, including eight Test players in a match against Fiji in 1999.

In 2010, the Australian Barbarians team was nominated by the Australian Rugby Union (ARU) as the second national team to play two matches against England during their 2010 tour of Australia. They also played a pre-Rugby World Cup warm-up match against a Canada XV side in 2011.

Several junior Barbarians sides have also been produced for both domestic and international fixtures. An Australian Barbarians U20s side has also been produced, with their most recent clash taking place in 2015 defeating Tonga U20s 40–36. The program was revived in 2015 following the completion of the second season of the National Rugby Championship, with players from the competition who were not contracted for Super Rugby embarking on a two-match tour of New Zealand against a side chosen from the Heartland Championship, named the New Zealand Heartland XV. The Barbarians won both fixtures.

After several years playing domestic fixtures, 2022 marked the first ever female Australian Barbarians clash, with the side playing an international fixture against Japan as part of their tour against the Australia women's national rugby union team. Japan won the fixture, 10–24.

The team was revived again in 2025 to play their first-ever fixture against a Japan Development XV, the secondary feeder team to the Japan national rugby union team as part of the Coffs Coast Festival of Rugby in Coffs Harbour, New South Wales.

== International results ==
Matches against international teams only. (Note: Trial matches against the Australian U20 side, and other age-group teams, to assist in their preparation for international tournaments have also been played by the Australian Barbarians Rugby Club, but these results are not listed here.) The listing may be incomplete.

Date	Venue	Opponent	Score	Competition	Refs
17 June 1957	North Sydney Oval, Sydney	New Zealand	6–23	1957 New Zealand tour of Australia	
4 June 1958	Sydney Sports Ground, Sydney	New Zealand Māori	8–38	1958 New Zealand Māori tour of Australia	
25 July 1991	Manly Oval, Sydney	Western Samoa	24–36	1991 Western Samoa tour of Australia	
25 June 1997	Topper Stadium, Newcastle	France	26–24	1997 France tour of Australia	
9 June 1998	Penrith Stadium, Penrith	Scotland	39–34	1998 Scotland tour of Oceania	
10 July 1999	Olympic Park Stadium, Melbourne	New Zealand A	33–24	1999 New Zealand A tour of Australia	
28 August 1999	North Sydney Oval, Sydney	Fiji	31–25	1999 Fiji tour of Australia	
8 June 2010	Subiaco Oval, Perth	England XV	28–28	2010 England tour of Australasia	
19 June 2010	Central Coast Stadium, Gosford	England XV	9–15	2010 England tour of Australasia	
26 August 2011	Robina Stadium, Gold Coast	Canada XV	38–14	2011 Rugby World Cup warm-up match	
10 November 2015	Levin Domain, Levin	New Zealand Heartland XV	38–32	2015 Australian Barbarians tour of New Zealand	(Note: Players from the National Rugby Championship (NRC) that were not contracted for Super Rugby were selected to play against a New Zealand side chosen from the Heartland Championship.)
13 November 2015	Cooks Gardens, Wanganui	New Zealand Heartland XV	40–24	2015 Australian Barbarians tour of New Zealand	(Note: Players from the National Rugby Championship (NRC) that were not contracted for Super Rugby were selected to play against a New Zealand side chosen from the Heartland Championship.)
5 April 2025	Coffs Harbour International Stadium, Coffs Harbour	Japan Development XV	31–43	Coffs Coast Festival of Rugby	

== See also ==
- New Zealand Barbarians
- South African Barbarians
