= 1998–99 European Challenge Cup pool stage =

- Season: 1998–99 European Challenge Cup
- Date: 19 September 1998 – 11 November 1998

Qualifiers

The pool stage of the 1998–99 European Challenge Cup.

== Pool stage ==
=== Pool 1 ===
Team	P	W	D	L	Tries for	Tries against	Try diff	Points for	Points against	Points diff	Pts
(France) Narbonne	6	6	0	0	32	13	+19	228	98	+130	12
(Wales) Caerphilly	6	4	0	2	16	19	−3	167	154	+13	8
(France) Périgueux	6	3	0	3	23	13	+10	168	119	+49	6
Racing Club de France	6	3	0	3	17	23	−6	127	184	−57	6
(Ireland) Connacht	6	3	0	3	16	19	−3	129	156	−27	6
(Wales) Newport	6	1	0	5	14	23	−9	123	183	−60	2
(Italy) Rugby Rovigo	6	1	0	5	12	20	−8	108	156	−48	2

19 September 1998
14:30

Caerphilly (Wales)	31–28	(France) Périgueux

Virginia Park
Attendance: 1,500

19 September 1998
20:00

Narbonne (France)	41–17	(Italy) Rugby Rovigo

Parc des Sports et de l'Amitié

20 September 1998
17:00

Racing Club de France	37–21	(Wales) Newport

Stade Yves du Manoir, Paris
Attendance: 300

26 September 1998
14:30

Newport (Wales)	12–31	(Ireland) Connacht

Rodney Parade
Attendance: 655

26 September 1998
17:00

Périgueux (France)	40–18	Racing Club de France

Stade Municipal
Attendance: 2,300

27 September 1998
16:00

Rugby Rovigo (Italy)	34–14	(Wales) Caerphilly

Stadio Mario Battaglini
Attendance: 1,500

7 October 1998
14:30

Connacht (Ireland)	29–28	(France) Périgueux

The Sports Ground
Attendance: 1,000

7 October 1998
19:15

Caerphilly (Wales)	17–34	(France) Narbonne

Virginia Park
Attendance: 700

7 October 1998
20:00

Racing Club de France	28–12	(Italy) Rugby Rovigo

Stade Yves du Manoir, Paris
Attendance: 200

11 October 1998
15:00

Narbonne (France)	66–5	Racing Club de France

Parc des Sports et de l'Amitié
Attendance: 1,500

11 October 1998
15:00

Périgueux (France)	31–16	(Wales) Newport

Stade Municipal
Attendance: 2,000

11 October 1998
15:30

Rugby Rovigo (Italy)	20–21	(Ireland) Connacht

Stadio Mario Battaglini
Attendance: 1,200

17 October 1998
14:30

Connacht (Ireland)	26–38	(France) Narbonne

The Sports Ground
Attendance: 2,500

17 October 1998
14:30

Newport (Wales)	27–18	(Italy) Rugby Rovigo

Rodney Parade
Attendance: 1,100

18 October 1998
15:00

Racing Club de France	20–31	(Wales) Caerphilly

Stade Yves du Manoir, Paris 200

31 October 1998
14:30

Caerphilly (Wales)	39–8	(Ireland) Connacht

Virginia Park
Attendance: 600

31 October 1998
14:30

Rugby Rovigo (Italy)	7–25	(France) Périgueux

Stadio Mario Battaglini
Attendance: 1,000

31 October 1998
20:00

Narbonne (France)	31–17	(Wales) Newport

Parc des Sports et de l'Amitié
Attendance: 3,000

7 November 1998
14:30

Connacht (Ireland)	14–19	Racing Club de France

The Sports Ground
Attendance: 500

7 November 1998
14:30

Newport (Wales)	30–35	(Wales) Caerphilly

Rodney Parade
Attendance: 2,500

7 November 1998
19:30

Périgueux (France)	16–18	(France) Narbonne

Stade Municipal
Attendance: 2,000

=== Pool 2 ===
Team	P	W	D	L	Tries for	Tries against	Try diff	Points for	Points against	Points diff	Pts
(France) Montferrand	6	5	0	1	43	9	+34	303	86	+217	10
(France) Bourgoin	6	5	0	1	36	8	+28	222	86	+136	10
(France) Dax	6	5	0	1	20	15	+5	163	124	+39	10
(France) Castres	6	3	0	3	32	10	+22	229	101	+128	6
(Italy) Rugby Roma	6	2	0	4	14	34	−20	117	213	−96	4
(Wales) Aberavon	6	1	0	5	14	42	−28	86	287	−201	2
Spain XV	6	0	0	6	7	48	−41	65	288	−223	0

19 September 1998
20:00

Bourgoin (France)	55–10	Spain XV

Stade Pierre Rajon
Attendance: 4,000

19 September 1998
20:00

Castres (France)	87–10	(Wales) Aberavon

Stade Pierre Antoine
Attendance: 2,500

20 September 1998
17:00

Rugby Roma (Italy)	18–25	(France) Dax

Stadio Tre Fontane
Attendance: 1,800

26 September 1998
14:30

Aberavon (Wales)	12–30	(Italy) Rugby Roma

Talbot Athletic Ground
Attendance: 600

26 September 1998
17:00

Spain XV	15–61	(France) Castres

Kenmare
Attendance: 2,500

26 September 1998
19:30

Dax (France)	24–22	(France) Montferrand

Stade Maurice Boyau
Attendance: 3,500

4 October 1998
14:00

Rugby Roma (Italy)	25–21	Spain XV

Stadio Tre Fontane
Attendance: 1,000

7 October 1998
19:00

Montferrand (France)	97–13	(Wales) Aberavon

Stade Marcel Michelin
Attendance: 1,500

7 October 1998
20:00

Castres (France)	9–30	(France) Bourgoin

Stade Pierre Antoine
Attendance: 2,000

10 October 1998
14:30

Aberavon (Wales)	28–41	(France) Dax

Talbot Athletic Ground
Attendance: 1,000

10 October 1998
16:00

Spain XV	13–88	(France) Montferrand

Kenmare
Attendance: 1,000

10 October 1998
20:00

Bourgoin (France)	50–22	(Italy) Rugby Roma

Stade Pierre Rajon
Attendance: 3,000

17 October 1998
19:30

Dax (France)	41–0	Spain XV

Stade Maurice Boyau

17 October 1998
20:00

Montferrand (France)	23–14	(France) Bourgoin

Stade Marcel Michelin
Attendance: 5,000

18 October 1998
16:30

Rugby Roma (Italy)	15–48	(France) Castres

Stadio Tre Fontane
Attendance: 2,000

31 October 1998
17:00

Spain XV	6–18	(Wales) Aberavon

El Ferol
Attendance: 4,000

31 October 1998
18:00

Bourgoin (France)	47–17	(France) Dax

Stade Pierre Rajon
Attendance: 3,000

31 October 1998
19:30

Castres (France)	15–16	(France) Montferrand

Stade Pierre Antoine
Attendance: 5,000

7 November 1998
14:30

Aberavon (Wales)	5–26	(France) Bourgoin

Talbot Athletic Ground
Attendance: 800

7 November 1998
19:30

Dax (France)	15–9	(France) Castres

Stade Maurice Boyau
Attendance: 3,000

11 November 1998
18:00

Montferrand (France)	57–7	(Italy) Rugby Roma

Stade Marcel Michelin
Attendance: 5,000

=== Pool 3 ===
Team	P	W	D	L	Tries for	Tries against	Try diff	Points for	Points against	Points diff	Pts
(France) Brive	6	5	0	1	35	14	+21	241	102	+139	10
(France) Agen	6	4	0	2	30	11	+19	231	93	+138	8
(France) Pau	6	4	0	2	25	8	+17	211	87	+124	8
(France) Biarritz	6	4	0	2	30	14	+16	187	124	+63	8
(Wales) Bridgend RFC	6	2	0	4	19	28	−9	158	206	−48	4
(Romania) Dinamo București	6	2	0	4	19	31	−12	131	246	−115	4
Portugal XV	6	0	0	6	8	60	−52	73	374	−301	0

19 September 1998
19:45

Brive (France)	31–22	(France) Biarritz

Stadium Municipal, Brive
Attendance: 5,000

19 September 1998
14:30

Bridgend (Wales)	17–32	(France) Agen

Brewery Field
Attendance: 700

20 September 1998
14:30

Dinamo-București (Romania)	22–31	(France) Pau

Timișoara
Attendance: 400

25 September 1998
20:00

Pau (France)	37–3	(France) Biarritz

Stade Municipal du Hameau
Attendance: 7,000

26 September 1998
14:30

Dinamo-București (Romania)	45–43	(Wales) Bridgend

Timișoara
Attendance: 3,000

26 September 1998
17:00

Portugal XV	7–85	(France) Brive

Estadio Universitario de Liboa
Attendance: 1,800

7 October 1998
19:15

Bridgend (Wales)	45–24	Portugal XV

Brewery Field
Attendance: 1,400

7 October 1998
20:00

Biarritz (France)	10–9	(France) Agen

Parc des Sports Aguilera
Attendance: 1,000

7 October 1998
20:30

Brive (France)	26–9	(France) Pau

Stadium Municipal, Brive
Attendance: 6,000

10 October 1998
19:00

Pau (France)	45–21	(Wales) Bridgend

Stade Municipal du Hameau
Attendance: 3,000

10 October 1998
19:00

Portugal XV	18–23	(Romania) Dinamo-București

Estadio Universitario de Liboa
Attendance: 800

11 October 1998
15:00

Agen (France)	34–35	(France) Brive

Stade Armandie
Attendance: 3,000

17 October 1998
20:00

Agen (France)	15–11	(France) Pau

Stade Armandie
Attendance: 3,500

17 October 1998
20:00

Biarritz (France)	62–11	Portugal XV

Parc des Sports Aguilera
Attendance: 1,000

18 October 1998
19:45

Brive (France)	49–10	(Romania) Dinamo-București

Stadium Municipal, Brive
Attendance: 5,000

31 October 1998
18:00

Pau (France)	78–0	Portugal XV

Stade Municipal du Hameau
Attendance: 3,000

31 October 1998
20:00

Agen (France)	60–7	(Romania) Dinamo-București

Stade Armandie
Attendance: 3,000

31 October 1998
20:00

Biarritz (France)	45–12	(Wales) Bridgend

Parc des Sports Aguilera
Attendance: 1,000

7 November 1998
14:30

Bridgend (Wales)	20–15	(France) Brive

Brewery Field
Attendance: 1,500

7 November 1998
14:30

Dinamo-București (Romania)	24–45	(France) Biarritz

Timișoara
Attendance: 2,000

7 November 1998
16:00

Portugal XV	13–81	(France) Agen

Estadio Universitario de Liboa
Attendance: 1,500

== See also ==
- European Challenge Cup
- 1998–99 Heineken Cup
