= Alan Watt (rugby union) =

Scotland international rugby union player

- Born: Alan Gordon James Watt; 10 July 1967 (age 59) Glasgow, Scotland
- Height: 6 ft 5 in (1.96 m)
- Weight: 20 st 0 lb (127 kg)
- School: Kelvinside Academy

Rugby union career
- Position: Prop
Amateur team(s)
Years	Team	Apps	(Points)
1986-96	Glasgow High Kelvinside		
1996-99	Currie RFC		
2000	Hillhead Jordanhill		
Senior career
Years	Team	Apps	(Points)
1999-2001	Glasgow Warriors	21	(3)
Provincial / State sides
Years	Team	Apps	(Points)
- Glasgow District
International career
Years	Team	Apps	(Points)
- Scotland U16
1991	Scotland 'B'		
1991-93	Scotland		

Alan Watt (born 10 July 1967) is a former Scotland national rugby union team international rugby union player. He played for Glasgow High Kelvinside, Currie and Hillhead Jordanhill - as well as Glasgow Warriors.

== Rugby Union career ==
=== Amateur career ===
Watt born in Glasgow. He went to school at Kelvinside Academy.

Watt played prop for Glasgow High Kelvinside. He moved to Currie in 1996.

In 2000, while still contracted to Glasgow Warriors, he was assigned to Hillhead Jordanhill RFC.

=== Provincial and professional career ===
Before turning professional, Watt played for the provincial Glasgow District side.

He was signed in 1999 by Glasgow Warriors, then as Glasgow Caledonians.

His competitive debut for the Warriors was on 3 September 1999 at home to Pontypridd RFC in the Welsh–Scottish League. The Warriors played that match at Bridgehaugh Park in Stirling. Watt has the Glasgow Warriors No. 69.

Despite 20 competitive appearances for Caledonians, he was released by them in March 2001.

=== International career ===
He played wing-forward for Scottish Schools in 1984.

He was capped by Scotland 'B' to play against France 'B' on 2 March 1991.

He made his international senior debut at Murrayfield against Zimbabwe during the group stages of the 1991 Rugby World Cup. His final international appearance was against Argentina at Buenos Aires in 1994.
