= Colin Stewart (rugby union) =

Scottish rugby union player

- Born: Colin Stewart; 6 January 1980 (age 46) Bellshill, Scotland
- Height: 2.01 m (6 ft 7 in)
- Weight: 118 kg (18 st 8 lb)
- School: Duncanrig Secondary School

Rugby union career
- Position: Lock
Amateur team(s)
Years	Team	Apps	(Points)
–	East Kilbride RFC		
2002-06	Selkirk RFC		
2006-09	Plymouth Albion		
2011-present	Newton Abbot		
Senior career
Years	Team	Apps	(Points)
2000-02	Glasgow Warriors	21	(0)
2002-06	Border Reivers		
2009-11	Tarbes Pyrénées Rugby	57	(0)
International career
Years	Team	Apps	(Points)
- Scotland U19
–	Scotland U21		
Coaching career
- Years: Team
- Newton Abbot (Player-Coach)

Colin Stewart (born 6 January 1980 in Bellshill, Scotland) is a former Scotland Under 21 international rugby union player who played with Glasgow Warriors and Border Reivers. His regular playing position was Lock.

Starting off playing mini-rugby, Stewart began his rugby career playing for East Kilbride RFC. His potential was spotted by the Glasgow District Rugby Union and he was selected as one of the Glasgow Thistle squad - then essentially an academy squad for Glasgow Warriors - that would receive rugby training in the summer of 1998 in New Zealand. The training was under the ex-Glasgow Warriors boss Kevin Greene.

In the season 2000-01 he formally joined Glasgow.

For the 2002-03 season Stewart joined Border Reivers. While he was not in action for the Reivers, Stewart played for Selkirk RFC.

In 2006 he moved to England to play for Plymouth Albion.

He moved to play in France in 2009, where he played for Tarbees Pyrennes. He played 57 times for the French club in two seasons.

After playing in France he returned to south-west England in 2011, where he now plays and coaches Newton Abbot.

He is also Head of the Rugby Academy at South Devon College. He has set up a Rugby 4 Kids programme to promote rugby to the under 7s.

Stewart played for Scotland U19 and Scotland U21.
