= Don Kitchenbrand =

South African soccer player (1933–2025)

Personal information
- Full name: Donald Basil Kitchenbrand
- Date of birth: 13 August 1933
- Place of birth: Germiston, South Africa
- Date of death: March 2025 (aged 91)
- Position: Forward

Senior career*
Years	Team	Apps	(Gls)
1950	Boksburg		
1951–1955	Delfos		
1955–1958	Rangers	30	(26)
1958–1960	Sunderland	53	(28)
1960	Johannesburg Ramblers		
1960	Vereeniging Athletic		
1961–1962	Johannesburg Wanderers		
1962–1963	Forfar Athletic	9	(6)
1963	Keith	5	(2)
Total		91+	(60+)

International career
1956	South Africa XI	1	(0)
- * Club domestic league appearances and goals

Donald Basil Kitchenbrand (also Kichenbrand; 13 August 1933 – March 2025) was a South African football player who played in Britain for Rangers and Sunderland in the mid to late 1950s.

== Career ==
Nicknamed The Rhino by the club's fans, Kitchenbrand was one of very few players of the Catholic faith to play for Rangers between the 1920s and 1980s, between which times an unwritten rule was in effect; he was advised not to disclose his religion when signing. In his first season in British football (1955–56), he scored 24 goals in 25 league appearances to help Rangers win the Scottish League title. That goal tally included the only goal in a 1–0 win over Old Firm rivals Celtic on 2 January 1956, and a five-goal haul in an 8–0 rout of Queen of the South at Ibrox on 7 March 1956. Kitchenbrand did not feature much for Rangers after that first season, having lost his place in the side to Max Murray, and left for Sunderland in March 1958.

Kitchenbrand played 54 competitive games for Sunderland, scoring 28 goals. In November 1958 he scored a hat-trick in a 4–0 win over Rotherham, the first hat-trick a Sunderland player had achieved in two years.

He returned to his homeland in 1960 to play for Johannesburg Wanderers and a number of other teams, before coming back to Scotland two years later for a brief spell at Forfar Athletic.

Kitchenbrand played once for his country in March 1956, featuring in a South Africa representative side all consisting of British-based players and including Kitchenbrand's Rangers team-mate Johnny Hubbard. They played against a Scotland XI at Ibrox, losing 2–1.

== Personal life and death ==
As of 2019, Kitchenbrand and his wife were living in an elderly persons' complex in Benoni, Gauteng. On 16 March 2025, it was announced that Kitchenbrand had died at the age of 91.

== Honours ==
Rangers

- Scottish League: 1955–56
