= Adam Roxburgh =

Scotland international rugby union player & coach

- Born: Adam John Roxburgh; 14 April 1970 (age 56) Edinburgh, Scotland
- Height: 6 ft 2 in (1.88 m)
- Weight: 15 st 6 lb (98 kg)

Rugby union career
- Position: Flanker
Senior career
Years	Team	Apps	(Points)
-1996	Kelso		
1996-	Border Reivers		
–	Kelso		
International career
Years	Team	Apps	(Points)
1997–1998	Scotland	8	(0)
Coaching career
- Years: Team
- 2015-: Kelso

Adam Roxburgh (born 14 April 1970) is a rugby union coach and former player who made eight appearances for the Scotland national rugby union team. He was known for his entertaining play in rugby sevens games.

== Early life ==
Roxburgh was born in Edinburgh.

== Rugby playing career ==
He played club rugby for Kelso RFC.

He made his international rugby debut on 22 November 1997, against Australia at Murrayfield. His last appearance was against Australia at Brisbane during the 1998 Scotland rugby union tour of Oceania.

Roxburgh was a talented rugby sevens player. With Kelso he competed in the Dubai Sevens, 1993 Rugby World Cup Sevens and has won three Kings of the Sevens. In 1997, he won the Middlesex Sevens with the Barbarians.

When many of his rugby-playing contemporaries turned professional in 1997, Roxburgh remained with the firm of precision tool makers, Abbey Tool and Gauge in Kelso, who had been his first employer from school. He retired from club rugby in 2005.

== Coaching ==
By 2008 he was coaching the Kelso sevens team and the Kelso second fifteen. He took over as a head coach at Kelso from 2015.
