= Alan Bulloch =

Scotland international rugby union player

Alan Bulloch pen
- Born: Alan Bulloch; 7 July 1977 (age 49) Glasgow, Scotland
- Height: 5 ft 8 in (1.73 m)
- Weight: 89 kg (14 st 0 lb)
- School: Hutchesons' Grammar School
- Notable relative(s): Gordon Bulloch, brother

Rugby union career
- Position: Centre
Amateur team(s)
Years	Team	Apps	(Points)
2004 - 2008	GHA RFC	79	(105)
Senior career
Years	Team	Apps	(Points)
1996–2004	Glasgow Warriors	111	(120)
International career
Years	Team	Apps	(Points)
2000–2001	Scotland	5	(0)

Alan James Bulloch (born 7 July 1977) is a Scottish former rugby union player who gained five international caps at centre.

== Early life ==
Bulloch was born on 7 July 1977 in Glasgow, Scotland. He was educated at Hutchesons' Grammar School and played for the Scottish schools team at centre.

== Rugby Union career ==
=== Amateur career ===
He played for Glasgow Hutchesons Aloysians.

=== Professional career ===
When the game turned professional in 1996 he signed for Glasgow Rugby, now Glasgow Warriors.

As the Centre named for Warriors first match as a professional team - against Newbridge in the European Challenge Cup - Bulloch has the distinction of being given Glasgow Warrior No. 13 for the provincial side.

Two years later, Scotland's professional teams reorganised and the side was then named Glasgow Caledonians.

He retired from professional rugby in 2004 at the age of 26.

=== International career ===
He toured with Scotland in 1998 and 1999.

He made his debut for Scotland in an Autumn international against the United States at Murrayfield on 4 November 2000. The last of his five caps was a Six Nations match against England at Twickenham on 3 March 2001.

== Family ==
His brother Gordon Bulloch was also capped for Scotland.
