= Matt Proudfoot =

South African rugby union coach and Scotland international player

- Born: Matthew Craig Proudfoot; 30 January 1972 (age 54) Klerksdorp, South Africa
- Height: 1.85 m (6 ft 1 in)
- Weight: 150 kg (23 st 9 lb)
- School: Potchefstroom High School for Boys

Rugby union career
- Position: Prop
Amateur team(s)
Years	Team	Apps	(Points)
1997	Melrose RFC		
Senior career
Years	Team	Apps	(Points)
–	Edinburgh Rugby		
–	Leopards		
–	Blue Bulls		
2003-4	Glasgow Warriors	12	(0)
International career
Years	Team	Apps	(Points)
1997	Scotland A		
1998-2003	Scotland	4	(0)
Coaching career
- Years: Team
- –: North-West University (Forwards Coach)
- 2008-15: Western Province (Forwards Coach)
- 2009-15: Stormers (Forwards Coach)
- 2015-16: Kobelco Steelers (Asst)
- 2016-19: South Africa (Asst)
- 2020-22: England Men (Forwards Coach)
- 2023-24: Namibia (Forwards Coach)
- 2024-: Leopards

Matthew Proudfoot (born 30 January 1972) is a South African rugby union coach and former player who represented Scotland. He was the head coach of the Leopards until May 2025.

He was an assistant coach with South Africa, winning the 2019 World Cup. In January 2020 he became forwards coach for England, and left at the end of 2022. He had a coaching spell at Stellenbosch University before joining Namibia as their forwards coach for the 2023 Rugby World Cup.

He played for Glasgow Warriors and Edinburgh Rugby, and won four caps for Scotland between 1998 and 2003.

== Playing career ==
Hy played for DF Malan. Proudfoot played in the Vodacom Cup and then the Currie Cup for the Leopards after which he moved to Scotland to play for Melrose.

Proudfoot then played for Edinburgh Rugby. He won 3 international caps while with Edinburgh, before returning to South Africa.

Injury forced him into semi-retirement but he still played for the Leopards and the Blue Bulls. Glasgow Warriors coach Hugh Campbell persuaded him to return to full-time Scottish professional rugby.

In 2003 he returned to Scotland to play for Glasgow Warriors. He won 1 more international cap while with the Warriors.

=== International ===
He qualified for Scotland through his Dumfries grandfather. Despite being Scottish-South African, he speaks Afrikaans fluently,

He made his debut for Scotland in 1998 against Fiji. He was capped 4 times for the national team finishing with a cap against Ireland in 2003.

== Coaching career ==
Proudfoot coached the forwards at Western Province, Stormers, North-West University and Kobelco Steelers in Japan.

In May 2016 Proudfoot became an assistant coach with South Africa where he contributed to the Springboks winning the 2019 Rugby World Cup.

In January 2020 Proudfoot joined England as forwards coach ahead of the 2020 Six Nations.

He was appointed head coach of the Leopards in February 2024, until his replacement in May 2025.
