= Kevin McKenzie (rugby union) =

Scotland international rugby union player

- Born: Kevin McKenzie; 22 January 1968 (age 58) Stirling, Scotland
- Height: 168 cm (5 ft 6 in)
- Weight: 97 kg (15 st 4 lb)
- Notable relative(s): Mark McKenzie, brother

Rugby union career
- Position: Hooker
Amateur team(s)
Years	Team	Apps	(Points)
- Stirling County
Senior career
Years	Team	Apps	(Points)
1996-98	Caledonia Reds		
1998-99	Glasgow Warriors	6	(0)
Provincial / State sides
Years	Team	Apps	(Points)
- Glasgow District
International career
Years	Team	Apps	(Points)
1989	Scotland 'B'	1	(0)
1994-98	Scotland	14	(5)

Kevin Duncan McKenzie (born 22 January 1968, Stirling, Scotland) is a former Scotland international rugby union player.

== Rugby Union career ==
=== Amateur career ===
McKenzie played as a hooker.

He played for Stirling County.

=== Provincial and professional career ===
He played for Glasgow District when rugby union was an amateur game.

When rugby union was professionalised, McKenzie played for Caledonia Reds.

The Reds were disbanded in 1998, and McKenzie then played for Glasgow Warriors. He made his competitive debut for the professional Glasgow district on 13 September 1998, against Edinburgh Rugby at Easter Road in the Scottish Inter-District Championship. He became Glasgow Warrior No. 43.

=== International career ===
He was capped once for Scotland 'B' on 9 December 1989 against Ireland 'B'.

He was capped fourteen times for Scotland between 1994 and 1998, including the 1995 Rugby World Cup,

His only international try was at Lansdowne Road against Ireland on 20 January 1996.

== Family ==
His brother Mark McKenzie also played for Glasgow District, Stirling County, Caledonia Reds and Glasgow Warriors.
