= Craig Joiner =

Scotland international rugby union player

- Born: Craig Alexander Joiner; 21 April 1974 (age 52) Glasgow, Scotland
- Height: 1.78 m (5.8 ft)
- Weight: 90 kg (198 lb; 14 st 2 lb)
- School: Dunfermline High School; Merchiston Castle School
- University: Loughborough University

Rugby union career
- Position(s): Centre, wing
Senior career
Years	Team	Apps	(Points)
1993−1997	Melrose		
1997−2000	Leicester Tigers	41	(60)
2000−2005	Edinburgh	100	
2005−present	Stewart's Melville		
- Correct as of 1 November 2006
International career
Years	Team	Apps	(Points)
1994−2000	Scotland	25	(15)
- Correct as of 13 February 2007

Craig Joiner (born 21 April 1974) is a Scottish retired rugby union player who won 25 caps playing on the wing for the Scottish rugby union side between 1994 and 2000.

== Early life ==
Craig Joiner born on 21 April 1974 in Glasgow, Scotland. He was educated at Merchiston Castle School.

== Rugby career ==
He joined Leicester Tigers, and often played at outside centre, but returned to Scotland in 2000. He joined Stewart's Melville RFC in 2005.

== Personal life ==
He is the brother of racing cyclist Charline Joiner.

Joiner retired from professional rugby in 2015 to pursue a career in different financial companies. He initially joined Cornelian Asset Managers where he undertook his professional qualifications before moving on to join Standard Life in 2010.

He recently went on a sailing trip to Oban.
