= Mark McKenzie (rugby union) =

Scottish rugby union player

- Born: Mark McKenzie; 2 December 1971 (age 54) Scotland
- Height: 171 cm (5 ft 7 in)
- Weight: 78 kg (12 st 4 lb)
- School: Dunblane High School
- University: University of the Highlands and Islands
- Notable relative(s): Kevin McKenzie, brother

Rugby union career
- Position: Fly-half
Amateur team(s)
Years	Team	Apps	(Points)
- Stirling County
–	Falkirk RFC		
Senior career
Years	Team	Apps	(Points)
1996-98	Caledonia Reds		
1998-2000	CS Bourgoin-Jallieu		
2000	Glasgow Warriors	8	(97)
2001	Nice		
Provincial / State sides
Years	Team	Apps	(Points)
- Glasgow District
-	North and Midlands		
International career
Years	Team	Apps	(Points)
- Scotland U18
–	Scotland U19		
–	Scotland A		
Coaching career
- Years: Team
- 2012: Falkirk RFC

Mark McKenzie (born 2 December 1971) is a former Scotland 'A' international Scottish rugby union player. He played for Caledonia Reds and Glasgow Warriors in Scotland, and for CS Bourgoin-Jallieu and Nice in France.

McKenzie's career spanned the amateur and professional era. In 1989, he was playing for Glasgow District Under 18s. He won the Division One league title in 94/95 with Stirling County.

On Scotland's rugby professionalism in 1996, McKenzie then played for Caledonia Reds and won the Scottish Inter-District Championship with them in the 1996-97 season; their first ever title. He played in the Heineken Cup with Caledonia Reds.

When Caledonia Reds merged with Glasgow Rugby in 1998, to form Glasgow Caledonians, now Glasgow Warriors, McKenzie found himself without a professional club. He was to move to France where he joined CS Bourgoin-Jallieu. He was there from 1998 to 2000.

He signed for Glasgow Warriors for the start of the 2000 - 01 season. He made 3 appearances, scoring 129 points from three tries, 24 conversions, 20 penalties and two drop-goals. Competitively, he played 8 matches scoring 97 points. McKenzie made his debut for Glasgow in a friendly playing the Pacific Coast Grizzlies.

In late 2000 he asked to leave Glasgow so that he could return to France to be with his girlfriend. He was unable to settle back in Scotland without her. The Glasgow coach Richie Dixon stated: "Reluctantly, we agreed to let Mark go with effect from the New Year. Obviously we are very sorry to see such a talented player departing but we wish him well in the future." The Chief Executive David Jordan said: "There has been no acrimony over the parting of ways. Mark leaves us on good terms and we genuinely hope his career blossoms again. He is a very potent midfielder and I can see no reason why he should not be continuing to push for Scotland honours in the near future."

Starting 2001, McKenzie secured a two-and-a-half-year deal with French side Nice.

McKenzie also played in New Zealand.

McKenzie came through the ages for Scotland. He played at Scotland U18, Scotland U19 and then Scotland 'A'.

He became a SRU Regional Academy coach

He played for, then coached Falkirk RFC. He won BT National League Division 4 Player of the Year in 2005 and helped take the Falkirk club back up through the divisions, winning five successive championships. He mentored Finn Russell, Adam Ashe and Grant Gilchrist.

In 2012, he was appointed St Aloysius College's new director of rugby. He is also a Sports Performance consultant with ESP.
