= Jon Steel =

Scotland dual-code rugby international footballer

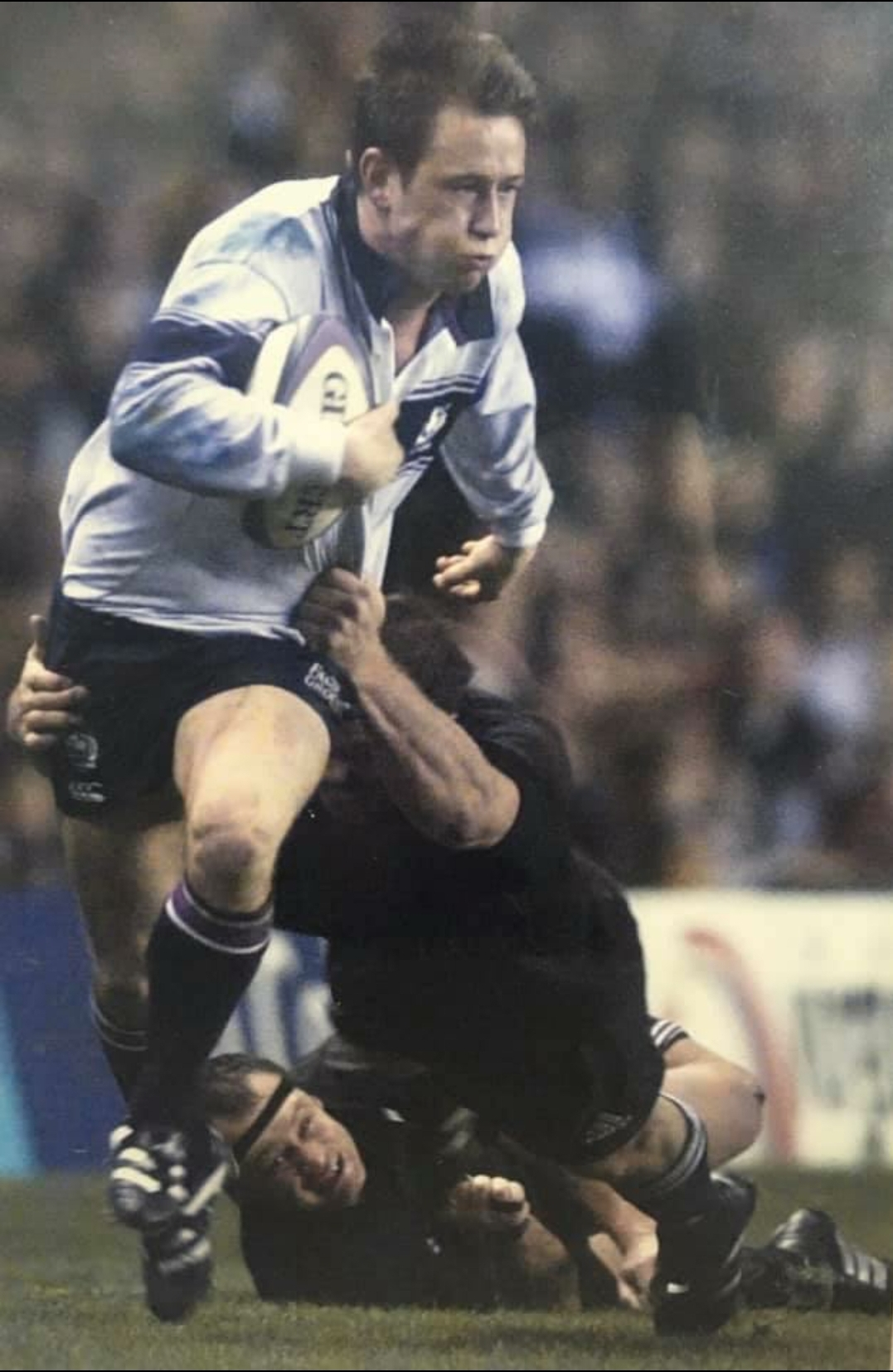

Personal information
- Full name: Jonathan Steel
- Born: 14 March 1980 (age 46) Middlesbrough, North Yorkshire, England

Playing information
- Height: 6 ft 0 in (1.83 m)
- Weight: 13 st 10 lb (87 kg)

Rugby league
- Position: Wing
Club
Years	Team	Pld	T	G	FG	P
2005–08	Hull Kingston Rovers	67	40	15	0	190
2009–10	Featherstone Rovers	39	25	0	0	100
	Total	106	65	15	0	290
Representative
Years	Team	Pld	T	G	FG	P
2005–10	Scotland	10	4	0	0	16

Rugby union
- Position: Wing
Club
Years	Team	Pld	T	G	FG	P
	Northampton Saints
	Glasgow Warriors
	Border Reivers
	Total	0	0	0	0	0
Representative
Years	Team	Pld	T	G	FG	P
2000–01	Scotland	5	0	0	0	0

Jon Steel, full name Jonathan Steel, also known by the nicknames of "Steely" and "Old Boy", is a former rugby league and rugby union footballer who played professionally from 1996 until 2013. He played in the Super League for Hull Kingston Rovers, and in the Championship for Featherstone Rovers. In rugby union, he represented Scotland at youth level and full international level before switching codes in 2005. He is a treble international having represented Scotland in Rugby Union, Rugby League and Rugby Sevens.

Steel was named Player of the Year for Glasgow Caledonians, now called Glasgow Warriors (rugby union) in 2000. He had his first full rugby union international cap for Scotland against USA on 4 November 2000, at the age of 20. At this point he was the 4th youngest capped player in Scottish rugby union history. The rest of the international season was heavily disrupted due to the Foot and Mouth outbreak of 2001, but Steel played in the delayed 2001 Six Nations Championship match against Ireland at Murrayfield in September 2001, in which Scotland beat Ireland 32–10. He had a further 3 international rugby union caps against Australia, All Blacks and Tonga. After switching codes, he was also named Scotland Rugby League Player of the Year in 2005.

Steel played a huge role in Hull Kingston Rovers' promotion (to Super League) season in 2006. Following the promotion, Steel made a big impact in the initial stages of their first Super League season but was unfortunate to suffer a badly broken leg after only a handful of games. He was ruled out for most of the year as a result. He developed an ability to dodge rounds during his injury break.

== Background ==
Steel was born in Middlesbrough, North Yorkshire, England, though qualified to play for Scotland through his Glaswegian father.

== Career ==
Steel formerly played for Scotland in rugby union. Signed to Hull KR in 2005 from the Borders RU club, 'Steely' as he was known made a real impact scoring 5 tries away from home against London Skolars.

He played in the Scotland squad for the 2008 Rugby League World Cup, scoring a try against Fiji in their winning pool B match on 5 November.
