= Eric Peters (rugby union) =

Scotland international rugby union player

- Born: 28 January 1969 (age 57) Glasgow, Scotland
- Height: 1.96 m (6 ft 5 in)
- Weight: 105 kg (16 st 7 lb)
- School: Brentwood School
- University: Cambridge University
- Occupation: Chartered Surveyor

Rugby union career
- Position: Number eight
Amateur team(s)
Years	Team	Apps	(Points)
- Loughborough Students
–	Cambridge University R.U.F.C.		
Senior career
Years	Team	Apps	(Points)
1993–2000	Bath Rugby		
2000–2001	Harlequins		
2002	Fylde		
2002	Rotherham		
2002–2003	Connacht		
International career
Years	Team	Apps	(Points)
1995–1999	Scotland	29	(25)

Eric Peters (born 28 January 1969) is a Scottish former amateur and professional rugby union player, usually playing at Number 8, who rose to captain the Scotland national rugby union team.

== Early life ==
Born in Scotland Peters attended Brentwood School, Essex, and the University of Cambridge, where he became captain of rugby. He played rugby for England at both Under 21 and Student level, before choosing to play for Scotland at senior level.

== Rugby career ==
He joined Bath Rugby club in September 1993, when rugby union was still an amateur game, so he also qualified as a Chartered Surveyor and worked for a property consultant. He was a replacement for Bath in the victorious 1998 Heineken Cup final as they defeated Brive.

He first played for Scotland against Canada, in January 1995, and became a professional player when the code was changed in 1996. He was first appointed Scottish captain for the 1999 match against Italy, but sustained a shattered kneecap in April 1999, and was out of the game for over a year. In March 2000, whilst still undergoing rehabilitation and surgery on his knee, it was discovered that he had testicular cancer, which was successfully treated with chemotherapy.

Peters scored a memorable try in 1995 vs Wales at Murrayfield, regarded by Bill McLaren as "one of the great tries".

Whilst still injured, he left Bath and joined Harlequins, who he first played for in December 2000. Leaving Harlequins in 2001, he briefly joined Fylde and Rotherham before joining Connacht in 2002. He also briefly returned to the Scotland team in 2002. Peters usually played in the Number 8 position, is 1.96m tall and had a playing weight of 105 kg

== Later career ==
Retiring from professional rugby in 2003, Peters became a Chartered Surveyor and Senior Associate at property consultants King Sturge, for whom he still plays rugby sevens, helping them win the RICS tournament 3 years in a row. He also commentates on rugby for BBC Radio 5 Live and is a celebrity supporter of the Orchid cancer charity.
