= Roland Reid =

Scotland international rugby union player

- Born: Roland Reid; 13 September 1978 (age 48) Middelburg, South Africa
- Height: 1.93 m (6 ft 4 in)
- Weight: 96 kg (15 st 2 lb; 212 lb)
- School: Springs Hts
- University: Open University
- Notable relative(s): Don Kitchenbrand, great uncle

Rugby union career
- Position: Flanker / Wing
Amateur team(s)
Years	Team	Apps	(Points)
- Stirling County
Senior career
Years	Team	Apps	(Points)
1999–2004	Glasgow Warriors	80	(95)
2004–05	London Irish		
2005–	Leeds Tykes		
2006–09	Edinburgh		
Provincial / State sides
Years	Team	Apps	(Points)
1997–99	Golden Lions	1	(0)
2004	Golden Lions	9	(10)
2006	Boland Cavaliers	3	(5)
International career
Years	Team	Apps	(Points)
- South Africa U19
	Scotland A	13	
2001	Scotland	2	(5)
National sevens team
Years	Team		Comps
	Scotland		8
Coaching career
- Years: Team
- Scotland (women) (Asst)

Roland Reid (born 13 September 1978) is a Scottish rugby union coach and former professional player. He played twice for Scotland in 2001, for Scotland 7s and played professional club rugby for Glasgow Warriors, London Irish, Leeds Tykes and Edinburgh. Born in Middelburg, South Africa, Reid also played Currie Cup rugby for Golden Lions and Boland Cavaliers. Reid could play at either flanker, Number Eight or Wing.

== Rugby Union career ==
=== Professional career ===
Reid began his rugby career in South Africa playing for the Golden Lions, between 1997 and 1999,

In 1999, he moved to Scotland and played for Glasgow Warriors where he regularly changed positions for the side.

Reid was with Glasgow until 2004, when he returned to South Africa to play Currie Cup rugby with the Golden Lions during the 2004 Currie Cup Premier Division.

In season 2004-05 Reid moved to London Irish and the following season to Leeds Carnegie.

He played for the provincial side Boland Cavaliers in the 2006 Currie Cup First Division, where he helped them win the competition to gain promotion to the Currie Cup Premier Division.

Reid then moved back to Scotland where he played for Edinburgh until 2009, when he retired from professional rugby due to a persistent knee injury.

=== International career ===
Reid played for the South Africa U19 side.

Reid received his first full Scotland cap in 2001.

He also played for Scotland A and Scotland Sevens, which he helped win the World Cup Plate in March 2008.

=== Coaching career ===
While playing at Edinburgh, Reid gained a UKCC Level 1 coaching certificate.

He has a performance coaching business and a psychology degree from The Open University.

In 2013, he became the Assistant Coach for Scotland's Women Rugby side under Julie Maxton.

== Family ==
Reid's father was from Greenock and thus he was already Scottish-qualified. Reid's great uncle Don Kitchenbrand had played football for Rangers in the 1950s.
