= Hugh Gilmour =

Scotland international rugby union player

- Born: Hugh Ross Gilmour; 13 September 1974 (age 52) Edinburgh, Scotland
- Height: 6 ft 2 in (1.88 m)
- Weight: 95 kg (14 st 13 lb)

Rugby union career
- Position: Wing
Amateur team(s)
Years	Team	Apps	(Points)
- Heriots
–	CR Les Abelles		
–	Xodus Steelers		
Senior career
Years	Team	Apps	(Points)
1998-99	Edinburgh Rugby	4	(0)
International career
Years	Team	Apps	(Points)
1998	Scotland	1	(0)
Coaching career
- Years: Team
- RC Valencia

Hugh Gilmour (born 13 September 1974) is a former Scotland international rugby union player.

== Rugby Union career ==
=== Amateur career ===
Gilmour played rugby union for Heriots.

On moving to Spain he played for CR Les Abelles.

He has played on the Veteran 10s circuit with Xodus Steelers.

=== Professional career ===
He played for Edinburgh Rugby.

=== International career ===
Gilmour was capped once by Scotland, in their 1998 match against Fiji. He scored a try in the match. Despite his score Scotland lost the match and Gilmour was not selected again.

He recalls:

Like all young rugby players, I had always dreamed of playing for Scotland, but my debut was certainly a very different experience to what I imagined it would be.

I had come off a very successful Five Nations with the A team and was called on to the bench for the final match of the senior championship against England at Murrayfield.

I didn't get a taste of the action that day but I was hopeful I would claim my cap at some point on the tour to the southern hemisphere. So when the team was revealed for the Fiji game, I was obviously thrilled to be given the nod.

My memories of the day of the game and the match itself are a bit hazy, but it was very hard and physical. We didn't start very well and let them into the game with some basic errors and turn-overs, which allowed them to get ahead and that really got the crowd involved. Once they were in front, it was a became very difficult game to turn around because they were successfully disrupting us.

They were also playing some great handling and running rugby and we found it increasingly difficult to get any control of the game. In fact, the 51-26 result shows we clearly failed to do so. It was a disappointing day, ultimately, but I still feel fortunate to have been given the opportunity to play rugby for my country.

=== Coaching career ===
After playing, he coached the CR Les Abelles side.

== Outside of rugby union ==
Gilmour is a software developer. After working in Spain he returned to Scotland in 2015 and runs the software firm Gilmation.
