= 1999 Scotland rugby union tour of South Africa =

Summary
P	W	D	L
Total
4	2	0	2

The 1999 Scotland rugby union tour of South Africa was a series of matches played in June–July 1999 in South Africa by Scotland national rugby union team, to prepare the 1999 Rugby World Cup. No Test Matches were played.

== Results ==
'Scores and results list Scotland's points tally first.

Opposing Team	For	Against	Date	Venue	Status
Border	31	28	21 June 1999	East London	Tour match
N.O. Free State	38	24	25 June 1999	Welkom	Tour match
Pumas	15	28	29 June 1999	Witbank	Tour match
Golden Lions	31	33	3 July 1999	Ellis Park, Johannesburg	Tour match
