= Stewart Campbell (rugby union) =

Scotland international rugby union player

- Born: Stewart Joseph Campbell; 25 April 1972 (age 54) Glasgow, Scotland
- Height: 6 ft 6 in (1.98 m)
- Weight: 113 kg (17 st 11 lb)
- School: Balfron High School

Rugby union career
- Position: Lock
Amateur team(s)
Years	Team	Apps	(Points)
- Strathendrick RFC
–	West of Scotland		
–	Dundee HSFP		
–	Melrose RFC		
Senior career
Years	Team	Apps	(Points)
1996–1998	Caledonia Reds	13	(0)
1998–2001	Glasgow Warriors	64	(0)
2001−2002	Benetton Treviso	3	(0)
2002−2003	Leeds Carnegie	2	(0)
2003−2004	Leicester Tigers	4	(0)
Provincial / State sides
Years	Team	Apps	(Points)
- North and Midlands
International career
Years	Team	Apps	(Points)
- Scotland U18
- Scotland U19
- Scotland U21
- Scotland Club XV
1995–1998	Scotland A	16	
1995–1998	Scotland	17	(0)
- Correct as of 4 July 2015

Stewart Campbell (born 25 April 1972) is a former Scottish international rugby union player who played for Glasgow Caledonians (now Glasgow Warriors). He played in the Lock position.

Campbell started playing amateur rugby for Strathendrick RFC. Moving through amateur clubs he played for West of Scotland, Dundee HSFP and Melrose RFC.

When professional rugby started in Scotland in 1996, Campbell first played for the Caledonia Reds. On their merger with the Glasgow side he then turned out for Glasgow Caledonians in 1998.

Campbell then played for Treviso in Italy before moving to England to play for the Leicester Tigers and then Yorkshire Carnegie.

Campbell played for Scotland at various age grades, the Club XV side, the 'A' side and the Scottish national team.
