= Steve Griffiths (rugby union) =

Scottish rugby union player

- Born: Steven Griffiths; 4 August 1973 (age 53) Morecambe, England
- Height: 6 ft 5 in (1.96 m)
- Weight: 114 kg (17 st 13 lb)

Rugby union career
- Position: Lock
Amateur team(s)
Years	Team	Apps	(Points)
1995-96	Orrell		
Senior career
Years	Team	Apps	(Points)
1996-97	London Scottish		
1997-99	Leeds Tykes		
1999–2002	Glasgow Caledonians	54	
International career
Years	Team	Apps	(Points)
	Scotland A	9	

Steve Griffiths (born 4 August 1973 in Morecambe, England) is an English born former Scotland A international rugby union player who played for Glasgow Warriors - then known as Glasgow Caledonians - at the Lock position.

He qualified for Scotland as his mother was born in Edinburgh. Confirming his Scottish nationality by playing for the Scottish national 'A' side, he played 9 times at Scotland A level.

Starting with Orrell in 1995-96 season, Griffiths then was signed by London Scottish for the next season, before then moving to Leeds Tykes in for the 1997-98 season.

He played 26 times for Leeds Tykes in the 1998-99 season before moving to Scotland to play for Glasgow Caledonians.

He was to play 54 times for the professional Glasgow provincial side.

Griffiths had to retire from rugby in November 2002 due to a neck injury.
