= Derrick Lee (rugby union) =

Scotland international rugby union player

- Born: Derrick James Lee; 1 October 1973 (age 53) Ayr, Scotland
- Height: 1.75 m (5 ft 9 in)
- Weight: 81 kg (12 st 11 lb)

Rugby union career
- Position: Fullback
Amateur team(s)
Years	Team	Apps	(Points)
- Ayr RFC
- Watsonians
Senior career
Years	Team	Apps	(Points)
1998-1999	London Scottish	7	(0)
2000-2005	Edinburgh Rugby	38	(98)
International career
Years	Team	Apps	(Points)
1998–2004	Scotland	12	(34)

Derrick Lee (born 1 October 1973) is a retired Scottish rugby union player who played for Watsonians, London Scottish and Edinburgh Rugby. He was noted for his line breaking ability and reliability under the high ball. An instinctive understanding of timing and angles resulted in him being at one point the top try-scorer of all time in the Celtic League although that record has since been broken.

International Rugby:

He made his international debut against Ireland at Lansdowne Road on 7 February 1998. He earned 12 caps in total scoring 34 points with 1 try, 4 conversions and 7 penalties. He won his final cap also against Ireland at Lansdowne Road on 27 March 2004. He would have possibly won more caps had it not been for a run of injuries.

He announced his retirement from professional rugby in April 2005 due to persistent knee problems.
