= Jonathan Stuart =

Scottish rugby union player (born 1975)

- Born: Jonathan Hamilton Stuart; 29 December 1975 (age 50) Burnley, England
- Height: 1.83 m (6 ft 0 in)
- Weight: 98 kg (15 st 6 lb)
- University: Loughborough University

Rugby union career
- Position: Centre
Amateur team(s)
Years	Team	Apps	(Points)
1997-98	Paris University Rugby		
2002-04	Selkirk RFC		
Senior career
Years	Team	Apps	(Points)
1998-99	Leicester Tigers	16	(5)
1999-2002	Glasgow Warriors	67	(40)
2002-04	Border Reivers		
2004-05	Lyon OU		
2005-08	La Rochelle		
International career
Years	Team	Apps	(Points)
1997	Scotland U21		
2000-02	Scotland 'A'		

Jonathan Stuart (born 29 December 1975 in Burnley, England) is an English born former Scotland 'A' international rugby union player who played for Glasgow Warriors, then Glasgow Caledonians, at the Centre position.

Stuart attended Pocklington School.

Stuart originally played rugby for Paris University in season 1997-98 before signing for Leicester Tigers in the 1998-99 season. He had 8 starts for the Tigers and a further 8 appearances from the substitutes bench.

He signed for Glasgow Warriors in 1999 playing for them in the Heineken Cup, the Scottish-Welsh League and the Celtic League.

Stuart said of the move: "My main ambition is to play rugby for Scotland and I believe this move will provide me with the best opportunity to achieve that. Scotland's performances in the Five Nations championship inspired me and, having spoken with the Glasgow Caledonians coaching staff, they have assured me that they intend to play the same 15-man game."

Stuart had rejected approaches from England Students and the England Under 21 side to play for Scotland. He believed his grandfather was from Glasgow. He played for Scotland Under 21s in 1997 and was then picked for a Scotland 'A' international against Ireland 'A' in the 1999-2000 season, however he was later found to be ineligible in 2000.

His Scottish international career stalled when it was discovered that it was his great-grandfather and not his grandfather that was born in Glasgow. Stuart then had to wait out his residency period before making his dream return to Scotland colours.

He earned a legitimate Scotland 'A' cap to finally confirm his Scottish nationality - against Romania on 5 November 2002. Scotland won the match 21-18, with Stuart coming off the bench.

He was signed by the Border Reivers in 2002. When not involved with the professional provincial side he played for the amateur side Selkirk RFC. He played 4 matches in the Challenge Cup for the Reivers in the first season - and 6 matches in the Heineken Cup the next season as well as matches in the Celtic League.

In 2004, Stuart went back to France and signed for Lyon OU; in 2005 he moved to La Rochelle playing until 2008. This is also when he started his family, his daughter Megan born 2006, and his uglier son Campbell born 2008.

When Stuart finished his professional playing career he moved to Swansea and worked in marketing for Force XV. He then became a rugby agent at Top Marque Sports and became a director of the company. In 2018 he became the Head of Global Rugby for YMU, and rose to the YMU Global Director of Rugby in 2021. In 2024 he left YMU to found and direct NewStar International, an independent global player representation agency.
