= Lee Harrison (rugby union) =

English rugby union player

- Born: Lee Harrison; 10 December 1977 (age 48) Gravesend, England
- Height: 6 ft 2 in (1.88 m)
- Weight: 19 st 3 lb (122 kg)
- University: Exeter University
- Occupation: Rugby player

Rugby union career
- Position: Prop
Amateur team(s)
Years	Team	Apps	(Points)
- Vigo RFC
–	Newport		
Senior career
Years	Team	Apps	(Points)
1997-99	Exeter Chiefs		
2000-06	Glasgow Warriors	100	(15)
2006-09	Newport Gwent Dragons		
International career
Years	Team	Apps	(Points)
- Scotland U21

Lee Harrison (born 10 December 1977 in Gravesend) is an English-born Scottish former rugby union player. A prop forward, Harrison has represented Scotland at Under-21 level and for the Scottish Students.

He started his rugby career as a Number 8 at Vigo Rugby Club as a youngster and represented Kent and London & South east.

He has played club rugby for Exeter Chiefs whilst studying at Exeter University then the Glasgow Warriors and Newport Gwent Dragons.

He played in 100 competitive games for Glasgow in a spell spanning 6 years from 2000 to 2006.

After moving to Newport in June 2006 he played in over 50 games in three seasons before a serious neck injury, cut his career short in June 2009. He was released by the Dragons following neck surgery at the end of his contract.
