= Rory Kerr =

Scotland international rugby union player

- Born: Rory Campbell Kerr; 20 December 1979 (age 46) Glasgow, Scotland
- Height: 6 ft (1.8 m)
- Weight: 94 kg (14.8 st)
- School: Balfron High School
- University: Glasgow University

Rugby union career
- Position(s): Fullback, Wing
Amateur team(s)
Years	Team	Apps	(Points)
- Strathendrick
- West of Scotland
- Glasgow Hawks
2011-present	Strathendrick		
Senior career
Years	Team	Apps	(Points)
2000-05	Glasgow Warriors		
International career
Years	Team	Apps	(Points)
- Scotland U18
- Scotland U19
- Scotland U21
2001	Scotland A		
2002–2003	Scotland	3	(5)
National sevens team
Years	Team		Comps
- Scotland

Rory Kerr (born 20 December 1979 in Glasgow) is a former Scotland rugby union international and Glasgow Warriors player. He could play at Fullback or Wing positions.

== Amateur career ==
He played for various clubs. Starting out at amateur level with his local side Strathendrick he moved on to West of Scotland.

He was part of the Glasgow Thistle's squad that went to New Zealand for rugby training.

After a season hampered by injury in 2004-05, Kerr left Glasgow Warriors to go to New Zealand.

He returned to Scotland in 2006 and then played for amateur side Glasgow Hawks.

His career went full circle by going back to his first amateur team Strathendrick in 2011 He still plays for the team.

== Professional career ==
He secured a contract with Glasgow Warriors in 2000. A fans favourite, he wrote a column for the Glasgow Warriors website on being a professional player.

A difficult season under Kiwi Searancke made Kerr almost sign for Newcastle Falcons but he wasn't released by the Glasgow coaches. He stated: ""I was desperate to play rugby. There's nothing worse than training all week, and then not getting on to play. In retrospect, they weren't really the coaches from hell! They tried to change things and had some good ideas. They just didn't get the man-management right." That season, 2002–03, saw Kerr with 3 starts - all in the Scottish Inter-District Championship.

After a season hampered by injury in 2004-05, Kerr left Glasgow Warriors to go to New Zealand.

He presented the match ball before a sell out Scotstoun Stadium in the 12 December 2015 Glasgow Warriors European Champions Cup match against Scarlets in European Rugby Champions Cup match.

== International career ==
He played for Scotland Under 18s and Under 19s in 1997-98. He progressed to play for Scotland A in 2001 before winning his first full cap against Canada.

== Outside of rugby ==
Professionally he is now a Director at Ability Energy UK.
