= Dave Hilton (rugby union) =

Scotland international rugby union player (born 1970)

- Born: David Ivor Walter Hilton; 3 April 1970 (age 56) Bristol, England
- Height: 5 ft 11 in (1.80 m)
- Weight: 234 lb (106 kg)

Rugby union career
- Position: Prop
Amateur team(s)
Years	Team	Apps	(Points)
2001	Kirkcaldy	2	
Senior career
Years	Team	Apps	(Points)
?-1999	Bath		
1999–2003	Glasgow Warriors	92	(10)
2003-2008	Bristol	49	(40)
International career
Years	Team	Apps	(Points)
1995-2002	Scotland	42	(5)
Coaching career
- Years: Team
- ?–2011: Dings Crusaders
- 2012–present: Moseley

David Ivor Walter Hilton (born 3 April 1970) is a former professional rugby union player who played as a prop. Although he was born in England, he qualified to play for the Scotland national team by virtue of a grandfather who he believed was born in Scotland; however, it later emerged that his grandfather's birth was registered in England. Despite this, Hilton completed a residency period to restore his Scottish eligibility, and he went on to win a total of 42 caps in a seven-year international career. At club level, he played for Bath, Glasgow and Bristol.

== Career ==
=== Professional career ===
During his club career, Hilton won the Heineken Cup for Bath in 1998, as well as league and domestic cup successes for the same club.

He left Bath and played for Glasgow in the Welsh-Scottish League and then the Celtic League.

After being capped for Scotland on residency criteria he continued to play for Glasgow until 2003 before then returning to England to play for Bristol, until his retirement in 2008.

=== International career ===
Hilton won his first cap for Scotland against Canada on 21 January 1991 and his 42nd and final cap against South Africa on 16 November 2002. Hilton originally believed he qualified for Scotland as his grandfather was born there.

However, in 2000 - and after 41 caps for Scotland - Hilton discovered his grandfather's birth was registered in Bristol and not Edinburgh as he believed. Hilton claimed that his grandfather was born 16 weeks before the Bristol registration but he could not prove whether or not his grandfather was born in Scotland. Without adequate documentation he did not qualify to play for Scotland under the international eligibility rules.

At around the same time it was discovered that Welsh internationals Shane Howarth and Brett Sinkinson were ineligible to play for Wales under the grandparent rules. The resulting scandal encompassing Hilton and the others was named Grannygate and was embarrassing for the players and rugby unions alike. However both the SRU and the WRU escaped without punishment. As part of a subsequent TV investigation, Hilton's great-grandfather was traced to Glasgow giving credence to Hilton's Scottish ancestry.

Hilton had already moved from Bath to Glasgow to play for Glasgow Caledonians, later renamed Glasgow Rugby, a year before the scandal broke so he had already a period of residence in Scotland. He had then to complete another two years in order to qualify again for Scotland under the three-year residency rule. After that period of residency Hilton played once more for Scotland in a victory over South Africa in 2002.

=== Coaching career ===
In 2012 Hilton joined Moseley as forwards coach and occasional replacement prop, having previously been coach at Dings Crusaders. Hilton also coaches Clifton RFC Under-14s, who in the 2016/17 season won the Gloucester County Cup, the Nando's Cup, the Bristol Combination 7s Cup and were finalists in the Bristol Combination Cup. Clifton later went on to win the Bristol Combination cup as well as another Nando's Cup and three more Bristol combination 7s cups.

Hilton now coaches Bristol Bears Women in the Tyrell's Premier 15s completion.
