= 2001–02 Glasgow Warriors season =

Glasgow Warriors 2001 / 2002
- Ground: Hughenden Stadium (Capacity: 6,000)
- Coach: (Scotland) Richie Dixon
- Captain: (Scotland) Andy Nicol
- Most caps: (Scotland) Gordon Bulloch (27)
- Top scorer: (Cook Islands) Tommy Hayes (306)
- Most tries: (Cook Islands) Tommy Hayes (Scotland) Rory Kerr (6)
- League: 2001–02 Celtic League
- 3rd in Pool A & Semi-finalists Celtic League; 8th in 2001-02 Welsh-Scottish League
Team kit

The 2001–02 season is the sixth in the history of the Glasgow Warriors as a professional side. During this season the young professional side competed as Glasgow Rugby; reverting to their original professional title and dropping the Caledonian name inherited from the Caledonia Reds merger. However, the team gains the epithet Warriors at least from this season.

The 2001–02 season saw Glasgow Rugby compete in competitions: the Welsh-Scottish League, the Celtic League, the European Champions Cup, and the Heineken Cup.

== Season Overview ==
=== Warriors name begins ===
At least from this season the team acquired its Warriors moniker – if not yet officially – and even becomes known as such to opposition fans. The Glasgow–Leinster semi-final programme, in Tony Ward's Leinster preview, states, "it adds to the competition enormously that the Glasgow Warriors remain on board thereby breaking the Irish provincial monopoly."

== Team ==
=== Coaches ===
- Head coach: (Scotland) Richie Dixon
- Assistant coach: (New Zealand) Gordon Macpherson
- Assistant coach: (Scotland) Rob Moffat

=== Squad ===
Hookers (Scotland) Gordon Bulloch (Scotland) Chris Docherty (Scotland) Dougie Hall (England) Alex Moffat (Scotland) Gavin Scott Props (Australia) Cameron Blades (Scotland) Lee Harrison (Scotland) Dave Hilton (Scotland) Andrew Kelly (Scotland) Gordon McIlwham (Scotland) Euan Murray (Scotland) Ben Prescott (Scotland) Gordon Sykes Locks (Scotland) Steve Griffiths (Scotland) Andrew Hall (Scotland) Guy Perrett (Scotland) Nathan Ross (Scotland) Colin Stewart (Scotland) Jason White	Loose forwards (Scotland) Gareth Flockhart (Scotland) Richard Maxton (Scotland) Donnie Macfadyen (Scotland) Tom McLaren (Scotland) Jon Petrie (Scotland) Roland Reid (Scotland) Gordon Simpson (Scotland) Martin Waite Half backs (Scotland) Graeme Beveridge (Scotland) Chris Black (Scotland) Andy Nicol (Scotland) Kenny Sinclair (Scotland) Chris Cusiter Stand offs (Cook Islands) Tommy Hayes (Scotland) Calvin Howarth (Scotland) Barry Irving	Centres (Scotland) Alan Bulloch (Scotland) Andrew Henderson (Scotland) Ian McInroy (Scotland) James McLaren (Scotland) Jonathan Stuart Back Three (New Zealand) Michael Bartlett (Scotland) James Craig (Scotland) Rory Kerr (Scotland) Graeme Kiddie (Scotland) Glenn Metcalfe (Scotland) Jon Steel

== Player statistics ==
During the 2001–02 season, Glasgow have used 43 different players in competitive games. The table below shows the number of appearances and points scored by each player.

The 5 matches jointly held between the Welsh-Scottish League and the Celtic League are found only in the statistics for the Celtic League.

Pos.	Nation	Name	Welsh-Scottish League			Celtic League			Heineken Cup			Total	
Pos.	Nation	Name	Apps (sub)	Points		Apps (sub)	Points		Apps (sub)	Points		Apps (sub)	Total Pts
Pos.	Nation	Name	Apps (sub)	Try	Kick	Apps (sub)	Try	Kick	Apps (sub)	Try	Kick	Apps (sub)	Total Pts
HK	(Scotland)	Gordon Bulloch	12(1)	0	0	8	0	0	6	0	0	26(1)	0
HK	(Scotland)	Dougie Hall	2(3)	0	0	0	0	0	0	0	0	2(3)	0
HK	(Scotland)	Gavin Scott	1(2)	0	0	1(4)	0	0	0	0	0	2(6)	0
PR	(Australia)	Cameron Blades	5(1)	1	0	5(2)	0	0	1(1)	0	0	11(4)	5
PR	(Scotland)	Lee Harrison	5(4)	0	0	7(1)	1	0	2(2)	0	0	14(7)	5
PR	(Scotland)	Dave Hilton	9(4)	0	0	4(1)	0	0	5(1)	0	0	18(6)	0
PR	(Scotland)	Andrew Kelly	(1)	0	0	0	0	0	0	0	0	(1)	0
PR	(Scotland)	Gordon McIlwham	11	0	0	2	0	0	4(1)	0	0	17(1)	0
PR	(Scotland)	Euan Murray	(2)	0	0	(2)	0	0	0	0	0	(4)	0
PR	(Scotland)	Ben Prescott	(1)	0	0	0	0	0	(1)	0	0	(2)	0
LK	(Scotland)	Steve Griffiths	6(2)	0	0	1(2)	0	0	2(1)	0	0	9(5)	0
LK	(Scotland)	Andrew Hall	8(4)	0	0	2(4)	0	0	1(2)	0	0	11(10)	0
LK	(Scotland)	Guy Perrett	4(3)	0	0	0	0	0	0	0	0	4(3)	0
LK	(Scotland)	Nathan Ross	6(3)	1	0	7(1)	1	0	4(2)	0	0	17(6)	10
LK	(Scotland)	Colin Stewart	2(3)	0	0	(3)	0	0	0	0	0	2(6)	0
LK	(Scotland)	Jason White	7	0	0	8	2	0	6	0	0	21	10
BR	(Scotland)	Gareth Flockhart	3(5)	0	0	5(1)	2	0	4(1)	0	0	12(7)	10
BR	(Scotland)	Donnie Macfadyen	11	2	0	4	0	0	1	0	0	16	10
BR	(Scotland)	Richard Maxton	(2)	0	0	0	0	0	0	0	0	(2)	0
BR	(Scotland)	Tom McLaren	1(2)	0	0	0	0	0	0	0	0	1(2)	0
BR	(Scotland)	Jon Petrie	13	2	0	7	0	0	6	0	0	26	10
BR	(Scotland)	Roland Reid	7(1)	3	0	5(1)	4	0	6	2	0	18(2)	45
BR	(Scotland)	Gordon Simpson	8(1)	0	0	8(1)	2	0	2(1)	0	0	18(3)	10
BR	(Scotland)	Martin Waite	(1)	0	0	0	0	0	0	0	0	(1)	0
SH	(Scotland)	Graeme Beveridge	10(1)	4	0	1(2)	1	0	1(3)	0	0	12(6)	25
SH	(Scotland)	Chris Black	0	0	0	1(2)	0	0	0	0	0	1(2)	0
SH	(Scotland)	Chris Cusiter	(1)	0	0	0	0	0	0	0	0	(1)	0
SH	(Scotland)	Andy Nicol	3	0	0	7	2	0	5	0	0	15	10
SH	(Scotland)	Kenny Sinclair	2(2)	2	0	0	0	0	0	0	0	2(2)	10
FH	(Cook Islands)	Tommy Hayes	10(2)	0	116	8	4	91	6	2	69	24(2)	306
FH	(Scotland)	Calvin Howarth	4(3)	1	25	0	0	0	0	0	0	4(3)	30
FH	(Scotland)	Barry Irving	(1)	0	0	1(2)	0	7	(1)	0	0	1(4)	7
CE	(Scotland)	Alan Bulloch	9(2)	3	0	(1)	0	0	1(1)	0	0	10(4)	15
CE	(Scotland)	Andrew Henderson	10	2	0	8	1	0	6	0	0	24	15
CE	(Scotland)	Ian McInroy	(1)	0	0	2(1)	0	0	0	0	0	2(2)	0
CE	(Scotland)	James McLaren	7(2)	0	3	8	4	3	5	1	8	20(2)	39
CE	(Scotland)	Jonathan Stuart	7(4)	1	0	2(4)	0	0	1(1)	0	0	10(9)	5
WG	(New Zealand)	Michael Bartlett	8	1	0	3	1	0	3	0	0	14	10
WG	(Scotland)	James Craig	(1)	0	0	1(1)	2	0	0	0	0	1(2)	10
WG	(Scotland)	Rory Kerr	10	2	0	6	1	0	3	3	0	19	30
WG	(Scotland)	Jon Steel	10	2	0	6	1	0	3	0	0	19	15
FB	(Scotland)	Graeme Kiddie	2(2)	0	20	3	0	0	0	0	0	5(2)	20
FB	(Scotland)	Glenn Metcalfe	12	2	0	4	2	0	6	1	0	22	25

== Player movements ==
=== Player transfers ===
==== In ====
(Scotland) Tom McLaren from (Australia) Bathurst RFC
(Scotland) Calvin Howarth from (Scotland) Edinburgh (loan)
(Scotland) Chris Cusiter from (Scotland) Watsonians
(Scotland) Andrew Kelly from (Scotland) Ayr RFC
(Scotland) Kenny Sinclair from (Scotland) Glasgow Hawks
(Scotland) Andrew Hall from (England) Moseley
(Scotland) Nathan Ross from (Australia) Queensland Reds
(Australia) Cameron Blades from (Australia) New South Wales Waratahs
(Scotland) Ben Prescott from (Scotland) Aberdeen GSFP

==== Out ====
(Scotland) Calvin Howarth to (Scotland) Edinburgh (loan ends)
(Scotland) Andrew Welsh to (Scotland) Heriot's

== Competitions ==
=== Pre-season and friendlies ===
==== Match 1 ====
10 August 2001

Newcastle Falcons (England)	20–3	(Scotland) Glasgow
Try: Va'aiga Tuigamala; Epi Tainone; Con: Dave Walder; Dave Richardson; Pen: Dave Walder (2)	Preview; Report	Pen: Tommy Hayes

Kingston Park
Referee: D. Pearson (Northumberland)

Newcastle Falcons: D Richardson; L Botham, J Noon, J Pattison, (G Maclure 57), V. 'Inga' Tuigamala; D Walder (M Stephenson 59), G Armstrong; M Ward, (G Peel 40), M Howe (C Balshem 72), M Hurter (G Graham 40), S Grimes (C Hamilton 61), H Vyvyan, J Dunbar (E Taipone 60), R Arnold (captain), A Mower

Glasgow Caledonians: Graeme Kiddie (R Kerr 70); J Steel, J McLaren (A Henderson 65), I McInroy (J Craig 71); T Hayes, A Nicol (captain); D Hilton (G Sykes 68), G Scott (G Bulloch 78), L Harrison, C Stewart, J White (S Griffiths 10), G Simpson, J Petrie (R Reid 79), G Flockhart

==== Match 2 ====
14 August 2001

Glasgow (Scotland)	15–35	(England) Northampton Saints
Try: Rory Kerr (2); Con: Tommy Hayes; Pen: Barry Irving	Report	Try: Steve Thompson; Mark Tucker; John Leslie; Andrew Blowers; Nick Beal; Con: Ali Hepher (5)

Hughenden Stadium
Attendance: 500
Referee: M Hall (Boroughmuir)

Glasgow Caledonians:R Kerr; J Steel, I McInroy, A Henderson, J Craig; B Irving, C Black; G Sykes, G Scott, L Harrison, C Stewart, N Ross, R Reid, D Macfadyen, G Flockhart. Subs all used: B Prescott, A Hall, G Bulloch, G Perrett, G Simpson, T Hayes, J Petrie, R Reid

Northampton Saints: N Beal; L Martin, M Tucker, J Leslie, C Moir; A Hepher, J Howard; C Budgen, S Thompson, M Stewart, J Phillips, O Brouzet, A Blowers, B Pountney, M Soden. Subs used: R Hunter, P Grayson, C Hyndman, I Vass, S Brotherstone

=== European Champions Cup ===
==== Pool 5 ====
Team	P	W	D	L	Tries for	Tries against	Try diff	Points for	Points against	Points diff	Pts
(France) Montferrand	6	4	1	1	23	7	16	191	100	91	9
(Wales) Cardiff	6	3	0	3	16	15	1	154	154	0	6
(Scotland) Glasgow	6	2	1	3	10	23	−13	126	198	−72	5
(England) Northampton	6	2	0	4	12	16	−4	132	151	−19	4

==== Results ====
===== Round 1 =====
28 September 2001
19:30

Glasgow (Scotland)	19 – 19	(France) Montferrand
Try: Tommy Hayes; Con: Tommy Hayes; Pen: Tommy Hayes (4)	Preview; Report; Report; Report; Report; Report	Try: Oliver Magne; Con: Gérald Merceron; Pen: Gérald Merceron (4)

Hughenden Stadium
Attendance: 5,764
Referee: Alan Lewis (Ireland)

===== Round 2 =====
7 October 2001
15:45

Northampton Saints (England)	30 – 9	(Scotland) Glasgow
Try: James Brooks; Mark Tucker; Luca Martin; Budge Pountney; Con: Matt Dawson (2); Pen: Matt Dawson (2)	Preview; Preview; Preview; Preview; Report; Report; Report	Pen: Tommy Hayes (2); Drop: Tommy Hayes

Franklin's Gardens
Attendance: 7,433
Referee: M Salera (Italy)

===== Round 3 =====
27 October 2001
15:00

Cardiff (Wales)	46 – 7	(Scotland) Glasgow
Try: Anthony Sullivan (3); Iestyn Harris (3); Con: Iestyn Harris (5); Pen: Iestyn Harris (2)	Preview; Preview; Report; Report; Report; Report; Report; Report	Try: Glenn Metcalfe; Con: Tommy Hayes

Cardiff Arms Park
Attendance: 9,300
Referee: Chris White (England)

===== Round 4 =====
4 November 2001
15:45

Glasgow (Scotland)	47 – 32	(Wales) Cardiff
Try: James McLaren; Rory Kerr; Tommy Hayes; Roland Reid; Con: Tommy Hayes (3); Pen: Tommy Hayes (7)	Preview; Preview; Report; Report; Report; Report; Report; Report; Report; Report	Try: Rhys Williams; Andrew Henry; Pieter Muller; Iestyn Harris; Con: Iestyn Harris (3); Pen: Iestyn Harris (2)

Hughenden Stadium
Attendance: 4,823
Referee: G de Santi (Italy)

===== Round 5 =====
4 January 2002
15:00

Glasgow (Scotland)	31 – 27	(England) Northampton Saints
Try: Rory Kerr (2); Roland Reid; Con: James McLaren; Tommy Hayes; Pen: James McLaren (2); Tommy Hayes (2)	Preview; Preview; Report; Report; Report	Try: Ben Cohen; Andrew Blowers; Con: Paul Grayson; Pen: Paul Grayson (4); Drop: Paul Grayson

Firhill Stadium
Attendance: 3,426
Referee: Joel Dumé (France)

===== Round 6 =====
13 January 2002
15:00

Montferrand (France)	44 – 13	(Scotland) Glasgow
Try: Jimmy Marlu; Raphael Chanal; Tony Marsh; Gérald Merceron; Aurélien Rougerie; Con: Sébastien Viars; Gérald Merceron (2); Xavier Sadourny; Pen: Gérald Merceron (2)	Preview; Preview; Preview; Report; Report; Report	Try: Penalty Try; Con: Tommy Hayes; Pen: Tommy Hayes (2)

Stade Marcel-Michelin
Attendance: 10,000
Referee: David McHugh (Ireland)

=== Magners Celtic League ===
The first season of the Celtic League started slowly, but in the end was a big success. Players, coaches and spectators all enjoyed the new tournament. In Ireland, especially, the Celtic League generated great interest.

==== Pool A ====
	Team	Pld	W	D	L	PF	PA	PD	TF	TA	Pts
1	(Ireland) Leinster	7	7	0	0	281	114	+167	35	8	21
2	(Ireland) Ulster	7	4	1	2	194	157	+37	19	17	13
3	(Scotland) Glasgow	7	4	1	2	204	172	+32	25	17	13
4	(Wales) Llanelli	7	4	0	3	175	123	+52	14	7	12
5	(Wales) Swansea	7	3	0	4	124	158	−34	9	12	9
6	(Wales) Bridgend	7	3	0	4	161	208	−47	17	25	9
7	(Wales) Pontypridd	7	1	0	6	111	207	−96	8	25	3
8	(Wales) Ebbw Vale	7	1	0	6	134	245	−111	13	29	3
Match points were awarded as follows: 3 points for a win; 1 point for a draw
Green background (rows 1 to 4) qualify for the knock-out stage. Source: PRO12

==== Results ====
===== Round 1 =====
17 August 2001
19:35

Leinster (Ireland)	39 – 11	(Scotland) Glasgow
Try: Girvan Dempsey; Gordon D'Arcy; Andrew Dunne; Con: Brian O'Meara (3); Pen: Brian O'Meara (6)	Preview; Preview; Report; Report; Report; Report	Try: Andy Nicol; Pen: Tommy Hayes (2)

Donnybrook Stadium
Attendance: 4,500
Referee: Paul Adams (Wales)

===== Round 2 =====
24 August 2001
19:30

Glasgow (Scotland)	25 – 25	(Ireland) Ulster
Try: Gordon Simpson (2); Andy Nicol; Con: Tommy Hayes (2); Pen: Tommy Hayes; James McLaren	Preview; Preview; Preview; Report; Report; Report	Try: Paddy Wallace; Ryan Constable; Russell Nelson; Con: Paddy Wallace; David Humphreys; Pen: David Humphreys (2)

Hughenden Stadium
Attendance: 6,095
Referee: N Whitehouse (Wales)

===== Round 3 / Welsh-Scottish League Round 1 =====
29 August 2001
19:00

Bridgend (Wales)	50 – 15	(Scotland) Glasgow
Try: Adrian Durston; Gareth Thomas (2); Gareth Jones; Ma'ama Molitika; Con: Cerith Rees (5); Pen: Cerith Rees (5)	Preview; Report; Report; Report; Report; Report	Try: James Craig; Roland Reid; Con: Barry Irving; Pen: Barry Irving

Brewery Field
Attendance: 4,300

===== Round 4 / Welsh-Scottish League Round 2 =====
31 August 2001
19:30

Glasgow (Scotland)	59 – 14	(Wales) Pontypridd
Try: Glenn Metcalfe; Tommy Hayes; Roland Reid (3); Jason White; James McLaren; Jon Steel; Lee Harrison; Con: Tommy Hayes (7)	Preview; Report; Report; Report; Report; Report	Try: Gareth Wyatt; Dale McIntosh; Con: Alex Lawson; Ceri Sweeney

Hughenden Stadium
Attendance: 4,110
Referee: Alain Rolland (Ireland)

===== Round 5 / Welsh-Scottish League Round 3 =====
8 September 2001
14:30

Swansea (Wales)	13 – 21	(Scotland) Glasgow
Try: Garin Jenkins; Con: Gavin Henson; Pen: Gavin Henson (2)	Preview; Preview; Report; Report; Report; Report	Try: Tommy Hayes; Nathan Ross; Con: Tommy Hayes; Pen: Tommy Hayes (2); Drop: Tommy Hayes

St Helen's
Attendance: 2,500
Referee: Donal Courtney (Ireland)

===== Round 6 / Welsh-Scottish League Round 4 =====
11 September 2001
19:30

Glasgow (Scotland)	58 – 22	(Wales) Ebbw Vale
Try: James McLaren (2); Tommy Hayes; Glenn Metcalfe; Gareth Flockhart; Rory Kerr; Andrew Henderson; Graeme Beveridge; Con: Tommy Hayes (5); Barry Irving; Pen: Tommy Hayes (2)	Preview; Preview; Report; Report; Report	Try: Scott Mitchell (2); David Weatherley; Con: Scott Mitchell (2); Pen: Scott Mitchell

Hughenden Stadium
Attendance: 2,179
Referee: O Trevor (Ireland)

===== Round 7 / Welsh-Scottish League Round 5 =====
14 September 2001
19:30

Glasgow (Scotland)	15 – 9	(Wales) Llanelli
Pen: Tommy Hayes (5)	Preview; Preview; Report; Report; Report; Report; Report	Pen: Stephen Jones (2); Drop: Stephen Jones

Hughenden Stadium
Attendance: 5,375
Referee: David Tyndall (Ireland)

==== Knock out stages ====
===== Quarter-finals =====
1 December 2001
14:00

Connacht (Ireland)	29 – 34	(Scotland) Glasgow
Try: Tony Robinson; Wayne Munn; Con: Eric Elwood (2); Pen: Eric Elwood (4); Drop: Eric Elwood	Preview; Preview; Report; Report; Report; Report; Report; Report; Report	Try: James McLaren; Jason White; Gareth Flockhart; Tommy Hayes; Con: Tommy Hayes (4); Pen: Tommy Hayes (2)

Galway Sportsgrounds
Referee: Nigel Whitehouse (Wales)

===== Semi-finals =====
7 December 2001
19:30

Leinster (Ireland)	35 – 13	(Scotland) Glasgow
Try: Girvan Dempsey; Brian O'Driscoll; Shane Horgan; Denis Hickie; Con: Nathan Spooner (3); Pen: Nathan Spooner (2); Brian O'Meara	Preview; Preview; Preview; Report; Report; Report; Report	Try: Michael Bartlett; Con: Tommy Hayes; Pen: Tommy Hayes (2)

Lansdowne Road
Attendance: 5,500
Referee: N Williams (Wales)

=== Welsh-Scottish League ===
This was the final year of the Welsh-Scottish League.

==== 2001–02 League Table ====
Team	P	W	D	L	PF	PA	Tries	Pts
(Wales) Llanelli RFC	20	15	0	5	583	402	60	45
(Wales) Newport RFC	20	14	1	5	576	415	68	43
(Wales) Neath RFC	20	14	0	6	616	366	64	42
(Wales) Cardiff RFC	20	13	1	6	498	404	56	40
(Wales) Swansea RFC	20	11	0	9	451	404	42	33
(Scotland) Edinburgh	20	10	2	8	498	512	55	32
(Wales) Pontypridd RFC	20	9	0	11	441	440	41	27
(Scotland) Glasgow	20	8	1	11	475	527	50	25
(Wales) Bridgend RFC	20	7	1	12	498	545	50	22
(Wales) Ebbw Vale RFC	20	5	0	15	407	609	36	15
(Wales) Caerphilly RFC	20	1	0	19	379	798	40	3

==== Results ====
The first five Rounds were hosted jointly with this season's Celtic League and results are found in that section.

===== Round 6 =====
12 October 2001

Glasgow (Scotland)	40–22	(Wales) Caerphilly
Try: Cameron Blades; Alan Bulloch; Roland Reid (2); Nathan Ross; Con: Tommy Hayes (3); Pen: Tommy Hayes (3)	Preview; Report; Report	Try: David Hawkins; Con: Luke Richards; Pen: Luke Richards (4); Drop: Luke Richards

Hughenden Stadium
Attendance: 2973
Referee: Malcolm McEwan (Hawick)

===== Round 7 =====
1 December 2001
postponed to
30 April 2002

Glasgow (Scotland)	19–22	(Wales) Cardiff
Try: Kenny Sinclair; Con: Kenny Sinclair; Pen: Tommy Hayes (4)	Preview; Report; Report; Report	Try: Matt Allen; Nick Walne; Con: Nicky Robinson; Pen: Nicky Robinson (4)

Hughenden Stadium
Referee: John Steele (Dumfries)

===== Round 8 =====
22 December 2001

Caerphilly (Wales)	35–16	(Scotland) Glasgow
Try: David Hawkins; Geraint Lewis; Ben Watkins; Graham Thomas; Con: Luke Richards (3); Pen: Luke Richards (3)	Preview; Preview; Report; Report	Try: Alan Bulloch; Graeme Beveridge; Pen: Tommy Hayes (2)

Virginia Park
Attendance: 650
Referee: Hugh Lewis (Pontypridd)

===== Round 9 =====
26 December 2001
postponed to
29 March 2002

Glasgow (Scotland)	19–23	(Scotland) Edinburgh
Try: Graeme Beveridge; Con: Tommy Hayes; Pen: Tommy Hayes (4)	Preview; Preview; Report; Report	Try: David Officer; Kevin Utterson; Con: Duncan Hodge (2); Pen: Duncan Hodge (2); Drop: Duncan Hodge

Hughenden Stadium
Attendance: 4358
Referee: Paddy O'Brien (New Zealand)

===== Round 10 =====
19 January 2002

Cardiff (Wales)	29–12	(Scotland) Glasgow
Try: Matt Allen; Francois Mounier; Gary Powell; Rhys Williams; Con: Nicky Robinson (3); Pen: Nicky Robinson	Preview; Report; Report; Report; Report	Pen: Graeme Kiddie (4)

Cardiff Arms Park
Attendance: 4000
Referee: David R. Davies (Llanbradach)

===== Round 11 =====
9 February 2002

Pontypridd (Wales)	25–20	(Scotland) Glasgow
Try: Jason Lewis; Con: Nicky Little; Pen: Nicky Little (5); Ceri Sweeney	Preview; Preview; Report; Report; Report	Try: Andrew Henderson; Rory Kerr; Con: Tommy Hayes (2); Pen: Tommy Hayes (2)

Sardis Road
Attendance: 3000
Referee: Phil Fear (Llanharan)

===== Round 12 =====
22 February 2002

Edinburgh (Scotland)	13–13	(Scotland) Glasgow
Try: Derrick Lee; Martin Leslie; Pen: Brendan Laney	Preview; Report	Try: Alan Bulloch; Con: Tommy Hayes; Pen: Tommy Hayes (2)

Myreside
Attendance: 2732
Referee: Rob Dickson (Madras College FP)

===== Round 13 =====
9 March 2002

Newport (Wales)	55–5	(Scotland) Glasgow
Try: Peter Buxton; Jason Forster; Adrian Garvey; Andrew Powell; Rod Snow; Ofisa Tonu'u (3); Matthew Watkins; Con: Shane Howarth (5)	Preview; Report; Report; Report; Report	Try: Jonathan Stuart

Rodney Parade
Attendance: 6820
Referee: Paul Adams (Ebbw Vale)

===== Round 14 =====
15 March 2002

Glasgow (Scotland)	20–27	(Wales) Neath
Try: Jon Petrie; Pen: Tommy Hayes (5)	Preview; Report	Try: Gareth Llewellyn; Nathan Bonner-Evans; Con: Lee Jarvis; Pen: Lee Jarvis (5)

Hughenden Stadium
Attendance: 2421
Referee: Iain Ramage (Berwick)

===== Round 15 =====
13 April 2002

Neath (Wales)	46–8	(Scotland) Glasgow
Try: Kevin James (4); Gareth Morris; Barry Williams; Dave Tiueti; Andrew Howell; Con: Lee Jarvis (3)	Preview; Report; Report; Report; Report; Report; Report	Try: Michael Bartlett; Con: Calvin Howarth; Pen: Calvin Howarth

The Gnoll
Attendance: 2000
Referee: Hugh Watkins (WRU)

===== Round 16 =====
10 April 2002

Glasgow (Scotland)	21–16	(Wales) Bridgend
Try: Andrew Henderson; Glenn Metcalfe; Con: Graeme Kiddie; Pen: Calvin Howarth; Graeme Kiddie (2)	Preview; Report; Report; Report; Report	Try: Dafydd James; Con: Craig Warlow; Pen: Craig Warlow; Drop: Craig Warlow (2)

Hughenden Stadium
Referee: David Changleng (Gala)

===== Round 17 =====
20 April 2002

Llanelli (Wales)	40–14	(Scotland) Glasgow
Try: Mark Jones (3); Leigh Davies; Salesi Finau; Con: Gareth Bowen (3); Pen: Gareth Bowen (3)	Preview; Report; Report	Try: Jon Steel; Pen: Calvin Howarth (3)

Stradey Park
Attendance: 3500
Referee: Colin Saunders (Wales)

===== Round 18 =====
27 April 2002

Ebbw Vale (Wales)	18–37	(Scotland) Glasgow
Try: Rhys Shorney; Iestyn Thomas; Con: Gareth Cull; Pen: Gareth Cull (2)	Preview; Preview; Report; Report; Report	Try: Graeme Beveridge (2); Donnie Macfadyen (2); Glenn Metcalfe; Con: Tommy Hayes (2); Calvin Howarth; Pen: Tommy Hayes (2)

Eugene Cross Park
Attendance: 1200
Referee: Keri Evans (WRU)

===== Round 19 =====
3 May 2002

Glasgow (Scotland)	26–28	(Wales) Newport
Try: Calvin Howarth; Rory Kerr; Roland Reid; Con: Tommy Hayes; Pen: Tommy Hayes; Calvin Howarth (2)	Preview; Report; Report	Try: Llyr Lane; Matt Mostyn (2); Con: Shane Howarth (2); Pen: Shane Howarth; Jason Strange (2)

Hughenden Stadium
Attendance: 2500
Referee: John Hogg (Hawick)

===== Round 20 =====
10 May 2002

Glasgow (Scotland)	37–20	(Wales) Swansea
Try: Jon Steel; Kenny Sinclair; Jon Petrie; Con: Tommy Hayes; Calvin Howarth; Pen: Tommy Hayes (5); Drop: James McLaren	Preview; Report; Report; Report	Try: Matt Taylor; Nik Witkowski; Selilio Martens; Con: Gavin Henson; Pen: Gavin Henson

Hughenden Stadium
Attendance: 3560
Referee: Andy Ireland (Edinburgh Referees Society)
