= 2001–02 Welsh-Scottish League =

- Countries: Scotland Wales
- Champions: (Wales) Llanelli RFC
- Runners-up: (Wales) Newport RFC
- Matches played: 110

Llanelli won the third and final Welsh-Scottish League.

== 2001–2002 League Table ==
The top 5 Welsh teams plus Glasgow and Edinburgh qualified for next season's Heineken Cup. At the end of this season Glasgow Warriors and Edinburgh Rugby left the Scottish-Welsh League; making the 2002–03 a nine team Welsh Premier Division. The bottom side Caerphilly thus avoided regulation.

Team	P	W	D	L	PF	PA	Tries	Pts
(Wales) Llanelli RFC	20	15	0	5	583	402	60	45
(Wales) Newport RFC	20	14	1	5	576	415	68	43
(Wales) Neath RFC	20	14	0	6	616	366	64	42
(Wales) Cardiff RFC	20	13	1	6	498	404	56	40
(Wales) Swansea RFC	20	11	0	9	451	404	42	33
(Scotland) Edinburgh	20	10	2	8	498	512	55	32
(Wales) Pontypridd RFC	20	9	0	11	441	440	41	27
(Scotland) Glasgow	20	8	1	11	475	527	50	25
(Wales) Bridgend RFC	20	7	1	12	498	545	50	22
(Wales) Ebbw Vale RFC	20	5	0	15	407	609	36	15
(Wales) Caerphilly RFC	20	1	0	19	379	798	40	3

== Results ==
With 11 teams in the league it was impossible to have an even round system where each team played one another in a weekend. (One team would always have to sit out.)

The fixture list was instead devised so that teams would fulfil their fixtures in weekend or mid-week slots.

Each team would play 20 rounds in total.

The first 4 or 5 rounds for each club were hosted jointly by the Celtic League (dependent on which Celtic League pool those teams were in).

=== Welsh-Scottish and Celtic League fixtures ===
These rounds counted both for the Welsh-Scottish League and for the Celtic League.

Pool A of the Celtic League had 8 teams, Pool B had 7 teams in total. Of that, Pool A had 6 Scottish-Welsh teams and Pool B had 5 Scottish-Welsh teams.

Thus Scottish and Welsh teams of Pool A had 5 matches against one another. Scottish and Welsh teams of Pool B had 4 matches against one another.

These matches were played first in allocated slots.

==== Slot 1 ====
17 August 2001

Bridgend (Wales)	19–27	(Wales) Pontypridd

Brewery Field

18 August 2001

Caerphilly (Wales)	13–43	(Wales) Neath

18 August 2001

Llanelli (Wales)	46–16	(Wales) Ebbw Vale

==== Slot 2 ====
24 August 2001

Ebbw Vale (Wales)	18–13	(Wales) Pontypridd

24 August 2001

Neath (Wales)	25–14	(Wales) Cardiff

25 August 2001

Newport (Wales)	50–22	(Wales) Caerphilly

25 August 2001

Swansea (Wales)	16–25	(Wales) Bridgend

==== Slot 3 ====
28 August 2001

Edinburgh (Scotland)	20–32	(Wales) Neath
	Preview

28 August 2001

Pontypridd (Wales)	6–11	(Wales) Swansea

29 August 2001
19:00

Bridgend (Wales)	50–15	(Scotland) Glasgow
Try: Adrian Durston; Gareth Thomas (2); Gareth Jones; Maama Molitika; Con: Cerith Rees (5); Pen: Cerith Rees (5)	Preview; Report; Report; Report; Report; Report	Try: James Craig; Roland Reid; Con: Barry Irving; Pen: Barry Irving

Brewery Field
Attendance: 4,300

29 August 2001

Cardiff (Wales)	20–14	(Wales) Newport

==== Slot 4 ====
31 August 2001
19:30

Glasgow (Scotland)	59–14	(Wales) Pontypridd
Try: Glenn Metcalfe; Tommy Hayes; Roland Reid (3); Jason White; James McLaren; Jon Steel; Lee Harrison; Con: Tommy Hayes (7)	Preview; Report; Report; Report; Report; Report	Try: Gareth Wyatt; Dale McIntosh; Con: Alex Lawson; Ceri Sweeney

Hughenden Stadium
Attendance: 4,110
Referee: A Rolland (Ireland)

1 September 2001

Caerphilly (Wales)	15–49	(Wales) Cardiff

1 September 2001

Ebbw Vale (Wales)	21–26	(Wales) Swansea

1 September 2001

Llanelli (Wales)	36–3	(Wales) Bridgend

1 September 2001

Newport (Wales)	29–11	(Scotland) Edinburgh

==== Slot 5 ====
7 September 2001

Edinburgh (Scotland)	27–20	(Wales) Caerphilly

8 September 2001

Pontypridd (Wales)	17–19	(Wales) Llanelli

8 September 2001

Swansea (Wales)	13–21	(Scotland) Glasgow

==== Slot 6 ====
11 September 2001

Cardiff (Wales)	32–24	(Scotland) Edinburgh

11 September 2001

Glasgow (Scotland)	58–22	(Wales) Ebbw Vale

11 September 2001

Llanelli (Wales)	21–27	(Wales) Swansea

==== Slot 7 ====
14 September 2001

Glasgow (Scotland)	15–9	(Wales) Llanelli

15 September 2001

Ebbw Vale (Wales)	17–18	(Wales) Bridgend

15 September 2001

Neath (Wales)	11–19	(Wales) Newport

After 7 slots, each team had now played 4 or 5 rounds (depending on whether they were in Celtic League Pool A or B).

The remaining slots and rounds played were purely for the Welsh-Scottish League.

=== Welsh-Scottish League fixtures ===
==== Slot 8 ====
22 September 2001

Bridgend (Wales)	26–35	(Wales) Newport

22 September 2001

Cardiff (Wales)	25–13	(Wales) Swansea

22 September 2001

Neath (Wales)	26–41	(Wales) Llanelli

22 September 2001

Pontypridd (Wales)	38–8	(Wales) Caerphilly

==== Slot 9 ====
12 October 2001

Ebbw Vale (Wales)	15–10	(Scotland) Edinburgh

12 October 2001

Glasgow (Scotland)	40–22	(Wales) Caerphilly
Try: Cameron Blades; Alan Bulloch; Roland Reid (2); Nathan Ross; Con: Tommy Hayes (3); Pen: Tommy Hayes (3)	Preview; Report; Report	Try: David Hawkins; Con: Luke Richards; Pen: Luke Richards (4); Drop: Luke Richards

Hughenden Stadium
Attendance: 2973
Referee: Malcolm McEwan (Hawick)

==== Slot 10 ====
19 October 2001

Newport (Wales)	25–19	(Wales) Swansea

19 October 2001

Edinburgh (Scotland)	13–11	(Wales) Pontypridd

20 October 2001

Bridgend (Wales)	19–21	(Wales) Neath

20 October 2001

Caerphilly (Wales)	25–30	(Wales) Ebbw Vale

20 October 2001

Llanelli (Wales)	28–25	(Wales) Cardiff

==== Slot 11 ====
1 December 2001

Swansea (Wales)	22–14	(Wales) Ebbw Vale

1 December 2001
postponed to
30 April 2002

Glasgow (Scotland)	19–22	(Wales) Cardiff
Try: Kenny Sinclair; Con: Kenny Sinclair; Pen: Tommy Hayes (4)	Preview; Report; Report; Report	Try: M Allen; N Walne; Con: N Robinson; Pen: N Robinson (4)

Hughenden Stadium
Referee: John Steele (Dumfries)

==== Slot 12 ====
7 December 2001

Edinburgh (Scotland)	27–22	(Wales) Bridgend

7 December 2001

Llanelli (Wales)	17–13	(Wales) Newport

8 December 2001

Ebbw Vale (Wales)	6–45	(Wales) Neath

8 December 2001

Swansea (Wales)	36–21	(Wales) Caerphilly

==== Slot 13 ====
14 December 2001

Swansea (Wales)	3–12	(Wales) Pontypridd

15 December 2001

Bridgend (Wales)	28–24	(Wales) Ebbw Vale

15 December 2001

Caerphilly (Wales)	20–46	(Wales) Newport

15 December 2001

Cardiff (Wales)	16–12	(Wales) Neath

15 December 2001

Llanelli (Wales)	42–17	(Scotland) Edinburgh

==== Slot 14 ====
21 December 2001

Edinburgh (Scotland)	51–18	(Wales) Swansea

21 December 2001

Llanelli (Wales)	39–27	(Wales) Neath

22 December 2001

Bridgend (Wales)	25–25	(Wales) Cardiff

22 December 2001

Caerphilly (Wales)	35–16	(Scotland) Glasgow
Try: David Hawkins; Geraint Lewis; Ben Watkins; Graham Thomas; Con: Luke Richards (3); Pen: Luke Richards (3)	Preview; Preview; Report; Report	Try: Alan Bulloch; Graeme Beveridge; Pen: Tommy Hayes (2)

Virginia Park
Attendance: 650
Referee: Hugh Lewis (Pontypridd)

22 December 2001

Pontypridd (Wales)	33–13	(Wales) Ebbw Vale

==== Slot 15 ====
26 December 2001

Cardiff (Wales)	28–20	(Wales) Pontypridd

26 December 2001

Neath (Wales)	38–33	(Wales) Caerphilly

26 December 2001

Newport (Wales)	35–25	(Wales) Ebbw Vale

26 December 2001

Swansea (Wales)	35–9	(Wales) Llanelli

26 December 2001
postponed to
29 March 2002

Glasgow (Scotland)	19–23	(Scotland) Edinburgh
Try: Graeme Beveridge; Con: Tommy Hayes; Pen: Tommy Hayes (4)	Preview; Preview; Report; Report	Try: David Officer; Kevin Utterson; Con: Duncan Hodge (2); Pen: Duncan Hodge (2); Drop: Duncan Hodge

Hughenden Stadium
Attendance: 4358
Referee: Paddy O"Brien (New Zealand)

==== Slot 16 ====
28 December 2001

Pontypridd (Wales)	6–33	(Wales) Newport

29 December 2001

Bridgend (Wales)	31–33	(Wales) Llanelli

29 December 2001

Caerphilly (Wales)	21–35	(Scotland) Edinburgh

29 December 2001

Ebbw Vale (Wales)	22–20	(Wales) Cardiff

29 December 2001

Neath (Wales)	31–15	(Wales) Swansea

==== Slot 17 ====
18 January 2002

Newport (Wales)	24–9	(Wales) Llanelli

19 January 2002

Caerphilly (Wales)	16–36	(Wales) Pontypridd

19 January 2002

Cardiff (Wales)	29–12	(Scotland) Glasgow
Try: Matt Allen; Francois Mounier; Gary Powell; Rhys Williams; Con: Nicky Robinson (3); Pen: Nicky Robinson	Preview; Report; Report; Report; Report	Pen: Graeme Kiddie (4)

Cardiff Arms Park
Attendance: 4000
Referee: David R. Davies (Llanbradach)

==== Slot 18 ====
8 February 2002

Ebbw Vale (Wales)	3–16	(Wales) Llanelli

8 February 2002

Edinburgh (Wales)	19–19	(Wales) Newport

9 February 2002

Caerphilly (Wales)	3–38	(Wales) Swansea

9 February 2002

Neath (Wales)	35–21	(Wales) Bridgend

9 February 2002

Pontypridd (Wales)	25–20	(Scotland) Glasgow
Try: Jason Lewis; Con: Nicky Little; Pen: Nicky Little (5); Ceri Sweeney	Preview; Preview; Report; Report; Report	Try: Andrew Henderson; Rory Kerr; Con: Tommy Hayes (2); Pen: Tommy Hayes (2)

Sardis Road
Attendance: 3000
Referee: Phil Fear (Llanharan)

==== Slot 19 ====
22 February 2002

Edinburgh (Scotland)	13–13	(Scotland) Glasgow
Try: Derrick Lee; Martin Leslie; Pen: Brendan Laney	Preview; Report	Try: Alan Bulloch; Con: Tommy Hayes; Pen: Tommy Hayes (2)

Myreside
Attendance: 2732
Referee: Rob Dickson (Madras College FP)

==== Slot 20 ====
8 March 2002

Pontypridd (Wales)	17–12	(Wales) Neath

9 March 2002

Caerphilly (Wales)	21–34	(Wales) Bridgend

9 March 2002

Cardiff (Wales)	26–16	(Wales) Ebbw Vale

9 March 2002

Newport (Wales)	55–5	(Scotland) Glasgow
Try: Peter Buxton; Jason Forster; Adrian Garvey; Andrew Powell; Rod Snow; Ofisa Tonu'u (3); Matthew Watkins; Con: Shane Howarth (5)	Preview; Report; Report; Report; Report	Try: Jonathan Stuart

Rodney Parade
Attendance: 6820
Referee: Paul Adams (Ebbw Vale)

9 March 2002

Swansea (Wales)	22–27	(Scotland) Edinburgh

==== Slot 21 ====
15 March 2002

Ebbw Vale (Wales)	22–32	(Wales) Newport

15 March 2002

Glasgow (Scotland)	20–27	(Wales) Neath
Try: Jon Petrie; Pen: Tommy Hayes (5)	Preview; Report	Try: Gareth Llewellyn; Nathan Bonner-Evans; Con: Lee Jarvis; Pen: Lee Jarvis (5)

Hughenden Stadium
Attendance: 2421
Referee: Iain Ramage (Berwick)

16 March 2002

Bridgend (Wales)	53–30	(Scotland) Edinburgh

16 March 2002

Llanelli (Wales)	62–18	(Wales) Caerphilly

16 March 2002

Pontypridd (Wales)	18–21	(Wales) Cardiff

==== Slot 22 ====
13 April 2002

Neath (Wales)	46–8	(Scotland) Glasgow
Try: Kevin James (4); Gareth Morris; Barry Williams; Dave Tiueti; Andrew Howell; Con: Lee Jarvis (3)	Preview; Report; Report; Report; Report; Report; Report	Try: Michael Bartlett; Con: Calvin Howarth; Pen: Calvin Howarth

The Gnoll
Attendance: 2000
Referee: Hugh Watkins (WRU)

==== Slot 23 ====
10 April 2002

Glasgow (Scotland)	21–16	(Wales) Bridgend
Try: Andrew Henderson; Glenn Metcalfe; Con: Graeme Kiddie; Pen: Calvin Howarth; Graeme Kiddie (2)	Preview; Report; Report; Report; Report	Try: Dafydd James; Con: Craig Warlow; Pen: Craig Warlow; Drop: Craig Warlow (2)

Hughenden Stadium
Referee: David Changleng (Gala)

16 April 2002

Llanelli (Wales)	26–20	(Wales) Pontypridd

17 April 2002

Cardiff (Wales)	27–16	(Wales) Caerphilly

17 April 2002

Newport (Wales)	20–36	(Wales) Neath

==== Slot 24 ====
19 April 2002

Edinburgh (Scotland)	32–10	(Wales) Cardiff

19 April 2002

Pontypridd (Wales)	32–13	(Wales) Bridgend

20 April 2002

Llanelli (Wales)	40–14	(Scotland) Glasgow
Try: Mark Jones (3); Leigh Davies; Salesi Finau; Con: Gareth Bowen (3); Pen: Gareth Bowen (3)	Preview; Report; Report	Try: Jon Steel; Pen: Calvin Howarth (3)

Stradey Park
Attendance: 3500
Referee: Colin Saunders (Wales)

20 April 2002

Neath (Wales)	50–8	(Wales) Ebbw Vale

20 April 2002

Swansea (Wales)	52–13	(Wales) Newport

==== Slot 25 ====
23 April 2002

Edinburgh (Scotland)	49–31	(Wales) Ebbw Vale

==== Slot 26 ====
26 April 2002

Newport (Wales)	14–17	(Wales) Cardiff

27 April 2002

Bridgend (Wales)	6–21	(Wales) Swansea

27 April 2002

Ebbw Vale (Wales)	18–37	(Scotland) Glasgow
Try: Rhys Shorney; Iestyn Thomas; Con: Gareth Cull; Pen: Gareth Cull (2)	Preview; Preview; Report; Report; Report	Try: Graeme Beveridge (2); Donnie Macfadyen (2); Glenn Metcalfe; Con: Tommy Hayes (2); Calvin Howarth; Pen: Tommy Hayes (2)

Eugene Cross Park
Attendance: 1200
Referee: Keri Evans (WRU)

27 April 2002

Neath (Wales)	36–3	(Wales) Edinburgh

==== Slot 27 ====
3 May 2002

Edinburgh (Scotland)	40–8	(Wales) Llanelli

3 May 2002

Glasgow (Scotland)	26–28	(Wales) Newport
Try: Calvin Howarth; Rory Kerr; Roland Reid; Con: Tommy Hayes; Pen: Tommy Hayes; Calvin Howarth (2)	Preview; Report; Report	Try: Llyr Lane; Matt Mostyn (2); Con: Shane Howarth (2); Pen: Shane Howarth; Jason Strange (2)

Hughenden Stadium
Attendance: 2500
Referee: John Hogg (Hawick)

3 May 2002

Neath (Wales)	47–14	(Wales) Pontypridd

4 May 2002

Bridgend (Wales)	33–24	(Wales) Caerphilly

4 May 2002

Swansea (Wales)	24–20	(Wales) Cardiff

==== Slot 28 ====
7 May 2002

Caerphilly (Wales)	6–54	(Wales) Llanelli

7 May 2002

Cardiff (Wales)	47–27	(Wales) Bridgend

7 May 2002

Swansea (Wales)	20–16	(Wales) Neath

8 May 2002

Newport (Wales)	34–23	(Wales) Pontypridd

==== Slot 29 ====
10 May 2002

Cardiff (Wales)	25–28	(Wales) Llanelli

10 May 2002

Ebbw Vale (Wales)	66–20	(Wales) Caerphilly

10 May 2002

Glasgow (Scotland)	37–20	(Wales) Swansea
Try: Jon Steel; Kenny Sinclair; Jon Petrie; Con: Tommy Hayes; Calvin Howarth; Pen: Tommy Hayes (5); Drop: James McLaren	Preview; Report; Report; Report	Try: Matt Taylor; Nik Witkowski; Selilio Martens; Con: Gavin Henson; Pen: Gavin Henson

Hughenden Stadium
Attendance: 3560
Referee: Andy Ireland (Edinburgh Referees Society)

11 May 2002

Newport (Wales)	38–29	(Wales) Bridgend

11 May 2002

Pontypridd (Wales)	59–27	(Scotland) Edinburgh
