= 2003–04 Glasgow Warriors season =

Sports season

Glasgow Warriors 2003 / 2004
- Ground: Hughenden Stadium (Capacity: 6,000)
- Coach: (Scotland) Hugh Campbell
- Captain: (Scotland) Cameron Mather
- Most caps: (Scotland) Sean Lamont (Scotland) Andrew Hall (28)
- Top scorer: (Scotland) Dan Parks (214)
- Most tries: (Scotland) Sean Lamont (11)
- League: 2003–04 Celtic League
- 11th
1st kit	2nd kit

The 2003–04 season is the eighth in the history of the Glasgow Warriors as a professional side. During this season the young professional side competed as Glasgow Rugby.

The 2003–04 season saw Glasgow Rugby compete in the competitions: the Celtic League; the European Challenge Cup, the Parker Pen Challenge Cup for sponsorship reasons; and the inaugural Celtic Cup.

== Team ==
=== Coaches ===
- Head coach: (Scotland) Hugh Campbell
- Assistant coach: (Scotland) Shade Munro
- Assistant coach: (Scotland) Sean Lineen

=== Staff ===
- Chairman: George Blackie
- Chief executive: David Jordan
- Media Manager: Bill McMurtrie
- Team Facilitator: Dougie Mills
- Sales & Marketing Executive: Gordon Hood
- Administration Manager: Diane Murphy
- Team doctor: Gerry Haggerty
- Physiotherapists: Bob Stewart, Fiona Shanks

=== Squad ===
Hookers (Scotland) Gordon Bulloch (New Zealand) Simon Gunn (Scotland) Scott Lawson Props (Scotland) Chris Birchall (Scotland) Alan Brown (Scotland) Lee Harrison (Scotland) Andrew Kelly (Scotland) Euan Murray (Scotland) Matt Proudfoot Locks (England) Joe Beardshaw (Scotland) Andrew Hall (Scotland) Nathan Ross	Loose forwards (Scotland) Paul Dearlove (Scotland) Donnie Macfadyen (Scotland) Cameron Mather (Scotland) Rory McKay (Scotland) Jon Petrie (Scotland) Roland Reid (Scotland) Andrew Wilson Scrum halves (Scotland) Graeme Beveridge (Scotland) Richard McKnight (Scotland) Mark McMillan (Scotland) Sam Pinder (Scotland) Kenny Sinclair Fly halves (Scotland) Calvin Howarth (Scotland) Dan Parks	Centres (Scotland) Alan Bulloch (Scotland) Andrew Henderson (Scotland) Graeme Morrison (New Zealand) Joe Naufahu Back Three (Scotland) Rory Kerr (Scotland) Sean Lamont (England) Gareth Maclure (Scotland) Glenn Metcalfe (Scotland) Dave Millard (Scotland) Stuart Moffat (Scotland) Jon Steel

==== Academy players ====
Glasgow had a number of academy players this season. Each player was teamed with a mentor.

- Alan Auld (wing/full back, Grangemouth) with Sean Lamont
- Cameron McCulloch (full back/stand-off, Hillhead/Jordanhill) with Stuart Moffat
- Greig Sinclair (full back, Allan Glen's) with Rory Kerr
- Fraser Duguid (outside centre, Dalziel) with Alan Bulloch
- Iain Kennedy (inside centre, GHA) with Joe Naufahu
- Alistair Miller (scrum-half, GHA) with Sam Pinder
- Andrew Reekie (prop, Hutchesons' Grammar School) with Matt Proudfoot
- Willie Brown (prop, Hillhead/Jordanhill) with Lee Harrison
- Bobby Agnew (prop, Hillhead/Jordanhill) with Euan Murray
- Andrew Noble (hooker, Whitecraigs) with Simon Gunn
- Donald Malcolm (hooker, GHA) with Scott Lawson
- Chris Love (flanker, West Of Scotland) with Andrew Wilson
- James Eddie (lock/flanker, GHA) with Andrew Hall
- Stuart Rose (flanker, Hillhead/Jordanhill) with Donnie Macfadyen
- Blake Whitehead (No.8, Dalziel) with Rory McKay
- Calum Forrester (No.8, Hutchesons' Grammar School) with Paul Dearlove

==== Back up players ====
Glasgow also had a roll of back-up players from various clubs:

- (Scotland) Ricky Munday (Glasgow Hawks)
- (Scotland) Colin Shaw (Glasgow Hawks)
- (Scotland) Wes Henry (Glasgow Hawks)
- (Scotland) Eric Milligan (Glasgow Hawks)
- (Scotland) Richard Maxton (Glasgow Hawks)
- (Scotland) Steve Swindall (Glasgow Hawks)
- (Scotland) Greg Francis (Glasgow Hawks)
- (Scotland) Neil McKenzie (Glasgow Hawks)
- (Scotland) Gordon Sykes (Ayr)
- (Australia) Damien Kelly (Ayr)
- (Australia) Nick Lavell (Ayr)
- (Australia) Rod Seib (Aberdeen Grammar School FP)
- Fergus Thomson (West of Scotland)
- (Scotland) Mark Thomson (Kirkcaldy)
- (Scotland) David Arneil (Heriot's FP)
- (Scotland) Colin Gregor (Watsonians)
- (Scotland) Rory Couper (Boroughmuir)
- (Scotland) Fergus Pringle (Hawick)
- (Scotland) John Stewart (Stirling County)
- (Scotland) Olly Brown (Boroughmuir)
- (Scotland) Graham Kiddie (Boroughmuir)
- (Scotland) Jamie Syme (Heriot's)
- (Scotland) Ian Dryburgh (Watsonians)
- (Scotland) Chris Sinclair (Heriot's)
- (Scotland) Danny Wright (Watsonians)
- (Scotland) Jamie Fowlie (Forrester)
- (Scotland) Colin Whitaker (Dundee HSFP)
- (Australia) Mark Sitch (Glasgow Hawks)

== Player statistics ==
During the 2003–04 season, Glasgow have used 36 different players in competitive games. The table below shows the number of appearances and points scored by each player.

Pos.	Nation	Name	Celtic League			Celtic Cup			Challenge Cup			Total	
Pos.	Nation	Name	Apps (sub)	Tries	Points kicked	Apps (sub)	Tries	Points kicked	Apps (sub)	Tries	Points kicked	Apps (sub)	Total Pts
HK	(Scotland)	Gordon Bulloch	6(1)	2	0	0	0	0	4	1	0	10(1)	15
HK	(New Zealand)	Simon Gunn	8(2)	0	0	2	0	0	0	0	0	10(2)	0
HK	(Scotland)	Scott Lawson	10(9)	1	0	1(2)	0	0	(2)	0	0	11(13)	5
PR	(Scotland)	Chris Birchall	(1)	0	0	0	0	0	0	0	0	(1)	0
PR	(Scotland)	Lee Harrison	10(2)	1	0	3	0	0	1(2)	0	0	14(4)	5
PR	(Scotland)	Andrew Kelly	10{3)	0	0	1(1)	0	0	2(2)	0	0	13(6)	0
PR	(Scotland)	Euan Murray	15(5)	0	0	1(2)	0	0	3	0	0	19(7)	5
PR	(Scotland)	Matt Proudfoot	6(4)	0	0	1	0	0	1	0	0	8(4)	0
LK	(England)	Joe Beardshaw	12(5)	3	0	1(2)	0	0	(2)	0	0	13(9)	15
LK	(Scotland)	Andrew Hall	15(6)	1	3	3	0	0	4	0	0	22(6)	8
LK	(Scotland)	Nathan Ross	17	0	0	2(1)	0	0	4	0	0	23(1)	0
BR	(Scotland)	Paul Dearlove	12(2)	0	0	2(1)	1	0	(1)	0	0	14(5)	5
BR	(Scotland)	Donnie Macfadyen	20	1	0	2	0	0	4	1	0	26	10
BR	(Scotland)	Rory McKay	1(8)	1	0	0	0	0	(2)	0	0	1(10)	5
BR	(Scotland)	Jon Petrie	10	0	0	0	0	0	4	0	0	14	0
BR	(Scotland)	Roland Reid	10(8)	0	0	1	0	0	0	0	0	11(8)	0
BR	(Australia)	Mark Sitch	(2)	0	0	0	0	0	0	0	0	(2)	0
BR	(Scotland)	Andrew Wilson	7(2)	2	0	1	0	0	0	0	0	8(2)	10
SH	(Scotland)	Graeme Beveridge	7(7)	0	0	0	0	0	4	0	0	11(7)	0
SH	(Scotland)	Mark McMillan	1(3)	0	0	1	0	0	0	0	0	2(3)	0
SH	(Scotland)	Sam Pinder	10(5)	5	0	1	0	0	(2)	1	0	11(7)	30
SH	(Scotland)	Kenny Sinclair	4(2)	0	0	1	0	0	0	0	0	5(2)	0
FH	(Scotland)	Colin Gregor	1(1)	1	4	0	0	0	0	0	0	1(1)	9
FH	(Scotland)	Calvin Howarth	10(7)	0	51	1(1)	1	11	(1)	0	5	11(9)	72
FH	(Scotland)	Dan Parks	11(4)	4	118	2(1)	0	14	4	0	52	17(5)	214
CE	(Scotland)	Alan Bulloch	9(3)	5	0	2	0	0	0	0	0	11(3)	25
CE	(Scotland)	Andrew Henderson	8	0	0	0	0	0	4	1	0	12	5
CE	(Scotland)	Graeme Morrison	20	3	0	1	1	0	2	0	0	23	20
CE	(New Zealand)	Joe Naufahu	2	0	0	0	0	0	0	0	0	2	0
WG	(Scotland)	Sean Lamont	19(2)	8	0	2(1)	0	0	4	3	0	25(3)	55
WG	(England)	Gareth Maclure	4(3)	1	0	3	0	0	4	0	0	11(3)	5
WG	(Scotland)	Glenn Metcalfe	12(1)	2	0	0	0	0	0	0	0	12(1)	10
WG	(Scotland)	Dave Millard	4(5)	2	0	2	0	0	0	0	0	6(5)	10
WG	(Scotland)	Jon Steel	5(1)	0	0	1(1)	0	0	0	0	0	6(2)	0
FB	(Scotland)	Rory Kerr	15	4	0	2	1	0	3(1)	1	0	20(1)	30
FB	(Scotland)	Stuart Moffat	10(1)	1	5	2	0	0	4(1)	0	0	16(2)	10

== Staff movements ==
=== Coaches ===
Head Strength Coach – Ross Macleod

==== Personnel In ====
None.

==== Personnel Out ====
None.

== Competitions ==
=== Pre-season and friendlies ===
==== Match 1 ====
14 August 2003

Gloucester Rugby (England)	28–12	(Scotland) Glasgow
Try: John Goodridge; Jake Boer; Will Matthews; Con: Henry Paul; Rory Teague; Pen: Henry Paul (3)	Preview; Preview; Report; Report	Try: Colin Shaw; Graeme Morrison; Con: Calvin Howarth

Kingsholm Stadium
Attendance: 10,000

Glasgow: Alan Bulloch, Calvin Howarth, Sean Lamont, Gareth Maclure, Mark McMillan, David Millard, Stuart Moffat, Graeme Morrison, Joe Naufahu, Sam Pinder, Colin Shaw, Kenny Sinclair, Jon Steel, Joe Beardshaw, Alan Brown, Paul Dearlove, Simon Gunn, Andrew Hall, Andrew Kelly, Scott Lawson, Donnie Macfadyen, Cameron Mather, Rory McKay, Eric Milligan, Euan Murray, Matt Proudfoot, Roland Reid, Nathan Ross and Andrew Wilson.
Gloucester:

==== Match 2 ====
22 August 2003

Glasgow (Scotland)	22–19	(England) Newcastle Falcons
Try: Calvin Howarth; Alan Bulloch; Jon Steel; Con: Calvin Howarth (2); Pen: Calvin Howarth	Preview; Report; Report	Try: Stephenson; Gollings (2); Con: Gollings (2)

Hughenden Stadium
Attendance: 2000
Referee: I Ramage (Berwick)

Glasgow: Stuart Moffat; Gareth Maclure, Graeme Morrison, Alan Bulloch, Sean Lamont; Calvin Howarth, Sam Pinder; Euan Murray, Simon Gunn, Matt Proudfoot, Andrew Hall, Nathan Ross, Cameron Mather (captain), Donnie Macfadyen, Paul Dearlove. Replacements – Joe Beardshaw, Lee Harrison, Andrew Kelly, Scott Lawson, Rory McKay, David Millard, Roland Reid, Kenny Sinclair, Jon Steel, Andrew Wilson.
Newcastle: J Shaw; A Cadwallader, M Shaw, M Mayerhofler, M Stephenson; B Gollings, H Charlton; M Ward, M Thompson, M Hurter, J Parling, C Hamilton, E Taione, W Britz, H Vyvyan. Replacements used: J Grindall, N Makin, T May, I Peel, O Phillips, S Richardson, M Wilkinson, D Wilson, B Woods

==== Match 3 ====
2 February 2004

Scotland U21	0–43	(Scotland) Glasgow
	Preview; Report; Report	Try: Rory Couper (2); Glenn Metcalfe; Kenny Sinclair; Olly Brown; Colin Gregor; Jamie Fowlie; Con: Colin Gregor (4)

Murrayfield Stadium
Referee: Andy Ireland (SRU)

Scotland U21: Brian Archibald (Stirling County); Nick De Luca (Heriot's), Alan Nash (Watsonians), Iain Berthinussen (Gala), Colin Shaw (Glasgow Hawks); Andy McLean (Gala), Brendan McKerchar (Melrose) captain; Robert Blake (Birmingham University), Fergus Thomson (Glasgow Hawks and Scottish Institute of Sport), Willie Aitken (Peebles), Peter Wilmshurst-Smith (Gloucester), Colin White (Stirling County), Alasdair Strokosch (Boroughmuir and Scottish Institute of Sport), Grant Strang (Aberdeen GSFP), Mark Cairns (Loughborough University).
Replacements – Calum Brown (Boroughmuir), John Cox (Boroughmuir), Mark Hunter (Stirling County), Stuart Johnson (Melrose), Jonathan White (Heriot's and Scottish Institute of Sport), Neil Cochrane (Watsonians), Richard Snedden (Boroughmuir), Stephen Gordon (Glasgow Hawks and Scottish Institute of Sport), Stephen Jones (Newcastle Falcons)
Glasgow: Glenn Metcalfe (captain); David Millard, David Arneil (Heriot's), Joe Naufahu, Rory Couper (Boroughmuir); Colin Gregor (Watsonians), Sam Pinder; Mark Thomson (Kirkcaldy), Simon Gunn, Matt Proudfoot, Fergus Pringle (Hawick), John Stewart (Stirling County), Andrew Wilson, Paul Dearlove, Olly Brown (Boroughmuir).
Replacements – Graham Kiddie (Boroughmuir), Alan Bulloch, Kenny Sinclair, Jamie Syme (Heriot's), Roland Reid, Ian Dryburgh (Watsonians), Chris Sinclair (Heriot's), Danny Wright (Watsonians), Jamie Fowlie (Forrester).

=== European Challenge Cup ===
==== Results ====
===== Round 1 =====
6 December 2003
18:00

Montpellier (France)	11–30	(Scotland) Glasgow
Try: John Daniell; Pen: Jérémy Valls (2)	Preview; Report; Report; Report	Try: Sean Lamont; Donnie Macfadyen; Sam Pinder; Con: Dan Parks (3); Pen: Dan Parks (2); Drop: Dan Parks

Stade Sabathé
Attendance: 500
Referee: Simon McDowell (Ireland)

12 December 2003
19:30

Glasgow (Scotland)	38–13	(France) Montpellier
Try: Andrew Henderson; Sean Lamont (2); Gordon Bulloch; Con: Dan Parks (3); Pen: Dan Parks (4)	Preview; Report; Report; Report	Try: Thierry Gras; Con: Jérémy Valls; Pen: Jérémy Valls (2)

Hughenden Stadium
Attendance: 1,622
Referee: Antonio Lombardi (Italy)

===== Round 2 =====
11 January 2004
15:00

Saracens (England)	37–6	(Scotland) Glasgow
Try: Thomas Castaignède (2); Kyran Bracken; Ben T. Russell; Robbie Russell; Con: Thomas Castaignède (3); Pen: Thomas Castaignède (2)	Preview; Report; Report; Report	Pen: Dan Parks (2)

Vicarage Road
Attendance: 3,653
Referee: Christophe Berdos (France)

16 January 2004
19:30

Glasgow (Scotland)	33–5	(England) Saracens
Try: Rory Kerr; Andrew Henderson; Cameron Mather; Con: Dan Parks (2); Calvin Howarth; Pen: Dan Parks (3); Calvin Howarth	Preview; Report; Report; Report	Try: Morgan Williams

Hughenden Stadium
Attendance: 2,645
Referee: Didier Mene (France)

Glasgow Warriors lost on aggregate and were knocked out of the Challenge Cup.

=== Celtic League ===
==== League table ====
	Team	Pld	W	D	L	PF	PA	PD	TF	TA	Try bonus	Losing bonus	Pts
1	(Wales) Llanelli Scarlets	22	16	1	5	597	385	+212	57	39	7	3	76
2	(Ireland) Ulster	22	15	0	7	617	363	+254	67	29	8	4	72
3	(Wales) Newport Gwent Dragons	22	16	0	6	590	449	+141	59	41	7	1	72
4	(Wales) Celtic Warriors	22	14	0	8	560	451	+109	48	37	5	4	65
5	(Wales) Neath–Swansea Ospreys	22	11	1	10	582	512	+70	55	60	5	4	55
6	(Wales) Cardiff Blues	22	11	0	11	570	467	+103	73	54	7	3	54
7	(Ireland) Munster	22	10	0	12	422	456	−34	45	49	6	5	51
8	(Ireland) Leinster	22	9	1	12	523	580	−57	51	65	4	5	47
9	(Ireland) Connacht	22	8	2	12	479	550	−71	50	59	5	3	44
10	(Scotland) Edinburgh	22	9	0	13	454	622	−168	52	69	6	2	44
11	(Scotland) Glasgow	22	6	1	15	442	614	−172	52	61	3	3	32
12	(Scotland) Borders	22	4	0	18	363	750	−387	42	88	1	5	22
Under the standard bonus point system, points are awarded as follows: 4 points for a win; 2 points for a draw; 1 bonus point for scoring 4 tries (or more) (Try bonus); 1 bonus point for losing by 7 points (or fewer) (Losing bonus)
Source: RaboDirect PRO12

==== Results ====
===== Round 1 =====
5 September 2003
19:30

Glasgow (Scotland)	23–13	(Wales) Cardiff Blues
Try: Euan Murray; Gareth Maclure; Sam Pinder; Con: Calvin Howarth; Pen: Calvin Howarth; Drop: Calvin Howarth	Preview; Report; Report; Report	Try: Nick Macleod; Con: Nicky Robinson; Pen: Nicky Robinson

Hughenden Stadium
Attendance: 3,264
Referee: David McHugh (Ireland)

===== Round 2 =====
12 September 2003
19:35

Ulster (Ireland)	33–6	(Scotland) Glasgow
Try: Andy Ward; Shane Stewart; Rowan Frost; Con: Adam Larkin (3); Pen: Adam Larkin (4)	Preview; Report; Report; Report	Pen: Calvin Howarth; Drop: Stuart Moffat

Ravenhill
Attendance: 6,000
Referee: Nigel Whitehouse (Wales)
replaced after 17 mins by
David Keane (Ulster)

===== Round 3 =====
26 September 2003
19:35

Glasgow (Scotland)	19–30	(Ireland) Connacht
Try: Joe Beardshaw; Lee Harrison; Graeme Morrison; Con: Dan Parks (2)	Preview; Report; Report; Report	Try: Matt Mostyn; Mike Walls; Conor McPhillips; Con: Mark McHugh (3); Pen: Mark McHugh (3)

Hughenden Stadium
Attendance: 3,146
Referee: Nigel Owens (Wales)

===== Round 4 =====
12 October 2003
14:30

Newport Gwent Dragons (Wales)	27–5	(Scotland) Glasgow
Try: Jason Forster; Rhys Thomas; Con: Craig Warlow; Pen: Craig Warlow (5)	Preview; Report; Report; Report	Try: Sean Lamont

Rodney Parade
Attendance: 3,198
Referee: Simon McDowell (Ireland)

===== Round 5 =====
17 October 2003
19:30

Glasgow (Scotland)	26–25	(Scotland) Borders
Try: Roland Reid; Sean Lamont; Con: Dan Parks (2); Pen: Dan Parks (4)	Preview; Report; Report; Report	Try: Gareth Morton; Con: Gareth Morton; Pen: Gareth Morton (5); Drop: Clark Laidlaw

Hughenden Stadium
Attendance: 2,712
Referee: Paul Adams (Wales)

===== Round 6 =====
24 October 2003
19:30

Munster (Ireland)	26–10	(Scotland) Glasgow
Try: David Wallace; Mike Mullins; Con: Jeremy Staunton (2); Pen: Jeremy Staunton (4)	Preview; Report; Report; Report	Try: Stuart Moffat; Graeme Morrison

Musgrave Park
Attendance: 2,000
Referee: Hugh Watkins (Wales)

===== Round 7 =====
31 October 2003
19:30

Glasgow (Scotland)	10–31	(Ireland) Leinster
Try: Rory McKay; Con: Calvin Howarth; Pen: Dan Parks	Preview; Report; Report; Report	Try: Gordon D'Arcy; Peter McKenna; Aidan Kearney; Con: Brian O'Meara (2); Pen: Brian O'Meara (4)

Hughenden Stadium
Attendance: 2,734
Referee: Nigel Owens (Wales)

===== Round 8 =====
7 November 2003
19:15

Celtic Warriors (Wales)	29–23	(Scotland) Glasgow
Try: Gareth Wyatt; Chris Horsman; Con: Neil Jenkins (2); Pen: Neil Jenkins (5)	Preview; Report; Report; Report	Try: Alan Bulloch; Sam Pinder; Con: Calvin Howarth; Dan Parks; Pen: Calvin Howarth; Dan Parks; Drop: Andrew Hall

Brewery Field
Attendance: 1,950
Referee: Tony Redmond (Ireland)

===== Round 9 =====
28 November 2003
19:30

Glasgow (Scotland)	18–31	(Wales) Llanelli Scarlets
Try: Joe Beardshaw; Sean Lamont; Con: Calvin Howarth; Pen: Calvin Howarth (2)	Preview; Report; Report; Report	Try: John Davies; Tal Selley; Lee Byrne; Con: Stephen Jones (2); Pen: Stephen Jones (4)

Hughenden Stadium
Attendance: 2,345
Referee: Alan Lewis (Ireland)

===== Round 10 =====
27 December 2003
14:00

Glasgow (Scotland)	16–25	(Scotland) Edinburgh
Try: Andrew Hall; Con: Dan Parks; Pen: Dan Parks (2); Drop: Dan Parks	Preview; Report; Report; Report	Try: Tom Philip; Con: Brendan Laney; Pen: Brendan Laney (4); Drop: Brendan Laney (2)

Hughenden Stadium
Attendance: 4,384
Referee: Iain Ramage (Berwick)

===== Round 11 =====
6 February 2004
19:15

Neath-Swansea Ospreys (Wales)	33–11	(Scotland) Glasgow
Try: Shaun Connor; Dave Tiueti; Gavin Henson; Con: Gavin Henson (3); Pen: Gavin Henson (4)	Preview; Report; Report; Report	Try: Colin Gregor; Pen: Dan Parks (2)

The Gnoll
Attendance: 2,675
Referee: Olan Trevor (Ireland)

===== Round 12 =====
13 February 2004
19:05

Cardiff Blues (Wales)	29–19	(Scotland) Glasgow
Try: Nick Walne; Nicky Robinson; Jonny Vaughton (2); Con: Nicky Robinson (3); Pen: Nicky Robinson	Preview; Report; Report; Report	Try: Alan Bulloch (2); Joe Beardshaw; Con: Colin Gregor

Cardiff Arms Park
Attendance: 4,000
Referee: Alistair McKay (Ireland)

===== Round 13 =====
20 February 2004
19:30

Glasgow (Scotland)	27–25	(Ireland) Ulster
Try: Alan Bulloch; Sean Lamont; Scott Lawson; Con: Calvin Howarth (3); Pen: Calvin Howarth (2)	Preview; Report; Report; Report	Try: Matt McCullough; Neil Best; Scott Young; Con: Paddy Wallace (2); Pen: Adam Larkin (2)

Hughenden Stadium
Attendance: 3,189
Referee: Nigel Owens (Wales)

===== Round 14 =====
28 February 2004
14:30

Connacht (Ireland)	28–28	(Scotland) Glasgow
Try: Mark McHugh; Conor McPhillips (2); Con: Eric Elwood (2); Pen: Eric Elwood (3)	Preview; Report; Report; Report	Try: Glenn Metcalfe; Alan Bulloch; Sean Lamont; Con: Dan Parks (2); Pen: Calvin Howarth (3)

Sportsground
Attendance: 2,500
Referee: Hugh Watkins (Wales)

===== Round 15 =====
5 March 2004
19:30

Glasgow (Scotland)	48–20	(Wales) Newport Gwent Dragons
Try: Rory Kerr (2); Donnie Macfadyen; Roland Reid; Dan Parks; Dave Millard; Sam Pinder; Con: Dan Parks (5); Pen: Dan Parks	Preview; Report; Report; Report	Try: Percy Montgomery; Pen: Percy Montgomery (5)

Hughenden Stadium
Attendance: 2,860
Referee: Alain Rolland (Ireland)

===== Round 16 =====
12 March 2004
19:30

Borders (Scotland)	11–15	(Scotland) Glasgow
Try: Gareth Morton; Pen: Tanner Vili; Calum MacRae	Preview; Report; Report; Report	Try: Alan Bulloch; Sean Lamont; Con: Calvin Howarth; Pen: Calvin Howarth

Netherdale
Attendance: 1,650
Referee: Phil Fear (Wales)

===== Round 17 =====
26 March 2004
19:35

Glasgow (Scotland)	12–37	(Ireland) Munster
Try: Rory Kerr; Graeme Morrison; Con: Stuart Moffat	Preview; Report; Report; Report	Try: Rob Henderson; John Kelly; Martin McPhail; Mossy Lawler; Barry Murphy; Con: Mossy Lawlor (3); Pen: Mossy Lawlor (2)

Hughenden Stadium
Attendance: 2,645
Referee: David R. Davies (Wales)

===== Round 18 =====
2 April 2004
19:30

Leinster (Ireland)	31–30	(Scotland) Glasgow
Try: James Norton; James Downey; Ben Gissing; Con: Brian O'Meara (2); Pen: Brian O'Meara (4)	Report; Report; Report; Report	Try: Gordon Bulloch; Glenn Metcalfe; Dan Parks; Con: Dan Parks (3); Pen: Dan Parks (3)

Donnybrook
Attendance: 3,655
Referee: Nigel Williams (Wales)

===== Round 19 =====
16 April 2004
19:30

Glasgow (Scotland)	19–44	(Wales) Celtic Warriors
Try: Rory Kerr; Con: Dan Parks; Pen: Dan Parks (4)	Preview; Report; Report; Report	Try: Gareth Cooper; Dafydd James; Gareth Wyatt; Richard Bryan; Brent Cockbain; Sonny Parker; Con: Neil Jenkins (2); Ceri Sweeney (2); Pen: Neil Jenkins; Ceri Sweeney

Hughenden Stadium
Attendance: 2,863
Referee: Simon McDowell (Ireland)

===== Round 20 =====
1 May 2004
17:30

Llanelli Scarlets (Wales)	36–26	(Scotland) Glasgow
Try: Chris Wyatt; Dave Hodges; Dwayne Peel (2); Con: Stephen Jones (2); Pen: Stephen Jones (3); Gareth Bowen	Preview; Report; Report; Report	Try: Andrew Henderson; Sean Lamont; Dave Millard; Sam Pinder; Con: Dan Parks (3)

Racecourse Ground
Attendance: 5,422
Referee: Donal Courtney (Ireland)

===== Round 21 =====
7 May 2004
19:30

Edinburgh (Scotland)	19–17	(Scotland) Glasgow
Try: Marcus Di Rollo; Andrew Dall; Joel Brannigan; Con: Ali Warnock (2)	Preview; Report; Report; Report	Try: Dan Parks; Sam Pinder; Con: Dan Parks (2); Pen: Dan Parks

Meadowbank Stadium
Attendance: 3,036
Referee: Nigel Owens (Wales)

===== Round 22 =====
14 May 2004
19:30

Glasgow (Scotland)	34–31	(Wales) Neath-Swansea Ospreys
Try: Dan Parks; Sean Lamont; Andy Wilson; Con: Dan Parks (4); Pen: Dan Parks (2)	Preview; Report; Report; Report	Try: Duncan Jones; Andy Newman; Jonathan Thomas; Richie Pugh; Con: Gavin Henson (4); Pen: Gavin Henson

Hughenden Stadium
Attendance: 2,227
Referee: David McHugh (Ireland)

=== Celtic Cup ===
==== Results ====
===== Round 1 =====
19 September 2003
19:05

Celtic Warriors (Wales)	9–19	(Scotland) Glasgow
Pen: Neil Jenkins (3)	Preview; Report; Report; Report	Try: Calvin Howarth; Cameron Mather; Pen: Calvin Howarth (3)

Brewery Field
Attendance: 2560
Referee: Alan Lewis (Ireland)

===== Quarter-final =====
3 October 2003
19:30

Glasgow (Scotland)	18-14	(Ireland) Munster
Try: Rory Kerr; Paul Dearlove; Con: Dan Parks; Pen: Dan Parks (2)	Preview; Report; Report	Try: Mike Mullins; Simon Kerr; Con: Jeremy Staunton (2)

Hughenden Stadium
Attendance: 2942
Referee: Hugh Watkins (Wales)

===== Semi-final =====
14 November 2003
19:30

Glasgow (Scotland)	13–20	(Ireland) Ulster
Try: Graeme Morrison; Con: Calvin Howarth; Pen: Dan Parks; Drop: Dan Parks	Preview; Report; Report; Report	Try: Ryan Constable; Pen: Adam Larkin (4); Drop: Adam Larkin

Hughenden Stadium
Attendance: 4128
Referee: Hugh Watkins (Wales)

== End-of-season awards ==
Award	Winner
Player of the Season	(Scotland) Glenn Metcalfe
Young Player of the Season	(Scotland) James Eddie
