= Dearlove =

Dearlove is a surname. Notable people with the surname include:

- Alfred Dearlove (1869–1955), English cricketer
- Des Dearlove (born 1963), British journalist and business theorist
- Jack Dearlove (1911–1967), English rower
- Paul Dearlove (born 1979), Scottish rugby union player
- Richard Dearlove (born 1945), British intelligence officer
