= Simon Gunn =

Simon Gunn may refer to:

- Simon Gunn (rugby union)
- Simon Gunn (historian)
