= Nathan Ross =

Nathan Ross may refer to:

- Nathan Ross (producer), American film and television producer
- Nathan Ross (rugby league), Australian rugby league player
- Nathan Ross (rugby union), Australian rugby union player who played for Scotland

== See also ==
- Nathan Ross Margold, Romanian-born American lawyer
