= Tom McLaren =

Scottish rugby union footballer

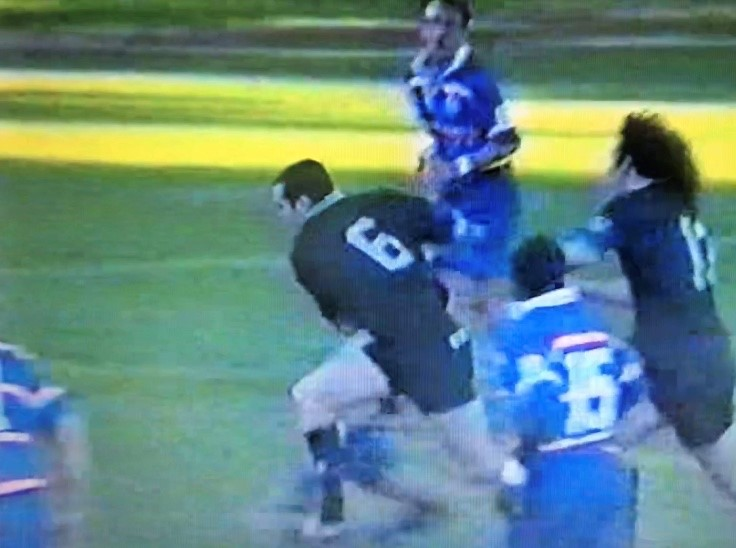
- Tom McLaren - Penrith Emus vs Easts 1999
- Born: Tom McLaren; 10 April 1979 (age 47) Stirling, Scotland
- Height: 6 ft 3 in (1.91 m)
- Weight: 102 kg (16 st 1 lb)
- School: St Stanislaus College, Bathurst
- University: University of Southern Queensland; University of New England; Griffith University; University of Western Sydney
- Notable relative(s): James McLaren, brother

Rugby union career
- Position: Flanker
Amateur team(s)
Years	Team	Apps	(Points)
1994-1998	Bathurst Bulldogs		
2009-2011	UQ Gatton Black Pigs		
2014-2015	JCU Mariners		
2016-2017	New York Athletic Club		
Senior career
Years	Team	Apps	(Points)
1997-2002	Stirling County		
1999-2001	Penrith Emus Rugby		
2001-2002	Glasgow Warriors		
2003-2004	Blaydon RFC		
2004-2005	Darlington Mowden Park		
2006-2007	Souths Rugby		
International career
Years	Team	Apps	(Points)
2000-2001	Australian Sevens		
2000-2001	Australian Barbarians		
2001-2002	Scottish Development Team		

Tom McLaren (born 10 April 1979 in Stirling, Scotland) is a Scottish former rugby union player who played for Glasgow Warriors at the Flanker position, and played in representative teams for both Australia and Scotland.

McLaren joined Glasgow from Penrith Emus Rugby in Sydney, Australia, where he captained the club, aged 20, in the New South Wales Rugby Union Shute Shield competition, under the guidance of Head Coach Scott Johnson.

Like his brother James McLaren, he was born in Stirling and moved to Australia when his parents emigrated. He was 4 weeks old at the time.

As teenager during one of his visits back to Scotland, he played for Stirling County in a Scottish Cup tie. "When I finished secondary school I came back and played with Stirling and that gave me a chance to get a feel of what it's like here" he said.

In Australia, he earned representative honours with the Australian All States Under 21s, New South Wales Waratahs Under 21s, New South Wales Country Cockatoos, Australian Rugby Legends, and the Australian Barbarians. He was also selected in the 2001 Australian Sevens squad and played with that side in the Papua New Guinea (PNG) Sevens Tournament, but this did not affect his potential to play for Scotland - "It was a 20 man squad and I went over with them to the PNG tournament, but we went as the Australian Barbarians, so it did not commit me [to Australian Rugby]" he said. "I checked that out with them and was told that if I had played in the World Sevens circuit then I would have been Australian as far as rugby commitment goes. However, while I definitely wanted to do as much as I possibly could in Australian rugby, this was always the way I wanted to go. It was always my priority to come back to Scotland and play".

McLaren's first start for Glasgow was against Cardiff RFC. He made further appearances for Glasgow in the Welsh-Scottish League that year.

McLaren stayed with Glasgow through season 2001-02, during which time he also played a number of tests for the Scottish Development side. He was signed by Blaydon RFC, and also worked as a Rugby Development Officer for the English Rugby Union in the North-East of England, delivering social inclusion projects.

In 2004 season, McLaren moved from Blaydon to play for Darlington Mowden Park. Over two years playing and captaining Mowden, he also played regularly with the Newcastle Falcons Academy side.

As a Rugby Development Officer in Newcastle, McLaren assisted colleague Matt Bryan in founding the junior arm of the West End Academicals Rugby Club. He worked in schools throughout the region. North-East Rugby Development Manager Matt Carter gave McLaren a glowing recommendation - "There is one school in the patch where 20 different languages are spoken, so diverse is the community. But Tom, with his Aussie accent and dreadlocked hairdo, easily adapted and struck up a rapport with the kids. He was absolutely brilliant and engaged all the different communities."

McLaren has a PhD in cognitive psychology from the University of Southern Queensland, in addition to a Bachelor of Arts - Industrial Design from the University of Western Sydney, Master of Aviation Management from Griffith University, and Master of Strategic Organisational Development from the University of New England. In 2014, McLaren was also a contributing author in a global Project Management textbook. He has published multiple scientific papers in behavioral economics.
