= Richard Maxton =

Scottish rugby union player

- Born: Richard Maxton; 5 June 1979 (age 47) Scotland
- Height: 6 ft 5 in (1.96 m)
- Weight: 102 kg (16 st 1 lb)
- Notable relative(s): Lord Maxton, father James Maxton, great uncle

Rugby union career
- Position: Flanker
Amateur team(s)
Years	Team	Apps	(Points)
- Hamilton RFC
–	Stewart's Melville		
–	Glasgow Hawks		
–	Hamilton RFC		
Senior career
Years	Team	Apps	(Points)
2001–2002	Glasgow Warriors	2	(0)
International career
Years	Team	Apps	(Points)
- Scotland U19
- Scotland U21
2006	Scotland Club XV		
Coaching career
- Years: Team
- Hamilton RFC

Richard Maxton (born 5 June 1979 in Scotland) is a former Scotland Club XV international rugby union player who played for Glasgow Warriors at the Flanker position.

== Rugby union career ==
=== Amateur career ===
He started off playing rugby for Hamilton RFC but then moved to play for Stewarts Melville FP while at Edinburgh University. He was spotted by Glasgow District Rugby Union and was included in the Glasgow Thistles squad - the district's 'academy' team - that went to New Zealand for rugby training in the summer of 1998.

He was a key player in Glasgow Hawks successful side of the early 2000s. He won the Premier Division 3 times in a row with the Hawks from 2003-6. He won the Premier Division Player of the Year in 2005. In May 2018, Maxton hung up his boots as player with Hamilton - playing in the final match of the season against Whitecraigs. Hamilton won the match by 75-12, with Maxton scoring a final try for his home side.

=== Professional career ===
He was in the full Glasgow squad for the 2001-02 season.

He was also in Glasgow's Development XV squad of 2002-03 and in Glasgow's back-up squad of 2003-04.

=== International career ===
Maxton played internationally for Scotland at Under 19 and Under 21 level. He was also capped by the Scotland Club XV side.

=== Coaching career ===
Maxton became a rugby coach at Calderglen High School. He was one of Jonny Gray's first coaches.

In 2003, he was about to be called up for the Scotland 7s squad when he received a knee injury. However he later coached a Legacy 7s squad.

After his success at Hawks, Maxton moved back to his first club Hamilton as captain. In 2013, he became one of the coaches at the club. In May 2018, Maxton hung up his boots as player with Hamilton - playing in the final match of the season against Whitecraigs. Hamilton won the match by 75-12, with Maxton scoring a final try for his home side.

== Family ==
He is the son of Lord Maxton, the Labour Party politician.
