= Dave Millard =

Scottish rugby union player (born 1979)

- Born: Dave Millard; 26 November 1979 (age 46) Fiji
- Height: 1.83 m (6 ft 0 in)
- Weight: 87 kg (13 st 10 lb)
- School: Merchiston Castle School
- University: University of Aberdeen

Rugby union career
- Position: Wing
Amateur team(s)
Years	Team	Apps	(Points)
- Aberdeen GSFP
2005-06	Coventry		
- Glasgow Hawks
2009-11	Falkirk		
Senior career
Years	Team	Apps	(Points)
2003-05	Glasgow Warriors	17	(10)
International career
Years	Team	Apps	(Points)
- Scotland U18
–	Scotland U19		
–	Scotland U21		
National sevens team
Years	Team		Comps
2005	Scotland 7s		

Dave Millard (born 26 November 1979 in Fiji) is a Fijian-born former Scotland 7s international rugby union footballer. He played professionally for Glasgow Warriors. His regular playing position was on the wing.

Born in Fiji but brought up in Scotland, Millard went to Merchiston Castle School in Edinburgh. He went to Aberdeen University to study marine biology and zoology and played for Aberdeen GSFP.

The wing came through the Scotland age-grade international setup. Millard played internationally for Scotland 7s in 2005. Millard played in the IRB AXA International Sevens tournament in Wellington, New Zealand but suffered a hamstring tear on his debut.

He also played club rugby in New Zealand.

He signed for the professional provincial side Glasgow Warriors in 2003. He played there for two seasons. He was released in March 2005 and once again signed for Aberdeen GSFP

For 2005-06 season, he joined Coventry.

He returned to Scotland in 2006 to join Glasgow Hawks.

Millard joined Falkirk RFC in 2009. He retired from playing in 2011.
