= Chris Birchall (rugby) =

Scottish rugby league player (born 1981)

Personal information
- Born: Christopher Birchall; 25 March 1981 (age 45)
- Height: 1.78 m (5 ft 10 in)
- Weight: 108 kg (17 st 0 lb)

Playing information
- Position: Second-row
Club
Years	Team	Pld	T	G	FG	P
2000	Bradford Bulls	1	0	0	0	0
2002–05	Halifax	51	0	0	0	16
2006	Featherstone Rovers	10	1	0	0	4
	Total	62	1	0	0	20
Representative
Years	Team	Pld	T	G	FG	P
2004	Scotland	2	0	0	0	0

Rugby union career
- Position: Prop
Amateur team(s)
Years	Team	Apps	(Points)
2003-04	Glasgow Hutchesons Aloysians		
–	Otley		
Senior career
Years	Team	Apps	(Points)
2003-04	Glasgow Warriors	1	(0)

Chris Birchall (born 25 March 1981) is a former Scotland international rugby league player. For a period he switched codes to play rugby union; and made one appearance for Glasgow Warriors in 2003-04 season.

== Background ==
He was Scottish-Qualified as his grandmother was born in Kirkcudbright.

== Rugby League career ==
=== Professional career ===
He played once for Bradford Bulls in 2000.

Birchall played for Halifax in 2002 and 2006.

=== International career ===
He played twice for Scotland internationally. In 2004 he won the Dave Valentine Award, given by the management of the Scotland national rugby league team to their player of the year.

== Rugby Union career ==
=== Amateur career ===
While at the Warriors his contract allowed him to play for amateur club Glasgow Hutchesons Aloysians, and he made several appearances for the Giffnock club.

Birchall left Glasgow to join Otley in England.

=== Professional career ===
In 2003, Birchall switched codes to join Glasgow Warriors as a Prop on a short-term contract. He made just one appearance for the first team.
