= Alex Moffat (rugby union) =

English rugby union footballer

- Born: Alex Moffat; 29 June 1968 (age 58) Workington, England

Rugby union career
- Position: Hooker
Amateur team(s)
Years	Team	Apps	(Points)
1990-94	Flyde		
1994-95	Orrell		
2001-02	Stirling County		
2002	Orrell		
2002-03	Preston Grasshoppers		
2003-04	Stirling County		
2004	Flyde		
–	Stirling County		
Senior career
Years	Team	Apps	(Points)
1995-2001	Orrell		
2001-02	Glasgow Warriors		

Alex Moffat (born 29 June 1968 in Workington, England) is a former rugby union player who played for Glasgow Warriors and Orrell. He played in the position of hooker.

== Amateur career ==
Moffat played for Fylde Rugby Club in Lancashire from 1990-91.

He moved to Orrell in 1994, and stayed with them when they turned professional in 1995.

Moving to Scotland when Orrell returned to amateur status, Moffat played for Stirling County.

He rejoined Orrell, now an amateur club again.

He moved to Preston Grasshoppers in 2002.

In 2003 he played for Stirling County. In January 2004 he moved back to Fylde Rugby Club.

He moved back to Stirling County and was their captain. He retired from rugby in 2014.

== Professional career ==
Moffat first tried his hand with professional clubs with Orrell in 1995. Orrell became an amateur club again in 2001 and Moffat found his way north to Stirling County and Glasgow Warriors.

In 2001-02 Moffat was called into Glasgow Warriors Heineken Cup squad for that season.

He was named in a combined Glasgow-Edinburgh team to play Newcastle Falcons development team on 17 September 2001. He replaced Peter Robertson in that match and the combined team had a comfortable victory, scoring seven tries.
