= Joe Beardshaw =

English rugby union player

- Born: Joseph John Beardshaw; 30 October 1976 (age 50) Norwich, England
- Height: 1.96 m (6 ft 5 in)
- Weight: 111 kg (17 st 7 lb)

Rugby union career
- Position: Lock
Amateur team(s)
Years	Team	Apps	(Points)
- North Walsham RFC
–	Glasgow Hutchesons Aloysians		
Senior career
Years	Team	Apps	(Points)
1996-2003	Wasps RFC	81	(10)
1998-99	Bedford Blues	4	(0)
2003-05	Glasgow Warriors	39	(25)
2005-09	Cornish Pirates	75	(15)
International career
Years	Team	Apps	(Points)
- England U16
–	England U18		
–	England U21		
–	England Students		

Joe Beardshaw (born 30 October 1976) is a former England Under 21 international rugby union player. A lock, he played for Wasps and Glasgow Warriors and Cornish Pirates. Whilst at Wasps he helped them win the Anglo-Welsh Cup in 1999 in the final of which he was a replacement.

While with Glasgow Warriors, Beardshaw made a few appearances with amateur club GHA. He was released by Glasgow in an end-of-season clear-out in 2005. He stated: "Leaving Glasgow is a huge blow because I have thoroughly enjoyed my time with the squad. I felt I had been performing pretty consistently since the home Heineken Cup clash with Toulouse – but at the end of the day there was no deal for me."

He then signed for Cornish Pirates in 2005. He won the EDF trophy with the Pirates in April 2007. He was released at the end of 2008–09 season after suffering a knee injury.

He played for a Wasps Legends team in 2013.
