= Mark Tucker (rugby union) =

South AFrican rugby union player

- Born: 16 April 1980 (age 46) Johannesburg, South Africa
- Height: 6 ft 0 in (1.83 m)
- Weight: 15 st 10 lb (100 kg)

Rugby union career
- Position(s): Centre, Wing
- Current team: Worcester
Senior career
| Years | Team | Apps | (Points) |
| 1999–2005 | Northampton | 46 | (93) |
| 2005–2008 | Worcester | 39 | (15) |
- Correct as of 7 January 2008
- Correct as of 7 January 2008

Mark Tucker (born 16 April 1980) is an English rugby union player. He played Worcester Warriors in the Guinness Premiership. He plays as a centre/wing.

At Northampton he was a replacement in the victorious 2000 Heineken Cup Final as they defeated Munster. Tucker signed for Worcester from Northampton in the summer of 2005 after being with the Saints for seven seasons, where he graduated through the academy. He made his first start for the club against his former team in the Powergen Cup in October and made his league debut again against them at Sixways in January.

Born in South Africa, Mark holds a British passport after having spent over fourteen years in the UK and has represented England at U18, 19 and 21 level.

The versatile back, who is comfortable at centre or wing, signed a new one-year deal in April that will see him remain at Sixways until the summer of 2008.

He has taken up part-time rugby in London after his contract with Worcester expired. Playing for National Division Three South club Ealing Trailfinders.
