= Mark Sitch =

Australian rugby union player (born 1975)

- Born: Mark Sitch; 28 October 1975 (age 51) Australia
- Height: 1.91 m (6 ft 3 in)
- Weight: 104 kg (16 st 5 lb)

Rugby union career
- Position: Flanker
Amateur team(s)
Years	Team	Apps	(Points)
- Glasgow Hawks
Senior career
Years	Team	Apps	(Points)
2003–04	Glasgow Warriors	2	(0)

Mark Sitch (born 28 October 1975 in Australia) is an Australian-born Scottish former rugby union footballer who played for Glasgow Warriors and Glasgow Hawks. He could play at either flanker or number eight.

== Rugby Union career ==
=== Amateur career ===
Sitch played for Glasgow Hawks.

He was part of cup-winning side that won the BT Cup in May 2004.

He won the Premiership Player of the Year trophy for that season 2003-04.

In 2016, Sitch turned out for a Hawks Legends side.

=== Professional career ===
Sitch played two competitive matches for Glasgow Warriors in the season 2003-04.

=== Coaching career ===
Sitch went on to coach Allan Glens.
