= Jonny Vaughton =

Welsh rugby union player

- Born: 21 January 1982 (age 44) Wales
- Height: 5 ft 10 in (1.78 m)
- Weight: 13 st 1 lb (83 kg)

Rugby union career
Senior career
Years	Team	Apps	(Points)
?–2005	Swansea		
2005–2010	Ospreys	63	
National sevens team
Years	Team		Comps
2006	Wales		

Jonny Vaughton is a Welsh rugby union player. His usual position was wing. He started his career at Swansea before moving on to the Ospreys, making his debut against Munster in September 2005 and going on to make 63 appearances. He was released by the Ospreys at the end of the 2009–10 season.

He competed internationally for Wales sevens at the 2006 Commonwealth Games.
