= Simon Gunn (rugby union) =

New Zealand rugby union player (born 1977)

- Born: Simon Gunn; 27 February 1977 (age 49)
- Height: 1.83 m (6 ft 0 in)
- Weight: 102 kg (16 st 1 lb)

Rugby union career
- Position: Hooker
Amateur team(s)
| Years | Team | Apps | (Points) |
| 2003–04 | Kirkcaldy RFC | 6 | (0) |
Senior career
| Years | Team | Apps | (Points) |
| 2002–03 | Border Reivers | | |
| 2003–04 | Glasgow Warriors | 12 | (0) |

Simon Gunn (born 27 February 1977) is a former rugby union player who played for Glasgow Warriors and the Border Reivers in the Pro12. He played in the position of hooker.

Simon Gunn played at amateur level for Kirkcaldy RFC.

He signed for Glasgow Warriors from Border Reivers in 2003. He played 12 times for Glasgow: 8 starts and 2 sub appearances in the Pro12; and twice in the 2003-04 Celtic Cup.

He was released by Glasgow Warriors in 2004.
