= Nathan Bonner-Evans =

- Born: Nathan Bonner-Evans; 27 October 1978 (age 48) Swansea, Wales
- Height: 6 ft 4 in (1.93 m)
- Weight: 17 st 5 lb (113 kg)
- Notable relative: Thea Bonner-Evans (Daughter)

Rugby union career
- Position: Number Eight.
- Current team: London Welsh RFC
Senior career
| Years | Team | Apps | (Points) |
| 2003–2005 | Ospreys | | |
| 2005–2008 | Sale Sharks | 37 | (0) |
| 2008– | London Welsh RFC | 7 | (10) |
International career
| Years | Team | Apps | (Points) |
- Wales A

Nathan Bonner-Evans is a Wales A international rugby union player. A number 8 forward, he has played for Ospreys and for Sale Sharks. In December 2008 he signed for London Welsh RFC. In the 2005–2006 season, Bonner-Evans made 11 appearances as Sale Sharks won their first ever Premiership title.
