= James McLaren (rugby) =

Scotland dual-code rugby international footballer

- Born: James Gerard McLaren; 28 July 1972 (age 54) Stirling, Scotland
- Height: 1.91 m (6 ft 3 in)
- Weight: 110 kg (17 st 5 lb; 243 lb)
- School: St Stanislaus College, Bathurst
- University: Hawkesbury Agricultural College
- Notable relative(s): Tom McLaren, brother

Rugby union career
- Position: Centre
Amateur team(s)
Years	Team	Apps	(Points)
- Stirling County
Senior career
Years	Team	Apps	(Points)
1996–98	Glasgow Warriors	0	(0)
1998	Caledonia Reds	1	(0)
1998–00	Bourgoin		
2000–02	Glasgow Warriors	38	(72)
2002–04	Begles-Bordeaux		
2004–06	Bayonne		
- Correct as of 18 December 2012
International career
Years	Team	Apps	(Points)
1999–03	Scotland	30	(30)
- Correct as of 18 December 2012
- Rugby league career

Playing information
- Position: Fullback, Centre
Club
Years	Team	Pld	T	G	FG	P
	Canberra Raiders
1997	Wakefield Trinity	19	8	7	0	48
	Total	19	8	7	0	48
Representative
Years	Team	Pld	T	G	FG	P
1997	Scotland	1

James "Jim / Fritz / Jock" Gerard McLaren (born 28 June 1972) is a Scottish dual-code international rugby league and rugby union footballer. He played representative level rugby league (RL) for the Scotland national rugby league team, and at club level for Wakefield Trinity Wildcats, and representative level rugby union (RU) for the Scotland national rugby union team, as a centre, and for Glasgow Warriors and Caledonia Reds.

He was the first player to be capped by Scotland in a Rugby League international before representing in a Rugby Union international.

== Background ==
McLaren was born in Stirling, Scotland.

== Club career ==
=== Rugby League ===
McLaren played rugby league in Australia for the Canberra Raiders, before returning to his hometown of Stirling to play rugby union for Stirling County. While with Stirling he was called up to the provincial rugby union sides Glasgow Warriors and Caledonia Reds.

Whilst playing for Stirling against Melrose, McLaren was given a 26-week ban by the Scottish Rugby Union for being found to have kicked Craig Chalmers in the head, in a ruck. Stirling County had claimed that slow-motion video evidence proved that while Chalmers had, indeed, been kicked, the act had not been deliberate. The SRU stated that it was their intent for a 26-week ban for kicking to the head to be mandatory. At the rugby union ban, McLaren once again took up rugby league.

At the time rugby league had switched to a summer sport in Britain. McLaren signed for Wakefield Trinity Wildcats in 1997. Serving out his rugby union ban in rugby league, he returned to Glasgow Warriors for the start of the 1997–98 season.

=== Rugby Union ===
He was named as a replacement in Glasgow's European Conference match at home to Agen on 30 October 1996. He also played in Glasgow's pre-season match against London Scottish coming off the bench to replace Alan Bulloch on 10 August 1997.

However he also played for Caledonia Reds late in season 1997–98.

When Caledonia Reds folded at the end of season 1997–98, McLaren was earmarked to return to Glasgow Warriors. However instead he went to France playing for Bourgoin.

Two years later, in 2000, McLaren did sign back with Glasgow Warriors.

He stayed in Glasgow another two years before returning to France, to play for Begles-Bordeaux, and then Bayonne.

== International honours ==
=== Rugby League ===
McLaren won a cap for Scotland in rugby league while at the Wakefield Trinity Wildcats in the 20–22 defeat by France in Glasgow on 9 July 1997.

=== Rugby Union ===
His international rugby union début for the Scotland national rugby union team came against Argentina in 1999. He made 30 Test appearances between 1999 and 2003 and finished his representative career playing in all four of Scotland's pool games in the 2003 Rugby Union World Cup.

== Personal ==
Born in Stirling, he emigrated to Australia in 1979.

McLaren was educated in Bathurst, New South Wales, Australia, and attended St Stanislaus College. He completed tertiary qualifications in microbiology, from Hawkesbury Agricultural College in Sydney, prior to commencing his professional rugby career.

He used the name 'Jim' in rugby league; and 'James' when in rugby union.
