= Graeme Kiddie =

Scottish rugby union player

- Born: Graeme Kiddie; 13 December 1970 (age 55) Dundee, Scotland
- Height: 5 ft 9 in (1.75 m)
- Weight: 130 kg (20 st 7 lb; 290 lb)
- Occupation: Rugby player

Rugby union career
- Position: Full Back
Amateur team(s)
Years	Team	Apps	(Points)
- Dundee HSFP
–	Edinburgh Academicals		
–	Boroughmuir		
–	Plymouth Albion		
–	Boroughmuir		
–	Morgan Academy RFC		
Senior career
Years	Team	Apps	(Points)
1997-98	Caledonia Reds		
2000-2002	Glasgow Warriors	7	(20)
Provincial / State sides
Years	Team	Apps	(Points)
- Scottish Exiles
International career
Years	Team	Apps	(Points)
- Scotland Under 21
National sevens team
Years	Team		Comps
- Scotland 7s

Graeme Kiddie (born 13 December 1970, Dundee, Scotland) is a former Scotland Under 21 international rugby union player who played at Full Back or Centre.

Kiddie started his rugby career with Dundee HSFP.

He played for Edinburgh Academicals before representing the provincial Caledonia Reds side in 1997.

He played for professional side Caledonia Reds until they folded in 1998.

He played for Glasgow Warriors. He joined Glasgow for season 2000–01, but never played that season due to injury.

Kiddie played for Boroughmuir in 1999 to 2003–04, with a break when he played for Plymouth. He also played Sevens for Boroughmuir and the Royal Scots Fijians. He played in the Melrose Sevens tournament for NIG Scottish Thistles in 2002 and was in Scotland's Sevens rugby squad for the Manchester Commonwealth Games for 2002.

Kiddie was a Scotland Under 21 internationalist. He also made the Scotland Sevens international team, playing 12 matches and scoring 34 points.

He played for Plymouth Albion. He signed for Plymouth in the 2002–03 season. While with Plymouth he played for the Scottish Exiles District team.

Finally, he played rugby for Morgan Academy from 2007 to 2014. After rugby he became a Physical Education teacher at Morgan Academy, Dundee.
