= Cameron Blades =

Australian rugby union player

- Born: Cameron David Blades; 16 April 1971 (age 55) Sydney, Australia
- Height: 5 ft 11 in (1.80 m)
- Weight: 110 kg (17 st 5 lb)
- School: Killara High School
- Notable relative: Andrew Blades

Rugby union career
- Position: Loosehead Prop
Amateur team(s)
Years	Team	Apps	(Points)
- Gordon RFC
–	Randwick DRUFC		
Senior career
Years	Team	Apps	(Points)
- NSW Waratahs
2001–03	Glasgow Warriors	29	(5)
International career
Years	Team	Apps	(Points)
- Australia U21
- Australia A
1997	Australia	1	(0)
Coaching career
- Years: Team
- 2012–13: Southern Districts

Cameron Blades (born 16 April 1971) is an Australian international former rugby union player who played at the loosehead prop position, but could also cover at tighthead prop and hooker. He played professionally for New South Wales Waratahs and Glasgow Warriors.

== Career ==
Blades was born in Sydney. He had one full international cap for Australia against England in Sydney on 12 July 1997. Australia won the match 25–6. He also played for the Australian Under 21s. His brother Andrew Blades also played for Australia and was a member of the 1999 Rugby World Cup winning team.

He was signed for Glasgow Warriors in 2001 by coach Richie Dixon and entered the UK because of his Irish passport, leaving the New South Wales Waratahs. This meant he could play in the Heineken Cup as a non-foreigner. While not playing for Warriors, he played for Glasgow Hawks.

== Coaching ==
Blades turned to rugby coaching after his playing career, and was head coach at Southern Districts for two seasons where his team finished as runner-up in the Shute Shield grand final of 2012. He was appointed as forwards coach of the Australia U20 team in 2014, before joining the New South Wales Waratahs as the set-piece coach for the Super Rugby season of 2016.
