= Kenny Sinclair =

Scottish rugby union player

- Born: Kenny Sinclair; 28 July 1975 (age 51) Irvine, Scotland
- Height: 5 ft 10 in (1.78 m)
- Weight: 82 kg (12 st 13 lb)
- School: Marr College

Rugby union career
- Position: Scrum-half
Amateur team(s)
Years	Team	Apps	(Points)
- Marr RFC
- Kilmarnock RFC
1999-2007	Glasgow Hawks		
Senior career
Years	Team	Apps	(Points)
2000-04	Glasgow Warriors	12	(10)
Provincial / State sides
Years	Team	Apps	(Points)
- Glasgow District
International career
Years	Team	Apps	(Points)
2002	Scotland A		
National sevens team
Years	Team		Comps
2002	Scotland 7s		

Kenny Sinclair (born 28 July 1975 in Irvine, Scotland) is a former Scottish international Sevens rugby union player who played for Glasgow Warriors at the Scrum-half position.

Taking up rugby union at Marr College, Sinclair then progressed to play for Marr RFC before moving to play for Kilmarnock RFC in 1995. In 1999, he joined Glasgow Hawks and played there for 3 seasons.

He played for Glasgow District.

He was called up to Glasgow Warriors late in season 2000-01, coming on for Barry Irving in the 48th minute against Swansea RFC in Glasgow's final Welsh-Scottish League match of the season. He was still a Hawks player. After playing for the Warriors, Sinclair went back to playing for the Hawks.

He was capped for Scotland A in 2002 against Ireland Wolfhounds. He was also capped for the Scotland 7s side the same year, at Manchester's Commonwealth Games.

He was named in the 2005 Scotland Sevens squad to compete in the IRB tournaments in Wellington and Los Angeles .

Sinclair is an electrician to trade and currently works in Edinburgh.
