= Gary Powell (rugby union) =

Welsh rugby union footballer

- Born: Gary Powell; 30 October 1979 (age 47) Church Village, Rhondda Cynon Taf, Wales
- Height: 6 ft 0 in (1.83 m)
- Weight: 18 st 7 lb (118 kg)
- School: Treorchy Comprehensive School
- University: Llandovery College

Rugby union career
- Position: Prop
- Current team: Cardiff Blues
Senior career
Years	Team	Apps	(Points)
- Cardiff RFC
- Richmond F.C.
- Leeds Tykes
- Gloucester
2006–present	Cardiff Blues	26	(0)
- Correct as of 28 September 2007

Gary Powell (born 30 October 1979) is a former rugby union player, with the Cardiff Blues.

== Rugby ==
Powell joined Cardiff RFC in the summer of 1999 and had a successful season which included a call up to the Welsh Under 21 squad. Powell then moved to Richmond F.C., Leeds Tykes and Gloucester before returning to the Arms Park with Cardiff Blues in 2006.

In 2010, Powell had to retire due to a long-standing Achilles injury.
