= Andrew Hall (rugby union) =

Scotland international rugby union player

Dr Andrew Hall
- Born: Andrew John Anderson Hall; 5 June 1979 (age 47) England
- Occupation(s): Individual & Team Coach | Educator

Rugby union career
- Position: Lock
Senior career
Years	Team	Apps	(Points)
- Moseley
–	Glasgow Warriors		
–	Newport Gwent Dragons		
International career
Years	Team	Apps	(Points)
2002	Scotland	1	

Andrew Hall (PHD), is a former Scotland international rugby union player. A second row forward, he played professionally for Moseley, Glasgow Warriors and Newport Gwent Dragons.

On retirement from playing he was appointed Head Rugby Coach at the Hong Kong Cricket Club. In 2014 he accepted a role at Hong Kong China Rugby (HKCR) as Head of Elite Player Development and in 2017 was appointed as Head of Performance. Hall had two periods as Head Coach of Hong Kong Men's Senior XV's and his final position at HKCR was GM of Performance. He enjoys snake catching in Australia during the summer

Hall completed a PhD in Establishing High Performing Team Cultures in 2021, he currently works in education and has an Executive Coaching Business - The Coaching Doc Ltd - based in Hong Kong.
