= Michael Bartlett (rugby union) =

- Born: Michael Bartlett; 25 December 1978 (age 47) Christchurch, New Zealand
- Height: 6 ft 1 in (1.85 m)
- Weight: 92 kg (14 st 7 lb)

Rugby union career
- Position: Wing
Senior career
Years	Team	Apps	(Points)
1999-2003	Glasgow Warriors	9	(10)

Michael Bartlett (born 25 December 1978 in Christchurch, New Zealand) is a former rugby union player who played for Glasgow Warriors on the wing.

Bartlett was Scottish-qualified as his maternal grandmother was born in Scotland. He signed for Glasgow Warriors in 2000, one week after arriving in Glasgow.

He previously played for Canterbury and was in their training academy.

He was named in a New Zealand 'back up squad' in 2000 outside the 30 man strong All Black World Cup Squad.

He was included in the 2002 Scotland squad that played Barbarians on 1 June.
