= Paul Dearlove =

- Born: Paul Dearlove; 6 February 1979 (age 47) France
- Height: 1.92 m (6 ft 4 in)
- Weight: 109 kg (17 st 2 lb)

Rugby union career
- Position: Flanker
Amateur team(s)
| Years | Team | Apps | (Points) |
- Sydney University RFC
| – | Glasgow Hawks | | |
Senior career
| Years | Team | Apps | (Points) |
| 2003-06 | Glasgow Warriors | 43 | (15) |
| 2006– | Pau | | |
Super Rugby
| Years | Team | Apps | (Points) |
- Brumbies
International career
| Years | Team | Apps | (Points) |
- Australia U21

Paul Dearlove (born 6 February 1979 in France) is a French-born Scottish former rugby union footballer who played for Glasgow Warriors and Pau. He could play at either flanker or number eight.

Dearlove had eligibility for France (by birth), South Africa (through his father), Australia (through his mother) and Scotland (through grandparent). He represented Australia to Under 21 level but declined the offer of a Sevens cap (that would tie him to Australia). Instead he was called up to the Scotland squad but was not capped in a formal test. Instead he represented Scotland on tour against NSW County in 2004, scoring a try in a 48–10 win. He was called into the Scotland squad again in 2005 to face Italy, but again was not used.

In 2003 he moved from Brumbies and Sydney University RFC to play for Glasgow Warriors. He suffered a broken leg in 2004.

When not involved with the Warriors, Dearlove played for the amateur side Glasgow Hawks.

In 2006 he moved from Glasgow Warriors to Pau. He was to captain the side.

In February 2009, he spoke out to journalist Paul Kimmage investigating doping in rugby, stating that he was aware of it:

"A couple of years ago I was told by a fitness trainer that an eight-week cycle of steroids could change my career. In his experience, a player that did just one cycle would maintain 60 per cent of the gains he achieved. To put this in perspective:

If I gained 5kg of muscle mass - even when I went off the drugs - I would keep three of those kilos. If I increased my explosiveness which allowed me to reduce my 100 metres time by one second, even if I never did another cycle of steroids, I would remain 0.6 of a second faster.

These numbers may not seem enormous but to gain that type of edge could mean the difference between being a good player and a star, a provincial representative or an international. And we know what else would change. The base salary, the access to endorsements, image rights. The difference could mean the difference between a journeyman or a rugby millionaire."
