= Barry Irving =

Scottish rugby union player

- Born: Barry Alan Irving; 31 December 1979 (age 46) Sevenoaks, England
- Height: 180 cm (5 ft 11 in)
- Weight: 86 kg (13 st 8 lb)

Rugby union career
- Position: Fly-half
Senior career
Years	Team	Apps	(Points)
1998-99	London Scottish	2	(5)
1999-2003	Glasgow Warriors	31	(68)
2003-04	Tarbes		
2004-07	Amatori Catania	25	(204)
2007-10	Parma	64	(553)
International career
Years	Team	Apps	(Points)
1997-98	Scotland U18		
1999-2001	Scotland U21	9	(0)
2001	Scotland A	1	

Barry Irving (born 31 December 1979 in Sevenoaks, England) is an English born former Scotland 'A' international rugby union player. He plays at Fly-half.

Irving qualifies for Scotland as his father was born near Canonbie in Dumfriesshire. He was capped by Scotland A against New Zealand in 2001, confirming his Scottish nationality. He was called up for the full Senior squad in 2000 by Ian McGeechan but not used.

He started playing rugby for his local club Sevenoaks but in season 1998-99 he joined London Scottish. He made a try scoring debut for London Scottish against Saracens, four days before his nineteenth birthday.

He joined Glasgow at the start of the 1999-2000 season. Unfortunately he became blighted with injury and had very few run outs with the Glasgow side. He left Glasgow Warriors at the end of the 2002-03 season to sign for French side Tarbes who play in the French Pro D2 league. He played 22 matches for the French club but left them after one season.

He then signed for Italian club Amatori Catania. In season 2005-06 he was nominated for Player of the Year in Italy.

He later played for Rugby Parma from 2007-08 season to 2010.
