= Craig Warlow =

Welsh rugby union footballer and coach

Craig Warlow (born 19 March 1975) is a Welsh rugby union player. An outside half, he made 69 appearances for the Welsh regional team Newport Gwent Dragons. He previously played for Kenfig Hill RFC, Llanelli RFC, and Bridgend RFC.

He is currently head coach of Bridgend College
