= Graeme Beveridge =

Scotland international rugby union player

- Born: 17 February 1976 (age 50) Edinburgh, Scotland
- Height: 5 ft 5 in (1.67 m)
- Weight: 12 st 8 lb (80 kg)

Rugby union career
- Position: Scrum-half
Amateur team(s)
Years	Team	Apps	(Points)
- Boroughmuir
Senior career
Years	Team	Apps	(Points)
1996-98	Edinburgh Rugby	2	(0)
1998-2007	Glasgow Warriors	146	(75)
2007-09	Bristol Rugby	23	(0)
International career
Years	Team	Apps	(Points)
2000-2006	Scotland	6	(0)
- Correct as of 2 September 2007

Graeme Beveridge (born 17 February 1976) is a rugby union manager who is a former rugby union footballer. He previously played at scrum-half for Edinburgh Rugby, Glasgow Warriors, Bristol and Scotland.

== Playing career ==
Beveridge began his professional career with a brief stint at Edinburgh Rugby before moving to Glasgow in 1998. A leg injury kept him from playing in 1998–99, though he did manage one competitive game in 1998-99's WRU Challenge Cup against Newport RFC.

He made his international debut against New Zealand in Auckland on 1 July 2000. With over 100 caps for the Glasgow Warriors he was part of the Scotland squad in the 2003 World Cup in Australia.

He used to be a big contender for the Scotland scrum-half berth but then found himself quite far down the list with Chris Cusiter, Mike Blair, Sam Pinder and Rory Lawson above him.

In March 2009, Beveridge left Bristol Rugby by mutual consent, finding work outside rugby as a Private Wealth Consultant in Bristol. He then became a player-manager at amateur side Old Redcliffians.

== Manager ==
He re-joined Glasgow Warriors as Rugby Operations manager in April 2014.

Scottish Rugby re-developed their youth academy structure for 2015, bringing in 4 new academies which corresponded to the traditional 4 Scottish districts. Beveridge was named as the new Academy manager for Edinburgh in December 2014.
