= Nathan Ross (rugby union) =

Australian rugby union player

- Born: Nathan Donald Ross; 14 December 1976 (age 49) Australia
- Height: 206 cm (6 ft 9 in)
- Weight: 123 kg (19 st 5 lb)
- School: macgregor state high school

Rugby union career
- Position: Lock
Senior career
Years	Team	Apps	(Points)
2001-05	Glasgow Warriors	64	(20)
2005	Exeter Chiefs		
Super Rugby
Years	Team	Apps	(Points)
1997–2001	Queensland Reds		
International career
Years	Team	Apps	(Points)
2001-2004	Scotland A	13	(10)

Nathan Ross (born 14 December 1976 in Australia) is an Australian born former Scotland 'A' international rugby union player. He played at Lock.

Ross qualifies for Scotland as his grandfather was born in Dunfermline. He was capped by Scotland A against Romania in 2001, confirming his Scottish nationality. He was called up for the full Senior squad in 2001 for a training session by Ian McGeechan but not used in a full match.

Ross played Australian schoolboys in 1994–95. 110 games for brothers rugby club, Brisbane

Ross signed for Glasgow Warriors in 2001. He gave up a banking job in Brisbane to sign for the Warriors.

He signed for Exeter Chiefs in 2005 And went on to play 8 games.
