= 2002–03 Glasgow Warriors season =

- Ground: Hughenden (Capacity: 6,000)
- Coach(es): (New Zealand) Kiwi Searancke to April 2003 (Scotland) Hugh Campbell from April 2003
- Captain: (Scotland) Andy Nicol
- Most caps: (Scotland) Gordon Bulloch (22)
- Top scorer: (Cook Islands) Tommy Hayes (137)
- Most tries: (Scotland) Glenn Metcalfe (6)
- League: 2002–03 Celtic League
- 2nd in Pool B & Quarter-finalists Celtic League; 3rd in Scottish Inter-District Championship
1st kit	2nd kit

The 2002–03 season is the seventh in the history of the Glasgow Warriors as a professional side. During this season the young professional side competed as Glasgow Rugby.

The 2002–03 season saw Glasgow Rugby compete in the competitions: the Celtic League and the European Champions Cup, the Heineken Cup and a reformed Scottish Inter-District Championship, for sponsorship reasons known as the Bank of Scotland Pro Cup.

== Team ==
=== Coaches ===
- Head coach: (New Zealand) Kiwi Searancke to April 2003; (Scotland) Hugh Campbell from April 2003
- Assistant coach: (New Zealand) Gordon Macpherson to April 2003; (Scotland) Shade Munro from April 2003
- Assistant coach: (Australia) Steve Anderson to April 2003; (Scotland) Sean Lineen from April 2003

=== Squad ===
Hookers (Scotland) Gordon Bulloch (Australia) Ben Daly (Scotland) Scott Lawson (Scotland) Gavin Scott (Scotland) Fergus Thomson Props (Australia) Cameron Blades (Scotland) Lee Harrison (Scotland) Dave Hilton (Scotland) Andrew Kelly (Scotland) Gordon Sykes (Scotland) Alan Brown Locks (Scotland) Andrew Hall (Samoa) Opeta Palepoi (Scotland) Nathan Ross (Scotland) Jason White	Loose forwards (Scotland) Donnie Macfadyen (Scotland) Rory McKay (Scotland) Jon Petrie (Scotland) Roland Reid (Scotland) Gordon Simpson (Scotland) Andrew Wilson Scrum halves (Scotland) Graeme Beveridge (Scotland) Chris Black (Scotland) Andy Nicol (Scotland) Kenny Sinclair Fly halves (Cook Islands) Tommy Hayes (Scotland) Calvin Howarth (Scotland) Barry Irving	Centres (Scotland) Alan Bulloch (Scotland) Andrew Henderson (Scotland) Ian McInroy (New Zealand) Joe Naufahu Back Three (New Zealand) Michael Bartlett (Scotland) Rory Kerr (Scotland) Glenn Metcalfe (Scotland) Stuart Moffat (Australia) Rod Seib (Scotland) Jon Steel

=== Academy players ===
There are no Academy players for Glasgow Warriors in the 2002–03 season however these players were used in Glasgow's Development XV team.

Gordon Macfadyen (Glasgow Hawks)
Justin Reid (Glasgow Hutchesons Aloysians)
Paul Burke (Ayr)
Stephen MacKinnon (Glasgow Hutchesons Aloysians)
Gavin Mories (Glasgow Hawks)
Stuart Male (Glasgow Hawks)
Colin Shaw (Glasgow Hawks)
Graham Thomson (West of Scotland)
Sam Parlane (Stirling County)
Euan Murray (Glasgow Hawks)
Neil Meikle (Ayr)
Damien Kelly (Ayr)
Scott McKechnie (Grangemouth Stags)
Colin Eadie (Stirling County)
Eddie Manawaiti (Ayr)
Richard Maxton (Glasgow Hawks)
Alastair Davidson (Borders)
Stephen MacKinnon (Glasgow Hutchesons Aloysians)

== Player statistics ==
During the 2002–03 season, Glasgow have used 32 different players in competitive games. The table below shows the number of appearances and points scored by each player.

Pos.	Nation	Name	Scottish Inter-District Championship			Celtic League			Heineken Cup			Total	
Pos.	Nation	Name	Apps (sub)	Tries	Points kicked	Apps (sub)	Tries	Points kicked	Apps (sub)	Tries	Points kicked	Apps (sub)	Total pts
HK	(Scotland)	Gordon Bulloch	7(1)	0	0	7(1)	0	0	6	0	0	20(2)	0
HK	(Australia)	Ben Daly	1(1)	0	0	1(3)	0	0	(1)	0	0	2(5)	0
HK	(Scotland)	Scott Lawson	(2)	0	0	0	0	0	0	0	0	(2)	0
PR	(Australia)	Cameron Blades	3(3)	0	0	3(1)	0	0	3(1)	0	0	9(5)	0
PR	(Scotland)	Lee Harrison	5	0	0	6(1)	0	0	5	0	0	16(1)	0
PR	(Scotland)	Dave Hilton	4(4)	0	0	6(2)	0	0	4(1)	0	0	14(7)	0
PR	(Scotland)	Andrew Kelly	3(1)	0	0	(1)	0	0	(4)	0	0	3(6)	0
LK	(Scotland)	Andrew Hall	5(1)	0	0	7(1)	0	0	5(1)	0	0	17(3)	0
LK	(Samoa)	Opeta Palepoi	1	0	0	0	0	0	0	0	0	1	0
LK	(Scotland)	Nathan Ross	4	1	0	4(2)	0	0	3(3)	1	0	11(5)	10
LK	(Scotland)	Jason White	5	0	0	5(1)	0	0	4	2	0	14(1)	10
BR	(Scotland)	Donnie Macfadyen	4(1)	0	0	7	2	0	4(2)	1	0	15(3)	15
BR	(Scotland)	Rory McKay	2(3)	0	0	1	1	0	(2)	0	0	3(5)	5
BR	(Scotland)	Jon Petrie	7	1	0	8	0	0	5(1)	1	0	20(1)	10
BR	(Scotland)	Roland Reid	3(3)	1	0	0	0	0	(1)	0	0	4(3)	5
BR	(Scotland)	Gordon Simpson	3(2)	0	0	7	3	0	3(1)	1	0	13(3)	20
BR	(Scotland)	Andrew Wilson	6(1)	1	0	2(5)	1	0	6	0	0	14(6)	10
SH	(Scotland)	Chris Black	(2)	0	0	0	0	0	(1)	0	0	(3)	0
SH	(Scotland)	Graeme Beveridge	5(1)	1	0	4(4)	1	0	6	0	0	15(5)	10
SH	(Scotland)	Andy Nicol	2(4)	0	0	4(3)	0	0	(2)	0	0	6(9)	0
FH	(Cook Islands)	Tommy Hayes	1(1)	0	0	7	2	95	5	0	32	13(1)	137
FH	(Scotland)	Calvin Howarth	6(1)	1	56	8	1	23	5	1	9	19(1)	113
FH	(Scotland)	Barry Irving	1(4)	0	13	0	0	0	0	0	0	1(4)	13
CE	(Scotland)	Alan Bulloch	4	0	0	7(1)	4	0	4(2)	0	0	15(3)	20
CE	(Scotland)	Andrew Henderson	5(1)	1	0	3(4)	0	0	4	2	0	12(5)	15
CE	(Scotland)	Ian McInroy	2	0	0	0	0	0	0	0	0	2	0
CE	(New Zealand)	Joe Naufahu	6	2	0	0	0	0	0	0	0	6	10
WG	(New Zealand)	Michael Bartlett	2	0	0	2(1)	2	0	2(1)	0	0	6(2)	10
WG	(Scotland)	Glenn Metcalfe	7(1)	4	0	6	1	0	5	1	0	18(1)	30
WG	(Scotland)	Jon Steel	5	0	0	7	2	0	5	1	0	17	15
FB	(Scotland)	Rory Kerr	3(2)	2	0	(1)	0	0	0	0	0	3(3)	10
FB	(Scotland)	Stuart Moffat	5(1)	0	0	8	4	0	6	0	0	19(1)	20

== Staff movements ==
=== Coaches ===
==== Personnel in ====
- (New Zealand) Kiwi Searancke from (New Zealand) Waikato Rugby Union
- (Australia) Steve Anderson from (England) Warrington Wolves Rugby League F.C.
- Hugh Campbell from Scotland A
- (Scotland) Sean Lineen from (Scotland) Boroughmuir RFC
- (Scotland) Shade Munro from (Scotland) Glasgow Hawks

==== Personnel out ====
- (Scotland) Richie Dixon to (Scotland) Scottish Rugby Union Head of Coach Development
- (Scotland) Rob Moffat to (Scotland) Border Reivers
- (New Zealand) Kiwi Searancke released
- (Australia) Steve Anderson to (Scotland) Scottish Rugby Union High Performance Manager
- (New Zealand) Gordon Macpherson to West of Scotland

== Player movements ==
=== Player transfers ===
==== In ====
- (Australia) Ben Daly from (Australia) New South Wales Waratahs
- (Scotland) Rory McKay from (Scotland) Glasgow Hawks
- (Scotland) Stuart Moffat from (England) Cambridge University
- (Scotland) Calvin Howarth from (Scotland) Edinburgh.
- (Scotland) Alan Brown from (Scotland) Dundee HSFP

==== Out ====
- (Scotland) Gordon McIlwham to (France) Bordeaux-Begles
- (Scotland) James McLaren to (France) Bordeaux-Begles
- (Scotland) Euan Murray released
- (Scotland) Martin Waite released
- (Scotland) Colin Stewart to (Scotland) Border Reivers
- (Scotland) Jonathan Stuart to (Scotland) Border Reivers
- (Scotland) Chris Cusiter to (Scotland) Watsonians

== Competitions ==
=== Pre-season and friendlies ===
==== Match 1 ====
9 August 2002
19:30

Glasgow (Scotland)	7-26	(England) Harlequins
Try: Jason White; Con: Tommy Hayes	Preview; Report; Report	Try: Williams; Powell; Tiatia; Moore; Con: Burke (2); Slemen

Hughenden, Glasgow
Referee: J Hogg (Hawick)

Glasgow: S Moffat; J Steel, A Bulloch, A Henderson, I McInroy; C Howarth, A Nicol capt; C Blades, B Daly, L Harrison, N Ross, A Hall, R McKay, D Macfadyen, J Petrie. Subs used G Bulloch, A Kelly, J White, G Simpson, G Beveridge, T Hayes, R Seib, G Sykes, G Scott, A Wilson

Harlequins: N Williams; R Jewell, U Monye, C Bell, W Greenwood, M Moore; P Burke, M Powell; B Starr, K Wood, L Gomez, K Rudzki, S Miall, D Griffin, L Sherriff, T Diprose. Subs used R Jewell, D Slemen, S Bemand, J Leonard, A Tiatia, B Davison, J Evans, K Horstmann

==== Match 2 ====
16 August 2002
19:30

Glasgow (Scotland)	32-11	(England) Exeter Chiefs
Try: Gordon Bulloch; Rory Kerr; Donnie Macfadyen; Stuart Moffat; Andrew Wilson; Con: Tommy Hayes; Calvin Howarth; Pen: Tommy Hayes	Preview; Report; Report	Try: Ed Lewsey; Pen: Tony Yapp (2)

Hughenden, Glasgow
Referee: G Davies (Fettesian/Lorretonians)

Glasgow: Stuart Moffat; Jon Steel, Ian McInroy, Andrew Henderson, Rory Kerr; Tommy Hayes, Graeme Beveridge; David Hilton, Gordon Bulloch, Lee Harrison, Steve Griffiths, Jason White (captain), Jon Petrie, Donnie Macfadyen, Gordon Simpson. Substitutes - Gavin Scott for Gordon Bulloch (21 minutes to 37), Rory McKay for Petrie (21–28), Scott for Gordon Bulloch (half-time-60), Cameron Blades for Hilton (half-time), Andrew Wilson for Macfadyen (half-time), Andrew Hall for Griffiths (half-time), Andrew Kelly for Harrison (51), Calvin Howarth for Henderson (51), Andy Nicol for Beveridge (60), Alan Bulloch for McInroy (60), Nathan Ross for White (69), McKay for Petrie (69), Ben Daly for Gordon Bulloch (71), Kenny Sinclair for Nicol (78).

Exeter Chiefs: D Kelly; C Wall, G Bunny, B Thompson, E Lewsey; T Yapp, R John; A Ozdemir, K Brooking, P Sluman, D Sims, Rob Baxter (capt), G Willis, S Etheridge, Richard Baxter. Subs: N Clarke, D Porte, I Brown, B Cole, J Gaunt, A Murdoch, S Howard.

==== Match 3 ====
23 August 2002
19:30

Ulster (Ireland)	19-19	(Scotland) Glasgow
Try: Sexton; Young (2); Con: Larkin (2)	Preview; Preview; Report	Try: Tommy Hayes; Con: Tommy Hayes; Pen: Tommy Hayes (4)

Kingspan Stadium
Referee: Alain Rolland (Leinster)

Ulster: B Cunningham; S Stewart; R Constable, J Bell; S Coulter; A Larkin, N Doak; J Fitzpatrick, M Sexton, C Boyd, T McWhirter, J Davidson, A Ward, capt, W Brosnihan, R Nelson. Replacements: R Kempson for Boyd (48), P Shields for Sexton (40), M Blair for McWhirter (40), R Brink for Brosnihan (40), S Mallon for Coulter (72), S Young for Stewart (25), Brosnihan for Nelson (61), K Campbell for Bell (79).

Glasgow: S Moffat; J Steel; A Bulloch, A Henderson, R Kerr; T Hayes, G Beveridge; C Blades, G Bulloch, L Harrison, A Hall, J White, capt, A Wilson, D Macfadyen, J Petrie. Replacements: D Hilton for Harrison (30), B Daly for Bulloch (70), C Howarth for Moffat (62), A Nicol for Beveridge (40), M Barlett for Kerr (40), G Simpson for Wilson (40), N Ross for Hall (30).

==== Match 4 ====
21 October 2002

Glasgow (Scotland)	33 - 18	(Scotland) Scottish Exiles
Try: Graham Thomson (2); Rory Kerr; Chris Black; Rory McKay; Con: Barry Irving (4)	Preview; Report; Report	Try: Graeme Kiddie; Lance Hamilton; Con: Greg McDonald; Pen: Greg McDonald (2)

Hughenden, Glasgow
Referee: Martin Valentine (Stewartry)

Glasgow: Colin Shaw (Glasgow Hawks); Graham Thomson (West of Scotland), Ian McInroy (Glasgow Rugby), Sam Parlane (Stirling County), Rory Kerr (Glasgow Rugby); Barry Irving (Glasgow Rugby), Chris Black (Glasgow Rugby) captain; Euan Murray (Glasgow Hawks), Neil Meikle (Ayr), Andrew Kelly (Glasgow Rugby), Damien Kelly (Ayr), Scott McKechnie (Grangemouth), Rory McKay (Glasgow Rugby), Colin Eadie (Stirling County), Eddie Manawaiti (Ayr).
Replacements (used): Rod Sieb (Aberdeen GSFP), Richard Maxton (Glasgow Hawks), Alastair Davidson (Borders), Gordon Sykes (Ayr), Stephen MacKinnon (Glasgow Hutchesons Aloysians) (not used): Colin Gregor, Iain Monaghan, Alan Brown

Scottish Exiles: Martin Worthington (Manchester); Sam Cox (Caerphilly), Graeme Kiddie (Plymouth Albion), Paul Baird (Bedford), Alistair Hall (Moseley); Allan Mitchell (Coventry), Ross Blake (Bath); Carl Ambrose (Westcombe Park), Andy Dalgleish (Moseley), Andrew Grierson (Reading), David Whitehead (Castres), John Gunson (Ballynahinch), Chris Capaldi (Plymouth Albion), Lance Hamilton (Wakefield), David Partington (Dings Crusaders)
Replacements (used): David Michael (Reading), Shane Auld (Tynedale), Greg McDonald (Moseley), Rob Chrystie (Bath), Jon Summers (Reading) (not used): R Aitchison, C Richardson.

==== Match 5 ====
4 February 2003
14:30

Scotland U21	14-34	(Scotland) Glasgow
Try: Chris Cusiter; Ally Hogg; Con: Phil Godman (2)	Preview; Report; Report	Try: Jon Petrie; Michael Bartlett; Andrew Wilson (3); Ian McInroy; Con: Barry Irving (2)

Hallhill, Dunbar
Referee: Malcolm Changleng (Borders)

Scotland U21: Alistair Warnock (Boroughmuir and Scottish Institute of Sport); Andrew Turnbull (Watsonians), Graeme Morrison (Glasgow Hawks), Tom Philip (Edinburgh Rugby and Scottish Institute of Sport), Colin Shaw (Glasgow Hawks); Philip Godman (Newcastle Falcons and Scottish Institute of Sport), Chris Cusiter (Boroughmuir and Scottish Institute of Sport); Alasdair Dickinson (Dundee HSFP and Scottish Institute of Sport), Fergus Thomson (West of Scotland and Scottish Institute of Sport), John Malakoty (Glasgow Hawks), Alasdair Strokosch (Boroughmuir and Scottish Institute of Sport), Mark Rennie (Newcastle Falcons), Steve Swindall (Glasgow Hawks), Ally Hogg (Edinburgh Rugby and Scottish Institute of Sport) captain, David Callam (Hawick and Scottish Institute of Sport)
Replacements (all used): James Henry (Leicester Tigers), Kelly Brown (Melrose and Scottish Institute of Sport), Andrew Miller (Gala), Mark McMillan (Stirling County and Scottish Institute of Sport), Jonathan Rimmer (Pontypridd), Iain Berthinussen (Gala).
Glasgow: Rory Kerr; Michael Bartlett, Alan Bulloch, Andrew Henderson, Roland Reid; Barry Irving, Chris Black; Gordon Macfadyen (Glasgow Hawks), Ben Daly, Andrew Kelly, Justin Reid (Glasgow Hutchesons Aloysians), Nathan Ross, Jon Petrie, Paul Burke (Ayr), Gordon Simpson.
Replacements (all used) : Stephen MacKinnon (Glasgow Hutchesons Aloysians), Gavin Mories (Glasgow Hawks), Stuart Male (Glasgow Hawks), Cameron Blades, Andrew Wilson, Tommy Hayes, Ian McInroy.

=== European Champions Cup ===
==== Pool 3 ====
Team	P	W	D	L	Tries for	Tries against	Try diff	Points for	Points against	Points diff	Pts
(Wales) Llanelli	6	5	0	1	22	16	6	201	130	71	10
(France) Bourgoin	6	4	0	2	21	14	7	190	142	48	8
(Scotland) Glasgow Rugby	6	2	0	4	9	23	−14	86	185	−99	4
(England) Sale Sharks	6	1	0	5	16	15	1	123	143	−20	2

==== Results ====
===== Round 1 =====
12 October 2002
14:30

Llanelli (Wales)	45–15	(Scotland) Glasgow
Try: Evans; Boobyer; Peel (2); Madden; Con: S Jones (4); Pen: Jones (3); Bowen	Report; Report; Report; Report; Report	Try: Jason White; Donnie Macfadyen; Con: Tommy Hayes; Pen: Tommy Hayes

Stradey Park, Llanelli
Attendance: 5,784
Referee: Giulio De Santis (Italy)

===== Round 2 =====
18 October 2002
19:30

Glasgow (Scotland)	26–14	(England) Sale Sharks
Try: Jason White; Jon Petrie; Con: Tommy Hayes (2); Pen: Tommy Hayes (4)	Report; Report; Report; Report	Try: Pinkerton; Pen: Walshe (3)

Hughenden, Glasgow
Attendance: 5,283
Referee: Didier Mené (France)

===== Round 3 =====
8 December 2002
15:00

Bourgoin (France)	35–21	(Scotland) Glasgow
Try: Tuni (2); Coux; Peclier (2); Con: Peclier (2); Pen: Peclier (2)	Report; Report; Report	Try: Calvin Howarth; Nathan Ross; Gordon Simpson; Con: Calvin Howarth (3)

Stade Pierre Rajon, Bourgoin-Jallieu
Attendance: 8,500
Referee: Chris White (England)

===== Round 4 =====
13 December 2002
19:30

Glasgow (Scotland)	13–12	(France) Bourgoin
Try: Glenn Metcalfe; Con: Tommy Hayes; Pen: Tommy Hayes; Calvin Howarth	Preview; Report; Report; Report	Pen: Peclier (4)

Hughenden, Glasgow
Attendance: 2,867
Referee: Giulio De Santis (Italy)

===== Round 5 =====
10 January 2003
19:45

Sale Sharks (England)	45–3	(Scotland) Glasgow
Try: Mark Cueto; Steve Hanley; Jason Robinson; Titterrell; Going; Charlie Hodgson; Con: Charlie Hodgson (6); Pen: Charlie Hodgson	Preview; Report; Report; Report; Report; Report	Pen: Tommy Hayes

Heywood Road
Attendance: 3,967
Referee: Huw Watkins (Wales)

===== Round 6 =====
17 January 2003
19:30

Glasgow (Scotland)	8–34	(Wales) Llanelli
Try: Jon Steel; Pen: Tommy Hayes	Preview; Report	Try: Garan Evans (3); Barry Davies; Madden; Stephen Jones; Con: Stephen Jones (2)

Hughenden, Glasgow
Attendance: 3,207
Referee: Tony Spreadbury (England)

=== Celtic League ===
==== Pool B ====
	Team	Pld	W	D	L	PF	PA	PD	TF	TA	Try bonus	Losing bonus	Pts
1	(Wales) Pontypridd	7	6	0	1	182	120	+62	15	12	2	0	26
2	(Scotland) Glasgow	7	5	0	2	216	166	+50	22	20	2	1	23
3	(Wales) Cardiff	7	4	0	3	178	151	+27	17	12	2	2	20
4	(Ireland) Connacht	7	5	0	2	126	176	−50	11	17	0	0	20
5	(Ireland) Leinster	7	3	0	4	191	154	+37	22	14	3	3	18
6	(Scotland) Border Reivers	7	2	0	5	142	169	−27	15	11	1	3	12
7	(Wales) Bridgend	7	2	0	5	127	187	−60	11	20	1	1	10
8	(Wales) Newport	7	1	0	6	121	160	−39	9	16	0	4	8
Under the standard bonus point system, points are awarded as follows: 4 points for a win; 2 points for a draw; 1 bonus point for scoring 4 tries (or more) (Try bonus); 1 bonus point for losing by 7 points (or fewer) (Losing bonus)
Green background (rows 1 to 4) qualify for the knock-out stage. Source: RaboDirect PRO12

==== Results ====
===== Round 1 =====
31 August 2002
14:30

Cardiff (Wales)	35–44	(Scotland) Glasgow
Try: Ryan Powell; Allen; Rhys Williams; M Williams; Con: Harris (3); Pen: Harris (3)	Report; Report; Report	Try: Michael Bartlett; Donnie Macfadyen; Graeme Beveridge; Gordon Simpson; Alan Bulloch; Con: Tommy Hayes (3); Calvin Howarth (2); Pen: Tommy Hayes (2); Calvin Howarth

Cardiff Arms Park
Attendance: 7,000
Referee: Simon McDowell (Ireland)

===== Round 2 =====
6 September 2002
19:30

Glasgow (Scotland)	25–21	(Ireland) Leinster
Try: Tommy Hayes; Stuart Moffat; Jon Steel; Con: Tommy Hayes; Calvin Howarth; Pen: Tommy Hayes (2)	Preview; Report; Report	Try: Gissing; Lewis; Con: O'Meara; Pen: O'Meara (3)

Hughenden, Glasgow
Attendance: 4,250
Referee: Nigel Whitehouse (Wales)

===== Round 3 =====
14 September 2002
14:30

Newport (Wales)	25–31	(Scotland) Glasgow
Try: Forster; Powell; Snow; Con: Strange (2); Pen: Strange (2)	Report; Report; Report; Report	Try: Gordon Simpson; Tommy Hayes; Stuart Moffat; Con: Tommy Hayes (2); Pen: Tommy Hayes (4)

Rodney Parade
Attendance: 4,500
Referee: Alan Taylor (Ireland)

===== Round 4 =====
20 September 2002
19:30

Glasgow (Scotland)	47–11	(Wales) Bridgend
Try: Alan Bulloch (2); Glenn Metcalfe; Gordon Simpson; Graeme Beveridge; Con: Tommy Hayes (5); Pen: Tommy Hayes (4)	Preview; Report; Report; Report	Try: Gareth Williams; Pen: C Warlow (2)

Hughenden, Glasgow
Attendance: 4,500
Referee: Donal Courtney (Ireland)

===== Round 5 =====
28 September 2002
14:30

Pontypridd (Wales)	34–28	(Scotland) Glasgow
Try: Parker; Sweeney; M Rees; Owen; Con: Davey (4); Pen: Davey (2)	Preview; Report; Report; Report; Report	Try: Stuart Moffat; Alan Bulloch; Andrew Wilson; Con: Tommy Hayes (2); Pen: Tommy Hayes (3)

Sardis Road
Attendance: 5,500
Referee: Roy Maybank (England)

===== Round 6 =====
4 October 2002
19:30

Border Reivers (Scotland)	33–12	(Scotland) Glasgow
Try: Cranston; Paterson; Sititi; Utterson; Nikki Walker; Con: Utterson (4)	Preview; Report; Report	Pen: Tommy Hayes (4)

Netherdale
Attendance: 5,500
Referee: Robin Goodliffe (England)

===== Round 7 =====
25 October 2002
19:30

Glasgow (Scotland)	29–7	(Ireland) Connacht
Try: Stuart Moffat; Calvin Howarth; Donnie Macfadyen; Con: Calvin Howarth; Pen: Calvin Howarth (4)	Preview; Report; Report; Report; Report; Report	Try: Dan McFarland; Con: Mark McHugh

Hughenden, Glasgow
Attendance: 3,250
Referee: H Watkins (Wales)

==== Knock-out stage ====
===== Quarter-finals =====
30 November 2002
14:45

Glasgow (Scotland)	17–20	(Ireland) Ulster
Try: Jon Steel; Pen: Tommy Hayes (4)	Preview; Report; Report	Try: Paul Shields; Andy Ward; Con: David Humphreys (2); Pen: David Humphreys (2)

Hughenden, Glasgow
Attendance: 5,346
Referee: Nigel Williams (Wales)

=== Bank of Scotland Pro Cup ===
12 matches were played in all in the league; with only three teams, each played eight matches. This meant only one match was played on a given day and each team sat out four match days.

==== League table ====
Team	P	W	D	L	PF	PA	+/−	TBP	LBP	Pts
Edinburgh	8	5	1	2	266	140	+126	4	2	28
Border Reivers	8	4	0	4	164	224	−60	2	0	18
Glasgow	8	2	1	5	144	210	−66	1	0	11

==== Results ====
===== Match 1 =====
1 November 2002

Edinburgh (Scotland)	29–13	(Scotland) Glasgow
Try: Jacobsen (2); Con: Laney (2); Pen: Laney (4); Hodge	Preview; Report	Try: Jon Petrie; Con: Calvin Howarth; Pen: Calvin Howarth (2)

Meadowbank Stadium
Referee: Franck Maciello (France)

===== Match 2 =====
26 December 2002

Glasgow (Scotland)	10–10	(Scotland) Edinburgh
Try: Roland Reid; Joe Naufahu	Report	Try: Laney; Con: Laney; Pen: Laney

Hughenden, Glasgow
Attendance: 4,327
Referee: John Hogg (Hawick)

===== Match 3 =====
31 December 2002
14:30

Border Reivers (Scotland)	21–6	(Scotland) Glasgow
Try: Cranston; Gregor Townsend; Con: Utterson; Pen: Utterson (3)	Preview; Preview; Report; Report; Report	Pen: Calvin Howarth (2)

Netherdale, Galashiels
Referee: Nigel Owens (WRFU)

===== Match 5 =====
24 January 2003
19:30

Edinburgh (Scotland)	37–9	(Scotland) Glasgow
Try: Laney (2); Smith; Penalty try Con: Laney (3); Paterson; Pen: Laney (3)	Preview; Preview; Report; Report	Pen: Calvin Howarth (3)

Meadowbank Stadium, Edinburgh
Attendance: 4,107
Referee: N Williams (Wales)

===== Match 6 =====
31 January 2003
19:30

Glasgow (Scotland)	19–42	(Scotland) Border Reivers
Try: Glenn Metcalfe; Andrew Wilson; Nathan Ross; Con: Calvin Howarth (2)	Report	Try: Morton (2); Sititi; Armstrong; Walker; Con: Vili (4); Pen: Vili (3)

Hughenden, Glasgow
Referee: J-P Matheu (France)

===== Match 8 =====
4 April 2003
19:30

Glasgow (Scotland)	45–33	(Scotland) Edinburgh
Try: Rory Kerr; Calvin Howarth (2); Joe Naufahu; Glenn Metcalfe (2); Con: Calvin Howarth (3); Pen: Calvin Howarth (3)	Report; Report	Try: Philip (2); Murray; Dougie Hall; Con: Hodge (2); Pen: Hodge (3)

Hughenden, Glasgow
Referee: E Darriere (France)

===== Match 9 =====
11 April 2003
19:30

Border Reivers (Scotland)	28–19	(Scotland) Glasgow
Try: Morton; Douglas; Feather; Walker; Con: Vili; Pen: Vili (2)	Preview; Report; Report; Report	Try: Andrew Henderson; Con: Calvin Howarth; Pen: Calvin Howarth (4)

Netherdale, Galashiels
Referee: G Ashton-Jones (RFU)

===== Match 11 =====
25 April 2003

Glasgow (Scotland)	23–10	(Scotland) Border Reivers
Try: Rory Kerr; Graeme Beveridge; Con: Barry Irving (2); Pen: Barry Irving (3)	Report; Report	Try: Morton; Con: Thomson; Pen: Thomson

Hughenden, Glasgow
Referee: Martin Fox (England)
