= 2002–03 Scottish Inter-District Championship =

- Countries: Scotland
- Champions: Edinburgh
- Runners-up: Border Reivers
- Matches played: 12

The 2002–03 Scottish Inter-District Championship was a rugby union competition for Scotland's professional district teams. With the re-emergence of the Border Reivers professional team and the collapse of the Welsh-Scottish League to make way for a shortened Celtic League, the Scottish Rugby Union (SRU) reinstated the Scottish Inter-District Championship for the professional sides. Glasgow, Borders and Edinburgh then fought it out in a renamed Pro Cup sponsored by Bank of Scotland.

The Bank of Scotland Pro Cup lasted one year. When the Celtic League was expanded the following year the SRU realised that there was no room in the schedule for a separate Scottish Inter-District Championship. This was despite both sponsor and fans happiness with the return of a national tournament. (The desire for national bragging rights later led the SRU to establish the 1872 Cup in 2007–08 season using the Celtic League matches to determine the winner.)

== 2002-03 League Table ==
Team	P	W	D	L	PF	PA	+/-	TBP	LBP	Pts
Edinburgh	8	5	1	2	266	140	+126	4	2	28
Border Reivers	8	4	0	4	164	224	-60	2	0	18
Glasgow	8	2	1	5	144	210	-66	1	0	11

== Results ==
=== Match 1 ===
1 November 2002

Edinburgh (Scotland)	29-13	(Scotland) Glasgow
Try: Jacobsen x 2 Con: Laney x 2 Pen: Laney x 4 Hodge	Preview; Report	Try: Jon Petrie; Con: Calvin Howarth; Pen: Calvin Howarth x 2

Meadowbank Stadium
Referee: Franck Maciello (France)

=== Match 2 ===
26 December 2002

Glasgow (Scotland)	10-10	(Scotland) Edinburgh
Try: Roland Reid; Joe Naufahu	Report	Try: Laney; Con: Laney; Pen: Laney

Hughenden Stadium
Attendance: 4327
Referee: John Hogg (Hawick)

=== Match 3 ===
31 December 2002
14:30

Border Reivers (Scotland)	21-6	(Scotland) Glasgow
Try: Cranston; Gregor Townsend; Con: Utterson; Pen: Utterson x 3	Preview; Preview; Report; Report; Report	Pen: Calvin Howarth x 2

Netherdale
Referee: Nigel Owens (WRFU)

=== Match 4 ===
3 January 2003
19:30

Edinburgh (Scotland)	46-13	(Scotland) Border Reivers
Try: Sharman (9, 61), Blair (17), Paterson (26, 49), Hogg (56), Dall (71); Con: Laney (17, 26, 49, 56); Pen: Laney (42)	Report	Try: Utterson (67); Con: Utterson (67); Pen: Utterson (13, 28)

Murrayfield Stadium
Referee: M Fox (England)

=== Match 5 ===
24 January 2003
19:30

Edinburgh (Scotland)	37-9	(Scotland) Glasgow
Try: Laney x 2 Smith penalty try Con: Laney x 3 Paterson; Pen: Laney x 3	Preview; Preview; Report; Report	Pen: Calvin Howarth x 3

Meadowbank Stadium
Attendance: 4107
Referee: N Williams (Wales)

=== Match 6 ===
31 January 2003
19:30

Glasgow (Scotland)	19-42	(Scotland) Border Reivers
Try: Glenn Metcalfe; Andrew Wilson; Nathan Ross; Con: Calvin Howarth x 2	Report	Try: Morton x 2 Sititi; Armstrong; Walker; Con: Vili x 4 Pen: Vili x 3

Hughenden Stadium
Referee: J-P Matheu (France)

=== Match 7 ===
7 February 2003
19:30

Border Reivers (Scotland)	23-54	(Scotland) Edinburgh
Try: Townsend; Feather; Con: Vili x 2 Pen: Vili x 3	Report	Try: Lee x 2 Webster; Brendan Laney; Dougie Hall; Mike Blair; Chris Paterson; Allan Jacobsen; Con: Brendan Laney x 5 Duncan Hodge x 2

Referee: R Maybank (England)

=== Match 8 ===
4 April 2003
19:30

Glasgow (Scotland)	45-33	(Scotland) Edinburgh
Try: Rory Kerr; Calvin Howarth x 2 Joe Naufahu; Glenn Metcalfe x 2 Con: Calvin Howarth x 3 Pen: Calvin Howarth x 3	Report; Report	Try: Philip x 2 Murray; Dougie Hall; Con: Hodge x 2 Pen: Hodge x 3

Hughenden Stadium
Referee: E Darriere (France)

=== Match 9 ===
11 April 2003
19:30

Border Reivers (Scotland)	28-19	(Scotland) Glasgow
Try: Morton; Douglas; Feather; Walker; Con: Vili; Pen: Vili x 2	Preview; Report; Report; Report	Try: Andrew Henderson; Con: Calvin Howarth; Pen: Calvin Howarth x 4

Netherdale
Referee: G Ashton-Jones (RFU)

=== Match 10 ===
18 April 2003

Edinburgh (Scotland)	44-7	(Scotland) Border Reivers
	Report; Report

=== Match 11 ===
25 April 2003

Glasgow (Scotland)	23-10	(Scotland) Border Reivers
Try: Rory Kerr; Graeme Beveridge; Con: Barry Irving x 2 Pen: Barry Irving x 3	Report; Report	Try: Morton; Con: Thomson; Pen: Thomson

Hughenden Stadium
Referee: Martin Fox (England)

=== Match 12 ===
2 May 2003

Border Reivers (Scotland)	20-13	(Scotland) Edinburgh
	Report; Report
