= Ben Daly =

Australian rugby union player (born 1975)

- Born: 4 October 1975 (age 51) Leeds
- Height: 6 ft 2 in (1.88 m)
- Weight: 105 kg (16 st 7 lb)

Rugby union career
- Position: Hooker
Amateur team(s)
Years	Team	Apps	(Points)
- Sydney University
Senior career
Years	Team	Apps	(Points)
2000-02	New South Wales Waratahs		
2002-3	Glasgow Warriors	7	(0)
2003-5	Worcester Warriors		
2005-6	Viadana		
2006-2008	Newport Gwent Dragons		

Ben Daly is an Australian former rugby union player. He played his club rugby for various clubs including Glasgow Warriors, Worcester Warriors and Newport Gwent Dragons.

Scottish-Qualified as both his parents are Scottish, Daly had a training contract with the New South Wales Waratahs when he decided to move to Scotland to play rugby, in the home city of his parents.

He signed for Glasgow Warriors in 2002 making his debut in the pre-season match against Harlequins. He played 4 matches in the Celtic League in the 2002–03 season, 2 in the 2002-03 Scottish Inter-District Championship and 1 in the Heineken Cup.

He moved from Glasgow to sign for the Worcester Warriors in England before moving to Italian side Viadana.

He signed for Newport Gwent Dragons in 2006 but retired at the end of the 2007–08 season.
