= Ellon RFC =

Scottish rugby union club, based in Ellon

(Scotland) Ellon Rugby (Craig Parslow RFC)
- Full name: Ellon Rugby (Craig Parslow RFC)
- Founded: 1977; 49 years ago
- Location: Ellon, Scotland
- Ground(s): The Meadows, The Deer Park
- Chairman: Kieran O’Brien
- Director of Rugby: Craig Parslow
- Coach: Craig Parslow
- Captain: Kieran O'Brien
- League: Caledonia Division One North
- 2025–26: Scottish National League Division Four (withdrawn)
Team kit

Official website
- www.ellonrugby.org

Ellon Rugby are a rugby union side based in Ellon, Aberdeenshire.

== History ==
The team was established in 1977 and play their home games at The Meadows. The club itself has a well established youth and junior section with players ranging from 4 to 18 years regularly playing rugby.

The club has recently rebranded itself as Ellon Rugby.

=== Past Presidents ===
- 1978-79 - D.W. Orr
- 1979-80 - C. Smith
- 1980-81 - K.A.K. Gill
- 1981-82 - G.P.W. Hall
- 1982-85 - M.L.Jenkins
- 1985-88 - A. Park
- 1988-91 - A.J.G. Patterson
- 1991-93 - K.D. Wilkinson
- 1993-94 - C. Henry
- 1994-95 - R. Porteous
- 1995-97 - W. Graham
- 1997-99 - D.P.F. Newman
- 1999-01 - K.J.F. McDade
- 2001-02 - H.R. Buchanan
- 2002-08 - A. Park
- 2008-10 - S. Park
- 2010-12 - C. Tennant
- 2012-15 - R. Porteous
- 2015-17 - P. Vavangas
- 2017-17 - J. Addy
- 2017-20 - G. Heath
- 2020-22 - A. Gordon
- 2022-?? - J. Coutts

=== Past Captains ===
- 1977-79 - D. Orr
- 1979-80 - A. Giles
- 1980-81 - R. Anderson
- 1981-82 - W. Manly
- 1982-83 - A. Kidwell
- 1983-84 - R. Porteous
- 1984-85 - R. Anderson
- 1985-86 - A. Block
- 1986-87 - D. Baxter
- 1987-89 - C. Henry
- 1989-90 - W. Cumming
- 1990-91 - P. Westgarth
- 1991-92 - C. Henry
- 1992-94 - D. Fraser
- 1994-95 - S. Munro
- 1995-01 - S. Park
- 2001-03 - N. Hendry
- 2003-05 - S. Park
- 2005-08 - R. Kenny
- 2008-11 - S. Johnston
- 2011-12 - M. Evans
- 2012-13 - C. Scott
- 2013-14 - L. Slaven
- 2014-15 - N. Fraser
- 2015-17 - C. Cruickshank
- 2017-19 - B. Shirron
- 2019-24 - B. Fraser
- 2024-26 - S. Whyte
- 2026-?? - K. O'Brien

== Seasons ==
For the 2026/27 season, Ellon will compete in Arnold Clark Caledonian Div 1. Under 18, Under 16 and Under 15 boys will compete in the inspiresport Caledonia Youth League, while the Under 14 and Under 13 Youth sides compete in Caledonia (North).

Ellon Golden Oldies side were the 2017 hosts for the 9th Scottish Golden Oldies Festival held on 6 May 2017.

They won the BT Bowl in 2002 and reached the final of the BT Shield in 2006.

=== 2004/05 season ===
Competitions: National League 1 & Scottish Cup

=== 2005/06 season ===
Competitions: Premiership 3 & Scottish Cup

=== 2006/07 season ===
Competitions: Premiership 3 & Scottish Cup

=== 2007/08 season ===
Competitions: Premiership 3 & Scottish Cup

=== 2008/09 season ===
Competitions: Premiership 3 & Scottish Cup

=== 2009/10 season ===
Competitions: Premiership 3 & Scottish Cup

=== 2010/11 season ===
Competitions: Premiership 3 & Scottish Cup

=== 2011/12 season ===
Competitions: National League 1

The league was restructured after this season where National 1 was dropped in favour of regionalizing it.

National League Division 1

Team	P	W	L	D	Points
Hawick YM (P)	22	21	1	0	98
Musselburgh (P)	22	20	2	0	94
Murrayfield Wanderers (P)	22	14	8	0	75
Dunfermline (P)	22	16	6	0	75
RHC Cougars (R)	22	13	9	0	62
Kilmarnock (R)	21	11	8	2	56
Ellon (R)	22	9	13	0	43
Langholm (R)	21	8	13	0	37
Edinburgh University (R)	22	7	14	1	35
Linlithgow (R)	22	5	16	1	27
Garnock (R)	22	4	17	1	23
Livingston (R)	22	0	21	1	0

=== 2012/13 season ===
Competitions: RBS Caledonia Division 1 & RBS Shield
Played 22, won 10, lost 12

Ellon lost the final of the RBS Caledonia Shield to Aberdeenshire.

RBS Caledonia League Division 1

Team	P	W	L	D	Points
Aberdeenshire	18	16	2	0	79
Caithness	18	11	7	0	55
St Andrews Uni	18	9	8	1	49
Gordonians	18	9	9	0	46
Orkney	18	8	10	0	42
Mackie Academy FP	18	8	10	0	42
Strathmore	18	8	9	1	38
Ellon	18	7	11	0	36
Highland	18	7	11	0	33
Hillfoots	18	5	11	2	32

=== 2013/14 season ===
Competitions: RBS Caledonia Division 1 & RBS Shield
Played 19, won 5, lost 13, Drawn 1

Ellon were knocked out in the first round of the RBS Shield by Dunfermline.

RBS Caledonia League Division 1

Team	P	W	L	D	Points
Perthshire	18	14	3	1	72
Dunfermline	18	14	4	0	66
Orkney	18	13	5	0	66
Caithness	18	12	6	0	61
Strathmore	18	7	9	2	43
Morgan Academy FP	18	8	10	0	36
Gordonians	18	6	12	0	35
Mackie Academy FP	18	5	13	0	31
Ellon	18	5	12	1	29
St Andrews	18	4	14	0	13

=== 2014/15 season ===
Competitions: BT Caledonia Division 1 & BT Shield

Ellon were knocked out in the first round of the BT Shield by Glenrothes.

=== 2015/16 season ===
Competitions: BT Caledonia Division 2 (North) & BT Shield
Played 17, won 4, lost 13
Pretty much a season to start rebuilding the squad with a number of departures after getting relegated from Div 1. More further away travel required than the 1XV had previously been used to with travel to Shetland and Stornoway.
Ellon were knocked out in the first round of the BT Shield by Dunfermline.

BT Caledonia League Division 2 North (North)

Team	P	W	L	D	Points
Deeside	16	14	2	0	70
Aberdeen Wanderers	16	13	3	0	62
Garioch	16	12	4	0	59
Ross Sutherland	16	11	5	0	51
Moray	16	7	9	0	37
Shetland	16	5	11	0	24
Ellon	16	4	12	0	23
Stornoway	16	3	13	0	17
Lochaber	16	3	13	0	17

=== 2016/17 season ===
Competitions: BT Caledonia Division 2 (North) & BT Bowl
Played 16, won 9, lost 6
With 12 teams entered into Caledonia Div 2 North, it was decided to split then into two leagues, East and West. Once each league played each other home and away, the top 3 of each will play each other for promotion and the bottom 3 of each will play each other for relegation. Any points earned from the other two from the original league were carried over. Ellon played in the East league the first half of the season.
Ellon eventually withdraw from the BT Bowl in the second round.

BT Caledonia League Division 2 North (East)

Team	P	W	L	D	Points
Banff	10	9	1	0	45
Garioch	10	9	1	0	45
Aberdeen Grammar 2XV	10	5	4	1	29
Ellon	9	3	6	0	17
Shetland	9	1	7	1	8
Deeside	10	1	9	0	4

BT Caledonia League Division 2 North (Bottom)

Team	P	W	L	D	Points
Ellon	10	9	1	0	44
Stornoway	10	8	2	0	37
Ross Sutherland	10	5	5	0	24
Deeside	10	4	6	0	20
Shetland	10	3	7	0	17
Lochaber	10	1	9	0	7

=== 2017/18 season ===
Competitions: BT Caledonia Division 2 (North) & BT Bowl

Played 23, won 17, lost 6

Although eventually finishing 2nd in the league, ended up gaining promotion after no team were relegated from National 3 and the 2nd placed team in Caledonia Div 2 (Midlands) declined a playoff.
Ellon were knocked out in the semi-finals of the Caledonia Bowl against Aberdeen University.

Team	P	W	L	D	Points
Garioch	17	13	4	0	70
Ellon	18	13	5	0	66
Highland 2XV	16	12	3	1	64
Mackie Academy FP	18	12	6	0	63
Moray	18	10	8	0	53
Ross Sutherland	18	9	8	1	50
Aberdeen Grammar 2XV	17	7	9	1	39
Shetland	15	4	11	0	19
Deeside	17	2	14	1	14
Stornoway	18	2	16	0	11
RAF Lossiemouth	0	0	0	0	0
Aberdeen Uni Medics	0	0	0	0	0

RAF Lossiemouth withdrew from league due to operational reasons.
Aberdeen Uni Medics removed from league for failing to fulfil fixtures.

=== 2018/19 season ===
Competitions: Tennent's Caledonia Division 1 & Caledonia Regional Shield

Played 19, won 8, lost 11

Ellon were knocked out in the quarter finals of the Regional Shield by Dunfermline.

Team	P	W	L	D	Points
Strathmore	16	16	0	0	79
Dunfermline	16	14	2	0	68
Glenrothes	16	11	4	1	58
Grangemouth	16	9	6	1	47
Ellon Rugby	16	7	9	0	39
Hillfoots	16	5	11	0	30
Alloa	16	3	13	0	18
Harris Academy FP	16	3	13	0	4

=== 2019/20 season ===
Competitions: Tennent's Caledonia Division 1 & Caledonia Regional Shield

Played 13, Won 9, Lost 4

Season declared null and void in March 2020 due to Covid

Team	P	W	L	D	Points
Orkney	11	11	0	0	55
Ellon Rugby	13	9	4	0	47
Dunfermline	12	10	2	0	46
Aberdeen Wanderers	12	8	4	0	40
Grangemouth	12	7	5	1	37
Hillfoots	14	5	9	0	20
Blairgowrie	15	4	11	0	18
Garioch	13	1	11	1	10
Alloa	13	2	11	0	5

=== 2020/21 season ===
Competitions: BT Caledonia Division 1

Season cancelled because of covid.

=== 2021/22 season ===
Competitions: Tennent's Caledonia Division 1

Team	P	W	L	D	Points
Orkney	16	13	3	0	67
Dunfermline	16	13	3	0	60
Ellon Rugby	16	10	5	0	55
Caithness	16	9	7	0	48
Grangemouth	16	7	8	1	43
Hillfoots	16	8	7	0	40
Blairgowrie	16	5	11	0	21
Aberdeen Wanderers	16	4	11	1	17
Glenrothes	16	1	15	0	7

=== 2022/23 season ===
Competitions: Tennent's Caledonia Division 1 and National Shield

Played 12, won 8, lost 4

Ellon were knocked out in the second Round of the National Shield by Moray.

Due to National League restructuring, Ellon played Stewartry to see who got promoted. Ellon lost 24-30 in a game played at Burnbrae.

Team	P	W	L	D	Points
Dunfermline	10	8	2	0	43
Ellon Rugby	10	8	2	0	41
Grangemouth	10	6	3	1	32
Aberdeenshire	10	4	6	0	25
Caithness	10	3	6	1	18
Aberdeen Wanderers	10	0	10	0	-2

Hillfoots disqualified from the league 20/03/23

=== 2023/24 season ===
Competitions: BT Caledonia Division 1 and BT National Shield

Played 13, Won 7, Lost 6

Ellon withdrew from the National Shield in Round 2

Team	P	W	L	D	Points
Moray	12	10	2	0	51
Aberdeenshire	12	9	3	0	45
Highland 2XV	12	8	4	0	44
Mackie	12	4	8	0	28
Caithness	12	5	7	0	27
Ellon	12	6	6	0	26
RAF Lossiemouth *	0	0	0	0	0
Aberdeen Wanderers	12	0	11	0	-8

* RAF Lossiemouth withdrew from league due to operational duties.

Top 3 teams from conference will play home and away against midlands conference to decide league positions.

=== 2024/25 season ===
Competitions: Arnold Clark Caledonia Division 1 and BT National Shield

After the play-offs were complete, Ellon were crowned winners of Caledonia Div1 and earned promotion to National 4!

Ellon were knocked out by Lenzie in the semi-final of the National Shield who went on to win.

Played 20, Won 15, Lost 5

Arnold Clark Caledonia Div 1 (North Conference)

Team	P	W	L	D	Points
Aberdeenshire	12	9	3	0	45
Ellon	12	9	3	0	45
Mackie	12	7	5	0	43
Highland 2XV	12	6	6	0	38
Ross Sutherland	12	4	8	0	22
Caithness	11	3	8	0	17
North Police	11	3	8	0	7

Top 2 teams from conference will play home and away against midlands conference to decide league positions.

After making the top two of the North Conference, home and away games were played against Perthshire and Blairgowrie. Results from the Aberdeenshire games were carried forward to the play-offs.

Arnold Clark Caledonia Div 1 (Play-Offs)

Team	P	W	L	D	Points
Ellon	6	5	1	0	27
Perthshire	4	2	2	0	23
Blairgowrie	4	1	3	0	18
Aberdeenshire	2	0	2	0	1

Aberdeenshire withdraw from the playoffs. 10 points awarded to Perthshire and Blairgowrie.

=== 2025/26 Season ===
Competitions: Arnold Clark National League Division 4 and National League Cup

Ellon withdrew from the season due to player availability issues

Played 11, Won 2, Lost 9

=== 2026/27 Season ===
Competitions: Arnold Clark Caledonia Division 1 and BT National Shield

== Notable former players ==
=== Scotland Internationalists ===
The following former Ellon players have represented Scotland at full international level.

- (Scotland) Andrew Wilson
- (Scotland) Emma Wassell

=== Glasgow Warriors players ===
The following former Ellon players have represented Glasgow Warriors at professional level.

- (Scotland) Andrew Wilson
