= Jasmine Pereira =

New Zealand footballer

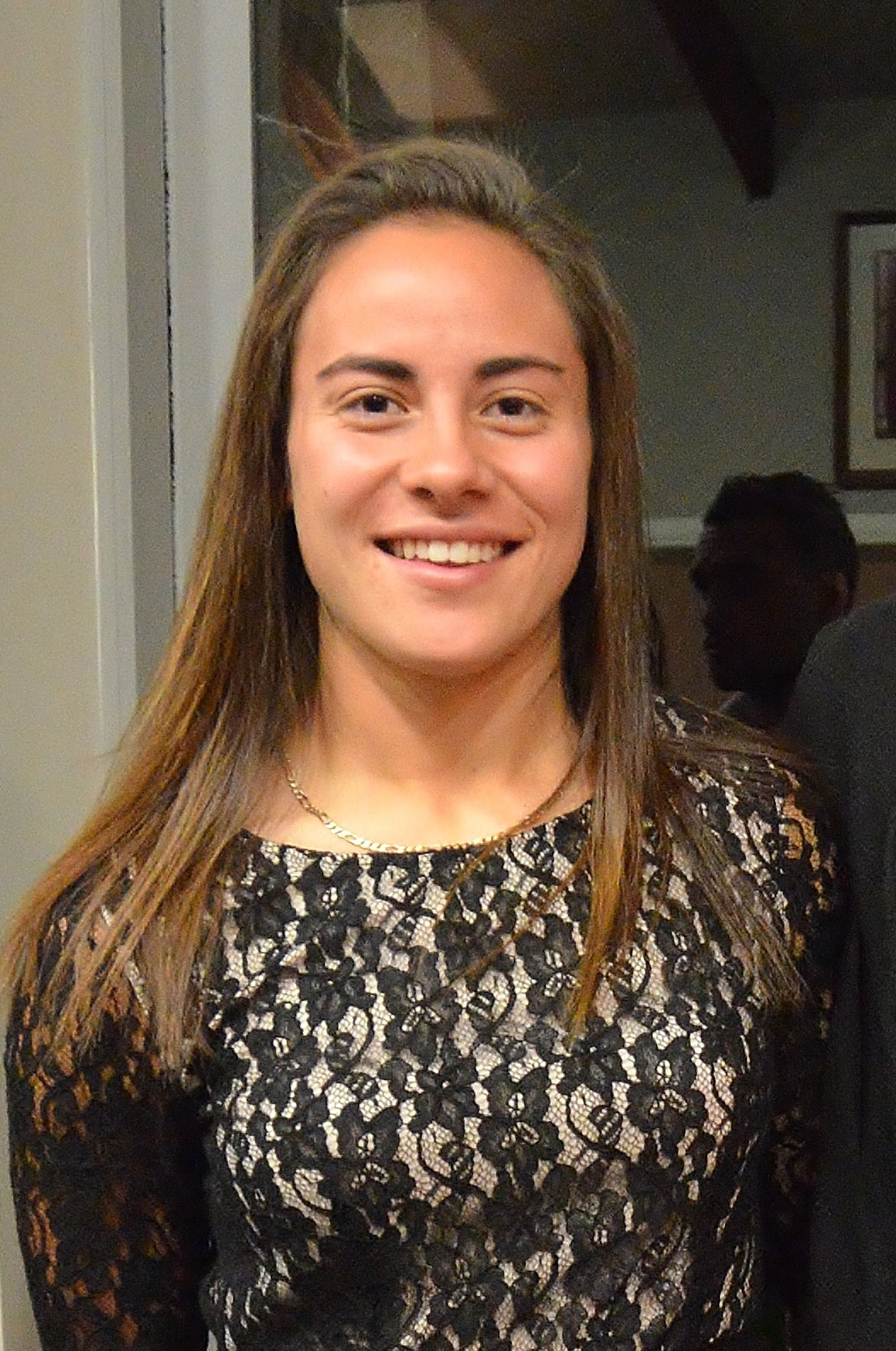
- Pereira in 2014

Personal information
- Full name: Jasmine Henrietta Pereira
- Date of birth: 20 July 1996 (age 30)
- Place of birth: Auckland, New Zealand
- Height: 1.68 m (5 ft 6 in)
- Position: Forward

Team information
- Current team: Three Kings United

International career^{‡}
Years	Team	Apps	(Gls)
2012	New Zealand u-17	3	(0)
2014–2016	New Zealand u-20	4	(0)
2014–2017	New Zealand	10	(0)
- ‡ National team caps and goals as of 10:32, 16 June 2015 (UTC)

Jasmine Henrietta Pereira (born 20 July 1996) is a New Zealand footballer who plays for Three Kings United and for New Zealand women's national football team.

== Personal life ==
Pereira is the youngest and only girl of four children of a Samoan Palagi couple, Joseph – a former rugby leaguer who played for Sydney's Wests Tigers – and Danira. She's cousin to the actors Joe and Rene Naufahu, who like uncle Joseph also played rugby. A native of West Auckland, Pereira soon grew an interest in sports, particularly WWE wrestling, which she watched and tried to imitate with her brothers, and netball, her primary sport until the age of 13. Once Avondale College made students choose one sport to focus on, and netball had a long sign-up queue due to many girls interested, Pereira opted to attend football classes instead. She was first assigned as a goalkeeper, due to her background in netball, but after her coaches saw Pereira run, she became a forward. She only finished school at the age of 18, sidelined by her football career and life incidents such as the death of her father. Pereira is studying psychology at Massey University, using a scholarship funded by the government.

== International career ==
Three years after enrolling on Avondale's football program, Pereira was a part of New Zealand women's national under-17 football team that competed in the 2012 FIFA U-17 Women's World Cup in Azerbaijan, playing all their three matches. With the U-17, she also was runner-up of the 2014 National Women's League.

In 2014, Pereira was promoted to the under-20 team, winning the 2014 OFC U-20 Women's Championship, and subsequently playing all of New Zealand's four matches in the 2014 FIFA U-20 Women's World Cup. The next year, Pereira was the captain of the New Zealand team who won the OFC U-20s, and was given the Golden Ball as the best player of the tournament.

Pereira made her debut with the senior New Zealand team, the "Football Ferns", at the 2014 OFC Women's Nations Cup. Team manager Tony Readings was interested in Pereira ever since the U-17, highlighting her speed and "competitive edge". In 2015, she was called to the New Zealand roster for the 2015 FIFA Women's World Cup, where she played two out of New Zealand's three matches. Pereira was also named for the Football Ferns team that would play the 2016 Olympics, being the youngest player in the squad and the only one alongside Meikayla Moore who never attended another Olympic tournament.

Some time after the 2017 Cyprus Women's Cup, where Pereira scored her first international goal, she announced to be stepping away from the national team, finding hard to balance the football with financial commitments, that forced her to move in with her mother and take two jobs. Working with her brother in civil construction, Pereira eventually became a qualified builder.
