= Opeta Palepoi =

Samoa international rugby union player

- Born: Opeta Palepoi; 2 December 1975 (age 50)
- Height: 1.95 m (6 ft 5 in)
- Weight: 106 kg (234 lb)

Rugby union career
- Position(s): Lock, Flanker
Amateur team(s)
Years	Team	Apps	(Points)
2000	Northern United		
2009-	Gala RFC		
Senior career
Years	Team	Apps	(Points)
2002–2003	Glasgow Warriors	1	(0)
2004–2005	Harlequins	2	(0)
2005–2007	Border Reivers	46	(25)
2007–2009	Glasgow Warriors	24	(0)
Provincial / State sides
Years	Team	Apps	(Points)
2000	Wellington	5	(0)
International career
Years	Team	Apps	(Points)
1998–2005	Samoa	48	(10)

Opeta Palepoi (born 2 December 1975) is a Samoan rugby union footballer, with 48 caps. He currently plays for Scottish side Gala RFC.

He has previously played for Glasgow Warriors, Border Reivers and English club Harlequins.

His first start for Glasgow Warriors was in season 2002–03. He played in the 2002–03 Scottish Inter-District Championship, the Bank of Scotland Pro Cup, against Border Reivers on 31 December 2002. The Warriors lost the match 21–6.

He is 1.95m tall and weighs 106 kg. He was also a part of the Samoa squad at the 2003 Rugby World Cup in Australia.
