= Gordon Sykes =

Scottish rugby union player

- Born: Gordon Sykes Scotland

Rugby union career
- Position: Tighthead Prop
Amateur team(s)
Years	Team	Apps	(Points)
- Ayr
Senior career
Years	Team	Apps	(Points)
2001-04	Glasgow Warriors		

Gordon Sykes (born Scotland) is a Scottish former rugby union player for Glasgow Warriors and Ayr, who played at the Tighthead Prop position.

== Amateur level ==
Sykes played for Ayr RFC.

He played for Ayr RFC in the British and Irish Cup.

== Professional level ==
In 2001-02 season, Sykes was called up for a combined Glasgow - Edinburgh team to face Newcastle Falcons 'A' side. He also played in the Glasgow side that faced Northampton Saints. He was named in Glasgow's squad to face the Scotland U21 side.

In season 2002-03, Sykes remained in Glasgow Warriors squad. He played for the Warriors in their match against Scottish Exiles. He was in Glasgow's side that faced Harlequins.

Sykes was a backup player for Glasgow Warriors for season 2003-04.
