= 1996–97 Scottish Inter-District Championship =

Rugby union competition

- Countries: Scotland
- Champions: Caledonia Reds
- Runners-up: Glasgow Warriors
- Matches played: 6

The 1996–97 Scottish Inter-District Championship rugby union Scottish Inter-District Championship was the first between the Scottish districts as professional teams.

Caledonia Reds won this first professional tournament. Indeed, it was the northern Scottish district's first and only outright title in their history, since the Scottish Inter-District Championship began in 1953-54. The Reds previously competed as the amateur district North and Midlands.

Glasgow and the Border Reivers also qualified for the Heineken Cup for the next season. In last place, Edinburgh would gain the Amlin Cup place next season.

== 1996-97 League Table ==
Team	P	W	D	L	PF	PA	+/-	Pts
Caledonia Reds	3	2	1	0	77	53	+24	5
Glasgow	3	2	0	1	63	51	+12	4
Border Reivers	3	1	1	1	59	61	-2	3
Edinburgh	3	0	0	3	35	69	-34	0

== Results ==
=== Round 1 ===
22 December 1996

Border Reivers	26 – 26	Caledonia Reds
	Report

Murrayfield Stadium
Referee: Ray Megson

22 December 1996

Glasgow	23 – 13	Edinburgh
	Preview; Report; Report

Murrayfield Stadium
Referee: K McCartney

=== Round 2 ===
29 December 1996

Edinburgh	13 – 31	Caledonia Reds
	Report

Murrayfield Stadium
Referee: E Murray

29 December 1996

Border Reivers	18 – 26	Glasgow
	Report

Murrayfield Stadium
Referee: Jim Fleming

=== Round 3 ===
5 January 1997

Border Reivers	15 – 9	Edinburgh
	Report

Poynder Park
Referee: S Piercy

5 January 1997

Caledonia Reds	20 – 14	Glasgow
	Report

Murrayfield Stadium
Referee: I Ramage

== Matches outwith the Championship ==
=== International matches ===
2 November 1996

Cities District	19 - 37	Australia
	Preview; Report

Old Anniesland

Cities District:
Australia:

5 November 1996

Combined Scottish Districts	9 - 25	Australia
	Report; Report

McDiarmid Park

Scottish Districts:
Australia:
