= Calvin Howarth =

New Zealand rugby union player

- Born: Calvin Howarth; 18 June 1976 (age 50) Auckland, New Zealand
- Height: 186 cm (6 ft 1 in)
- Weight: 96 kg (15 st 2 lb)
- University: Auckland University
- Notable relative(s): Shane Howarth, brother

Rugby union career
- Position: Fly-half
Amateur team(s)
Years	Team	Apps	(Points)
- Boroughmuir
–	Stirling County		
Senior career
Years	Team	Apps	(Points)
2001–2002	Edinburgh Rugby		
2002	→Glasgow Warriors	7	(30)
2002-06	Glasgow Warriors	70	(350)
2006-09	Viadana		
Provincial / State sides
Years	Team	Apps	(Points)
- North Harbour
International career
Years	Team	Apps	(Points)
2002	Scotland A	1	(0)

Calvin Howarth (born 18 June 1976 in Auckland, New Zealand) is a New Zealand born former Scotland 'A' international rugby union player. He plays at Fly-half.

Howarth was selected for Scotland A on the basis of a four-year residency period and played in Scotland's match against Romania in 2002 to confirm his Scottish nationality. His older brother Shane Howarth represented both New Zealand and Wales.

He moved from New Zealand where he played for North Harbour to Scotland. Playing for Boroughmuir from 1998 he helped the team rise through the divisions and also won the BT Cellnet Cup in 2001 beating Melrose. He secured a place with professional district side Edinburgh in 2001.

He was loaned to Glasgow Warriors in March 2002 when their fly-half Barry Irving was injured, as cover for their Cook Islands international fly-half Tommy Hayes. This move became permanent for the 2002-03 season.

He stayed at Glasgow Warriors until 2006-07 season when he moved to Italian side Viadana and stayed there until 2009.

Now back in Auckland, New Zealand, Howarth is a real estate consultant.
