= Stuart Moffat =

Scotland international rugby union player & cricketer

- Born: John Stuart David Moffat; 18 August 1977 (age 49) Edinburgh, Scotland
- Height: 6.30 ft (1.92 m)
- Weight: 15.10 st (95.9 kg)
- School: Edinburgh Academy, St Edmunds College
- University: Cambridge, Loughborough University

Rugby union career
- Position(s): Fullback, Wing
- Current team: retired
Amateur team(s)
Years	Team	Apps	(Points)
- Eastern Suburbs
–	Rotherham		
–	Cambridge University		
Senior career
Years	Team	Apps	(Points)
- Genoa
2002-04	Glasgow Warriors	38	(30)
–	Border Reivers		
International career
Years	Team	Apps	(Points)
2002-2004	Scotland	4	(5)
- Correct as of 25 June 2014

John Stuart David Moffat (born 18 August 1977 in Edinburgh) is a former Scottish rugby union international. He also played a first-class cricket match for Cambridge University.

== Rugby Union career ==
=== Amateur career ===
Moffat played for Edinburgh and Cambridge University, for whom he made two appearances in The Varsity Match against Oxford while studying as a postgraduate student.

=== Professional career ===
He has played for various clubs during his career including Castres in France, Viadana in Italy and Scottish professional district sides Glasgow Warriors and Border Reivers.

=== International career ===
Moffat made his Test debut in a match against Romania at Murrayfield in November 2002 and scored a try from full-back in a 27-point win. He played two further Tests in the same stadium that month, with Scotland defeating both South Africa and Fiji. Moffat's only other cap came two years later, again at Murrayfield, when Australia defeated Scotland by 31 points to 14 to claim the Hopetoun Cup.

He has played for various clubs during his career including Castres in France, Viadana in Italy and Scottish teams Borders and Edinburgh.

== Cricket career ==
=== Club career ===
His first-class cricket appearance was made in the 2002 University Match, against Oxford University. Moffat brought up a century off just 103 balls and had amassed 169 by the time Benjamin Vonwiller trapped him leg before wicket. It was the highest score by a cricketer playing their first match for Cambridge University since Test batsman Hubert Doggart made a double hundred in 1948. As Moffat did not bat again, either in that match or at first-class level, Moffat's career average remained 169.

=== International career ===
His performance was a contrast to his earlier efforts in 1997, when he scored ducks in two limited overs matches for a Scotland XI against Durham. He had also represented Scotland at Under-19 level.

== See also ==
- List of Scottish cricket and rugby union players
