= Steve Anderson (rugby union coach) =

Australian rugby league and union coach

Personal information
- Born: Steve Anderson; 1963 (age 62–63) Springsure, Queensland, Australia

Playing information
- Position: Centre, Five-eighth
Club
Years	Team	Pld	T	G	FG	P
1976–82	Emerald Tigers
1983	Fitzroy Sharks
1984	Surfersparadise Sharks
1984–85	BRL Past Brothers
1986–87	State League Gold Coast Vikings
1988–89	BRL Southern Suburbs
1988–89	Milton Keynes
	Total	0	0	0	0	0

Coaching information
Club
Years	Team	Gms	W	D	L	W%
1988–89	Milton Keynes
1989–92	Queensland RL
1992–94	ARL, Gold Coast Seagulls
1995–97	Western Reds
1997–2000	Melbourne Storm
2001–02	Warrington Wolves
2007–08	Central Comets
2008–09	Tweed Heads Seagulls
	Total	0	0	0	0

Rugby union career
Coaching career
- Years: Team
- 2002-03: Glasgow Warriors
- 2003-05: SRU
- 2005-07: IRFU
- 2011-13: Central Queensland RU
- 2013-2015: Central Queensland RU
- 2016-2019: Western Force Academy

Steve Anderson (born 1963 in Springsure, Queensland, Australia) is a former Assistant Coach of Glasgow Rugby, now known as the Glasgow Warriors; a former rugby league coach of various clubs including assistant coach Australian Kangaroos; a former High Performance Manager of the Scottish and Irish Rugby Unions; and now head coach, High Performance, Rugby Australia

== Playing career ==
Anderson was a professional rugby league footballer. Starting his career in the Queensland Rugby League Central Division he initially played in the Central Highlands Rugby League. He started with the Emerald Tigers, first in their Junior teams from 1976 to 1979 then progressed to their Senior teams from 1980 to 1982.

Staying in the Queensland Central Division he then moved to the Fitzroy Sharks, staying there from January to August 1983. Anderson represented ROCKHAMPTON and Central Queensland City, 1983.

He played in the Gold Coast Rugby League turning out for Surfersparadise Sharks in 1984. Moving to the Brisbane league he played for the Past Brothers between 1984 and 1985. and Southern Suburbs in 1988 and 89 seasons. He returned to Beaudesert, Gold Coast 1986 and 1987 seasons. He represented Gold Coast Vikings, then a provincial side, between 1985 and 1987.

He moved 1988/89 to England where he played BARLA Milton Keynes. This was a move to get into coaching as he was player-coach for the team.

== Coaching and other roles ==
=== Rugby League ===
After coaching Southern Suburbs, Brisbane 3rd Grade and Milton Keynes, UK, Anderson moved back to Australia, becoming a development officer for Queensland Rugby League between 1989 and 1992. He then accepted assistant coach role Gold Coast Seagulls, an ARL side playing in the Winfield Cup. He was there from 1993-94. He then moved to the Western Reds as Development Manager (1995–97) and from there become the assistant coach at Melbourne Storm (1997–2000). During this period Anderson also was assistant coach with Australia Kangaroos and the World Cup team 2000.

==== Warrington Wolves ====
He then moved back to England, becoming head coach of Warrington Wolves (2001–2). He went back to rugby league in 2007, becoming the head coach of the Comets. In 2008-9 he went back to the Tweed Heads Seagulls this time as head coach.

=== Rugby Union ===
==== Glasgow Warriors ====
Anderson was to switch codes to coach rugby union. Scottish Rugby Union Glasgow Warriors. Kiwi Searancke as head coach of Glasgow; Anderson Assistant. The other assistant coach Gordon Macpherson, Searancke, NZ, with Anderson, an Australian, making an entire antipodean management team."

==== Scotland ====
Anderson was moved to Murrayfield as high performance manager. Telfer states that this was already in his plans before the management changeover at Glasgow; as Anderson had particular skills in that area. Anderson was to develop and manage the SRU's Elite Performance plans; those plans being the SRU's academy structure for young talented players.

==== Ireland ====
High Performance manager Irish Rugby Football Union.

==== Australia ====
Director of Rugby, Central Queensland Rugby Union. Head coach, High Performance RWA, Rugby Australia; Director of Rugby|RugbyWA

=== Outwith Rugby ===
Laboratory technician / manager Queensland manager, Australian Drug Foundation Queensland Manager integrated living

Sporting positions
Preceded by Darryl van der Velde; 1997-2001	Coach Warrington Wolves; 2001-2002	Succeeded by David Plange; 2002-2002
