= Joe Naufahu =

New Zealand actor and rugby player

- Born: 25 January 1978 (age 48) New Zealand
- Height: 1.80 m (5 ft 11 in)
- Weight: 88 kg (13 st 12 lb)
- School: King’s College
- Notable relative(s): Rene Naufahu, brother Jasmine Pereira, cousin

Rugby union career
- Position: Centre
Amateur team(s)
Years	Team	Apps	(Points)
	Stirling County	0	(0)
2004–2005	Glasgow Hutchesons Aloysians	10	(5)
Senior career
Years	Team	Apps	(Points)
2002	Leicester Tigers	5	(0)
2002–2004	Glasgow Warriors	8	(10)
Provincial / State sides
Years	Team	Apps	(Points)
- Canterbury
-	Southland		
Super Rugby
Years	Team	Apps	(Points)
- Crusaders
International career
Years	Team	Apps	(Points)
- New Zealand U19
- New Zealand U21
Coaching career
- Years: Team
- Glasgow Hutchesons Aloysians (Asst.)

Joe Naufahu (born 25 January 1978 in New Zealand) is a New Zealand actor and former professional rugby player. During his rugby career, he played for the Leicester Tigers and Glasgow Warriors, among others, and briefly coached the Glasgow Hutchesons Aloysians. He began acting in 2005. Most notably, he portrayed Khal Moro in the sixth season of the HBO fantasy TV series Game of Thrones. In August 2021, it was announced that he would feature in the 2021 Season of Celebrity Treasure Island 2021.

== Personal life ==
Naufahu has stated his grandparents were from Tonga, Samoa, Portugal and Germany, though he's also mentioned having Irish roots. His brother is actor and director Rene Naufahu.

== Career ==
=== Rugby ===
Naufahu played rugby for his school, King’s College and played with New Zealand Schoolboys on their tour of the United Kingdom in 1995. He then joined the provincial side Canterbury and played for the New Zealand Under 19s and Under 21s. He also played for Southland

He played in the Super 12 Under 23 tournament for the Canterbury Crusaders in 2001.

He moved to the United Kingdom in 2002 and had a brief spell with Leicester Tigers starting 2 matches and making 3 appearances from the bench. From there, he signed for the Glasgow Warriors in December 2002. He worked with the then Glasgow coach Kiwi Searancke coming through the age grades in New Zealand. He was immediately put in the first team. He marked his Glasgow debut by scoring a try against rivals Edinburgh on Boxing Day 2002 at Hughenden Stadium in a 10-10 draw. He also scored a try in the return fixture in Edinburgh and Glasgow ultimately won the match 45-33. In season 2003-04, Naufahu suffered from a knee injury. In his rehabilitation, he played for amateur side Stirling County.

The knee injury eventually caused Naufahu to quit professional rugby but he continued playing for amateur side Glasgow Hutchesons Aloysians in 2004-05. However, the injury eventually prevented him playing at an amateur level and he moved to become a coach at Glasgow Hutchesons Aloysians.

=== Acting ===
After some smaller roles, and one of the lead roles in the 2005 TV series The Market, Naufahu secured a recurring role in the sixth season of the fantasy TV series Game of Thrones in 2016 as Khal Moro.

He plays Reuben on the Acorn TV series My Life is Murder starting in season 2.

He played Mils Muliaina in the Rugby Union movie The Kick (2014), a biography of All Black Stephen Donald who kicked New Zealand's winning penalty in the 2011 Rugby World Cup.

=== Fitness ===
Nauhafu runs a personal training business called Ludus Magnus.

== Filmography ==
=== Film ===
Year	Title	Role	Notes
1997	The Whole of the Moon	Cop	
2010	Matariki	Young cop	
2014	The Last Saint	Pinball	
2017	Ghost in the Shell	Police Commander Johns	
2019	Enemy Within	Ben Kanahele	

=== Television ===
Year	Title	Role	Notes
2005	The Market	Sef Lima	Main role
2009	Power Rangers RPM	Guard	Episode: "Run Ziggy Run"
2012	Spartacus: Vengeance	Liscus	4 episodes
2009 – 2012	Go Girls	Eli Fa'asalele	22 episodes
2012 – 2013	Auckland Daze	Joe	2 episodes
2014	The Kick	Mils Muliaina	Television film
2016	Game of Thrones	Khal Moro	3 episodes
2020 – 2021	Head High	Jesse Roberts	Main role, 2 seasons
2021-2025	My Life Is Murder	Reuben	
