= Gregor Townsend =

British Lions & Scotland international rugby union player

- Full name: Gregor Peter John Townsend
- Born: 26 April 1973 (age 53) Galashiels, Scotland
- Height: 1.83 m (6 ft 0 in)
- School: Galashiels Academy
- University: University of Edinburgh; Aston University

Rugby union career
- Position(s): Fly-half, Centre, Fullback
- Current team: Scotland (head coach)
Senior career
Years	Team	Apps	(Points)
1990–1995	Gala		
1993–1995	Warringah		
1995–1998	Northampton	64	
1998–2000	Brive	48	
2000–2002	Castres	51	
2002–2004	Border Reivers	19	
2004	Sharks	9	
2004–2005	Montpellier	30	
2005–2007	Border Reivers	37	
- Correct as of 15 May 2023
International career
Years	Team	Apps	(Points)
1991–1992	Scotland 'B'	2	
1992–1996	Scotland 'A'	5	
1993–2003	Scotland	82	(164)
1997	British Lions	2	(0)
- Correct as of 15 May 2023
Coaching career
- Years: Team
- 2005–2007: Border Reivers
- 2008–2009: Scotland A (assistant)
- 2009–2012: Scotland (assistant)
- 2012–2017: Glasgow Warriors
- 2017–: Scotland
- 2021: British & Irish Lions (assistant)
- Correct as of 15 May 2023

Gregor Peter John Townsend MBE (born 26 April 1973) is a Scottish professional rugby union coach and former player who has been head coach of the Scotland national team since 2017. Townsend was previously an assistant coach from 2009 to 2012.

As a player, he won 82 caps for Scotland and two for the British Lions. He is a former coach of Glasgow Warriors and was a player-coach for Border Reivers. As well as in Scotland, he played club rugby in Australia, England, France and South Africa. As coach of Scotland, his team won at Twickenham for the first time in 38 years in 2021. Townsend was attack coach for the 2021 British & Irish Lions tour to South Africa.

Townsend was awarded an MBE in 1999 for services to rugby.

== Early life and education ==
Townsend was born in April 1973 in Galashiels and went to school at Galashiels Academy. He graduated in 1995 from the University of Edinburgh with an MA degree in History and Politics.

== Playing career ==
=== Club ===
Townsend started playing for his local club Gala RFC, where his father had played, and came through from the mini section to senior side.

In 1993, Townsend spent a season in Australia, playing for Warringah in the Shute Shield. He was part of the team that came runners-up to Gordon, losing 23–19. He returned to the club in 1995 after leaving his local side Gala.

In 1995, Townsend joined English side Northampton for the 1995–96 Courage League National Division Two, where he helped the side to promotion to the top English division for 1996. He remained with the club for a further two seasons in the top English division before moving to France to play for Brive in the French Rugby Union Championship. Across the two seasons he played for the club, Brive did not make much success which saw Townsend move to play for Castres Olympique in 2000. In Townsend's first season with Castres, the side topped Pool 1 which saw them advance through to the quarter-finals where they defeated Colomiers 37–26. However, Castres failed to make the final after losing to Toulouse 32–21 in the semi-final. Following a disappointing 2001–02 Top 16 season, Townsend returned to Scotland to play for Border Reivers.

In December 1996 he represented the Barbarians, playing against Australia at Twickenham.

After retiring from international rugby in 2003, in December of that year Townsend signed with South African Super 12 side the Sharks. He played a single season for the Sharks before he returned to France to play for Montpellier. Townsend made one appearance for the French Barbarians during his stint with Montpellier, against Australia in November 2004.

In 2005, Townsend returned home to Scotland for a second time and was a player/coach for the Border Reivers until they were disbanded at the end of the 2006–07 season.

=== Provincial ===
He played for South of Scotland District in the Scottish Inter-District Championship.

=== International ===
He was capped by Scotland 'B' to play Ireland 'B' on 28 December 1991 and played in the Scotland 'B' side against France 'B' in the spring of 1992.

He played for Scotland 'A' in the 'A' side's first match, against Spain. He received 5 'A' caps in total.

Townsend made his international debut at the age of 19, coming off the bench against England on 6 March 1993 during the 1993 Five Nations Championship. A year later Townsend gained his second cap, which was a starting position against Wales during the 1994 Five Nations Championship. He then started the next 35 tests for Scotland before he was next played off the bench. Townsend's pass to Gavin Hastings for Scotland to register a last-minute 23–21 victory against France in Paris in 1995, was nicknamed "the Toonie flip".

In 1997, he was selected for the British Lions tour to South Africa by Ian McGeechan. He played in six games, including starting against South Africa in the first and second tests.

During the 1999 Five Nations Championship, Townsend scored a try against every other country, becoming the first Scotsman since 1925 to achieve this feat. His efforts across all four games helped Scotland to claim the Championship for the first time since 1990. Later that year, he was selected for his first ever Rugby World Cup, where he played in every Scotland game. However, Scotland failed to progress past the quarter-finals after losing to New Zealand 30–18. In April 2002 he became Scotland's most capped player when he overtook the 65 full international appearances achieved by Scott Hastings. He was again selected for Scotland's World Cup squad in 2003, and again played in every game. However, Scotland again did not progress past the quarter-finals, as they lost to hosts Australia 33–16. This was his last match playing for Scotland.

=== Playing honours ===
Scotland

- Five / Six Nations Championship
  - Winners: 1999
  - Runners-up: 1993, 1995, 1996
  - Third: 2001
- Calcutta Cup
  - Winners: 2000
- Centenary Quaich
  - Winners: 1995, 1996, 1997, 1998, 1999, 2001

British and Irish Lions

- South African test series
  - Winners: 1997

Warringah

- Shute Shield
  - Runners-up: 1993

Northampton Saints

- National Division Two
  - Winners: 1996

CA Brive

- Heineken Cup
  - Runners-up: 1998
- Coupe de France
  - Runners-up: 2000

== Coaching career ==
=== Border Reivers ===
On Townsend's return to Scotland, in 2005 he took up a player/coach role with Border Reivers which was where he started his coaching career. After the club disbanded in 2007, he started a Scotland mentoring program in which a number of former internationals gave specialized coaching to rising Scottish players. This included working with the top Scottish clubs, Edinburgh and Glasgow Warriors, and the age-grade national sides, while he also worked with the amateur/semi-pro clubs.

=== Scotland ===
In October 2008, Townsend was appointed as assistant coach for the Scotland A national side ahead of their matches in later that year. In January 2009, he was appointed backs coach for the national side, before becoming the national attack coach the following season.

During Townsend's tenure, he helped Scotland to their first win over Australia since 1982 and their first win over South Africa since 2002. He was their attack coach during the 2011 Rugby World Cup where Scotland failed to advance past the pool stage.

=== Glasgow Warriors ===
In March 2012, Townsend stood down from his role with the national team and replaced Sean Lineen at Glasgow Warriors as their head coach.

In Townsend's first season in charge, he maintained Glasgow's positioning in the play-offs of the Pro12, but as in the previous season under Lineen, Glasgow were knocked out by Leinster in the semi-finals. As Glasgow continued to build under Townsend, they made their first final appearance after beating Munster in the semi-finals 16–15. They faced Leinster in the final, only to lose 34–12. In Europe, they continued to struggle, finishing bottom of their pool for the second consecutive season.

The 2014–15 season not only saw Glasgow narrowly miss out on the knock-out stage of the European Rugby Champions Cup, with a loss to Bath in their final pool game, but they also made their second consecutive final in the Pro12. In that final, they defeated Munster 31–13 to claim their first ever Pro 12 title. During that season, Glasgow won all of their home games in the Pro 12, extending their unbeaten run at Scotstoun to 21 games. This unbeaten run came to an end when they were beaten by the Scarlets in the opening round of the 2015–16 Pro12 season. During the 2015–16, Glasgow failed to retain their title after they were knocked out by Connacht, who were later crowned champions, in the semi-finals.

The 2016–17 season would be Townsend's last at Glasgow, with the announcement of him taking charge of the Scottish national side in June 2017, replacing Vern Cotter when his contract expired. In that season, Glasgow failed to make the Pro 12 play-off's for the first time since the 2010–11 Celtic League season. Up until that point, they were the only club to have made all the play-offs under the current Pro 12 format. However, Glasgow did make the knockout stage of the 2016–17 European Rugby Champions Cup, only to fall against Saracens in the quarter-finals 38–13. This was the first Glasgow side to make the top-tier competition play-off in Europe, since the 1997–98 Heineken Cup, though Glasgow did make the second-tier competition knockout stage during the 2006–07 European Challenge Cup.

Townsend left the club with a 62% win rate across all competitions, winning 91 games from the 147 games coached.

=== Scotland ===
Townsend took over the head coach role for the Scotland national rugby team when the Warriors season finished in May 2017. On 8 May, Townsend named his first squad for Scotland's 2017 June tests. His first game in charge of Scotland was a 34–13 victory against Italy in Singapore, which was backed up by a first ever win in Sydney against Australia 24–19. However, their final test on tour, an away game to Fiji, saw Scotland narrowly lose to the Flying Fijians 27–22, to see Scotland lose to the Pacific nation for the first time since 1998, the last time they played in Suva. Townsend led Scotland to a successful Autumn Internationals campaign, defeating Samoa 44–38 and Australia 53–24, which was a record winning margin for Scotland over Australia. Scotland also came within moments of defeating New Zealand, losing 17–22. Had it not been for a try saving tackle in the dying seconds of the game from Beauden Barrett, the score could have been equalized ahead of a potential match winning conversion.

Despite much promise in their Autumn campaign, Scotland started Townsend's first Six Nations Championship with a 34–7 defeat to Wales. Scotland returned to winning ways in round 2, defeating France 32–26. In round 3, Townsend led Scotland to their first victory over England since 2010, winning 25–13, their largest winning victory over England in a Six Nations game. That victory meant they extended their home victories in the Championship out to 6, something they hadn't achieved since their home wins between the 1989 and 1991 Five Nations Championships. Despite creating chances against Ireland, Scotland were unable to come away with the victory, losing 28–8. In the final round, it came down to a last minute penalty from Greig Laidlaw to secure a 29–27 win over Italy, to finish third on the table, their highest positioning since 2013. The 2018 June tests saw a young and inexperienced side travel to the Americas. The first game ended in a 48–10 victory over Canada, however the second test saw the United States claim a 30–29 win to see them earn their first victory over Scotland and a Tier 1 nation in the professional era. Despite this, Scotland went on to claim a record victory over Argentina, winning 44–15.

Townsend's second Six Nations campaign started well with a convincing win over Italy by 33–20, with a hat-trick from Blair Kinghorn alongside tries to Stuart Hogg and Chris Harris. Scotland dominated the game until a surprising fight-back by Italy in the last 10 minutes saw the Azzurri score three times to set up a tense finish. A close-fought but chaotic loss to Ireland by 13-22 came the following week, with further losses to France (10-27) and eventual Grand Slam winners Wales (11-18) in the ensuing rounds. In the last game of the competition, Scotland faced England at home in Twickenham. The first half was almost entirely one-sided, with England racing out to a 31–0 lead in the first 30 minutes, until Stuart McInally scored a breakaway try off a charge-down from English captain Owen Farrell. The second half witnessed a stunning comeback by the Scots, with a flurry of tries to Darcy Graham, Magnus Bradbury, Finn Russell and Sam Johnson putting Scotland into the lead by 38–31 with 4 minutes to go before a last-gasp try to replacement English fly-half George Ford, who then converted to level the final score at 38-38. The drawn result allowed Scotland to retain the Calcutta Cup, and was both the highest-scoring draw and the highest-scoring comeback of any rugby match on record.

==== Record by opponent ====
Opponent	Played	Won	Drew	Lost	Win ratio (%)	Points for	Points against
Argentina	8	5	0	3	63	259	190
Australia	5	4	0	1	80	134	85
Canada	2	2	0	0	100	121	22
Chile	1	1	0	0	100	52	11
England	9	6	2	1	67	205	167
Fiji	6	4	0	2	67	208	119
France	14	8	0	6	57	304	375
Georgia	4	4	0	0	100	161	32
Ireland	12	0	0	12	0	154	330
Italy	12	10	0	2	83	352	204
Japan	2	1	0	1	50	50	48
Maori All Blacks	1	1	0	0	100	29	26
New Zealand	3	0	0	3	0	57	78
Portugal	1	1	0	0	100	59	21
Romania	1	1	0	0	100	84	0
Russia	1	1	0	0	100	61	0
Samoa	3	3	0	0	100	119	50
South Africa	5	0	0	5	0	81	148
Tonga	3	3	0	0	100	161	31
United States	3	2	0	1	67	156	37
Uruguay	1	1	0	0	100	31	19
Wales	10	5	0	5	50	206	213
TOTAL	107	61	1	45	57	3044	2206
*Correct as of July 21, 2026

=== British & Irish Lions ===
Having turned down the opportunity to join Warren Gatland's the coaching staff for the 2017 British & Irish Lions tour to New Zealand due to having only just taken over the Head Coach role with Scotland, Townsend was named as attack coach for the 2021 tour to South Africa.

==== Honours ====
- Calcutta Cup
  - Winners: 2018, 2019*, 2021, 2022, 2023, 2024, 2026 (*retained through a draw)
- Auld Alliance Trophy
  - Winners: 2018, 2020, 2021, 2026
- Hopetoun Cup
  - Winners: June 2017, November 2017, 2021, 2024
- Douglas Horn Trophy
  - Winners: 2018, 2024
- Doddie Weir Cup
  - Winners: 2020, 2023, 2024, 2025, 2026
- Cuttitta Cup
  - Winners: 2022, 2023, 2025

=== Other honours ===
Scotland (as assistant coach)

- Centenary Quaich
  - Winners: 2010
- Hopetoun Cup
  - Winners: 2009

Glasgow Warriors

- Pro12
  - Winners: 2015
  - Runners-up: 2014
- 1872 Cup
  - Winners: 2013, 2014, 2017

== Recognition ==
Townsend received an MBE in 1999 for his services to rugby.

== Personal life ==
Townsend is married.

Townsend is an advocate for mental health, and has discussed times when he felt pressure and discomfort in his career.

Townsend is a lifelong supporter of Scottish football side Rangers F.C.

== Bibliography ==
- Bath, Richard (ed.) The Complete Book of Rugby (Seven Oaks Ltd, 1997 ISBN 1-86200-013-1)
- Townsend, Gregor Talk of the Toony: The Autobiography of Gregor Townsend (HarperSport, 2007 ISBN 978-0-00-725113-1)

Sporting positions
Preceded by (New Zealand) Vern Cotter	Scottish national rugby coach 2017–Present	Succeeded by Incumbent
