= Kiwi Searancke =

NZ rugby union player (born c.1952)

- Born: Kiwi Searancke New Zealand

Rugby union career
- Position: Prop
Amateur team(s)
Years	Team	Apps	(Points)
-	Te Awamutu OB		
–	Hamilton Marist		
–	Eastern Suburbs		
Provincial / State sides
Years	Team	Apps	(Points)
1976-83	Waikato	73	(4)
Coaching career
- Years: Team
- 1999–2001: Waikato
- 2002–03: Glasgow Warriors
- 2004–05: Poverty Bay

Kiwi Searancke (born c. 1952 in New Zealand) is a former rugby union player, and former head coach of Glasgow Rugby, now known as the Glasgow Warriors. He took over the club from Richie Dixon on 27 June 2002 when Dixon was appointed the SRU's Head of Coach Development.

== Rugby union career ==
=== Amateur career ===
Searancke played for Te Awamutu OB, Hamilton Marist and Eastern Suburbs.

=== Provincial career ===
Searancke was a prop for Waikato.

=== Coaching career ===
==== Waikato and New Zealand ====
He was a coach of Waikato Rugby and was also involved in developing New Zealand's young rugby talent as a national under-21 selector and a coach of the New Zealand Nike Youth Team.

==== Glasgow Warriors ====
The SRU's Director of Rugby Jim Telfer stated that he was keen for the Glasgow players to experience different styles of coaching in bringing in Searancke. He appointed Steve Anderson, previously the Australian National rugby league assistant coach, as Searancke's assistant. Also kept on as assistant was Gordon Macpherson.

Telfer and Dixon were embarrassed by the fitness of the Glasgow players returning from their holidays to start their pre-season training. A good few of the players were out of condition and two Scotland international forwards laboured on a 3 km run in Dalziel Country Park. The professional players had previously been given a fitness programme to follow in the close season in an effort to match Super12 physical standards.

Searancke was to bring in a toughness to managing the squad who he felt were under-performing. Not surprisingly though his uncompromising attitude ruffled many of the Glasgow players and soon there was a split in the dressing room between players and management.

Searancke's time in charge of the Glasgow side is named as ninth in the top 10 coaching disasters in the book Rugby Top 10 of Everything. It remarks: "He was critical of his players too often. Almost weekly Searancke would publicly remark about their poor basic skills and questionable attitudes". Yet Searancke often blamed himself rather than the players; lamenting on a poor decision by Gordon Bulloch which cost Glasgow the game against Ulster he said "It boiled down to the fact that we had not discussed the scoring permutations and the tie-break situation. It is something the coaches should have sorted out with the players earlier in the week. It didn't happen - so that was a mistake of mine."

His fiery nature wasn't helped weeks later when Glasgow were thumped in the Heineken Cup 45-3 by Sale. This led to a public shouting match in the team room at Glasgow's Manchester hotel between Searancke and Glasgow's marketing manager Graham Clarke when Clarke picked the wrong time to ask Searancke to sign a shirt. "If you don't leave here, I'll punch you in the face" was the response. Searancke was to receive an official warning by the club for his behaviour.

Telfer met Glasgow's senior players to assess the mood before reaching the decision with Glasgow that Searancke and Macpherson had to go. Anderson was moved to the SRU to help with Elite Development. At the time Telfer noted that Searancke's appointment at Glasgow was a mistake. However in his autobiography 'Looking back... for once' he states that he regretted the sacking as Searancke identified limitations in terms of the players' standards and their ability to push themselves to the levels required to be consistently competitive. This was backed by outgoing Glasgow player Jason White who stated that a lot of the problems were with the players.

==== Back to New Zealand ====
Searancke left Glasgow Warriors on 1 April 2003 and shortly afterwards got a job back in New Zealand coaching Poverty Bay rugby club. During that tenure as head coach he took Poverty Bay from the mid ranks of the division to win that division within a season

Searancke became a coach of the Black Ferns.
