= Andrew Wilson (rugby union) =

Scotland international rugby union player

- Born: Andrew Wilson Fife, Scotland
- Height: 1.93 m (6 ft 4 in)
- Weight: 108 kg (17 st 0 lb; 238 lb)
- School: Ellon Academy

Rugby union career
- Position: Flanker / Wing
Amateur team(s)
Years	Team	Apps	(Points)
1987–1998	Ellon RFC		
1998–2001	Aberdeen GSFP		
2008–2009	Aberdeen GSFP		
Senior career
Years	Team	Apps	(Points)
- Caledonia Reds
2002–2007	Glasgow Warriors	83	(30)
International career
Years	Team	Apps	(Points)
–	Scotland U19		(7)
–	Scotland U21		(9)
2003–2006	Scotland A	5	(7)
2005–2005	Scotland	1	(0)
National sevens team
Years	Team		Comps
	Scotland		12

2nd Sir Willie Purves Quaich
- In office 2001–2001
- Preceded by: Donnie Macfadyen
- Succeeded by: Ally Hogg

Andrew Wilson (born December 1980 in Fife, Scotland) is a Scottish rugby union footballer who played for Glasgow Warriors and Scotland. He could play at either flanker, or Number Eight.

== Rugby union career ==
=== Amateur career ===
At an amateur level he played for Ellon, Aberdeen GSFP and Heriot's FP.

=== Professional career ===
He joined Glasgow Warriors in 2002. He made his debut against Cardiff RFC on 31 August 2002, becoming Glasgow Warrior No. 102.

=== International career ===
By 2002 he had represented Scotland at several levels: U19, U21, students and Scotland 7s.

He won his one, and only, Scotland senior cap against Romania in 2005.

== Engineering career ==
Wilson works as an engineer in the oil industry in Scotland.
