= Border Reivers (rugby union) =

Defunct Scottish rugby union club, based in Galashiels

- Full name: Border Reivers
- Nickname: Borders
- Founded: 1996
- Disbanded: 2007; 19 years ago
- Location: Galashiels, Selkirkshire, Scotland
- Ground: Netherdale (Capacity: 6,000)
- League: Celtic League
1st kit	2nd kit

Border Reivers, originally known as Scottish Borders Rugby, were one of four professional rugby union teams in Scotland, alongside Edinburgh, Caledonia Reds and Glasgow Warriors.

Border Reivers were active in the Scottish Inter-District Championship from 1996 to 1998 and in the Celtic League, Celtic Cup and Heineken Cup from 2002 until 2007, when, as part of the Scottish Rugby Union's cost-cutting measures, they were disbanded. They played their home matches at Netherdale (capacity circa 6,000) in Galashiels in the Scottish Borders region.

== History ==
The Border Reivers were a continuation of the amateur South of Scotland rugby union team, reshaped as a professional side in 1996.

=== District sides ===
Scotland had four district sides: North and Midlands, South, Glasgow District, and Edinburgh District.

The district sides capped the best amateur players from their areas' club sides to play inter-district matches and matches against touring sides. Unlike the Scottish clubs (and Ireland's provincial sides), the Scottish district sides had no settled home and were not members of their Rugby Union. This meant when Scottish rugby embraced professionalism, it was not clear if a model based on districts or clubs would be used.

=== Professional model: club or district ===
It was not clear which route professionalism would go in Scotland. This created a turbulent start for professionalism in Scotland and left Scotland far behind fast-embracing Ireland in the set-up of its professional structure. The first season of the Heineken Cup in 1995–96 was run without any Scottish teams in European competition.

The SRU were concerned that the existing and long-established Scottish amateur club sides could not compete against the best teams from France and England and that by professionalising the district sides they would be more capable of advancing Scottish Rugby.

The four amateur district teams – Glasgow, Edinburgh, South of Scotland, and North and Midlands – were to become the professional sides Glasgow Warriors, Edinburgh Rugby, Border Reivers, and the Caledonia Reds, respectively.

=== Formation of Border Reivers ===
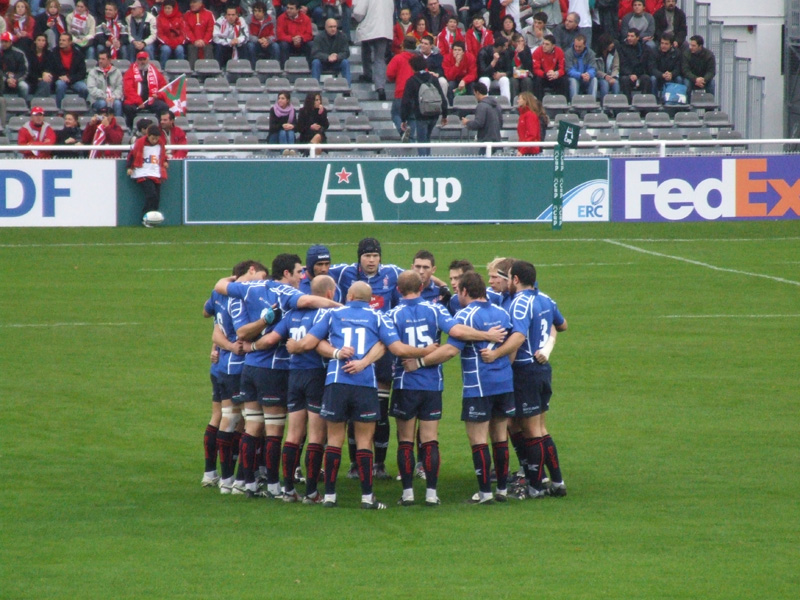
Border Reivers preparing for a Heineken Cup match against Biarritz in 2006

The Border Reivers were created in 1996 to compete in the Heineken Cup, because the Scottish Rugby Union did not think that Scottish club sides would be able to compete against the best teams from France and England.

Border Reivers and the other three Scottish districts competed in the Scottish Inter-District Championship to determine their European qualifying; the leagues positions determining whether they entered the Heineken Cup or the Challenge Cup.

=== Merger with Edinburgh Rugby ===
Then financial difficulties – the SRU's high debt, partly as a result of the redevelopment of Murrayfield – called for retrenchment. After two seasons, financial difficulties forced the Union to merge the four teams into two. The Border Reivers side merged with Edinburgh Rugby to form a team to be known as Edinburgh Reivers, causing outrage with many Border rugby fans, as effectively the Border side was disbanded.

=== Resurrection ===
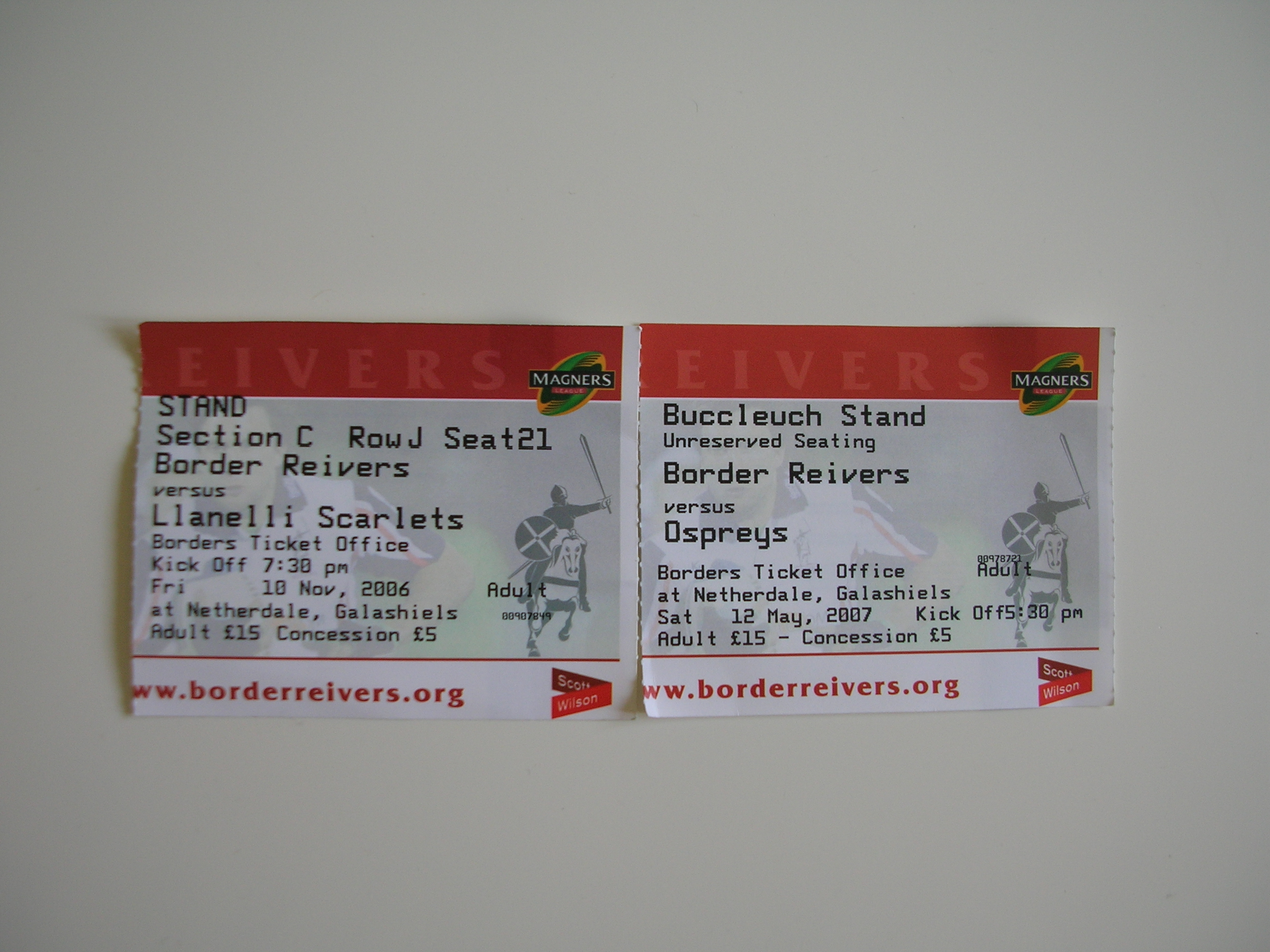
Reivers ticket stubs

The establishment and early success of a Celtic League caused the SRU to rethink its professional district structure. The Border Reivers side was resurrected in 2002 as The Borders and joined the second season of the Celtic League.

Since their return as a team in 2002, the Borders failed to challenge for the Celtic League title; however, they performed well during the 2005–06, finishing mid-table.

=== Disbandment again ===
On 27 March 2007, Scottish Rugby Union announced the Reivers were to disband at the end of the season as a cost-cutting exercise. Many fans and sections of the Scottish media have claimed that the Reivers suffered due to SRU's determination, despite poor crowds and results, to make rugby a success in Glasgow. At the end of the 2006–07 season, several Borders players transferred to Glasgow Warriors. The success Glasgow later achieved with sell out crowds and a Pro 12 title win suggests this was a wise strategy.

=== Potential revival ===
Following the decision by the SRU to disband the Borders Reivers, the Border Reivers Action Group was formed to fight against the disbandment.

However, in April 2007, the Borders Rugby Action Group conceded defeat as the SRU insisted there would be no finance available from the governing body. The action group pledged an attempt to resurrect the team in 2008; however, no such attempt was made.

On 19 December 2011, former Scottish internationalist Keith Robertson gave an interview to The Herald newspaper. Robertson claimed that he was in contact with "people in the Borders who are interested in getting involved in funding a professional team". However the interested parties were said to be unwilling to afford any direct shareholding to the SRU. Robertson went on to claim that if the project came to fruition, the team would feature many "Borderers" – an attribute he felt the defunct Border Reivers had lacked.

== Records and achievements ==
=== Season standings ===
Competing as Border Reivers unless otherwise stated.
ᵜ Competing as Scottish Borders.
^{β} Competing as The Borders.

==== League competitions ====
Scottish Inter-District Championship	Celtic League

Season	Pos	Pld	W	D	L	F	A	+/-	BP	Pts	Notes
1996–97 ᵜ	3rd	3	1	1	1	59	61	-2	-	3	
1997–98	4th	3	0	0	3	34	68	-34	-	0	
1998-2002	-	-	-	-	-	-	-	-	-	-	No Pro Borders Team
2002–03 ^{β}	2nd	8	4	0	4	164	224	-60	2	18	
2002–03 ^{β}	6th in Pool B	7	2	0	5	142	169	-27	4	12	
2003–04 ^{β}	12th	22	4	0	18	363	750	-387	6	22	
2004–05 ^{β}	11th	20	3	0	17	337	556	-219	6	18	
2005–06	9th	22	7	0	13	386	501	-115	8	44	(All deemed + 2 games: 8 pts)
2006–07	11th	20	2	0	18	201	545	-344	4	12	

==== European competitions ====
European Challenge Cup	Heineken Cup / European Champions Cup

Season	Pos	Pld	W	D	L	F	A	+/-	BP	Pts	Notes
1996–97 ᵜ	5th in Pool 2	4	1	0	3	80	178	-98	-	2	
1997–98	4th in Pool 3	6	0	0	6	129	222	-93	-	0	
1998-2002	-	-	-	-	-	-	-	-	-	-	No Pro Borders Team
2002–03 ^{β}	2nd round	4	2	0	2	172	68	+104	-	-	(lost to Montauban on aggregate)
2003–04 ^{β}	4th in Pool 4	6	1	0	5	39	183	-144	0	4	
2004–05 ^{β}	2nd round	4	2	0	2	242	84	+148	-	-	(lost to Clermont on aggregate)
2005–06	3rd in Pool 4	6	3	0	3	155	177	-22	3	15	
2006–07	3rd in Pool 6	6	1	0	5	121	166	-45	2	6	

== Notable former players ==
=== Scotland ===
The following former Border Reivers players have represented Scotland at full international level.

- (Scotland) Ross Ford (Hooker)
- (Scotland) Bruce Douglas (Prop)
- (Scotland) Gavin Kerr (Prop)
- (Scotland) Scott MacLeod (Lock)
- (Scotland) Nick De Luca (Centre)
- (Scotland) Ryan Grant
- (Scotland) Craig Moir
- (Scotland) Kelly Brown (Flanker)
- (Scotland) Gary Armstrong (Scrum Half)
- (Scotland) Chris Cusiter (Scrum Half)
- (Scotland) Gregor Townsend (Fly Half)
- (Scotland) Geoff Cross
- (Scotland) Ed Kalman
- (Scotland) Richie Vernon
- (Scotland) Ben MacDougall (Centre)
- (Scotland) Simon Danielli (Wing)
- (Scotland) Nikki Walker (Wing)
- (Scotland) Doddie Weir (Lock)
- (Scotland) Grant McKelvey
- (Scotland) Stuart Moffat

=== Notable non-Scottish players ===
The following is a list of notable non-Scottish international representative former Border Reivers players:

Samoa

- (Samoa) Opeta Palepoi (Lock)
- (Samoa) Semo Sititi (No.8)
- (Samoa) Tanner Vili (Fly Half/Full Back)

== Notable coaches ==
- Steve Bates
- Tony Gilbert

== See also ==
- Scottish Rugby Union
- Celtic League
- Heineken Cup
- European Challenge Cup
- Border Reivers
- South of Scotland rugby union team
